= Zane Beck =

- Birth name: Zane Beverly Beck
- Born: December 24, 1927; Clarksville, Arkansas, U.S.
- Died: May 26, 1985 (aged 57); Little Rock, Arkansas
- Genres: Country
- Occupation(s): Musician, steel guitar manufacturer
- Instrument: Pedal Steel Guitar
- Years active: 1947–1975

Zane Beverly Beck (1927–1985) was an American steel guitarist and builder of pedal steel guitars. He is best known for his 1952 innovation of adding knee levers to the pedal steel guitar to alter the pitch of certain strings, a feature which has become a standard on all modern-day instruments. Other inventors had patented crude knee-operated devices as far back as 1933, but none were successful. Beck revolutionized the concept into a durable and reliable mechanism and was the first to put knee levers on production guitars. He became a member of the International Steel Guitar Hall of Fame (1991). As a musician, he performed on the Grand Ole Opry and Shreveport's Louisiana Hayride. Beck formed the ZB Music Company which manufactures steel guitars, later called BMI (Beck Musical Instruments).

== Early history ==
Beck was born in northwest Arkansas, near Clarksville, in 1927. He became proficient in playing the steel guitar and became a staff musician on the Louisiana Hayride, a country music show broadcast from Shreveport. He was a frequent musical guest on Nashville's Grand Ole Opry. He became interested in the mechanics of steel guitars by (to use his words) "just fooling with them" and used his knowledge as a guitarist to address the instrument's limitations. In the late 1940s, he began repairing and modifying steel guitars for friends. About 1950, he was hired by Buddy Emmons and Shot Jackson to work in manufacturing of steel guitars for their company called Sho-Bud. Beck left Sho–Bud to form his own company, ZB Music Company.

== Innovation ==
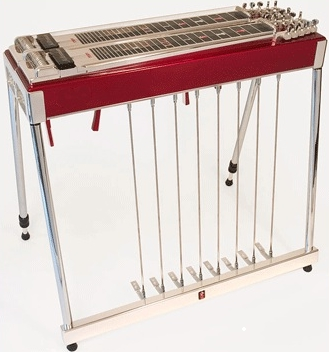
Pedal steel guitar. The pedals are at floor level; the knee levers are seen pointing downward just under the body of the instrument.

Pedals were first added to a lap steel guitar as far back as 1941 to make more notes and chords available to the player; thereafter, the pedal instrument became known as pedal steel to differentiate it from lap steel. The pedal instrument is a console steel played while seated. The foot pedals independently raise the pitch of certain strings on the instrument by a mechanical linkage to increase string tension. Beck extended the pedal concept by recruiting the player's knees to control a separate mechanism to lower the pitch of certain strings in addition those controlled by pedals. The levers are located unobtrusively underneath the body of the guitar, protruding downward on each side of each of the player's knees (see photo). The invention essentially doubled the performer's available options for chords by using his knees to participate in controlling the instrument in addition to both hands and both feet. The knee levers work independently of the foot pedals. Each knee can move medially or laterally to move the four levers; (Note: Later models added additional levers actuated by raising the knee upward under the guitar as well as side-to-side.) the player learns to lean his knee against a lever and, if needed, push a pedal with his foot at the same time.

Tom Bradshaw, author and music industry veteran, said some form of knee levers may have existed in the 1930s, remembering a Hawaiian guitar with "crude" knee levers stamped "patent pending". The device was the "Harmolin" invented by Arthur R. Harmon and patented in 1933 but it was not successful and the patent expired in 1950. Beck's Steel Guitar Hall of Fame plaque reads, "He pioneered the use of knee levers, and was the first to install them on production guitars". For the story of how he came upon the idea, Beck said there was a musical job he wanted but the bandleader, Paul Howard, wanted a lap steel player and did not want a pedal steel guitar in his band. Beck wanted the job, so he designed a hidden pedal he could operate with his knee without being noticed.

== Commercial production ==
In the 1940s and 1950s several companies contributed to the practical evolution of the steel guitar, including Epiphone, the Harlin Brothers, Fender, Paul Bigsby, Sho-Bud as well as Zane Beck. Beck's first commercial installation of knee levers was in 1952 on the guitar of Kansas City guitarist Ray Noren. One year later, he added four levers to guitarist Jimmy Day's non-pedal guitar. Day was a well-known steel guitarist who had backed Hank Williams and Elvis Presley and had played on Ray Price's classic hit, "Crazy Arms". Each lever lowered one of four individual strings on Day's guitar by a semitone. Day's endorsement was a valuable asset for Beck's reputation. In the 1960s Beck sold the manufacturing rights to his first pedal steel model, the ZK, to Tom Brumley who took over the ZB Music company.

Jerry Garcia of the Grateful Dead played one of Beck's guitars. It was a custom-model D10 with ten strings on each neck, C6 and E9 tunings, eight pedals and two knee levers. The pedals raised the pitch of certain strings on that instrument while the knee levers lowered the pitch. Beck was inducted into the International Steel Guitar Hall of Fame in 1991.
