= Lloyd Green =

American pedal steel guitarist

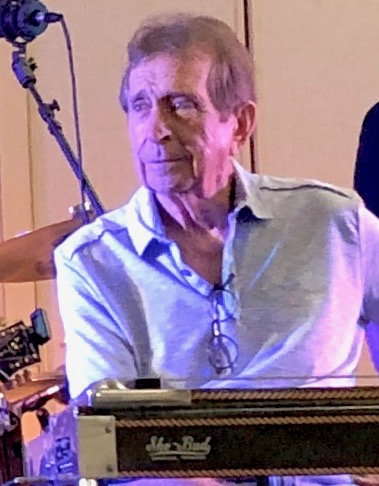
- Lloyd Green in 2021

Background information
- Born: Lloyd Lamar Green; October 4, 1937 (age 89); Leaf, Mississippi, U.S.
- Genre: Country
- Occupation: Musician
- Instrument: Pedal steel guitar
- Years active: 1947–present

Lloyd Lamar Green (born October 4, 1937) is an American pedal steel guitarist and session musician. Green was a member of the country music studio musician collective known as the Nashville A-Team, and has performed on more than 5,000 recordings, for artists such as Charley Pride, The Byrds, Country Johnny Mathis, Johnny Cash, The Monkees, Don Williams, Paul McCartney, and Bob Dylan. His playing on The Byrds' 1968 album Sweetheart of the Rodeo influenced generations of steel guitarists. Green was inducted into the Steel Guitar Hall of Fame in 1988.

== Early life ==
Lloyd Green at age 10, in a photo used in promotional materials by the Oahu Music Company

Green was born on October 4, 1937 in Leaf, Mississippi, about 40 miles southeast of Hattiesburg. He and his family moved to Mobile, Alabama at the age of four, where he began to take music lessons. At age seven, he applied for lessons at the Oahu Music Company, but they did not take students under fourteen. Oahu allowed a "test lesson" for him. When they found his strong aptitude, they let him enroll. He was an exceptional student, to the extent that Oahu used him in their promotional materials and newsletters. Green said, "I became the poster child for the course when I was about 10 years old" (see photo). About that time he received his first electric steel guitar, a Rickenbacker with an Oahu amplifier. He had the ability to memorize songs quickly and was able to play them back exactly as his teacher had played them. About this time, lap steel guitars were getting pedals added to become the new pedal steel guitar and Green made an improvised pedal to add to his lap steel using an automobile accelerator pedal. He graduated from high school in 1955 and attended the University of Southern Mississippi. Green said, "While in school, I was playing around Mississippi with Justin Tubb, the Wilburn Brothers, the Browns, Hank Locklin. . . It really whetted my appetite.” In 1956 at age 19, he shocked his parents when he decided to take a year off college and move to Nashville to pursue music. After the move, he roomed for a while with another future steel guitar great, Jimmy Day. A few months after the move, he met his future wife Dot Edwards from Columbia, Tennessee and they were married in 1957. They have remained together over five decades.

== Early career ==
Green joined Faron Young's road band in December 1956 and stayed for 18 months. He soon played steel guitar on his first session, George Jones' "Too Much Water" recorded in the newly opened RCA Studio in Nashville. After a one-month tour with Ferlin Husky, with money tight, he swore never to tour again and temporarily gave up music to work as a shoe salesman, not playing his guitar for two years. By the spring of 1963 he was ready to try music again. Singer Roy Drusky offered him a job as Drusky's assistant working in the Nashville office of the music licensing company SESAC. At that time, Green didn't have enough money to renew his expired musicians' union card until Fred Rose's widow renewed it for him. The SESAC job put Green in the middle of the action on Nashville's Music Row. He said, "...the first week I was there, Slim Williamson, who owned Chart Records, hired me for a demo and master session." Green began working with a new artist, Lynn Anderson, whose hits for Chart led to her stardom on Columbia Records with hits such as "Rose Garden".

== Success ==
In 1965, Green recorded a demo of a song called "The Bridge Washed Out" for Decca recording artist Warner Mack. Mack liked what Green played on the demo. It was a sharp-edged rapid style on muted strings now known as "chicken pickin'". Mack wanted to hire Green for the master session, but producer Owen Bradley objected. Green was an unknown outsider at the time and Bradley wanted Pete Drake, who was a veteran studio player. Warner persisted and Green got the job. At the session, Bradley was not happy and said over the talkback, "Turn them damn highs off-a that steel! They're killin'my ears". Bassist Bob Moore heard Green play and said, "Son, that's a career for you right there – there's your sound!" Moore's positive sentiment was not unanimous– Bradley was not convinced and guitarist Grady Martin issued a one-word expletive. However, when the record came out three months later, it went straight to number one and ushered Green into the circle of studio hit-makers. Well-wishers congratulated Bradley on the hit's ground-breaking new sound and his answer was "Well, I really appreciate that. We knew we were on to something new when we cut it." The unique style was copied by other steel players and remained in vogue for a few years thereafter.

For the next 15 years, Green remained an elite studio player averaging 400 sessions a year including a string of 17 years of performing on at least three No. 1 songs each year. He performed on recordings of about 500 artists. A partial list includes Faron Young, Freddie Hart, the Byrds, Charley Pride, Paul McCartney, Ringo Starr, Dolly Parton, Ricky Skaggs, T.G. Sheppard, Ronnie Milsap, Waylon Jennings, Hank Snow, Jerry Lee Lewis, Nanci Griffith, Jim Reeves, Johnny Cash, Johnny Paycheck, and Loretta Lynn. He turned down a U.S. tour with McCartney due to the fact that he didn't want to lose work in Nashville.

His 1968 performance on the Byrds' landmark album Sweetheart of the Rodeo, made the biggest impact on the overall American music audience and influenced generations of non-mainstream country guitarists. Music writer Peter Cooper called the album "a genre-bender that illuminated a path that led to modern California Country, Americana and alternative country music". On the album, Green was featured on "You Ain't Goin' Nowhere", "Hickory Wind", "Nothing Was Delivered", and "One Hundred Years from Now". In Los Angeles, steel guitarist JayDee Maness performed on four other tracks. Green appeared with the Byrds at the Grand Ole Opry on March 16, 1968 to promote the album, but the Byrds were booed and heckled by the conservative Opry audience who considered them "long-haired outsiders". Part of the reason was that Gram Parsons assured the presenter that he would perform "Sing Me Back Home" by Merle Haggard, but instead performed his own song, "Hickory Wind". In 2018, Green and fellow steel guitarist JayDee Maness teamed up to make a tribute album called Journey to the Beginningː A Steel Guitar Tribute to the Byrds.

Many steel guitarists point to Green's 1968 performance on Charley Pride's In Person album as the highlight of Green's career to that point. In addition to his work as a sideman, Green has cut several of his own LPs, and had a top 40 hit with his instrumental version of “I Can See Clearly Now.”

== Later years ==
In the 1980s, an inner ear ailment which distorted his hearing forced Green to stop working. Green said, "It was a nightmarish experience. It went on for about a year before I quit doing sessions. Everything sounded terrible [to me]." He described it as a half-step different pitch in each ear. After a few years the problem resolved and he tried to return to session work after a 15-year hiatus but younger players and different styles had evolved and producers and record labels would not hire him. Green was inducted into the Steel Guitar Hall of Fame in 1988. He has performed with over 500 artists, has played on 116 number one hits, and over 100 top ten hits. He was featured with a speaking part on Ken Burns' Country Music documentary film in 2019. In October of 2026, Green headlined a showcase for Sho-Bud at the historic Ryman Auditorium in Nashville, accompanying Slash in a steel guitar rendition of "Sweet Child O Mine."

== Instruments ==
Green 's first steel guitar at age seven was an Oahu-brand acoustic model, likely made by Kay or Harmony, but modified with an adapter to raise the strings so it could be played "Hawaiian style" across the knees using a steel bar. He moved up to a 1943/1944 Rickenbacker Bakelite electric at age ten (1947) with an Oahu amplifier (see photo). After hearing Bud Isaacs' playing on the hit song 'Slowly' in 1952, many lap steel players began to switch to pedal steel. About that time, Green was playing a Fender Stringmaster lap steel, which had been retrofitted with pedals. In 1956, he was hired by Faron Young for an 18-month tour. Young said Green's steel was an "embarrassment" because it looked so shoddy, then loaned Green a triple-neck Bigsby model with one pedal.

Green left Faron Young in mid 1958, and received a new guitar courtesy of Shot Jackson, who traded Green's old Fender for a Rickenbacker doubleneck with two retrofitted pedals. Green used this "Rick" for the next three years. In 1963, he played a double-neck Bigsby on which Jackson added six pedals. By 1964 he played Sho-Bud steels and in 1966 changed to a Sho-Bud "fingertip" double 10 model which he played on many country hits.

In 1973, Green designed a guitar for Sho-Bud. It was a single E9 neck on a double neck cabinet. The empty space (usually filled by a C6 neck) was a padded blank. Prior to this, a single neck on a double neck cabinet setup did not exist. Called the LDG, the guitar was named for Green, but the middle initial was incorrect. This was done purposely and with Green's knowledge by Sho-Bud's David Jackson but the exact reason is unclear. It was the fourth and last Sho-Bud guitar that Lloyd played on sessions. Green used three different Sho-Bud volume pedals, rotating them at intervals to keep the potentiometers working efficiently. He owned a 1943 Dobro square neck (serial number A–147) given to him by Hank Williams Jr. during a recording session in 1969. Green used it on many sessions, most notably on Don Williams' records.

== Discography as a solo artist ==
=== Albums ===
Year	Album	US Country	Label
1964	Hawaiian Enchantment (his name is not featured on the cover)	—	Modern Sound
1964	Big Steel Guitar (aka The Big Steel Guitar)	—	Time
1966	Day for Decision	—	Little Darlin
1967	The Hit Sounds	—	Little Darlin
1968	Mr. Nashville Sound	37	Chart
1968	Cool Steel Man	—	Chart
1969	Green Country	—	Little Darlin
1970	Moody River	—	Chart
1970	Music City Sound (with Pete Wade)	—	MGM
1971	Lloyd Green and His Steel Guitar	—	Prize
1973	Shades of Steel	21	Monument
1975	Steel Rides	47	Monument
1975	Ten Shades of Green	—	Midland
1977	Stainless Steel (aka Feelings)	—	GRT
1980	Lloyd's of Nashville	—	Midland
1992	Reflections	—	Spark
2003	Revisited	—	LG
2018	Journey to the Beginning: A Steel Guitar Tribute to The Byrds ‘Sweetheart of the Rodeo' (with Jay Dee Maness)	—	Coastal Bend

=== Also appears on ===
- 1984: The Celestial Sounds of Steel Guitars (VGK) with JB Van - produced by Robin Vosbury and Lloyd Green
- 2010. The Lloyd Green Album (Red Beet) with Peter Cooper
- 2010: Master Sessions (Red Beet) with Eric Brace and Peter Cooper

=== Singles ===
Year	Single	Chart Positions		Album
Year	Single	US Country	CAN Country	Album
1967	"Pedal Pattle (aka Pedal Paddle)	—	—	"The Hit Sounds"
1968	"Mr. Nashville Sound"	—	—	Mr. Nashville Sound
1969	"Bar Hoppin'"	—	—	Cool Steel Man
1969	"Robin"	—	—	Moody River
1969	"Tell Ya What"	—	—	Moody River
1970	"Ride Ride Ride"	—	—	Mr. Nashville Sound
1970	"My Happiness" (with Pete Wade)	—	—	Music City Sound
1970	"Release Me" (with Pete Wade)	—	—	Music City Sound
1971	"Midnight Silence"	—	—	Lloyd Green and His Steel Guitar
1971	"Sound Waves"	—	—	Lloyd Green and His Steel Guitar
1972	"Morning Has Broken"	—	—	Shades of Steel
1973	"I Can See Clearly Now"	36	98	Shades of Steel
1973	"Here Comes the Sun"	73	—	Shades of Steel
1973	"Dixie Drive-In"	—	—	Shades of Steel
1974	"Atlantis"	—	—	Shades of Steel
1974	"Seaside"	—	—	Steel Rides
1974	"Canadian Sunset"	—	—	Steel Rides
1975	"Sally G"	—	—	Steel Rides
1975	"I Can Help"	—	—	Steel Rides
1976	"Darisa"	—	—	Ten Shades of Green
1976	"You and Me"	92	—	Feelings
1977	"Feelings"	—	—	Feelings
1977	"Whistler"	—	—	single only
1979	"Ricochet"	—	—	Lloyd's of Nashville
