= Doug Jernigan =

American musician (born 1946)

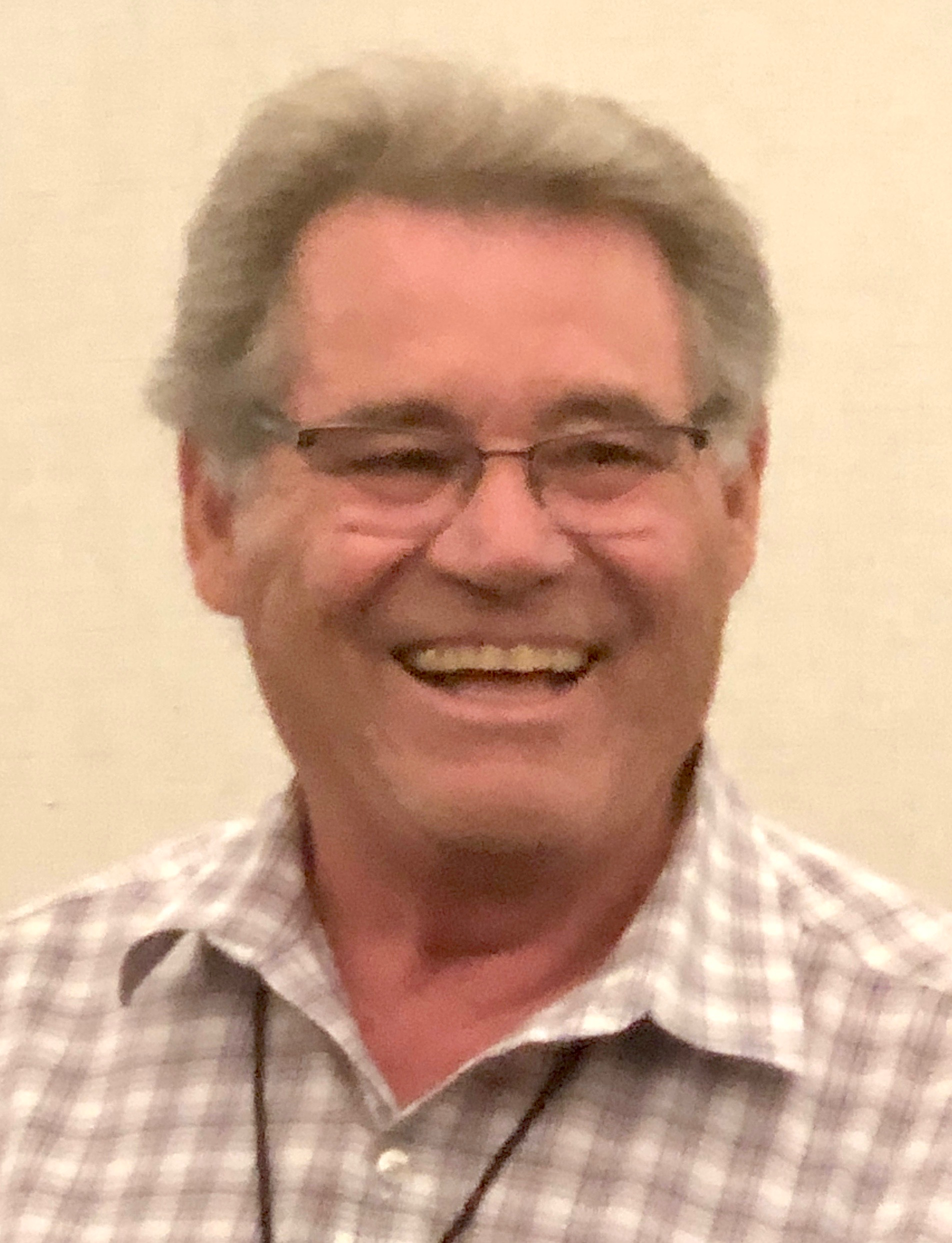
- Jernigan in 2021

Background information
- Born: 5 January 1946 (age 80); Pensacola, Florida U.S.
- Genres: Country, Jazz,
- Occupation: Steel guitarist
- Instruments: pedal steel guitar, lap steel guitar
- Years active: 1962–present

Doug Jernigan (born January 5, 1946) is an American pedal steel guitarist and Dobro player. He is known for his infusion of country music with jazz using fast single-note solos. He was one of the first steel guitarists to play solos at speeds rivaling the banjo and fiddle. Jernigan performed with Faron Young, Johnny Paycheck, Vassar Clements, Little Jimmy Dickens, and Lorrie Morgan and was a Nashville recording session musician and teacher for decades. As of 2020, he has been the featured artist on nine instrumental albums in both jazz and country genres. He was inducted into the Steel Guitar Hall of Fame in 1994.

== Early life ==
Jernigan was born in 1946 in Pensacola, Florida, to a family that was supportive of his musical talent, but were not musicians themselves. When he was nine years old his father bought him a lap steel guitar. He took lessons using the Oahu method using tablature for about six months. He said the lessons were simplified because his teacher really didn't know much about steel guitar, but he was a good musician who gave Jernigan a foundation in music theory. Together, they went through Nick Manoloff books for Spanish guitar and steel guitar. When his teacher moved away, Jernigan's formal lessons ended. His father helped him learn "licks" from records by ear by lifting and replacing the phonograph needle for him until he could duplicate the recorded passage. He received his first pedal steel guitar at age 12, a Fender 1000 double-neck. Not long afterward, he attended a convention in Nashville where he met Buddy Emmons, who was nine years his senior. Emmons invited him to bring his guitar to Emmons' house to get it customized to the "Nashville setup". Emmons added another pedal (making nine), and tuned the necks to E9 and C6. Jernigan said, "I played that guitar until it just about fell apart". By age fourteen, Jernigan was playing on the weekends at VFW and Legion Halls in the Pensacola area. He said his most powerful influences were Emmons, Bud Isaacs and Jimmy Day.

== Playing career ==
At age 16, Jernigan had been playing only basic county music with three chords. He and a hometown friend, Clyde Kendricks, became interested in other genres including jazz; he began playing standards such as "Tenderly" and "Moonlight in Vermont", learning some improvisation, which would serve him well later in his career. He moved to Nashville after high school and played at various clubs. At 18, he moved to Georgia to play in clubs, then to Ohio to join guitarist Gary Adams with whom he recorded an album. He was drafted in 1965 into the United States Army and sent to Vietnam. One month after returning from Vietnam, he moved to Nashville to do recording session work and perform in clubs as a pedal steel sideman. He played in a Nashville club called the "Demon's Den" where he developed the technique of playing at lightning fast speeds on single note solos that rivaled the speed of fiddles and banjos.

In 1970 Ron Lashley of the Emmons Guitar Company produced Jernigan's first album, Uptown To Country. Since then, he has been the featured artist on nine instrumental albums. His interest in jazz led to record label (Flying Fish) pairing him with jazz guitarist Bucky Pizzarelli for a jazz album. Jernigan said, "I explained to him [Pizzarelli] that I was basically a country player. What we were trying to do was to show what the steel guitar can be, by teaming up me, a pedal steel guitarist, with a jazz player of the caliber of someone like him". Jernigan prefers the C6 tuning which is better for jazz, but says "I have to play the E9 in Nashville — you know, for making money". In 1977, Jernigan became a Christian and began to play in church and still does today. He has recorded with Betty Jean Robinson, Joe Paul Nichols and many other gospel music groups. He is a frequent performer on the Grand Ole Opry.

Jernigan was inducted into the International Steel Guitar Hall of Fame in 1994. The hall of fame plaque reads:

Concert, session and major recording artist, he has shared his knowledge and advanced the steel and dobro into country jazz. He achieved single-string delivery beyond mere riffs, but for complete tunes, with flowing, scorching speed.

== Discography ==
- Sounds of Doug Jernigan and Gary Adams
- Roadside Rag (1976)
- Cross Country (1977)
- Doug and Bucky (1978)
- Skyhigh Steel (1978)
- Diggin' Doug (1993)
- Jazz by Jernigan (2000)
- Doug Jernigan Plays Jazz Standards (2006)
