= Universal tuning =

Tuning for twelve- or fourteen-string instruments

In playing pedal steel guitar, a universal tuning is a tuning for twelve or fourteen string instruments that combines features of several other tunings—commonly including one or both of the standard C6 and E9 tunings. Universal tunings are particularly favoured by advanced players of single-neck instruments.

== Motivation ==
Many players prefer not to play a pedal steel guitar with multiple necks, which add to the weight of the instrument and complexity of learning multiple tunings. The E9 Nashville tuning is the most popular tuning by far, with most implementations on a 10-string neck. The next most popular tuning is C6, which many players enjoy playing but appears on few recordings compared to E9. There is great appeal for a single neck pedal steel guitar with a tuning that can duplicate 90+% of the music played on the most popular tunings. While most touring professional pedal steel guitarists tend to either carry a double neck guitar (D-10 with E9 and C6 tunings) on the road, many have found that a single neck 10 string pedal steel guitar with the E9 tuning is enough for their needs. Some pro players have chosen a 12- or 14-string pedal steel for touring and recording sessions. Notable examples of players of universal tunings include Maurice Anderson (mentioned below), Julian Tharpe, Winnie Winston (mentioned below), Jeff Newman (also mentioned below), Joe Wright, 'Cowboy' Eddie Long, and others.

== Examples ==
The Bb6/Eb9 Universal Tuning was developed by Maurice ('Reece') Anderson in Dallas, TX. Reece was one of the last steel guitarists with the landmark western swing band Bob Wills and the Texas Playboys. Their music was very jazz-oriented and the tuning was developed to exploit the jazz changes but to also let the player use the characteristic sounds of the E9 Nashville tuning, which became popular in the 1960s in (what is now referred to as) CLASSIC country music. Maurice's Bb6 tuning is used by a relatively small number of players but is a powerful tuning for a player whose principal genre is western swing or jazz and for whom it is advantageous to be able to play the 'country licks' when the need arises.

In the first instance of the E9/B6 Universal Tuning was published. It was used by both authors and included 14 strings.

In 1974-5, Michigan steel guitarist Larry Bell adopted Maurice Anderson's tuning and quickly made changes toward incorporating more of the Nashville E9 sound by including pedal and knee lever changes (e.g., the 'C' pedal from E9, which Anderson had not incorporated into Bb6) and raising the entire tuning 1/2 step to B6/E9. Once the Winston/Keith book was published, Bell was influenced to continue modifying his tuning by changing the 4th and 8th strings from D# to E, developing a 12 string E9/B6 tuning that had elements of Maurice Anderson's tuning and elements of what Jeff Newman eventually published in his series of teaching materials. See http://www.larrybell.org for a more in-depth treatment of the tuning as used by Larry Bell.

The 12-string version of the E9/B6 Universal Tuning was popularized in the late 1970s by Nashville steel guitarist Jeff Newman who created the most popular instructional materials for pedal steel guitar. It remains the most widely used universal tuning. This tuning is based on the E9 Nashville tuning and is optimized to deliver the characteristic sounds of that tuning. The addition of four additional pedals and 2 or 4 extra strings in the lower register provides the ability to play music originally played on the C6 tuning, which is the second most common tuning (to the Nashville E9) on pedal steel guitars worldwide.
