= Copedent =

Table used to describe the tuning and pedal arrangement on a pedal steel guitar

Copedent (often copedant) is a term used to describe the tuning and pedal arrangement on a pedal steel guitar and is unique to that instrument. Typically expressed in the form of a table or chart, the word is a portmanteau of "chord–pedal–arrangement and is pronounced "co-PEE-dent". It was coined in 1969 by Steel Guitar Hall of Fame member Tom Bradshaw and first reached a wide audience in a 1972 article in Guitar Player magazine. A complete copedent includes the order of strings, their tuning, string gauges, and whether a string is plain or wound; it also indicates how any string's pitch is changed by applying a foot pedal or a knee lever. It has become an international standard used by steel guitar players and manufacturers to describe the specifications of these instruments.

== E9 copedent ==
The Nashville E9 tuning for a steel guitar (also called the "E9 Chromatic Tuning") is the most common tuning used in modern country music. The tuning evolved from 1950 to 1970 by incremental refinements by many elite steel guitarists playing on tour. During this period, a consensus developed toward standardization of the 10-string pedal steel guitar to support optimal chord and scale patterns across a single fret. It was very informal. If a player added an additional string, tuned differently, or changed the order of the strings, it either caught on with others or it did not. The copedent chart was a way players could communicate with each other and with guitar makers. Hall of fame steel players including Buddy Emmons, Jimmy Day, Ralph Mooney and others made contributions that created permanent changes to the instrument. Educator Mark Van Allen called the modern E9 tuning "logical" and the "perfect vehicle for most modern music". The example in the chart below is the one used by Buddy Emmons and, as of 2020, is by far the most popular copedent used by manufacturers to ship new pedal steel guitars to dealers.

The Nashville standard E9 ten-string, single-neck pedal steel guitar's copedent. (Adapted from GFI Music Company)

String	Gauge	Pitch	P1	P2	P3	LKL	V	LKR	RKL	RKR
1	.012p	F♯	-	-	-	-	-	-	++G♯	-
2	.015p	D♯	-	-	-	-	-	-	+E	-D/--C♯
3	.011p	G♯	-	+A	-	-	-	-	-	-
4	.014p	E	-	-	++F♯	+F	-	-D♯	-	-
5	.018p	B	++C♯	-	++C♯	-	-A♯	-	-	-
6	.022p	G♯	-	+A	-	-	-	-	--F♯	-
7	.026w	F♯	-	-	-	-	-	-	-	-
8	.030w	E	-	-	-	+F	-	-D♯	-	-
9	.034w	D	-	-	-	-	-	-	-	-C♯
10	.038w	B	++C♯	-	-	-	-A♯	-	-	-

Here is the meaning of the top row of abbreviations:

- String: The number of each string in order from far to near the player (The 1st string is the one furthest from the player).
- Gauge: The diameter of the string in thousandths of an inch. ("p" means plain and "w" means wound).
- Pitch: The concert pitch of each string. (Note: Sharps, not flats, are used here because the tuning is in the key of E.)
- P1: "Pedal 1"— Pushing pedal 1 raises the pitch of both the 5th string and the 10th string by two semitones to a C♯. (Note: These 2 strings are an octave apart, but the chart does not include that fact.) The other strings are unaffected.
- P2: Pedal 2 produces this result.
- P3: Pedal 3 produces this result.
- LKL: "Left knee left". (Note: There a 5 knee levers. Each of the player's knees has a lever on its medial and lateral side. When a knee is resting between its two levers, the original note is unaffected; when the knee moves left or right the pitch changes. The 5th lever is directly above the left knee and is actuated by lifting the knee vertically.) The left knee lever, when pushed to the left, raises the 4th string and the 8th string by one semitone, from E to F.
- V: "Vertical". Means that the left knee lever, when activated by raising the left knee vertically (toward the player's head), will lower both the 5th and the 10th string one semitone to an A♯.
- LKR: "Left knee right" The player's left knee, when it pushes to the right, produces this result.
- RKL: "Right knee left" The player's right knee, when it moves the lever left, produces this result.
- RKR: "Right Knee Right" Here the player's right knee, when leaned against the right lever, has 2 stops. A soft push lowers the 2nd and 9th string by only 1 semitone from their original pitches. A hard push lowers the 2nd string 2 semitones to a C♯ and simultaneously the 9th string only 1 semitone (both ending on C♯).

The originator of the term, Tom Bradshaw, said: "I toyed with several acronyms before coming up with 'copedent'. Frankly, I didn't like this word, but everything else I coined seemed even worse. As I wrote many times about why I came up with this word, I simply got tired of using 'set-up' to describe a player's basic tuning and the changes in that tuning when engaging pedals and knee levers. I wanted the pedal steel guitar to have nomenclature, by having identifying words and terms dedicated to it alone. In my early writings I always used the phrase 'tuning and pedal arrangement' to refer to a person's 'set-up'. It was in 1969 that I coined the copedent word, but initially spelled it 'chopedent'. The 'h' was from the first three letters of the word, chord. Obviously, including 'h' made the word's pronunciation even more difficult, so I quickly dropped that letter from its spelling after first printing it in a four-tune instructional course I published that year."

== C6 copedent ==
Many pedal steel guitarists play steel guitars with two necks. These instruments use the E9 copedent shown above on the neck farther away from the player. The neck nearer to the player is tuned to C6, and five more pedals change the pitches of the strings on this neck, as shown below. Steel guitarists typically use the C6 neck for playing in a jazz or Western Swing style. The tuning makes it easier to play the more complex chord voicings commonly associated with these kinds of music, and the heavier strings on the bottom contribute a "thicker" or "fatter" tone.

Below is a typical C6 copedent for a double–neck steel guitar. Notice that the first 3 pedals are blank, as is the V lever. Those spots are reserved for the E9 neck.

String	Gauge	Pitch	P1	P2	P3	P4	P5	P6	P7	P8	LKL	V	LKR	RKL	RKR
1	.012p	G	-	-	-	-	+G♯	-	-	-	-	-	-	-	-
2	.014p	E	-	-	-	-	-	+F	-	-	-	-	-	-	-
3	.017p	C	-	-	-	-	-	-	++D	-	-	-	-	-B	+C♯
4	.020p	A	-	-	-	++B	-	-	++B	-	-A♭	-	+B♭	-	-
5	.024w	G	-	-	-	-	-F♯	-	-	-	-	-	-	-	-
6	.030w	E	-	-	-	-	-	-E♭	-	-	-	-	-	-	-
7	.036w	C	-	-	-	-	-	-	-	+C♯	-	-	-	-	-
8	.042w	A	-	-	-	++B	-	-	-	-	-	-	-	-	-
9	.054w	F	-	-	-	-	+F♯	-	-	-E	-	-	-	-	-
10	.070w	C	-	-	-	-	++D	-	-	---A	-	-	-	-	-

This chart shows show the 4th pedal and the 8th pedal. It began that way, but in recent years, the 4th pedal has been eliminated, with the 8th pedal moved into its spot. The reason is that those two pedals are employed in succession. Having them side-by-side makes sense, according to Tom Bradshaw. Some pedal steel players refer to Pedal 8 as the "boo-wah", the "doo-wah", the "splat" pedal or the "ba-room" (bar-room) pedal, because of the sound the low C string makes when it drops the minor third to A. Using the term irritates some players because the pedal has many other uses, not just making an "effect".

== Universal 12-string copedent ==
In an effort to combine the advantages of each of the above tunings (E9 and C6) into a single-neck instrument, Jeff Newman developed a 12-string "universal tuning" in the mid 1970s using the E9th as the basic core. At approximately the same time, Maurice Anderson developed a 12-string "universal tuning", but the basic tuning was a B♭6th. Both players publicized their efforts, with the E9th "universal tuning" being the most common employed today by those preferring to use a "universal tuning." The universal copedent is the one with the most variations from player to player.

Below is an exampleː the Universal S-12, 8 pedal/5 knee lever copedent

String	Gauge	Pitch	P1	P2	P3	P4	P5	P6	P7	P8	LKL	V	LKR	RKL	RKR
1	.013p	F♯	-	-	-	-	+G	-	-	-	-	+G	-	-	-
2	.015p	D♯	-	-	-	-	-	-	-	-	-	-	-	-	-D
3	.011p	G♯	-	+A	-	-	-	-	-	-	-	-	-	-	-
4	.014p	E	-	-	++F♯	-	-	+E	-	-	+F	-	-E♭	-	-
5	.018p	B	++C♯	-	++C♯	-	-	-	++C♯	-	-	-	-	-B♭	-
6	.022w	G♯	-	+A	-	++A♯	-	-	++A♯	-	-	-	-	-	-
7	.026w	F♯	-	-	-	-	-F	-	-	-	-	+G	-	-	-
8	.030w	E	-	-	-	-	-	--D	-	-	+F	-	-E♭	-	-
9	.038w	B	++C♯	-	-	-	-	-	-	+C	-	-	-	-B♭	+++D
10	.046w	G♯	-	+A	-	++A♯	-	-	-	-	-	-	-	-	-
11	.056w	E	-	-	-	-	+F	-	-	-D♯	-	-	-	-	-
12	.068w	B	-	-	-	-	++C♯	-	-	---G♯	-	-	-	-	-
