= Hauyani =

Southern African guitar tuning method

Hauyani is a guitar tuning and method used in southern Africa, derived from the term "Hawaiian" (see Hawaiian guitar).. It refers to both a trichord tuning, as well as playing the guitar using a guitar slide or similar improvised object. A common tuning is GECgec, and it is found in countries such as Zimbabwe, Zambia, Malawi, and Mozambique. The technique may be related to indigenous techniques of playing local monochords with a smooth object to create glissando.
