= Tom Bradshaw (musician) =

American steel guitarist (born 1935)

Thomas Lewis Bradshaw (born February 14, 1935) is an American steel guitarist, journalist, music historian and businessman and who is known for his contributions to the pedagogy of steel guitar. He is a member of the Steel Guitar Hall of Fame (2006). Bradshaw is noted for creating what is now an international standard for describing how a steel guitar is configured, and coined the name "copedent" to describe it. NPR music writer Jesse Jarnow called Bradshaw "perhaps the world's leading authority on the instrument". Bradshaw played and repaired steel guitars and sold parts and accessories for the instruments for nearly a half-century. He was editor and publisher of Steel Guitarist magazine and was a columnist and writer for Guitar Player Magazine for many years, interviewing elite players and documenting steel guitar's evolution. His plaque in the Hall of Fame reads in part, " He was steel's foremost journalist of his time"

== Early life ==
Bradshaw was born in Skiatook, Oklahoma in 1935. His earliest musical recollection was listening to Bob Wills' radio broadcasts featuring steel guitarist Leon McAuliffe at noon every day. The family moved to Bakersfield, California, and when Bradshaw was in the seventh grade, a salesman from the Oahu Music Company came to his door, selling a series of steel guitar lessons. Bradshaw took group lessons at first, then private lessons after Oahu lost its lease on the building. He began with an acoustic steel guitar and moved up to an electric lap steel, a Rickenbacker with a Supro amp. The family moved to Monterey and in his early teens he played in a country music band there. As a high school sophomore, he got a triple-neck Fender lap steel. His idol was guitarist Jerry Byrd and he studied and memorized Byrd's solos.

== Career ==
Bradshaw attended college and became interested in criminal justice. After graduation he married, bought a house, and got a job as a probation officer. He later secured an executive position at the federal penitentiary in Tacoma Washington, and during that time got back into his hobby of playing music (after a 5-year hiatus). He became interested in music theory and wrote a monograph on steel guitar chord theory; he began selling it by mail for 3 dollars. As part of his mail-order business, he began collecting a list of steel guitarists in a database, a practice which would play a role in his future. In 1963, he took an executive job supervising parole officers at San Quentin Prison near San Francisco. In the Bay Area, he changed from lap steel to pedal steel in the 1960s, obtaining a Wright Custom double-10; he played music in a local bands on weekends for about 12 years. From his chord theory publication he received correspondence from many steel guitarists around the U.S. and made a point of answering every letter. His database grew.

He began to study the mechanisms of steel guitars, and wrote a monograph entitled, "Anatomy of the Pedal Guitar". In 1968, he organized a steel guitar show in Napa, California, attended by 500 people. In 1967 and 1969, he promoted even larger shows in Dallas, Texas, with displays by various manufacturers, and performances by noted players such as Tom Brumley and Jimmy Day. These shows, although successful, were not personally profitable for Bradshaw; however, the experience led him to the idea of selling steel guitar-related products via catalog sales. Additionally, he formed a mail order record club and obtained rights to reproduce various classic steel guitar records that were out of print. For example, he re-released 11 Jerry Byrd albums made from the 1940s to the 1970s. During this time he spent about 6 years as a columnist for Guitar Player Magazine, publishing many interviews with noted steel guitarists of the era. He created and published Steel Guitarist Magazine but it was not a financial success and folded in 1979.

== Contributions to steel guitar ==
Bradshaw coined several terms now common parlance for steel guitar teachers and players, including "string grips", "quaking', and "bar shiver". He is most widely known for the term "copedent" pronounced co-PEE-dent. It is a portmanteau of "chord-pedal-arrangement". It identifies (in chart form) the pedal steel guitar's basic tuning and how that tuning is altered by string pitch changes when pedals and knee levers are accuated; it also specifies the string number, position, gauge and winding. The term is now used internationally for manufacturers of these instruments to communicate what specifications their products have. Bradshaw said, "I wanted the pedal steel guitar to have nomenclature, by having identifying words and terms dedicated to it alone".
