= Fender 1000 =

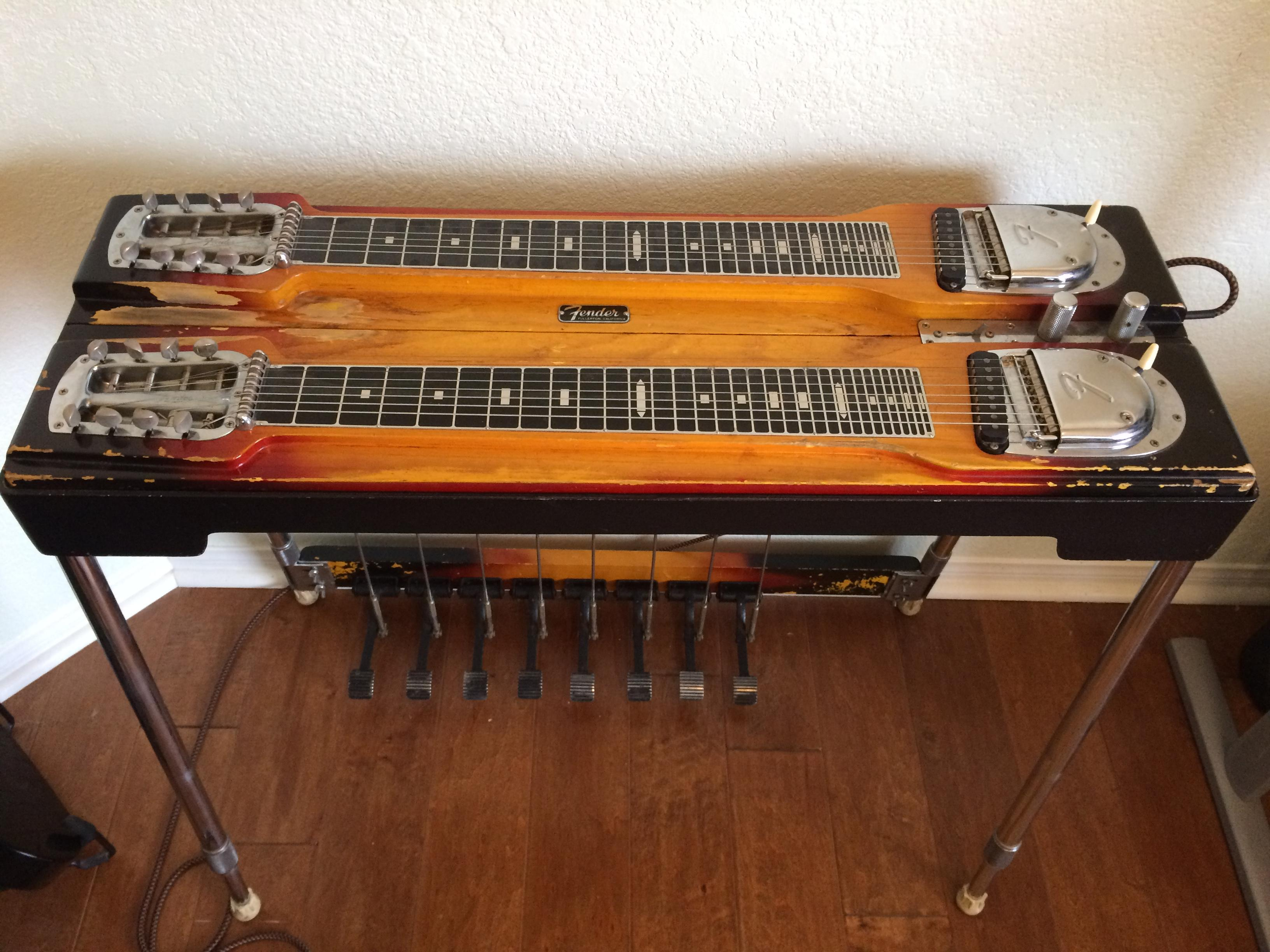
- Manufacturer: Fender
- Period: 1957-1970

Construction
- Body type: Solid
- Scale: 23 in (584 mm)

Woods
- Neck: Maple

Hardware
- Pickup: 2 proprietary single coils

Colors available
- Sunburst

The Fender 1000 is a model of pedal steel guitar manufactured by Fender in the 1950s and 1960s.

== History ==
Fender began producing the 1000 in 1957. It was marketed alongside its single-neck sibling, the Fender 400. At the time, it was an innovative instrument, but was quickly made obsolete as pedal steel players began to standardize Emmons and Day setups, requiring ten strings and knee levers in addition to pedals.

== Details ==
The guitar features two necks and eight pedals which act on the finger changers of either neck via a system of cables and pulleys. Each string may be pulled up or down in pitch. The adjusted pitch is adjusted via screws exposed on the right side of the instrument.

The scale length of early Fender 1000s is 24.5 in (622 mm), but changed to 23 in (584 mm) in the early 1960s. Other details such as foot pedal construction and bridge design also varied over the production life of the instrument.

The electronics feature a tone pot, volume pot, and three-way switch, which selects between either neck's pickup, or combines them.

The bridge assembly on some Fender 1000s incorporates a patented mute feature, which enables either neck's strings to be muted by raising a rubber mute underneath the strings behind the pickup. The mute is activated by a lever at the rear of the bridge cover.

For transportation, the guitar separates into body and a collection of pedals, pedal bars, and legs, which then pack into two cases.

== Tunings ==
Fender recommended an A6th tuning on the front neck, with six of the eight pedals acting on this tuning. On the rear neck, E7th was recommended with the remaining two pedals modifying this tuning.
