= Tom Brumley =

American pedal steel guitarist (1935–2009)

- Tom Brumley on cover of Steel Guitarist magazine, January, 1980

Background information
- Born: December 11, 1935; Stella, Missouri, United States
- Died: February 3, 2009 (aged 73) San Antonio, Texas, United States
- Genres: Country
- Occupation: Musician
- Instrument: Pedal steel guitar
- Years active: 1960–1990
- Formerly of: Buck Owens, The Buckaroos, Rick Nelson, The Desert Rose Band, The Strangers

Thomas Rexton Brumley (December 11, 1935 – February 3, 2009) was an American pedal steel guitarist and steel guitar manufacturer. In the 1960s, Brumley was a part of the sub-genre of country music known as the "Bakersfield sound". He performed with Buck Owens and the Buckaroos on hits such as "Cryin' Time" and "Together Again". His solo on "Together Again" received particular acclaim by critics. Brumley later spent a decade with Ricky Nelson and performed on "Garden Party" and the In Concert at the Troubadour, 1969 album.

In the 1960s Brumley purchased the manufacturing rights to Zane Beck's first pedal steel model and formed the ZB Guitar Company. Brumley later relocated the company to Texas, near his home in Kingsland where he managed the organization in his later years. He received an Academy of Country Music award for "Top Steel Guitarist" in 1966. Brumley was featured on the cover of Steel Guitarist Magazine in 1980, and is a member of the Steel Guitar Hall of Fame. His father was Albert E. Brumley, a noted gospel music songwriter and the composer of the classic "I'll Fly Away".

== Early life ==
Brumley was born on December 11, 1935, in Stella, Missouri, the third of six children. His father was Albert E. Brumley, a composer and music publisher who wrote over 700 gospel songs, including "I'll Fly Away" and "Turn Your Radio On". The father was a member of the Nashville Songwriters Hall of Fame (1970) and the Gospel Music Hall of Fame (1972). All six of his children played musical instruments but the father, who had an eighth grade education, made sure his children were well-rounded; they played sports as well as music and they all worked in the family business assembling songbooks in Powell, Missouri.

Tom started playing the bass as a teenager with his brothers Al, Bill, Bob and Jackson who formed "The Brumley Brothers Band" that performed at pie suppers and local music festivals. Tom received his first steel guitar by mail-order in 1954. He played jobs using it without knowing how to tune it, using a straight E major. He met a steel player in Joplin, Missouri who showed him how to tune to an C6 tuning. To learn new steel guitar "licks" Brumley listened to Nashville's Grand Ole Opry regularly and duplicated what he heard on the radio. One such broadcast featured Bud Isaacs. Brumley said "I turned my bar every way in the world, but I couldn't duplicate his sound". It wasn't until Isaacs played live in Joplin, Missouri, that Brumley went backstage and saw his first pedal steel guitar. Isaacs let him play it. The pedals altered the pitch of certain strings allowing notes and chords that were impossible to achieve on the lap steel that Brumley had been playing.

He served two years in the United States Army, stationed in Germany, and during that period he decided to pursue a career as a musician. He worked at his father's music publishing company after completing his military service.

== With Buck Owens ==
Tom Brumley's brother, Al Brumley Jr., had been signed by Capitol Records and Tom was asked to play steel guitar at a 1963 recording session. Buck Owens happened to be at the session and heard Brumley play, saying that he would hire him to play if he ever had the chance. At the time, Brumley lived in North Hollywood and played at clubs in the area, but moved to Kingsland, Texas, to work with his father-in-law, Rollie Spencer, at his construction firm. After the move to Texas, Brumley got a call to play with Owens; his reluctance to be back on the night scene at bars was mitigated by Mr. Spencer, who told him, "You know, if you don't do this, you'll wish you had. So I want you to try it. You can always come back to Kingsland, but at least you'll know what you want to do and won't be sorry".

"Together Again" by Buck Owens, 1964
Tom Brumley solo

Thin and boyish, Brumley worked for Buck Owens during the height of Owens' popularity from 1963 until 1969 and performed on some of Owens' biggest recordings including "Cryin' Time", "Under Your Spell Again", "Foolin' Around" and "Together Again". His performance on "Together Again" has been considered "one of the finest steel guitar solos in the history of country music", as described in an obituary by Country Music Television. Music writer Mark Deming echoed that statement, saying the solo was "widely celebrated as among the greatest pedal steel solos". According to the Los Angeles Times, his "pure" steel guitar sound was known in the music industry as "The Brumley Touch". He received an Academy of Country Music award for "Top Steel Guitarist" in 1966.

Buck Owens could be a difficult man to work for, according to his biographer Eileen Sisk who said, "He was prone to drastic mood swings". Brumley became good friends with Buck Owens' parents, whom he held in high regard. Owens' mother told Brumley that Ray Charles had called to ask Brumley to do an album with him; in fact, he had phoned two or three times. Buck Owens had declined the request without ever mentioning the matter to Brumley even though Owens had no exclusive contract with Brumley. The band's grueling schedule was hard on Brumley. He developed ulcers that required surgery. At six feet tall, his weight dropped from 150 to 132 pounds.

== Steel guitar manufacturing ==
After leaving Buck Owens, Brumley decided to get into the steel guitar manufacturing business. In the 1960s Brumley purchased the manufacturing rights to Zane Beck's first pedal steel model, the "ZK", and formed the ZB Guitar Company with investor Bill Sims. After several months of getting the company organized, Brumley received an offer to tour with Rick Nelson and the Stone Canyon Band. He and Sims agreed to let Sims manage the company while Brumley would promote the ZB brand with the cachet of playing that guitar with Nelson. Almost immediately, the Stone Canyon band and Nelson cut In Concert at the Troubadour, 1969 which became a landmark achievement for Nelson with a large boost in popularity. Ultimately, Brumley became sole owner of the guitar company in 1978 and relocated the factory to Kingsland, Texas. He sold the company to Basil Smith in 1985.

== With Rick Nelson ==
In 1969, Rick Nelson hired Brumley to play in his "Stone Canyon Band", so named for a street address in Sherman Oaks where they rehearsed. The band's musical signature was its prominent use of the pedal steel guitar, an instrument still relatively exotic to rock & roll. After two interim steel players, (Note: The interim players were Sneaky Pete Kleinow and Buddy Emmons.) Brumley was hired just days before they were set to record the live album In Concert at the Troubadour, 1969 . Beginning with a commitment of doing only four shows, Brumley ended up performing with Nelson for a decade. Brumly said, "The way we started out, every night he [Nelson] would add a little more steel [guitar] to the tunes being played . . . We didn't rehearse back then". With Nelson, Brumley liked the fact that "everything was first class"; the musicians traveled by air and they performed only 80 to 100 days a year, much less than the grueling schedule of Buck Owens. In a 2005 interview, Brumley called it "a godsend being asked to join Rick's band, and I still think "Garden Party" was a highlight of my recording career". Country music singer Marty Stuart, speaking of Brumley, said "He was also, in my opinion, one of the cornerstone guys that kind of bridged country music and rock'n'roll, as well, with his Rick Nelson works". One of the Brumley's bandmates in the Stone Canyon Band was Randy Meisner, a founding member of the Eagles who was co-author and vocalist of the Eagles' "Take It To The Limit". Meisner was with them for some time and performed with them on the Troubadour album. Brumley left Nelson because the touring schedule kept getting heavier, by then 180 days per year, with plans to increase it after a new manager was brought on board. Brumley was also eager to return home to Kingsland and manage his guitar company.

== Later career ==
During a short hiatus from working with Rick Nelson, Brumley played pedal steel guitar on Guthrie Thomas' album Lies and Alibis (1976). He spent three years with Chris Hillman and The Desert Rose Band during the early 1990s. In 1989, Brumley retired from touring to rejoin his brother, Al Brumley Jr. to form the "Brumley Family Music Show" at the 76 Music Hall in Branson (1989 to 2003). The show included Tom's sons Todd and Tommy. He performed or recorded with artists including Glen Campbell, Guthrie Thomas, Merle Haggard, Dwight Yoakam, Chris Isaak, Waylon Jennings, Martina McBride, Reba McEntire, Ray Price and Rod Stewart. Brumley was inducted into the Texas Steel Guitar Hall of Fame, the International Steel Guitar Hall of Fame, and the Missouri Country Music Hall of Fame.

In 1999, he was asked to record with the Light Crust Doughboys by invitation of Doughboys Grammy Award-winning artist-producer Art Greenhaw, a lifelong fan of Brumley. The recordings took place over a several-year period in Branson and Dallas, and spanned several musical genres including gospel, country, country-rock and patriotic music. Four albums were released featuring Brumley with the Doughboys between 2000 and 2005. In 2009, the album entitled The R&B Americana Album: Soul Cats Meet Hillbilly Cats, was released just months after Brumley's death. It was a collaboration of Brumley, Larry "T-Byrd" Gordon, and Art Greenhaw.

Brumley died at age 73 on February 3, 2009, at Northeast Baptist Hospital in San Antonio, a little more than a week after experiencing a heart attack. He was survived by his wife of 48 years, Rolene, two sons, a daughter, six grandchildren and a great-grandson.
