= Nick Manoloff =

Bulgarian manufacturer (1898–1969)

Nick Manoloff (1898-1969) was a manufacturer of steels/tone bars for stringed instruments to use for the method of steel guitar, an arranger and author of instrument method books and sheet music, and a distributor of musical supplies and publications.

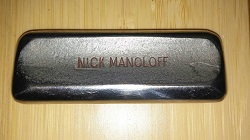
Nick Manoloff steel, traditional flat style

== Early life ==
Nick Manoloff was born Nicola Manoloff on April 3, 1898, in Bulgaria. He immigrated to the east coast of the United States in 1922. In 1935, he established residency in Chicago, Illinois, with his wife Bernice (1909-?), who had immigrated to America from Latvia/Yugoslavia. They had a son, Nicki Manoloff, born in Chicago in 1937, and two daughters, Bernice and Denna.

== Venture into business ==
=== Manufacturing ===
Manoloff invented the Nick Manoloff Tone Bar. He was granted a patent (#2073331) on March 9, 1937. The tone bar or steel was made of the revolutionary synthetic material known as bakelite. Bakelite (/ˈbeɪkəlaɪt/ BAY-kə-lyt, sometimes spelled Baekelite[3]), or polyoxybenzylmethylenglycolanhydride, is an early plastic. It is a thermosetting phenol formaldehyde resin, formed from an elimination reaction of phenol with formaldehyde. It was developed by Belgian-born chemist Leo Baekeland in New York in 1907. These slides were 2.75" in length, 0.75" in diameter, round on the tip end and flat on the other with inscription, "Nick Manoloff Pat. 2076331." They were in an array of colors such as solid black or white marbleized/swirl: red and white; green and white; jade green and white; chocolate and white; and red and black. He made slides of several styles and sizes of metal, usually of high polished chrome, with the inscription of his name "NICK MANOLOFF". He designed steels and accessories for the dobro, Hawaiian guitar, resonator guitar, Spanish guitar, resonator mandolin, lap steel guitar, and pedal steel guitar.

=== Publishing ===
In the early 1930s, Nick and Bernice were musical arrangers, eventually forming the Calumet Music Publishing Company. For many publications, Nick and Bernice arranged songs, music, and instructional methods for stringed instruments such as the guitar, dobro, and ukulele—particularly for music played with a slide. Over 180 works by Nick appeared in over 253 publications. An example was the method book Nick Manoloff's Complete Chord and Harmony Manual for the Guitar. Bernice arranged many, including books (The Bee). They largely specialized in Hawaiian, folk and cowboy songs, Russian music, and standards.

=== Sales ===
Nick and Bernice Manoloff formed a distributing business called Manoloff's Musical Supply at 7018 S. Ashland Avenue, Chicago. Until 1968, the business employed four men and three women. They sold slides, metal thumb and finger picks (etched with Manoloff's name), capos, flat picks, sheet music, and books.

== Death ==
Nick Manoloff died in Los Angeles, California, in 1969.

== Publications ==
=== Nick related ===
- Cole's Spanish Guitar Method: Book No. 1 (1932)
- Nick Manoloff's Hawaiian Guitar Method. Number System. Book 1. (1933)
- Nick Manoloff's Spanish Guitar Method - Book 3. (1934)
- Hawaiian Guitar Supplement (1934)
- Nick Manoloff's Spanish Guitar Method Book No. 1 (1935)
- Nick Manoloff's Modern Spanish Guitar Solos (1935)
- Sun of My Soul. Sheet music (1935)
- Dark Eyes: Russian Gypsy Ballad (with Hawaiian guitar chords, ukulele chords, guitar chords). English lyrics by Bernice Manoloff and Arranged by Nick Manoloff. (1935),
- God Be with You Till We Meet Again, with ukulele chords, guitar chords and special Hawaiian guitar chorus(1935)
- Cole's Spanish Guitar Method Book (1935)
- Bury Me Out on the Prairie arranged by Nick Manoloff(1935)
- A Home on the Range by Nick Manoloff (1935)
- Nick Manoloff's Modern Accompaniment Guide for Spanish Guitar. Paper riveted dial.(1935)
- Nick Manoloff's Hawaiian Guitar Method, Book 1 Number System (1936)
- Nick Manoloff's Mandolin Method (1938)
- Nick Manoloff's Hawaiian Guitar Method High Bass Tuning (1939)
- Little Brown Jug. Sheet music (1941)
- Nick Manoloff's Baritone Ukulele Method (1953)
- Nick Manoloff's 100 Guitar Solos (1962)
- Nick Manoloff's Guitar Chord and Harmony Manual (1962)
- Plectrum Style Guitar Method (1968)
- Nick Manoloff's Spanish Guitar Method (Book 1, new revised edition)(1968)

=== Bernice related ===
- Miami Blues (for Hawaiian guitar) sheet music (1936)
