= Pedal steel guitar =

Musical instrument

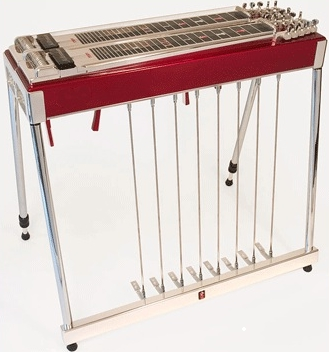
Modern pedal steel guitar with two necks. It has 3 pedals for the E9 neck (farther from the player), and 4 pedals for the C6 Neck (closer to the player). Knee levers seen protruding below the frame.

The pedal steel guitar is a string instrument mounted horizontally on a frame and played while seated. The player typically plucks the strings with the right hand while moving a steel bar along the strings with the left. The instrument has no resonance chamber; its sound is transmitted by an electric pickup to an amplifier. Like all steel guitars, the pedal steel can produce smooth glissandi (sliding notes) and controlled vibrato, expressive techniques akin to the human singing voice.

What distinguishes the pedal steel from earlier steel guitars is a set of foot pedals and knee levers that raise or lower the pitch of selected strings. The mechanism was developed in the United States during the 1940s and 1950s to extend the instrument's harmonic capabilities. It allowed players to form chords and voicings that were previously unavailable on a steel guitar, and its pedals enabled distinctive sounds that became a defining element of country music in the latter half of the twentieth century.

The first No. 1 Billboard country recording to feature pedal steel was Webb Pierce's 1954 song, "Slowly", on which Bud Isaacs demonstrated a novel technique of pushing a pedal to change pitches within a chord while existing notes in it were still sounding. The popularity of this unique harmonic motif influenced lap steel guitarists to switch to pedal-equipped instruments.

Innovations by Buddy Emmons, Jimmy Day, Zane Beck, Paul Bigsby, and others established many of the mechanical and tuning conventions used on the modern pedal steel guitar. Although most closely associated with country music, the pedal steel has also been adopted in diverse genres, including western swing, jazz, rock, pop and Sacred Steel.

== Design and operation ==
A typical modern E9 pedal steel has ten strings, three foot pedals, and five knee levers. The designation of the chord “E9” does not mean that all ten strings are ordinarily sounded together to make that chord.

E9 Pedal Steel Guitar Tuning, strings 1–10

Rather, the tuning (open strings, no pedals or levers) contains the notes of an E9 chord on strings 3, 4, 5, 6, 8, and 10, along with additional notes that provide melodic and harmonic possibilities. Typically, a player attaches picks on the thumb, index, and middle fingers of the right hand, and selects compatible groups of strings, commonly called “grips,” to produce particular chords or voicings. The left hand lightly presses the steel (a polished steel bar) on a perpendicular angle across the strings, and moves it along the neck to change the pitch as the strings are being plucked. The instrument has no frets, only markers that look like frets to serve as visual guides for positioning the bar. Modern pedal steel players may push pedals while the strings are sounding and the bar is in motion. The pedals and knee levers will allow playing a major scale using pedals without moving the bar.

=== The mechanism ===
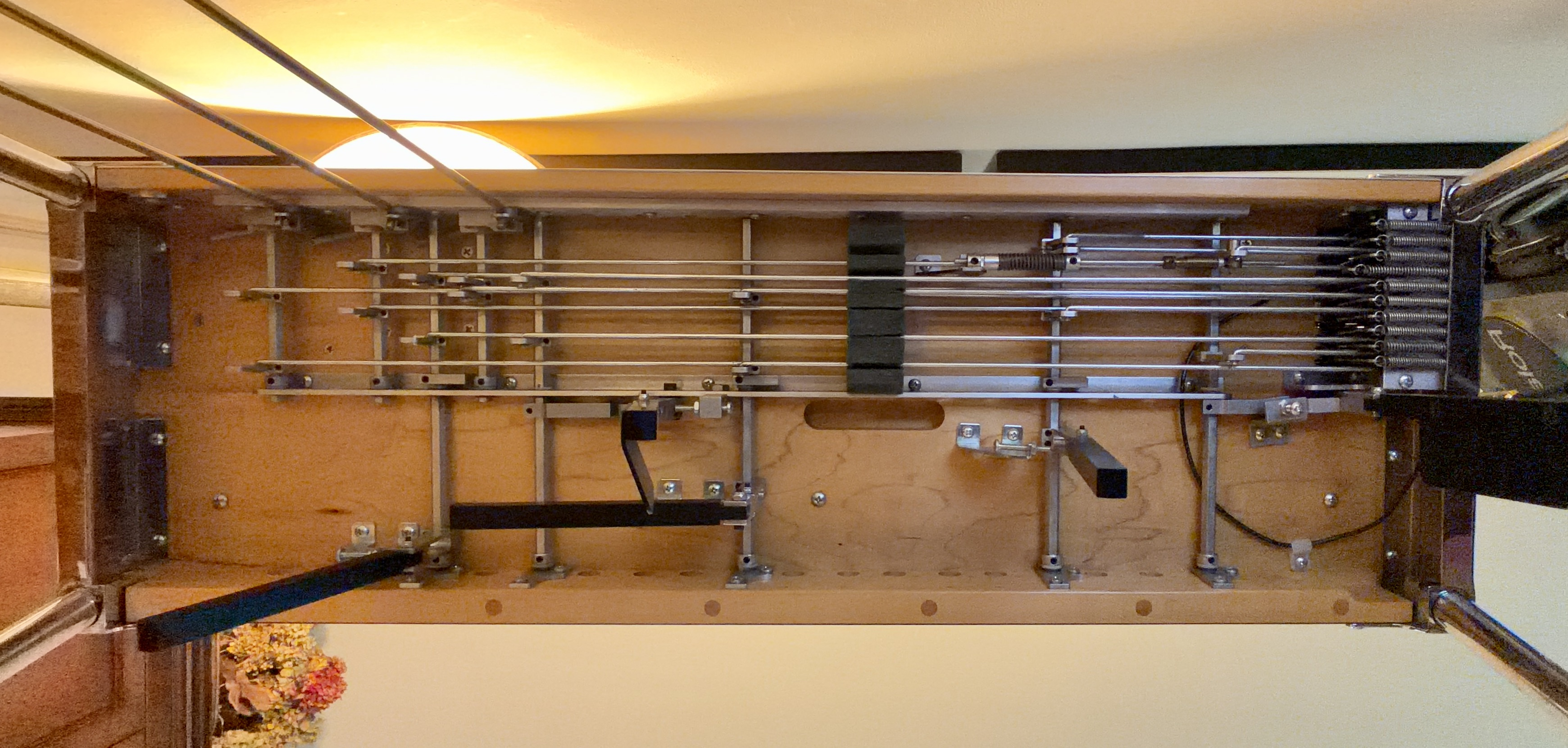
Underside of a single-neck E9 pedal steel guitar, showing the pedal rods (top left), cross shafts, pull rods, and changer mechanism (right).

The foot pedals are attached to long metal rods linked to pivot shafts beneath the instrument. These shafts operate pull rods that extend across the underbody to individual changer fingers at the end of the guitar (pictured). Each string is attached to a changer finger which rotates slightly when a pedal or knee lever is activated. This action changes the string’s tension and raises or lowers its pitch by a predetermined interval, commonly a semitone or whole tone.

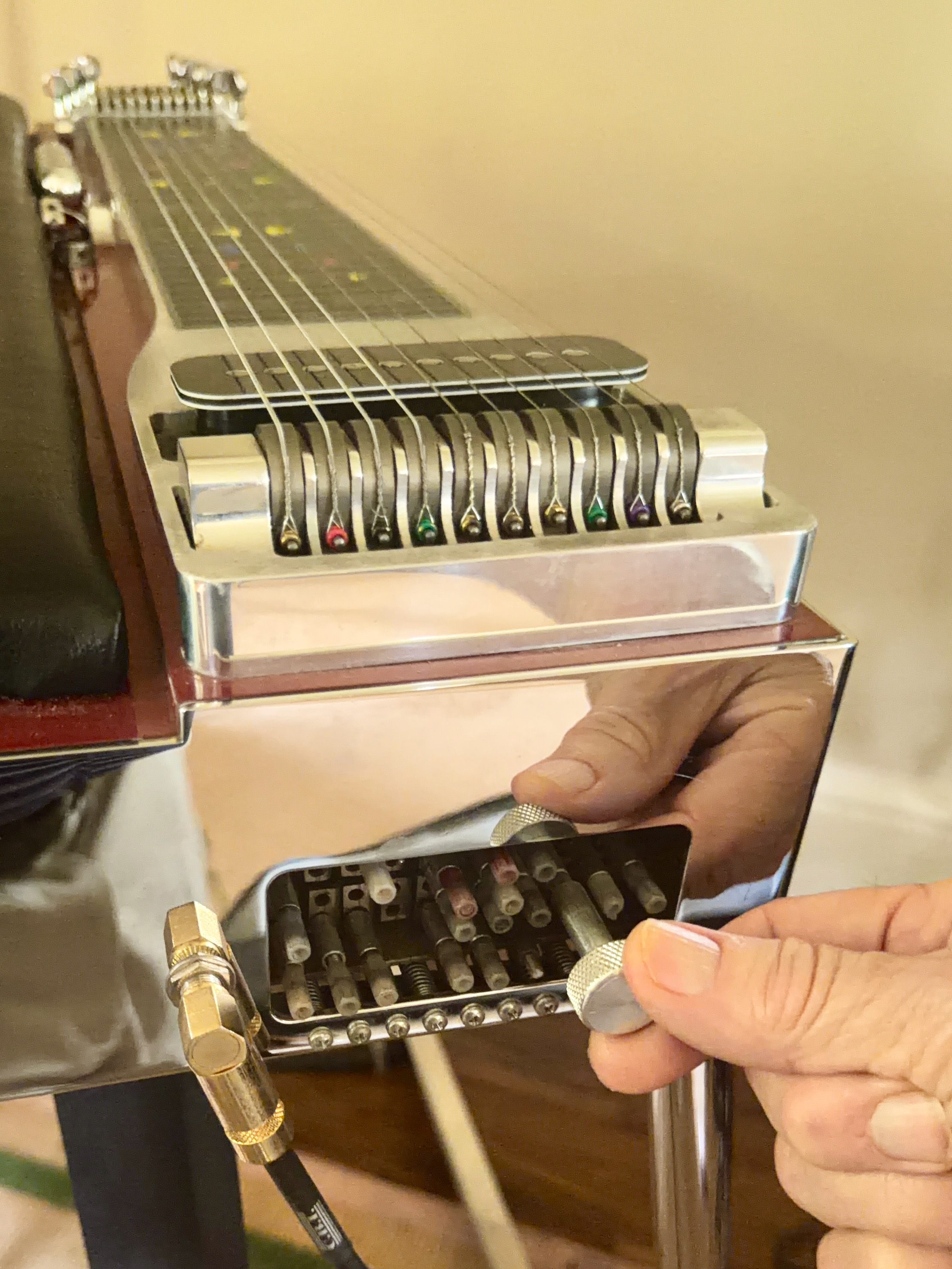
E9 pedal-tuning adjustment with tuning wrench—shows changer fingers above.

When the pedal or lever is released, springs return the string to its original pitch.

=== Tuning the pedals ===
The open strings are tuned at the instrument's headstock as on a conventional guitar, but changes produced by the pedals and knee levers are adjusted independently in a small compartment at the end of the guitar on the player's right (pictured). It houses recessed rows of hexagonal nylon tuning rods, each mechanically linked to a pedal or lever. The purpose is to correct a common problem whereby a chord struck without touching a pedal may be in perfect tune, but pushing the pedal produces an out-of-tune chord. To correct it, the pedal itself is held down while the appropriate tuning rod is adjusted to correct pitch with a tuning wrench (pictured). These adjustments are made only after the open strings have been tuned accurately.

=== Volume pedal ===
A volume pedal, also known as an expression pedal, is a standard accessory and an important source of the instrument’s characteristic sustained and flowing sound. The pedal is not a part of the instrument itself, but is plugged in between the guitar and the amplifier. The volume pedal is operated by the player’s right foot, which typically rests on the volume pedal at all times.

Rather than serving merely as a volume control, the pedal is used dynamically: the player may reduce the volume level during the initial “attack” then increase volume as the note decays, extending apparent sustain. This tactic reduces the initial string noise on the pick's first contact with the string, and creates an effect similar to the entry of a violin section.

== Development ==
The pedal steel guitar emerged from earlier steel guitar designs. The acoustic Hawaiian guitar, now called the lap steel, was followed by resonator guitars modified to make them louder. The development of the electromagnetic pickup in the early 1930s led to electrified lap steels and, subsequently, console steels. The popularity of electric instruments encouraged the production of dedicated guitar amplifiers and freed instrument makers from the need to retain the traditional guitar shape. Manufacturers rapidly began producing rectangular steel guitars with electric pickups, precursors of the pedal steel.

By the late 1940s, the harmonic limitations of fixed tunings on a steel guitar had become increasingly apparent to musicians. According to author Winnie Winston, "the limitations of playing all notes in a straight line became obvious." Certain chords were virtually impossible to make, and players needed a way to have different voicings on the same guitar without stopping to retune. To get those voicings, scores of different tunings were tried by lap steel players. Some musicians kept an additional lap steel (with an alternate tuning) on hand to be used for certain songs. Players learned to slant the bar across the strings to obtain individual notes within a chord. Accurate intonation doing this requires considerable practice because the necessary angle varies with string spacing and fret position; in three-note slants, it may be impossible to bring every note precisely into tune. Another attempted solution was to add more strings, thereby extending the instrument’s range and allowing narrower pitch intervals between strings. Adding strings was another incremental step toward making more harmonically complex songs possible.

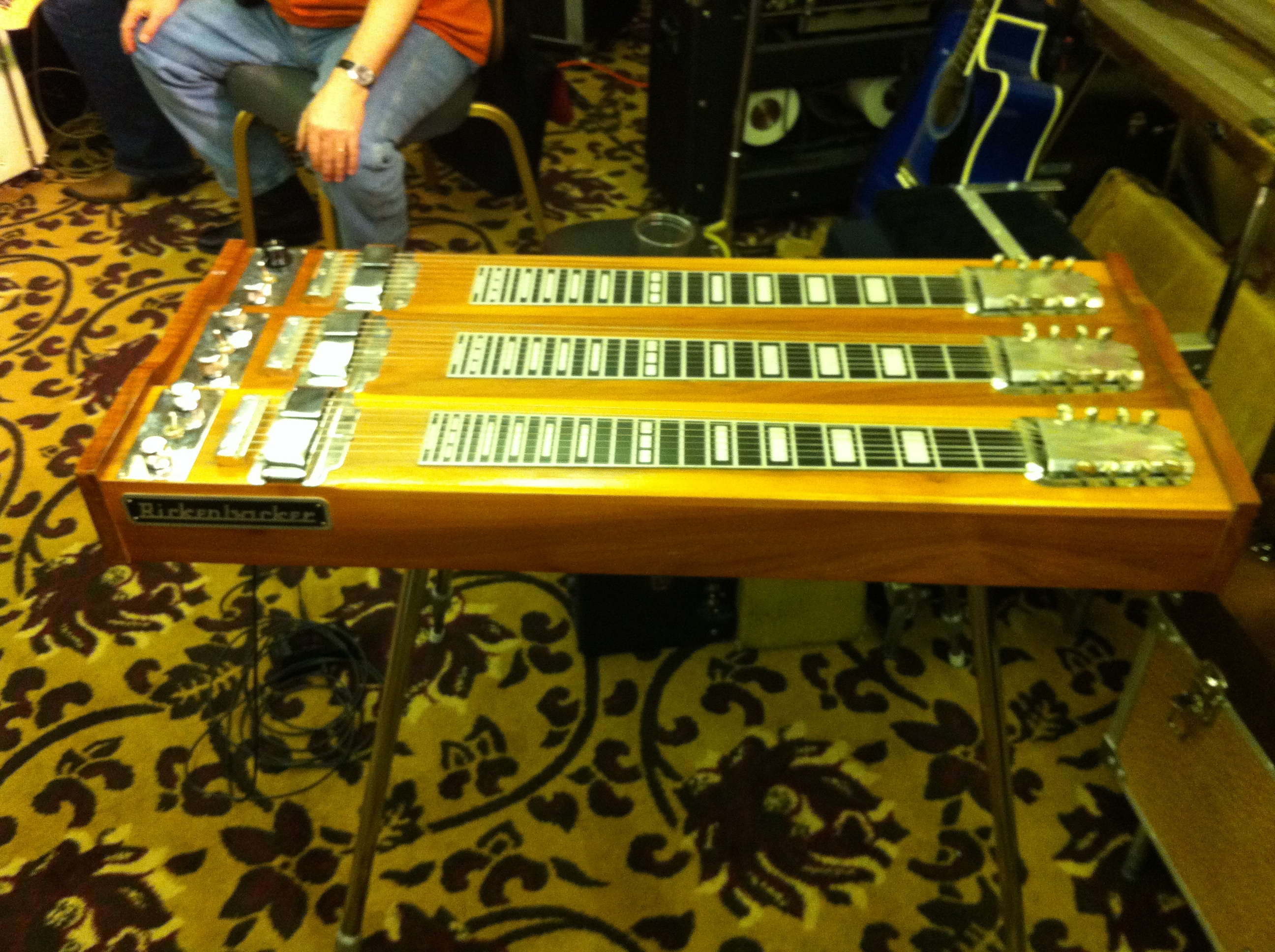
Rickenbacker Console 758 tripleneck steel

Musicians began placing two or more differently tuned necks on the same instrument. Performers such as Noel Boggs and Leon McAuliffe routinely switched between necks during a performance, and triple-neck instruments such as the Fender Stringmaster or a Rickenbacker 758 remained in use well into the 1950s. The trend culminated in guitars with as many as four different necks. Although effective, multi-neck console steels were cumbersome and unaffordable by many musicians, leading inventors to seek a mechanical alternative.

== Early pedal mechanisms ==
Initially, musicians sought a pedal mechanism that would change the pitch of all the strings simultaneously, effectively emulating a second neck. In 1939, bandleader Alvino Rey worked with machinist John Moore to design a pedal-operated electric steel guitar. Gibson subsequently introduced Rey's design in 1940 as the "Electraharp", which featured pedals radially oriented from a single axis at the instrument's left rear leg. Only 43 were sold before production was halted, but the U.S. entry into World War II may have been a factor. After the war, Gibson redesigned and reintroduced the Electraharp and Bud Isaacs used one on the song "Big Blue Diamonds" for King Records. Jay D. Harlin and his brothers in Indianapolis developed the Multi-Kord, whose pedal mechanisms could be configured to raise or lower any combination of strings. Pedal resistance increased with the number of strings being changed simultaneously.

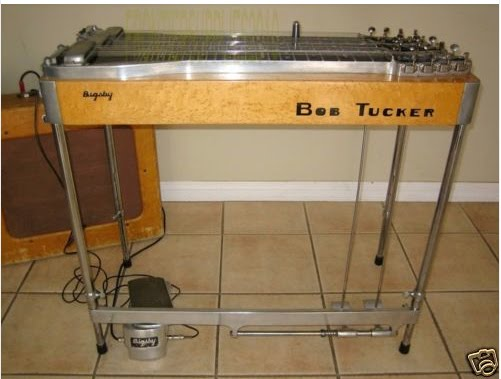
Bigsby pedal steel guitar

None of these proposals caught on with musicians enough to diminish the popularity of the multi-necked instruments.

=== Paul Bigsby ===
One of the most influential pedal innovations among the various competing designs was developed in the late 1940s by a southern California man named Paul Bigsby, a former industrial pattern maker, motorcycle engineer, racer, and amateur musician. Later in his career he turned to musical instrument design. Bigsby achieved commercial success with a vibrato tailpiece he designed for conventional guitars, and he built quality multi-neck lap steels played by prominent artists. Aware of the lap steel’s limitations, he sought a more practical means of overcoming them. He developed a cable-and-pulley mechanism operated by foot pedals mounted on a rack between the instrument’s front legs. His first pedal steel guitar was made in 1948 for Speedy West. The effectiveness of Bigsby’s mechanism quickly attracted attention, and he was asked to build pedal steels for leading American players, including West, Noel Boggs, and Bud Isaacs. He built each instrument individually in a small shop behind his home, eventually accumulating a waiting list of approximately two years. Speedy West remembered Bigsby as a perfectionist who performed every aspect of the work himself, including the administrative duties: “He would not hire employees ... he just didn’t think anyone else could do what Paul Bigsby could do.”

== Bud Isaacs' country music breakthrough ==
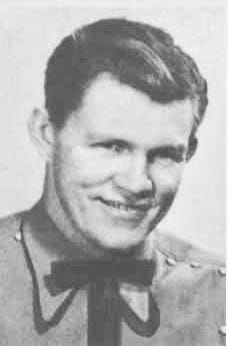

In 1953, Bud Isaacs received one of Bigsby's new creations, a double-neck steel which featured one pedal for each neck to change the pitch of two strings. In practicing while learning to use the pedal, Isaacs pushed it while notes in a chord were still sounding. Other steel players strictly avoided doing this, because it was considered "un-Hawaiian".

"Slowly" by Webb Pierce

When Isaacs was in a studio session in 1953, recording Webb Pierce's song, "Slowly", he pushed the pedal while notes were still sounding; the producer liked the effect and encouraged him to use it. One note remained the same, while one or two lower strings slurred upward to harmonize with it. Perfect intonation of both the starting and finishing chords was achieved.

E9 Pedal steel guitar, demonstrating use of pedals alone on open strings without using the bar

This unique harmonic motif was virtually impossible with the older (non-pedal) lap steels. (Note: Theoretically, it was possible on a lap steel, but not possible to play it rapidly with perfect intonation; the pedal version was immediately recognizable.) The resulting distinctive style of playing became a defining characteristic of the country music coming out of Nashville for decades thereafter. When the record was released in 1954, it caused a virtual revolution among lap steel players across the nation who wanted to adapt their non-pedal instruments to duplicate that lick—to the extent of trying to build homemade pedal mechanisms. The song was the first Billboard country chart-topper to feature pedal steel.

== Standardization of the modern pedal instrument ==
The pedal steel design rapidly eclipsed the lap steel as many players switched to pedal models in the 1950s. Eventually, only pockets of lap steel devotees were left in country and Hawaiian music. The pedal steel became the dominant steel guitar heard in country music.

=== Buddy Emmons ===
When Webb Pierce's "Slowly" was released in 1954, Paul Bigsby was in the process of building a new pedal steel guitar for Buddy Emmons. After hearing Bud Isaacs bend two strings simultaneously with a single pedal on the recording, Emmons asked Bigsby to make his guitar setup to split the function of Isaacs' single pedal into two pedals, each controlling a different string. He could easily push both pedals simultaneously to achieve the same effect as Isaacs, but had the option to push either independently, giving more options to play minors and suspended chords without moving or slanting the bar. This "split-pedal" setup soon became the standard in the E9 tuning. Jimmy Day had the same idea, but reversed which strings were affected by the two pedals. This prompted future manufacturers to ask customers if they wanted a "Day" or an "Emmons" setup. In 1957, Emmons partnered with guitarist/machinist Harold "Shot" Jackson to form the Sho-Bud company (a portmanteau of their first names), the first company devoted solely to pedal steel guitar manufacture. Emmons later expanded the standard tuning by adding two chromatic strings and a third pedal, giving players greater melodic range and harmonic flexibility. Sho-Bud instruments incorporated all the innovations developed through the 1950s, including 10 strings, the third pedal, and Beck’s knee levers, standardizing the E9 single-neck pedal steel guitar.

=== Knee levers ===
Steel Guitar Hall of Fame member Zane Beck pioneered the use of knee levers in the 1950s, and was the first to install them on production guitars. Beck extended the pedal concept by recruiting the player's knees to control a separate mechanism to lower the pitch of certain strings. The levers are located unobtrusively underneath the body of the guitar, protruding downward on each side of each of the player's knees. The addition greatly expanded the instrument’s harmonic possibilities. Depending on the instrument, the player operates the levers by moving either knee to the left or right or by raising it. Like foot pedals, knee levers change the pitch of selected strings and may be used alone, with another knee lever, or in combination with the pedals. Beck’s original knee levers lowered string pitches rather than raising them; on modern pedal steels, knee levers may be configured to raise or lower strings.

=== Copedent ===
Tom Bradshaw was an American musician and journalist who was a columnist for Guitar Player Magazine for many years. In the early 1970s, recognizing the difficulty of describing the different pedal and lever arrangements used by individual players, he devised a standardized scheme to communicate it. He coined the word copedent (koh-PEE-dənt), a portmanteau of "chord-pedal-arrangement". The term is unique to pedal steel guitar. Represented in table form, the copedent chart was a way players could communicate with each other and with guitar manufacturers.

Example of copedent chart for an E9 pedal steel: (Adapted from GFI Musical Products)

P–1 = pedal one, LKL = left knee left, V= knee upwards (vertical). +A means this action raises one semitone from G# to A. Slash= half-push/full-push.

| String | Gauge | Pitch | P1 | P2 | P3 | LKL | V | LKR | RKL | RKR |
|---|---|---|---|---|---|---|---|---|---|---|
| 1 | .012p | F♯ | - | - | - | - | - | - | ++G♯ | - |
| 2 | .015p | D♯ | - | - | - | - | - | - | +E | -D/--C♯ |
| 3 | .011p | G♯ | - | +A | - | - | - | - | - | - |
| 4 | .014p | E | - | - | ++F♯ | +F | - | -D♯ | - | - |
| 5 | .018p | B | ++C♯ | - | ++C♯ | - | -A♯ | - | - | - |
| 6 | .022p | G♯ | - | +A | - | - | - | - | --F♯ | - |
| 7 | .026w | F♯ | - | - | - | - | - | - | - | - |
| 8 | .030w | E | - | - | - | +F | - | -D♯ | - | - |
| 9 | .034w | D | - | - | - | - | - | - | - | -C♯ |
| 10 | .038w | B | ++C♯ | - | - | - | -A♯ | - | - | - |

== E9 and C6 necks ==
Since the 1950s, the double-neck pedal steel has been widely used by professional players. The tuning of each neck evolved for different musical idioms and became associated with them. The C6 neck (closer to the player) is typically used for western swing or jazz music and the E9 neck (further from the player) is usually used for country music. The E9 has become the dominant tuning in modern usage.

=== Evolution of the C6 (Texas tuning) ===
Experimentation with alternate tunings was a widespread practice among Hawaiian musicians of the 1930s,and provided templates that became a foundation for the playing style of later musicians. In the late 1930s, lap steel player Jerry Byrd, who had a background in Hawaiian music, popularized the C6 tuning in early country music. The addition of a sixth interval into a tuning had a significant effect on the steel guitar sound because it created numerous positions and chords that were not accessible in a simple major chord. Tunings with a sixth interval were easily recognizable, and became common in western swing and jazz.

=== Evolution of the E9 (Nashville tuning) ===
The Nashville E9 tuning, also known as the "E9 Chromatic Tuning", is the tuning most closely associated with modern country pedal steel. It evolved from the 1950s through the early 1970s through experimentation and incremental innovations by the most prominent players of the era, including Buddy Emmons, Jimmy Day, and Ralph Mooney. Many of their ideas were subsequently incorporated into the standard E9 setup. By the mid-1970s, major manufacturers had largely standardized the ten-string E9 instrument with three pedals and four knee levers, although individual players continued to customize their guitars.

=== Comparison of the sounds C6 and E9 tunings ===
Pedal Steel demo of E9 tuning

Demo of a C6 tuning demonstrating complex chords and low register (played by Buddy Emmons)

The standard ten-string C6 tuning has a substantially lower range than the standard ten-string E9 tuning. According to author Timothy Miller, some musicians historically considered the E9 an entry point instrument, and C6 the more authentic platform that better players used. Miller identifies Lloyd Green's decision in 1972 to concentrate exclusively on E9 to be one factor in the tuning's growing dominance. One of the highest-profile steel players of the time, Green declared that not only was the C6 "not a profitable pursuit," but that the E9 fulfilled his musical needs. He dismantled the C6 neck on his instrument and installed a padded arm rest in its place.

== Universal tuning ==
There are proponents of a universal tuning that combines many of the functions of the E9 and C6 tunings on a single 12- or 14- string neck. Maurice "Reece" Anderson was an early proponent of the universal concept, saying that, with the advances in the mechanisms being developed, the idea was feasible. Anderson developed a B♭6-based tuning that incorporated ninth-tuning functions. The 12-string E9/B6 version was subsequently popularized by steel guitarist and instructor Jeff Newman. In a typical E9/B6 universal tuning, the open strings retain the principal features of E9. Lowering the E strings to E♭ (D♯) with a knee lever produces a B6-based configuration, while additional pedals and knee levers provide many of the functions associated with the C6 neck. The arrangement therefore allows much of the characteristic E9 and C6 vocabulary to be played on a single neck.

== Pedal steel in country music ==
Following the success of “Slowly” in 1954, the pedal steel rapidly became a defining element of country music. During the emergence of the Nashville sound between approximately 1957 and 1962, record producers were looking for broader pop appeal, and often reduced the prominence of steel guitar and fiddle in favor of background vocal groups, piano, and lush orchestral string arrangements. The instrument nevertheless remained important during the 1960s: Nashville session players such as Pete Drake, Buddy Emmons, and Lloyd Green adapted it to polished studio arrangements, West Coast players including Ralph Mooney and Tom Brumley contributed a distinct regional style associated with the Bakersfield sound. The pedal steel continued as an identifying feature of country music, although its prominence varied as production styles changed.

== Pedal steel use outside country music ==
=== Jazz ===
Examples of jazz played on pedal steel guitar span from 1950s–60s recordings to contemporary avant-garde and modern jazz albums. Buddy Emmons' Steel Guitar Jazz (1963, Verve) was an early full-length jazz album led by a pedal steel guitarist. Emmons continued exploring jazz throughout his career, including sideman work with vibraphonist Gary Burton and guitarist Lenny Breau, and a late-1970s partnership with guitarist Danny Gatton called the Redneck Jazz Explosion, documented on live recordings from Washington, D.C.'s Cellar Door club. Reuben Gosfield, a pedal steel player who used the stage name Lucky Oceans, was co-founder of the western-swing revivalists Asleep at the Wheel, often playing Count Basie and Louis Jordan songs. Doug Jernigan became known for infusing country pedal steel with jazz, playing rapid single-note solos at fast speeds rivaling banjo and fiddle players. As a youth, Jernigan was befriended by Buddy Emmons, nine years his senior, who invited him to his home and customized Jernigan's steel to the "Nashville Setup" Jernigan’s interest in jazz led Flying Fish Records to pair him with jazz guitarist Bucky Pizzarelli for an album. Jernigan said, "I explained to him [Pizzarelli] that I was basically a country player. What we were trying to do was to show what the steel guitar can be, by teaming up me, a pedal steel guitarist, with a jazz player of the caliber of someone like him". Jernigan prefers the C6 tuning which is better for jazz, but says "I have to play the E9 in Nashville — you know, for making money".

A later generation of players pushed the instrument further into jazz and free improvisation. Susan Alcorn (1953–2025) became a leading voice in avant-garde and free-jazz pedal steel; her quintet album Pedernal, with bassist Michael Formanek and guitarist Mary Halvorson, was named one of 2020's best jazz albums by The New York Times.

=== Rock and pop music ===
Pedal steel crossed into rock and pop starting in the late 1960s, as country influences entered mainstream popular music. Sneaky Pete Kleinow became an important early exponent of pedal steel in a rock setting, first with The Byrds and then as a founding member of the Flying Burrito Brothers alongside Gram Parsons. Parsons' vision of a "Cosmic American Music" typically used pedal steel guitar with rock songwriting. The Byrds' 1968 album Sweetheart of the Rodeo, an influential recording in the emergence of country rock, featured session pedal steel guitarists Lloyd Green and JayDee Maness. Reviewer Mark Deming said, "No major band had gone so deep into the sound and feeling of classic country".

In Nashville, Pete Drake became a sought-after session player whose understated approach made him a fixture on country and pop recordings through the 1960s and 1970s. He was the first pedal steel guitarist to be inducted into the Country Music Hall of Fame. Drake played pedal steel on two tracks of Bob Dylan's 1967 album John Wesley Harding, recorded in Nashville, which helped draw wider pop and rock attention to the instrument. On Dylan's recommendation, George Harrison later invited Drake to London to record pedal steel for several tracks on Harrison's 1970 triple album All Things Must Pass.

Other steel players became closely identified with individual rock and pop acts. The Eagles multi-instrumentalist Bernie Leadon played pedal steel on early recordings including “Best of My Love” and “My Man,” while Al Perkins, formerly of the Flying Burrito Brothers and later a member of Stephen Stills’ band Manassas, played pedal steel on “Ol’ ’55.”

=== Sacred steel ===
In the late 1930s, musicians in the House of God, Keith Dominion—an African American Holiness-Pentecostal denomination headquartered in Nashville—began using electric steel guitars in worship. The tradition also developed in the related Jewell Dominion, headquartered in Indianapolis. The steel guitar was embraced by the congregation and often took the place of an organ. The sound bore no resemblance to typical American country music. The instrument was capable of syncopated driving rhythms that took the praise session to elevated levels. The first documented use of a pedal (rather than lap) steel in this tradition was in 1952, but it did not become common until the early 1970s. This musical genre, known as "Sacred Steel" remained largely unknown outside the denomination until recordings and touring performers brought it to wider audiences during the 1990s. Robert Randolph subsequently became one of its most prominent exponents and received considerable critical attention in the early 2000s. Neil Strauss, writing in the New York Times, called Randolph "one of the most original and talented pedal steel guitarists of his generation." The Campbell Brothers are another American Sacred Steel gospel group from Rush, New York. The ensemble features pedal steel guitar by Chuck Campbell and began as the house band for a House of God Keith Dominion congregation.

== See also ==
- Steel guitar
- Lap steel guitar
- Slide guitar
- Console steel guitar
- Electric guitar
- Frying Pan (guitar)
- Resonator guitar
- Slack-key guitar
