= Sho-Bud =

Pedal steel guitar manufacturer

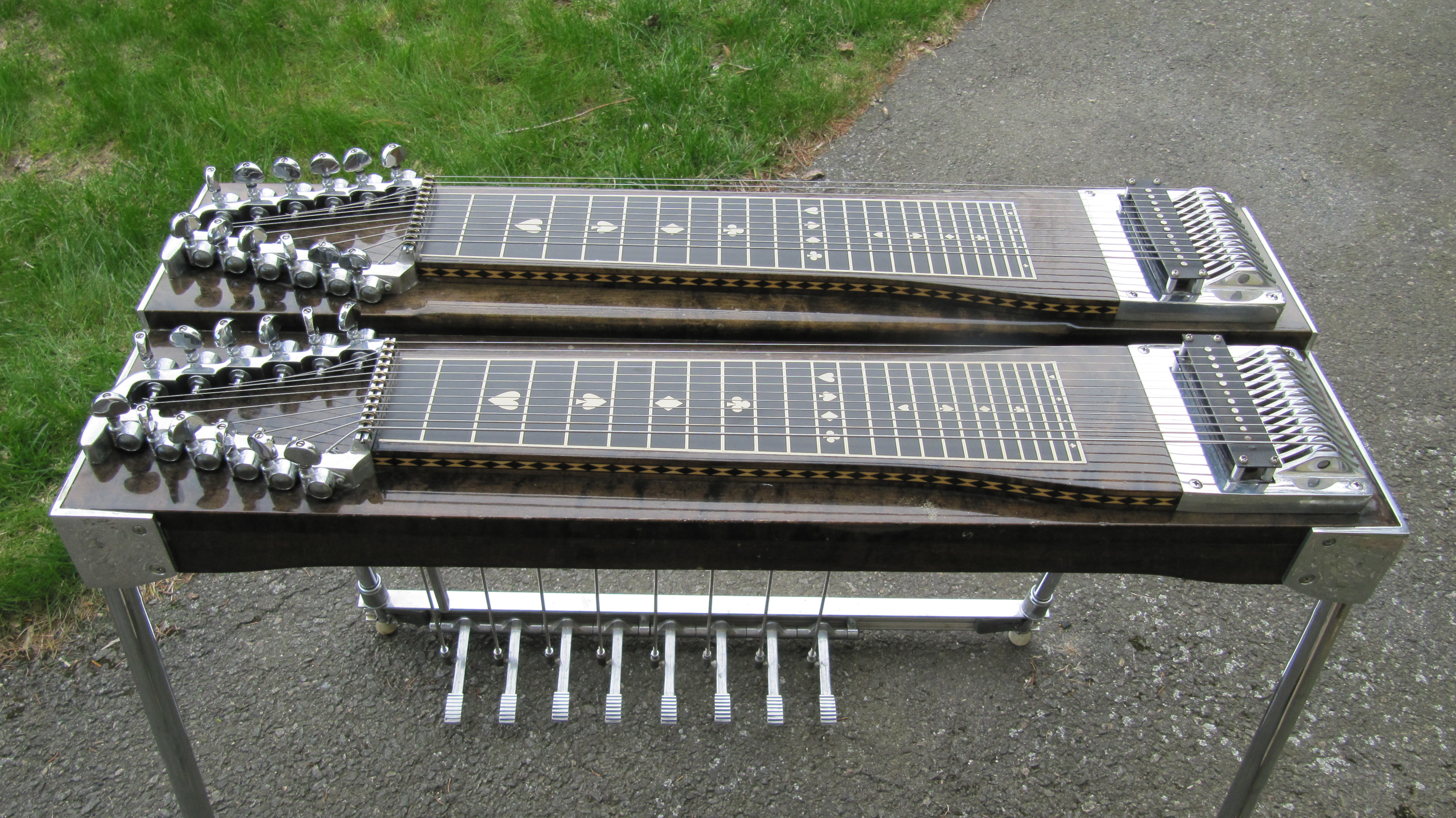
1979 Sho-Bud Double 12

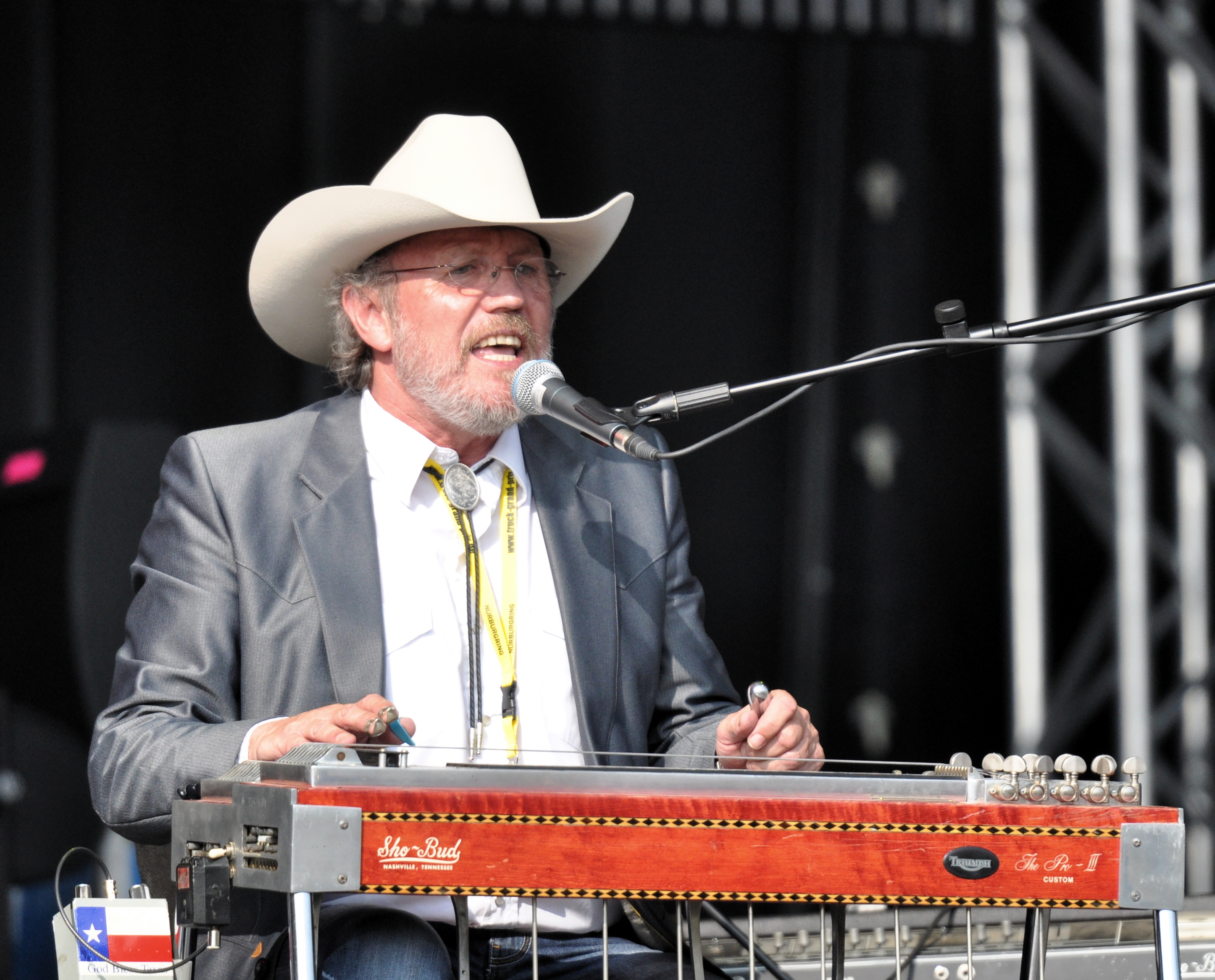
Country singer Hermann Lammers Meyer playing a Sho-Bud with the Emsland Hillbillies at the International Truck Grand Prix Country Festival 2013, Nürburgring, Germany

Sho-Bud is a brand name for a manufacturer of pedal steel guitars that was founded by Shot Jackson and Buddy Emmons in 1955 in Madison, Tennessee. Known for helping shape the "Nashville sound", Sho-Bud instruments became iconic in country and Americana music throughout the 1960s and 70s. After changing ownership in the 1980s and decades of dormancy, the brand was reacquired and relaunched by the Jackson family in 2024.

== History ==
In the early 1950s Shot installed string pullers with pedals on Fender, Rickenbacker, and other steel guitars. Shot approached steel guitarist Bud Isaacs to start the Sho-Bud company together, using the terms "Sho" named after Shot Jackson and "Bud" after Bud Isaacs. Bud Isaacs was an early partner in the endeavor, and was involved in designing the guitars but later left, after which Shot approached steel guitarist Buddy Emmons. In 1955 Buddy Emmons joined Shot and the two continued the endeavor to create the brand and company. (Note: "In 1955, Buddy Emmons, who played a Bigsby's pedal steel with Little Jimmy Dickens's Country Boys, Joined Shot Jackson to build the first Sho-Bud pedal guitar")

The brand was founded in a small garage in 1955 in Madison, Tennessee by Shot Jackson and Buddy Emmons, both active steel players in the 1950s. The company later relocated to Nashville, Tennessee in 1963.

Later in 1963, Buddy Emmons left Sho-Bud to start his Emmons Guitar Company with Ron Lashley, and Shot's sons, David and Harry, accompanied Shot in building Sho-Bud Steel Guitars. Duane Marrs then joined the company. David Shot was involved in designing the first "all pull" mechanics of the company's steel pedal guitars, which allowed for more musical flexibility.

In the 1970s they also expanded their line and offered acoustic guitars. They also made a line of dobro-style resonator guitars in conjunction with Gretsch under the name Sho-Bro, a play on the word "dobro". The name is currently owned by Gretsch, which purchased the company in 1979, and there are no models in production. In 2024, Shot Jackson's sons, David and Harry Jackson confirmed that Sho-Bud will start building steel guitars again.

== Relaunch ==
In December 2024, Sho-Bud was reacquired by the Jackson family, descendants of co-founder Shot Jackson. Siblings Dawn and Will Jackson, granddaughter and grandson of Shot Jackson, announced the relaunch of Sho-Bud with the goal of reviving its legacy and expanding its reach to a new generation of musicians. Prior to the relaunch, the family had continued building steel guitars under the Jackson Steel Guitar Company, working alongside their father, David Jackson, and uncle, Harry Jackson, both of whom had contributed to Sho-Bud’s design and production during the 1960s and 1970s. The relaunch marked Sho-Bud’s official return to commercial production after decades of dormancy. New models introduced included the Pro V, a traditional maple cabinet pedal steel; the SlideKing LS, a lap steel with modern design features; and the Maverick II, a reimagined version of Sho-Bud’s earlier entry-level instrument featuring an aluminum and maple body. The company also announced plans to reissue legacy models such as the LDG (Lloyd Green signature) and the Jimmy Day “Blue Darlin’.” In addition to its classic craftsmanship, Sho-Bud introduced several patented innovations, including a tunable vibrato system, Drop-D tuning mechanisms, a multi-string bending system known as the EDGE®, and proprietary Core-Over™ strings designed to enhance sustain and tonal clarity.

To celebrate the brand’s revival, Sho-Bud hosted a live showcase in Los Angeles in April 2025—the company’s first major public event in over 40 years. The showcase featured artists across multiple genres, including Slash, Robert Randolph, Andrea Whitt, Jeff "Skunk" Baxter, and Shooter Jennings.

In conjunction with the relaunch, the company also introduced Sho-Bud Music, a music label and publishing imprint, and announced the return of the Sho-Bud Showcase, a podcast blending digitized recordings from the original WSM radio program with new artist interviews.

== Pedal steel models ==
Models produced include the Permanent, Fingertip, Crossover, Maverick, Professional, Pro I, Pro II, Pro III, Super Pro and LDG (Lloyd Green). In addition to standard models, Sho-Bud also produced numerous custom instruments, including artist-specific and double-neck configurations.
