= E9 tuning =

Common tuning for steel guitar necks of more than six strings

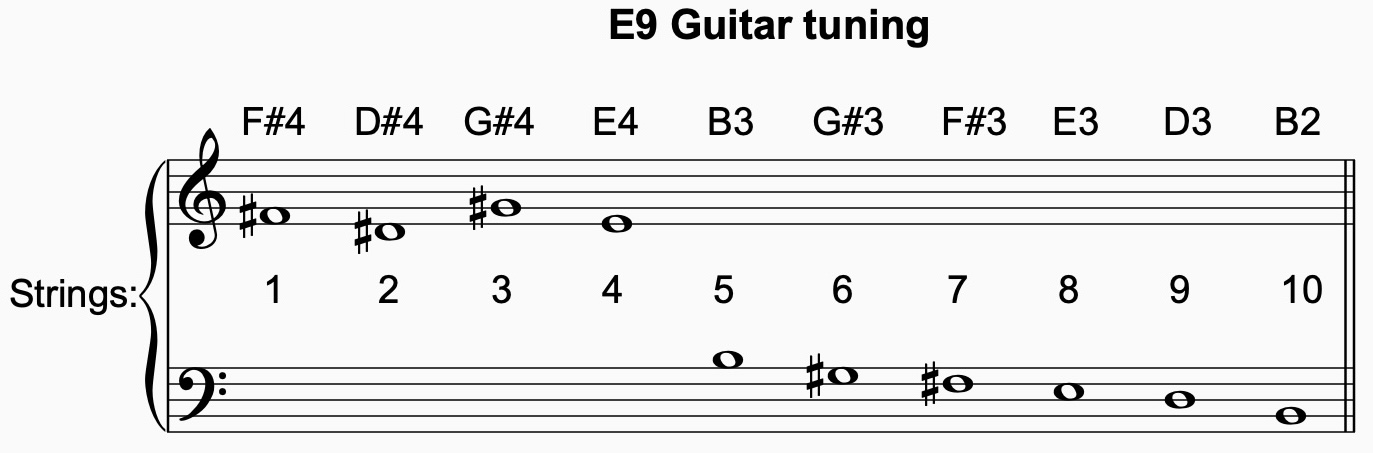
E9 chromatic tuning for steel guitar.

Ascending E9 tuning on ten string pedal steel

E9 tuning (also E9 chromatic tuning) is a common tuning for steel guitar necks of more than six strings. The name derives from the chord spelled by the tuning.

The practice evolved from 1950s–1970s through the work of musicians like Bud Isaacs, Ralph Mooney, and Buddy Emmons. It supports optimal chord and scale patterns across a single position on the 10-string pedal steel guitar.

== Practice ==
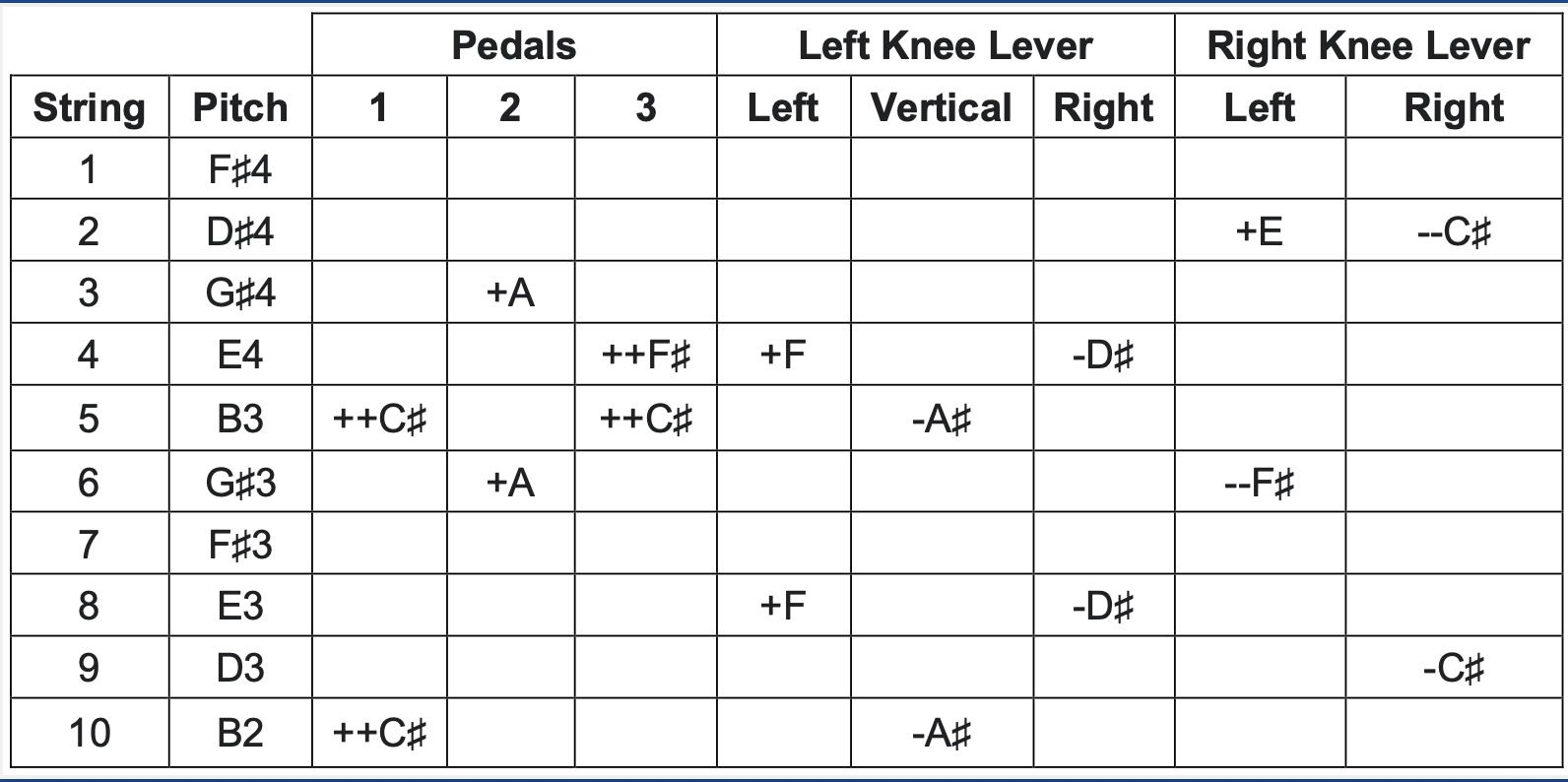
Buddy Emmons' E9 copedent.

The standard E9 chromatic tuning for ten string pedal steel guitar is F♯4-D♯4-G♯4-E4-B3-G♯3-F♯3-E3-D3-B2. In combination with the pedals and knee levers, it allows the performer to play a major scale without moving the steel bar.

E9 tuning is popular for single neck instruments of eight or more strings. On two-neck console and pedal steel guitars, E9 tuning is often used on one neck, and C6 tuning is used on the other. Typically, the C6 tuning is on the back neck, closest to the player.

The pedal and knee lever combinations used to play the instrument are known as a copedent. The pedals and levers need to be tuned as well as the guitar strings.

Standard copedent arrangements were devised by Buddy Emmons and Jimmy Day. Notes can be raised or lowered by half or whole steps, represented by plus and minus signs. Knee levers can be moved left, right, and vertically to change pitches.

== History ==
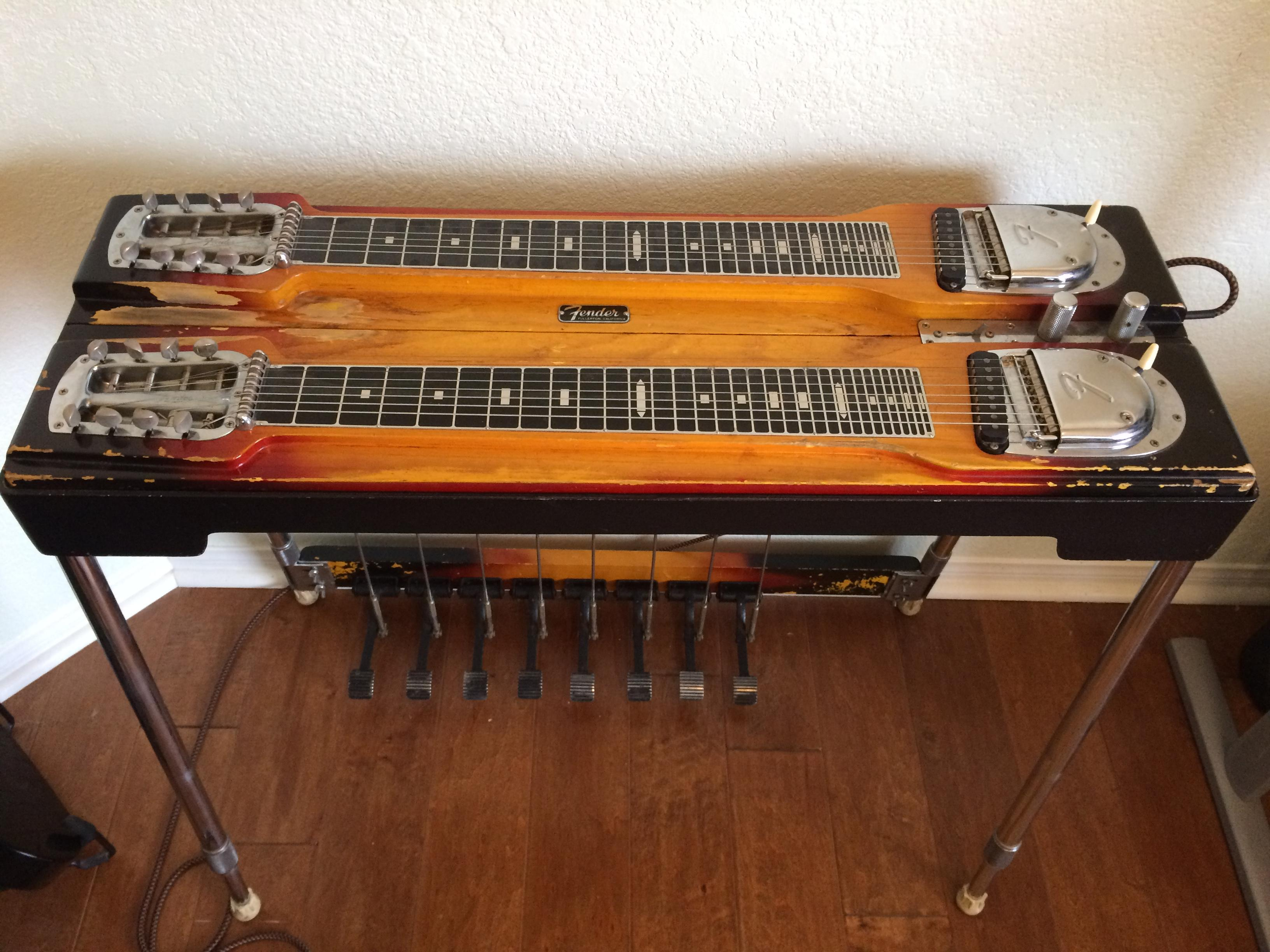
Fender 1000 pedal steel guitar with two necks.

E9 tuning was codified between the 1950s and 1970s during experimentation by elite steel guitarists. In the 1930s and 1940s, Manufacturers began adding necks and pedals to steel guitars. The design changes helped manufacturers target amateur musicians. They also enabled jazz players easier access to more sophisticated harmonies.

When Bud Isaacs began recording on a double-neck pedal steel on songs like Webb Pierce's "Slowly", other performers quickly emulated his style. The eight strings on the front neck of Isaac's guitar were tuned in a massive E ninth chord: E4-B3-G♯3-F♯3-D3-B2-G♯2-E2. Isaacs is sometimes credited with inventing E9 tuning.

In 1958, Jimmy Day inserted an E3 between the F♯3-D3 for a total of nine strings. The change was adopted by other players and became a permanent fixture in the E9 tuning. Ralph Mooney soon added a 10th string tuned to G♯4. In the 1960s, this 10-string tuning of G♯4-E4-B3-G♯3-F♯3-E3-D3-B2-G♯2-E2 was sometimes called Nashville E9 tuning.

E9 tuning was transformed once more by Buddy Emmons when he was trying to develop a sound of his own. In 1962, he added a D♯4 and F♯4 to the top of the instrument in order to easily play a scale. His configuration eliminated the lowest two notes of E9 tuning. Emmons' re-entrant tuning became the standard that is used today. It is often called "E9 chromatic tuning".
