= Steel Guitar Jazz =

Studio album by Buddy Emmons
- Released: September 1963
- Recorded: July 22, 1963
- Genre: Jazz
- Length: 36:20
- Label: Mercury
- Producer: Hal Mooney

Buddy Emmons chronology
Steel Guitar Jazz (1963)	The Steel Guitar and Dobro Sounds of Shot Jackson and Buddy Emmons (1965)

Steel Guitar Jazz is a 1963 studio album by steel guitarist Buddy Emmons. It was reissued in 2003 by Verve Records.

== Reception ==
Professional ratings
Review scores
Source	Rating
Allmusic	4.5/5 stars

Ken Dryden reviewed the album for Allmusic and wrote that "Buddy Emmons wasn't the first musician to be featured playing a pedal steel guitar in a jazz setting, but it is unlikely that anyone else recorded an entire date playing one prior to this 1963 session. He's surrounded by some top players...he also interacts with the band rather than overdoing the special effects available to him, especially the horn-like sounds obtained from his use of the slide. Emmons also chose an intriguing mix of material...This was pretty much a one-time affair for Emmons, who returned to country music, though he did record some additional jazz with guitarist Lenny Breau during the 1970s".

Kevin Whitehead reviewed the album in 2003 for National Public Radio's Fresh Air.

== Track listing ==
1. "Bluemmons" (Buddy Emmons) – 2:59
2. "Anytime" (Herbert "Happy" Lawson) – 2:47
3. "Where or When" (Lorenz Hart, Richard Rodgers) – 3:15
4. "(Back Home Again in) Indiana" (James F. Hanley, Ballard MacDonald) – 3:13
5. "Gravy Waltz" (Steve Allen, Ray Brown) – 3:58
6. "Oleo" (Sonny Rollins) – 3:11
7. "The Preacher" (Horace Silver) – 3:04
8. "Cherokee" (Ray Noble) – 3:56
9. "Witchcraft" (Cy Coleman, Carolyn Leigh) – 3:33
10. "Gonna Build a Mountain" (Leslie Bricusse, Anthony Newley) – 3:16
11. "There Will Never Be Another You" (Irving Gordon, Harry Warren) – 3:43

== Personnel ==
- Buddy Emmons - steel guitar
- Bobby Scott - piano
- Jerome Richardson - tenor saxophone, soprano saxophone
- Art Davis - double bass
- Charlie Persip - drums

Production

- Hollis King - art direction
- Sherniece Smith - art producer
- Ken Druker - executive producer
- Bob Irwin - mastering
- Hal Mooney - producer
- Bryan Koniarz - reissue producer
- Mark Cooper Smith - production assistant
