= Console steel guitar =

Musical instrument

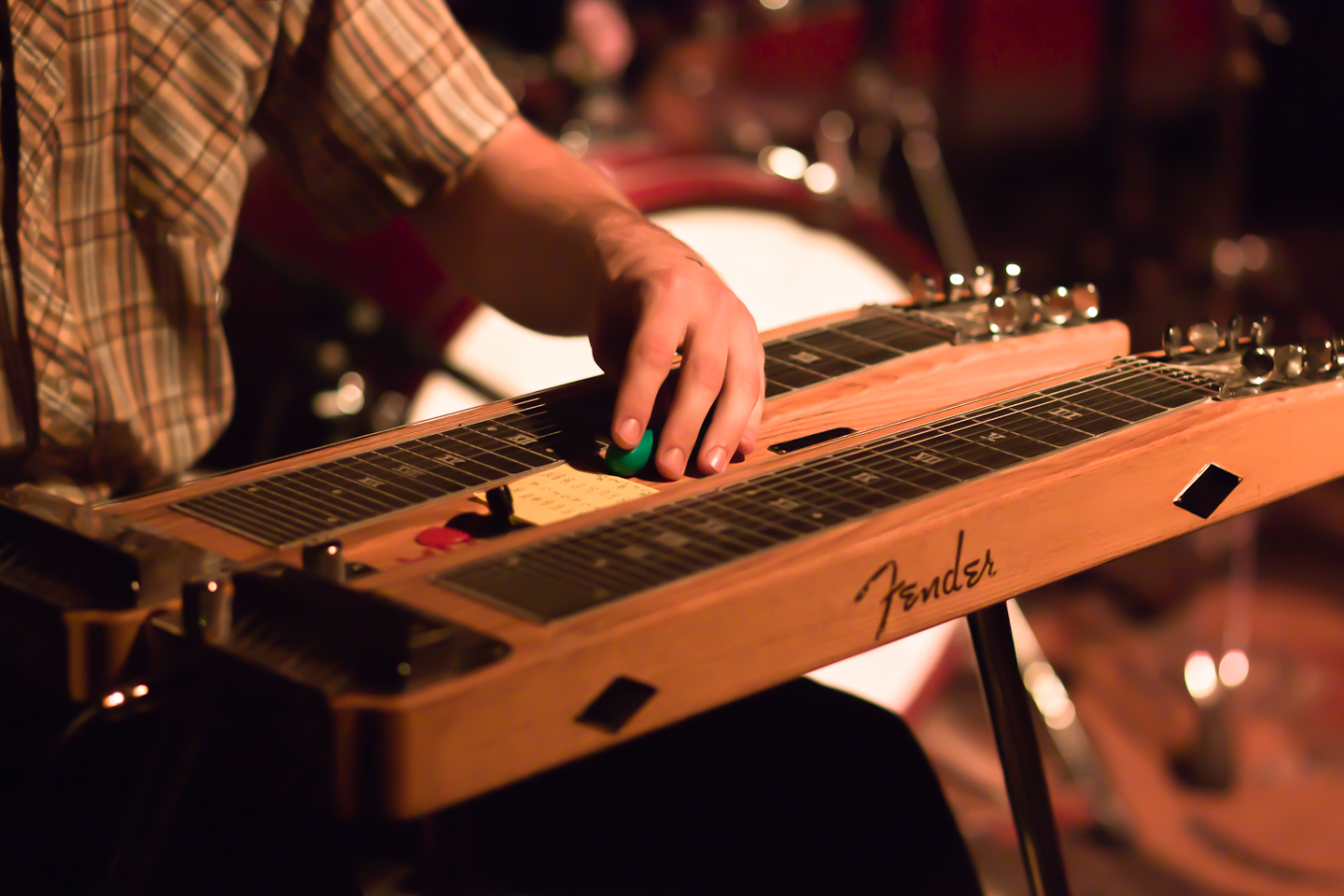
- Fender Dual 8 Professional Lap Steel (around 1952)
- Classification: String instrument

Related instruments
- Plucked string instrument

The console steel guitar is any type of electric steel guitar that is built in a frame supported by legs. It may be a lap steel or a pedal steel. Console steel guitars are typically heavier instruments that have multiple necks and/or more than six strings per neck and are therefore not manageable on the player's lap. This type of instrument was created when players in the late 1940s needed to play in different keys and with different chords than the lap steel afforded. To do this, they added additional necks (each tuned differently with additional strings) to a lap steel. The player could then easily switch to a different neck on the same instrument, but this made the instrument so heavy and cumbersome that it could not be easily held on the lap. Trying to solve the problem with multiple necks led to the invention of the pedal steel guitar in the 1950s.

Console steels are particularly favored in Hawaiian music, especially the twin neck eight string per neck configuration.

Console steel guitars most commonly have eight strings per neck, with six or seven strings less common and mainly on older instruments. Up to four necks is not unusual, as without the benefit of pedals, the player has only as many tunings available as there are necks, but two necks are most common. As with the pedal steel guitar, the neck closest to the player is most commonly C6 tuning, and the next closest E9 tuning.

Music Historian Andy Volk defines a lap steel as any non-pedal steel guitar that is played in a horizontal position (parallel to the floor) and this includes Hawaiian steel guitars, lap steels and table steels. There is a certain amount of disagreement about the preferred terms for non-pedal instruments.

Some makers and authorities do not use the term "console steel guitar" at all, but refer to any steel guitar without pedals as a "lap steel guitar". In 1956, Gibson was selling an 8+8 string with folding legs as a lap steel guitar, but this particular instrument is unplayable in lap steel fashion; The Fender Stringmaster with up to four necks was also described as a lap steel guitar in some Fender catalogs, while in others it was simply described as a steel guitar.

== Makers ==
- Aria
- Awtrey
- Fender
- George Boards
- Gibson
- Gretsch
- Epiphone
- Peavey
- Nova
- Remington
- Rickenbacker
- National

== See also ==
- Steel guitar
- Pedal steel guitar
