= Shot Jackson =

- Born: Harold Bradley Jackson; September 4, 1920; Wilmington, North Carolina, United States
- Origin: Nashville, Tennessee
- Died: January 24, 1991 (aged 70)
- Genres: Country music
- Instruments: Pedal steel guitar, dobro

Harold Bradley "Shot" Jackson (September 4, 1920-January 24, 1991) was an American country guitarist best known for playing Dobro and pedal steel guitar. He also designed and manufactured guitars under the name Sho-Bud.

== Biography ==
Jackson moved to Nashville in 1944 to play on the Grand Ole Opry, in Cousin Wilbur Westbrooks' band. After a short stint in the Navy, Jackson joined the Bailes Brothers on KWKH's Louisiana Hayride program, playing Dobro. After the Bailes Brothers left the Hayride, Jackson stayed behind, playing with artists like Webb Pierce, Jimmie Osborne, and Red Sovine. He met Johnnie & Jack, & Kitty Wells at KWKH as well as fiddler Paul Warren. Paul went with Lester Flatt & Earl Scruggs a couple of years before Jack Anglin Died in March 1963 of a car accident.

From 1949–62, Jackson joined Johnnie Wright and Jack Anglin's Tennessee Mountain Boys, as their Dobro player. During this time, he designed the first pedal steel guitar (modified Fender lap steel) and played behind Wright's wife Kitty Wells on early Decca recordings with a pedal steel, not the Dobro.

Jackson left the Tennessee Mountain Boys to play steel guitar for Roy Acuff's Smoky Mountain Boys. He designed a pedal steel guitar with Buddy Emmons, marketing it under the name Sho-Bud. Eventually Jackson left Acuff to devote more time to his burgeoning company, still finding time to play on records by Melba Montgomery whom was with Roy Acuffs' band, from 1960-1962. Including her hit duets with George Jones from 1962-1964. In 1962 Shot released a solo album, Singing Strings of Steel Guitar and Dobro, on Starday Records.

From 1964 until mid-1965, Jackson was back playing with Roy Acuff, but was badly injured (along with Acuff) in a serious head-on car crash that Acuff caused by passing without assured clear distance as they were late for a show. After he recovered, Jackson started performing with his wife, Donna Darlene. Around the same time, he began to market a new guitar—a seven-string resonator called the Sho-Bro.

Jackson was also responsible for introducing Willie Nelson to his favorite lifelong guitar, Trigger.

His professional playing after that became sporadic, but included two albums with Roy Clark. He sold Sho-Bud to Baldwin-Gretsch in 1980, selling his instrument repair business three years later. He was inducted into the Steel Guitar Hall of Fame in 1986. Not long after suffering a stroke (his second in less than ten years), he died on January 24, 1991.

== Discography ==
- Singing Strings of Steel Guitar and Dobro (1962, Starday)
- Bluegrass Dobro (1965, Cumberland)

== Sources ==
- Shot Jackson at AllMusic

Bear Family Records 1992 BCD15553
