= Steel bar =

Guitar accessory

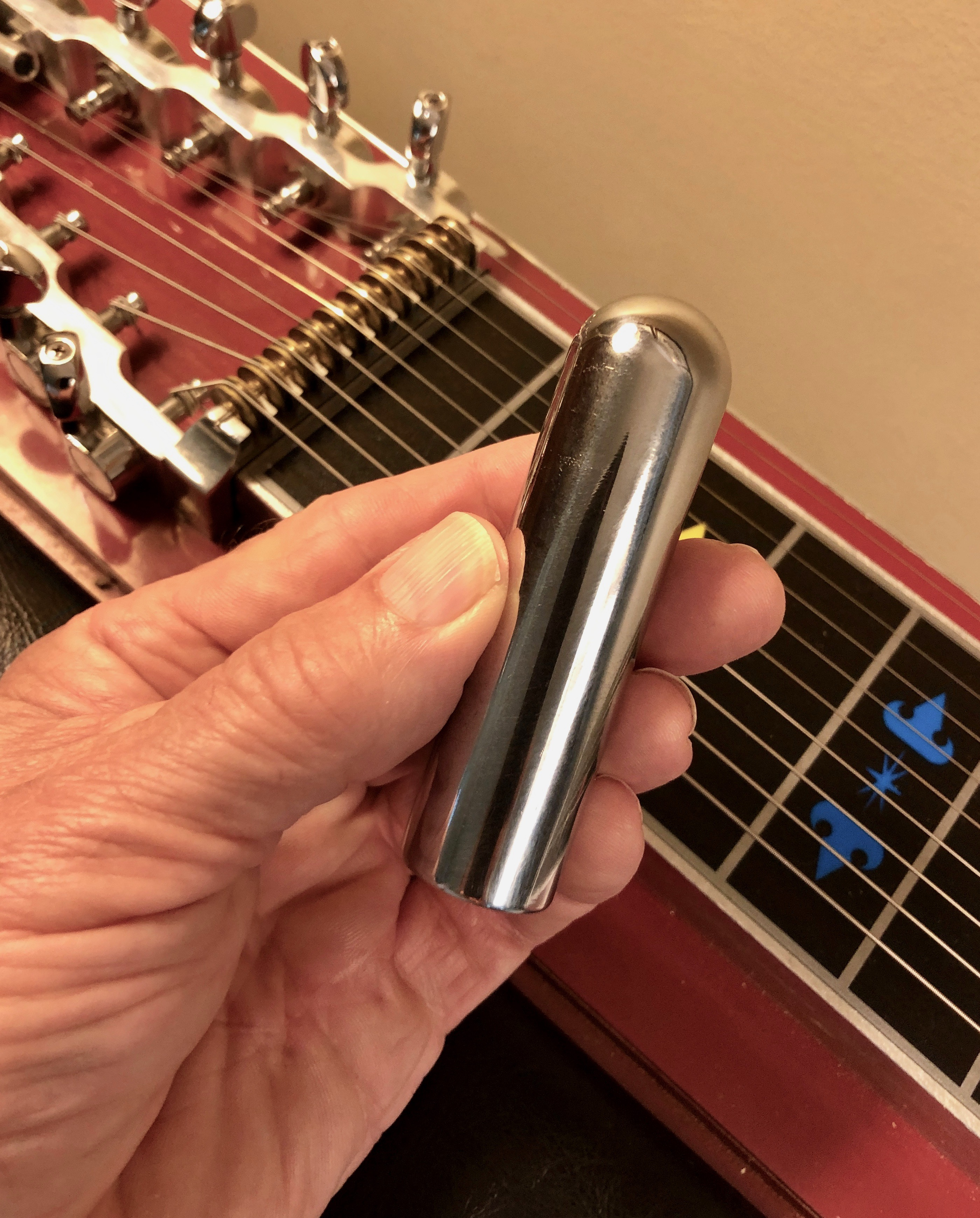
Steel bar (tonebar) used to play certain types of steel guitars

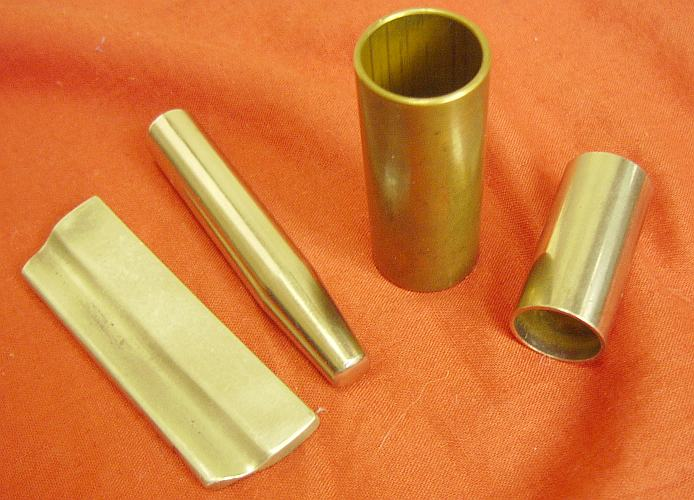
Several kinds of steel bars

A steel bar, commonly referred to as a "steel", but also referred to as a tone bar, slide bar, guitar slide, slide, or bottleneck, is a smooth hard object which is pressed against strings to play steel guitar and is itself the origin of the name "steel guitar". The device can either be a solid bar which is held in the hand, or a tubular object worn around the player's finger. Instead of pressing fingertips on the strings against frets as a traditional guitar is played, the steel guitarist uses one of these objects pressed against the strings with one hand, while plucking the strings with the other to gain the ability to play a smooth glissando and a deep vibrato not possible when playing with fingers on frets.

The solid bar is typically used when the instrument is played on the player's lap (across the knees) or otherwise supported in a horizontal position, historically called "Hawaiian-style". It is used in many genres of music, but commonly associated with American country music.

The tubular model is typically used in blues and rock music when the player holds the guitar in the traditional position (flat against the body). It is then called a "slide" and the style called "slide guitar". Early blues musicians inserted a finger in the sawed-off neck of a bottle to use as a slide and the term "bottleneck" became an eponym for this type of blues guitar playing.
