= C6 tuning =

Common tuning for electric steel guitar

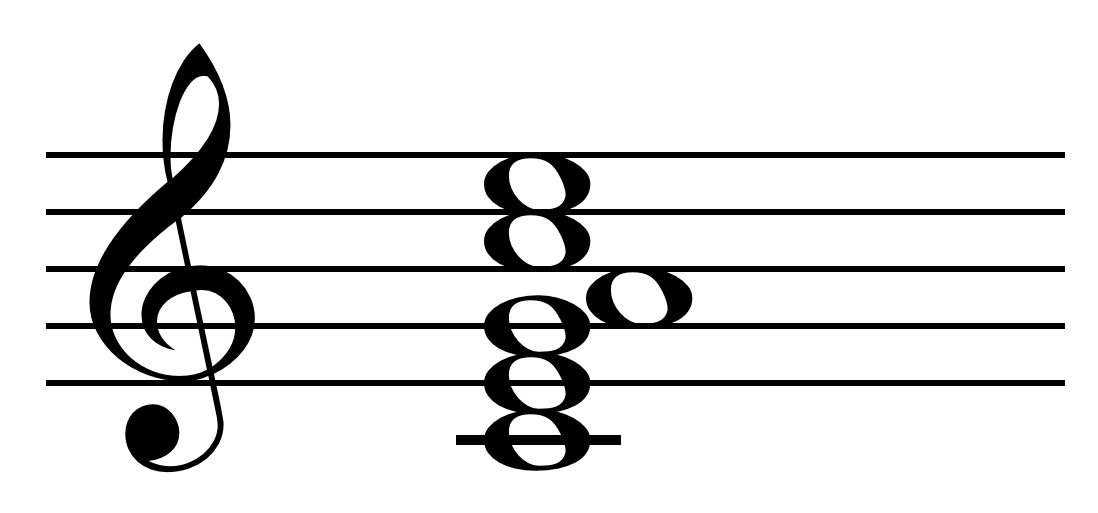
C6 tuning for six strings, notated an octave higher than it sounds.

C6 tuning is one of the most common tunings for steel guitar, both on single and multiple neck instruments. On a twin-neck guitar, the most common set-up is C6 tuning on the near neck and E9 tuning on the far neck.

== History ==
In the 1930s, steel guitar had a limited vocabulary due to its open tuning in a single chord. Players began adding a seventh to the bottom of the range. Jerry Byrd realized that by adding a sixth scale degree, he had even more flexibility. By 1937, Byrd was devising an arrangement based around a C major sixth chord. The tuning allowed easy access to nearly any chord through pedals and slant positions. Byrd claimed C6 tuning as his invention, but so have other players. Regardless, Byrd indisputably was the one who popularized C6 tuning.

C6 tuning remains closely associated with Western swing and jazz, and E9 tuning is more endemic to Nashville country music. C6 tuning is sometimes called "Texas" tuning.

== Practice ==
On six-string guitars, the basic C6 tuning is E4-C4-A3-G3-E3-C3..

On a console steel guitar with eight strings, C6 tuning often runs G4-E4-C4-A3-G3-E3-C3-A2.

Pedal steel guitar usually features ten strings. A C6 tuning arrangement for ten strings often runs G4-E4-C4-A3-G3-E3-C3-A2-F2-C2. The top string is often D4 instead of G4, which creates a reentrant tuning.
