= Jimmy Day =

American musician; steel guitarist (1934–1999)

- Day in c. 1975

Background information
- Also known as: Jimmy Day
- Born: James Clayton Day; January 9, 1934; Tuscaloosa, Alabama, U.S.
- Died: January 22, 1999 (aged 65) Austin, Texas
- Genres: Country; Western swing
- Occupation: Musician
- Instruments: Lap steel guitar; pedal steel guitar
- Years active: 1950–1992
- Labels: Abbott Records and others

Jimmy Day (born James Clayton Day; January 9, 1934 – January 22, 1999) was an American steel guitarist active in the 1950s and 1960s. His career in country music blossomed about the time the pedal steel guitar was invented—after pedals were added to the lap steel guitar. He was a pioneer on pedal steel in the genres of Western swing and Honky tonk and his modifications of the instrument's design have become a standard on the modern pedal steel. Day's first job after high school was performing on the Louisiana Hayride as a sideman accompanying developing country artists including Hank Williams, Webb Pierce, Willie Nelson, Jim Reeves, Ray Price and Elvis Presley. He recorded and toured with all these artists and was featured on hit records by many of them, including Ray Price's, "Crazy Arms" and "Heartaches by the Number". He was a member of Elvis Presley's band for about a year, but, along with fellow bandmate Floyd Cramer, resigned after Presley requested them to re-locate to Hollywood. Day moved to Nashville to work as a session player and a Grand Ole Opry musician. He was a member of the Western Swing Hall of Fame (1994) and the International Steel Guitar Hall of Fame (1999). Day died of cancer in 1999.

== Early life ==
Day was born in Tuscaloosa, Alabama, but grew up in Louisiana. A lean and lanky country boy, he began playing a traditional guitar, but was influenced by a steel guitar performance on local television by Shot Jackson. He decided then with certainty that he wanted to master the steel guitar. He received a six-string lap steel as a Christmas present in 1949. Just after high school graduation in 1951, he auditioned for and was granted a job in the house band on the "Louisiana Hayride", a popular country music radio show which at the time rivaled Nashville's Grand Ole Opry. The show has a weekly broadcast on KWKH from Shreveport. One of Day's junior high classmates also got a job there, the future hall-of-fame pianist Floyd Cramer.

== Career ==
On the radio broadcast, Day gained experience in backing performers who were on their way to becoming megastars, including Hank Williams, Faron Young, Johnny Horton, Jim Reeves and Elvis Presley . His first recording session (at age 18) was Webb Pierce's song, "That Heart Belongs to Me" in 1952. He played in Ernest Tubb's "Texas Troubadors" and also Jim Reeves' band, the "Blue Boys". He recorded several songs with Reeves, and had two instrumentals of his own, "Rippin' Out" and "Blue Wind". In the spring of 1952, Day performed with Hank Williams for a six month term. After Williams' death, Day overdubbed some of Williams' posthumous releases.

Day moved to Nashville in 1955 and became a session player, performing on classic hits such as "Crazy Arms" and "Heartaches by the Number" (Ray Price) and "Pick Me Up on Your Way Down"(Charlie Walker). While in Price's band, the "Cherokee Cowboys", Day formed a friendship with the band's bass player, Willie Nelson. When Nelson himself had a hit record called "Touch Me", he resigned from Price's band in 1962 to go solo; and took Day with him. After about six months, Day left Nelson to perform with various artists including Ferlin Husky, Buddy Emmons, and Little Jimmy Dickens. Day released a solo album, Steel and Strings in 1963. His nickname for his pedal steel guitar was "Blue Darlin'".

Day began transitioning from lap steel to the new and more versatile pedal steel guitar about 1954, while performing with Lefty Frizzell. One of his last lap steel performances was a Louisiana Hayride show in 1955 backing Elvis Presley. Presley assembled a band consisting of Day, Cramer, Scotty Moore, Bill Black, and D.J. Fontana. This group remained his supporting band for much of the year; however, when Presley relocated to Hollywood, both Day and Cramer declined to follow him there, preferring to remain in Nashville to pursue independent careers.

In the late 1950s, Day formed a business partnership with Buddy Emmons and Shot Jackson in the Sho-Bud Company. The company designed and manufactured the first pedal steel guitars with push-rod pedals. Up to then, individuals were trying to retro-fit pedals to add to existing lap steel guitars; Sho-Bud was one of the first companies to manufacture pedal steels de novo.

== Contributions to the E9 pedal steel ==
Day is credited (along with Buddy Emmons), with splitting a single pedal on a pedal steel guitar which changed the pitch two strings simultaneously; he made it into two separate pedals, one for each of the strings. Emmons had the same idea, but the two men reversed the strings affected by each pedal. This led guitar manufacturers to ask whether the customer wanted a "Day" setup or an "Emmons" setup. Both Day and Emmons changed the instrument from 8 to 10 strings. Day added a new E string (a duplicate of the tonic note) at the 8th string position in 1958. This change has become a standard on the modern instrument.

== Personal life ==
In the 1970s, Day left Nashville to move to Texas to live in Buda, a commuter town south of Austin. He became active in the Texas music scene, working with Price, Nelson and Johnny Bush; he ventured back to Nashville only occasionally. He created an album saluting Don Helms and in 1992 paid tribute to another guitarist, Western swing artist Herb Remington, with whom Day recorded an instrumental duet album.

According to former bandmate Johnny Bush in his 2017 book, Whiskey River (Take My Mind): The True Story of Texas Honky-Tonk, Day was a "first-call" session player and the "master of the E9 sound" on country ballads, but had issues with substance abuse which allowed Pete Drake to take over Day's session work. In the book, Bush said Day quit drinking in the last twenty years before he died, but his health had suffered because of it. Bush had known Day since they performed together in Ray Price's "Cherokee Cowboys".

Day died of cancer in 1999 and is buried in Austin. He was inducted into the International Steel Guitar Hall of Fame in 1982. . He was also a member of the Western Swing Hall of Fame (1994).
