= Buddy Emmons =

American pedal steel guitarist (1937–2015)

Background information
- Born: Buddy Gene Emmons; January 27, 1937; Mishawaka, Indiana, U.S.
- Died: July 21, 2015 (aged 78) Nashville, Tennessee
- Genres: Country, jazz
- Occupation: Musician
- Instruments: Pedal steel guitar, lap steel guitar
- Years active: 1952–2015
- Labels: Mercury, Flying Fish
- Formerly of: Little Jimmy Dickens, Ray Price, Ernest Tubb, John Hartford, The Everly Brothers

Buddy Gene Emmons (January 27, 1937 – July 21, 2015) was an American musician who is widely regarded as the world's foremost pedal steel guitarist of his day. He was inducted into the Steel Guitar Hall of Fame in 1981. Affectionately known by the nickname "Big E", Emmons' primary genre was American country music, but he also performed jazz and Western swing. He recorded with Linda Ronstadt, Gram Parsons, The Everly Brothers, The Carpenters, Jackie DeShannon, Roger Miller, Ernest Tubb, John Hartford, Little Jimmy Dickens, Ray Price, Judy Collins, George Strait, John Sebastian, and Ray Charles and was a widely sought session musician in Nashville and Los Angeles.

Emmons made significant innovations to the steel guitar, adding two additional strings and an additional pedal, changes which have been adopted as standard in the modern-day instrument. His name is on a US patent for a mechanism to raise and lower the pitch of a string on a steel guitar and return to the original pitch without going out of tune. He won the Academy of Country Music's "Best Steel Guitarist" nine times, beginning in 1969.

Anytime
Emmons Steel Guitar Jazz

In 2013, two years before his death, he was honored by the Country Music Hall of Fame in a tribute called "The Big E: Salute to Buddy Emmons" featuring testimonials and performances by eminent musicians and hall of fame members.

== Early life ==
Emmons was born in Mishawaka, Indiana. When he was eleven years old, his father bought him a lap steel guitar and arranged for lessons at the Hawaiian Conservatory of Music in South Bend, Indiana, which he attended for about a year. He then began figuring out how to play the country music that he heard on the radio. He has said that Jerry Byrd and Herb Remington were among his first musical influences. By age fifteen, his playing had progressed considerably. In those teenage years, he started spelling his first name "Buddie" just because he wanted to have six letters each of his first and last names. This was only a temporary whim, but his name may appear in published sources spelled that way, including the song title "Buddie's Boogie". His parents bought him a triple-neck Fender Stringmaster steel guitar, and he began performing with local bands in South Bend.

Bored with high school, he left at age sixteen and moved with a childhood friend to Calumet City, Illinois, where he was hired by Stony Calhoun to play in his band. He moved to Detroit to play with Casey Clark. While he was with Clark, he bought a Bigsby steel guitar with pedals similar to the pedal steel guitar that Bud Isaacs had used on the Webb Pierce song "Slowly". (The pedals on a pedal steel guitar allow the player to change the pitch of one or more strings while playing the instrument. A separate volume pedal is also used, compensating for the attack and decay of the strings for a smooth, constant or creative near-constant volume.)

The next year, Little Jimmy Dickens heard Emmons playing with Casey Clark and offered him a job with his band, so at the age of 18, in July, 1955, Emmons moved to Nashville. Dickens's band was then a popular act in country music, with complex arrangements and fast twin guitar harmonies. Dickens arranged for his band to record several instrumentals on Columbia Records under the name The Country Boys. The first tunes recorded included three of Emmons's originals, two of which, "Raising the Dickens" and "Buddie's Boogie", became steel-guitar standards.

In 1956, Dickens dissolved his band to perform as a solo act. Emmons began doing recording sessions in Nashville. One of his first studio sessions resulted in Faron Young's hit version of "Sweet Dreams".

== Contributions to design of the steel guitar ==
In late 1956, Emmons contributed to the evolution of the pedal steel guitar by splitting the function of the two pedals that changed the pitch of certain strings from a tonic chord to a subdominant chord. This "split-pedal" setup is now the standard pedal arrangement in the E9 tuning, since it allows greater musical flexibility than the earlier pedal setup pioneered by Bud Isaacs. Emmons recalls that he first used this split-pedal innovation on Ernest Tubb's "Half a Mind (to Leave You)". Emmons' name is on a US patent for a mechanism to raise and lower the pitch of a string on a steel guitar and return to the original pitch without going out of tune. Prior to his invention, the problem of a string going out of tune after stretching to raise pitch, and loosening to lower the pitch had been a vexing problem in the design of the instrument. Emmons and Shot Jackson formed the Sho-Bud ("SHOt-BUDdy") Company to design and build pedal steel guitars in 1956. In 1962, Emmons added two additional strings to the upper register of the E9 neck of the pedal steel guitar.

== Career ==
In 1957, Emmons (by then nicknamed the "Big E" for both his 6-foot height and musical prowess) joined Ernest Tubb's Texas Troubadours. His first recording with Tubb, "Half a Mind (to Leave You)", became a hit record. In 1958, Emmons quit Tubb's band and moved to California. Eight months later, he returned to Nashville and rejoined the Texas Troubadours as the lead guitar player for the next five months, at which point he returned to the pedal steel guitar chair in the band. In 1962, he left Tubb to join Ray Price and the Cherokee Cowboys, replacing his long-time friend, steel-guitarist Jimmy Day. His first recording with Price in September, 1962, produced the hit song, "You Took Her Off My Hands". On this song Emmons used another of his major steel guitar innovations, adding two "chromatic" strings (F# and D#) to the E9 tuning. These "chromatic strings" have since become part of the standard 10-string pedal steel guitar tuning.

Price soon appointed Emmons to be his bandleader, and Emmons created many of the arrangements on Price's recordings over the next several years. In early 1963 Price recorded Willie Nelson's song, "Night Life" as the title cut of his forthcoming album. Emmons' bluesy pedal steel intro and solo bridges on the song are now considered among the most innovative and iconic sounds in country music lore. After trying without success to get Shot Jackson interested in his new guitar design ideas, Emmons left Sho-Bud in 1963 and formed the Emmons Guitar Company.

Emmons continued to record and tour with Price until 1967 and, between tours with Price, did recording session work with many Nashville artists such as George Jones and Melba Montgomery. Emmons left the Cherokee Cowboys largely due to his disenchantment with Price's growing interest in performing pop-style country with string orchestrations.

Meanwhile, Emmons' long-time friend, songwriter Roger Miller, offered him a job in his band in California. Emmons moved to Los Angeles, playing bass in Roger Miller's band and doing studio work on pedal steel.

Emmons returned with Peggy to Nashville in 1974, where he quickly resumed studio work with artists such as Mel Tillis, Donna Fargo, Duane Eddy and Charlie Walker. Beginning in 1974, Emmons became a regularly featured performer at the annual International Steel Guitar Convention in St. Louis, and was inducted into the Steel Guitar Hall of Fame in 1981.

In 1976, Emmons recorded a highly regarded tribute to the great Western Swing artist Bob Wills, on which he sang lead vocal and played steel guitar. He continued to do session work throughout the 1980s and 1990s with artists such as John Hartford, George Strait, Gene Watson, John Anderson, and Ricky Skaggs.

In 1977, Emmons teamed with Danny Gatton for occasional gigs, and then in 1978 they toured as the band Redneck Jazz Explosion. On New Year's Eve 1978, they recorded the album Redneck Jazz Explosion (which wasn't released until 1995) live at The Cellar Door in Washington, D.C.

Also in 1977, he played steel guitar and resonator/dobro on Christian singer Don Francisco's album Forgiven. This album was recorded in Nashville.

In 1990, Emmons and Ray Pennington formed the Swing Shift Band and began producing a series of CDs that included big band swing, Western swing, and original country songs. Emmons began touring with The Everly Brothers in 1991, which continued until about 2001. He discontinued regular session work around 1998 to tour with The Everlys.

== Personal life ==
Emmons' son, Larry, from his first marriage, later became a professional musician, playing bass with Ernest Tubb. According to a 1965 interview, Emmons and his second wife, Gigi "have two children, Buddie Gene and Tami." In 1967, he married his third wife, Peggy, who brought twin girls, Debbie and Diana, from her first marriage.

About 2001, Emmons began suffering from a repetitive motion injury to his right thumb and wrist, which caused him to stop playing for over a year. He did not to return to regular recording session work, but did record with some artists he had known for many years, such as Ray Price, Johnny Bush, and Willie Nelson. He continued to perform at steel guitar shows and on American Public Media's A Prairie Home Companion until his death. He struggled with alcohol and amphetamine dependency and credited his wife Peggy for aiding his recovery.

Emmons has three granddaughters, Crystal, Nikia, (who died in 2004) and Brittany, and two grandsons, Levon and Buddie III. Emmons' wife Peggy often accompanied him to steel guitar shows and conventions, and helped Buddy meet fans and sell recordings and videos. She died on December 19, 2007. Emmons died of a heart attack in Nashville, Tennessee on July 21, 2015.

== Selected discography ==
- Steel Guitar Jazz, (Mercury, 1963)
- Steel Guitar, (Flying Fish, 1975)
- Buddy Emmons Sings Bob Wills (Flying Fish, 1976)
- Buddies (Flying Fish, 1977)
- Forgiven Don Francisco, 1977, playing the steel guitar.
- Minors Aloud, with Lenny Breau (Flying Fish, 1979)
- Christmas Sounds of the Steel Guitar (Step One, 1987)
- Swingin' from the 40s Thru the 80s with Ray Pennington (Step One, 1989)
- Swingin' by Request with Ray Pennington (Step One, 1992)
