= Resonator mandolin =

Type of instrument

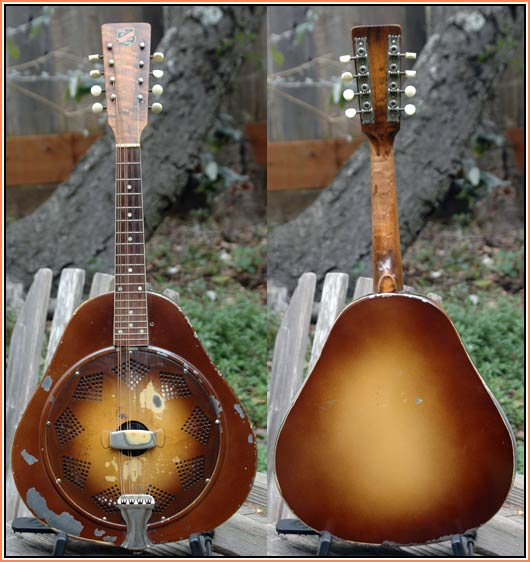
1930 National Triolian resonator mandolin from Lowell Levinger's collection

A resonator mandolin or "resophonic mandolin" is a mandolin whose sound is produced by one or more metal cones (resonators) instead of the customary wooden soundboard (mandolin top/face). These instruments are sometimes referred to as "Dobro mandolins," after pioneering instruments designed and produced by the Dopyera Brothers, which evolved into a brand name. The trademark "Dobro" is currently the property of the Gibson Guitar Corporation. When Gibson acquired the trademark in 1993, they announced that they would defend their right to its exclusive use.

The resonator mandolin was developed in parallel with the resonator guitar. The resonator guitar was originally designed to be louder than conventional acoustic guitars. A resonator mandolin is generally somewhat louder than a standard wooden mandolin, and has a different tone quality and distinctive appearance.

Though resonator guitars are often played flat in the lap steel guitar style, resonator mandolins are almost exclusively played in the conventional manner.

== History ==
=== National String Instrument Corporation ===
The resonator mandolin was developed by John Dopyera, who sought to produce a guitar that would have sufficient volume to be heard alongside brass and reed instruments. In 1927, Dopyera and George D. Beauchamp formed the National String Instrument Corporation to manufacture resonator guitars under the brand name National, adding tenor guitars, resonator mandolins and resonator ukuleles to their product line within a year.

National mandolins were produced until 1941. The company also made resophonic mandolins sold under the Supro brand.

=== Dobro ===
In 1929, Dopyera left National to form the Dobro Manufacturing Company with his brothers Rudy, Emile, Robert and Louis, Dobro being a contraction of "Dopyera Brothers" and coincidentally meaning "good" in their native Slovak language. This company primarily produced guitars, but also produced resonator mandolins and resonator ukuleles that employed a cone-and-spider resonator rather different from the one- and three-cone components of the Nationals. Dobro Manufacturing Company licensed designs and supplied trademarks and parts to a series of vendors such as Kay-Kraft, Harmony (Sears) and Regal. George D. Beauchamp retained control of the National String Instrument Corporation. The two companies clashed in court from 1931 until 1935, when the Dopyeras prevailed and the National-Dobro Corporation was formed. The company moved to Chicago in 1936–37.

Mandolins sold under the Dobro brand had wooden bodies. Mandolins sold under the National brand had metal bodies. Production of all metal-bodied resonator instruments ceased following the US entry into the Second World War in 1941.

Rudy Dopyera in particular continued to build instruments on his own throughout his lifetime, into the 1980s. He produced a few resophonic mandolins under the Safari brand name.

== Variations ==
=== Fake resophonic mandolins ===
Some inexpensive mandolins sold during the 1930s and 1940s had a wooden top with a resonator cover plate screwed to it. These instruments had no resonator cone, nor did they have a hole cut for one. The cover plate served only as a decoration.

=== Blue Comet "resonator" mandolins ===
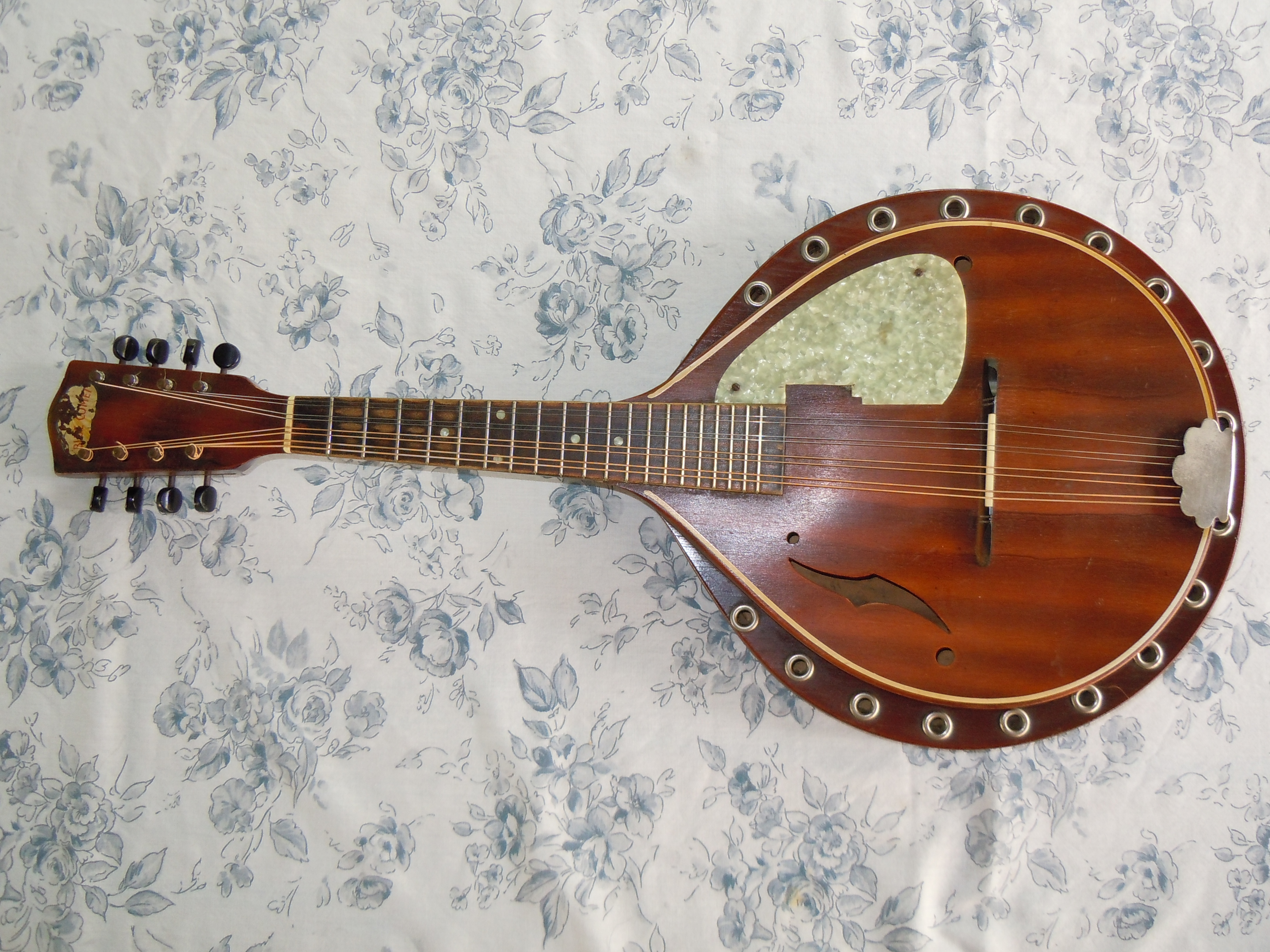
Blue Comet mandolin. This one was manufactured by the Regal Musical Instrument Company.

Blue Comet is an inexpensive 1930s brand of mandolin manufactured by the Regal Musical Instrument Company in Chicago, Il that featured an extra wooden sound chamber encircling the body. Somewhat resembling a banjo tone ring, this chamber contained several small soundholes with metal screen covers. While the sound chamber may indeed affect the tone or volume of the mandolin, Blue Comets do not contain resonator cones and are not truly resophonic. They are usually dark brown with F holes. Similar mandolins were sold under the Beltone brand and a couple of other brand names.

=== Reso-electric ===
Although the original aim of the resonator was increased volume, some modern instruments incorporate electric pickups, and players add pickups to non-electric instruments, and use the resonator purely for its distinctive tone.

In 1938 and 1939, National made a limited number of "Silvo" electrics using the same triangular metal body as the Style 1 resophonic mandolin. The Silvo pickup was housed in a bakelite disc that replaced the cover plate. However, since Silvos do not have a resonator cone, they are electric but not truly resolectric.

== Manufacturers ==
- Dobro
- National
- National Reso-Phonic
- Regal
- Beltona
- Rigel Instruments
- Commodium
- James Curtis
- Del Vecchio
- Donmo
- Fine Resophonic
- Patrick Arbuthnot (Chanticleer)
- Dave King
- Bill Little
- John Morton
- Glenn Nelson
- Ron Oates
- Phillips
- Republic Guitars
- Kurt Schoen
- Tut Taylor
- Wailing Guitars
- Pete Woodman Guitars

== Players ==
- Bert Deivert
- Sam Bush
- Rich DelGrosso
- Ry Cooder
- John Kruth
- David Grisman
- Win Butler
- Steve James

== See also ==
- Mandolin
- Resonator guitar
- Resonator ukulele
