= Del Rey (musician) =

- Born: Leilani Kurnik; December 22, 1959 (age 66); Los Angeles, California, U.S.
- Genres: Blues
- Occupation: Singer
- Instruments: Guitar, ukulele, vocals
- Years active: 1985–present
- Labels: Kicking Mule, Hobemian
- Website: www.delreyplays.com

Del Rey (born December 22, 1959) is an American blues singer and guitarist. Rey specializes in blues and jazz from 1900 to 1950. She developed a Women in American Music concert/lecture series to provide an historical and cultural look at the contribution of women to music in the early 20th century. She is recognized for her syncopated style of guitar and intricate finger picking.

== Early life ==
Rey grew up with her mother, Eileen, and father, Stan. They lived a bohemian life, moving frequently, until settling down in San Diego, California. Rey became interested in the guitar when her mother bought one in 1964. She was just four years old. Her father bought a second, smaller guitar, and Rey and her mother would follow along to Frederick Noad's guitar lessons on PBS in their trailer park's rec room where there was a television. Rey told a reporter, "I like to tell people that I approach music with an autodidact trailer-park aesthetic". By the age of seven, Rey performed in a talent show.

In her early teens, Rey frequented a local music shop called "Folk Arts Rare Records" owned by Lou Curtiss, mentor to Tom Waits. It was through Curtiss she met Sam Chatmon, performing with him onstage. Her other influences included Bo Carter and Memphis Minnie.

Rey gravitated toward 1900 to 1920s ragtime and 1920 to 1950s blues when, she said, music had "more regional accents" and was not so "commodified and mass-marketed". A fan of Memphis Minnie, Rey described her as someone who did not fit into a stereotypical cultural myth. She played "killer guitar" and was "a woman performer who was at her best in middle age and who chewed tobacco".

Rey attended college in Santa Cruz, but dropped out to pursue her career in music.

== Career ==
By 1980, Rey was performing in Santa Cruz with Bob Brozman. Tired of being drowned out by his resonator guitar, she purchased a '38 National Style O. She played the National until meeting Ron Phillips, a luthier, who custom made her a resonator guitar.

In 1991, Rey met Steve James in Santa Cruz, California. Later becoming a couple, they started performing together at a Port Townsend Country Blues workshop in 2001. In the same year, Rey released a cassette-only recording "Chartreuse".

By 1993, Rey had her own label, Hobemian Records, and released Boogie Mysterioso, followed by Hot Sauce in 1995. Her music was a blend of country blues, stride piano, classic jazz, hillbilly boogie and Tin Pan Alley.

In 2003, Rey released Del Rey: Live, a collection of performances and followed up with Tonight, a 15-track album with James. This 2004 release received European and Asian distribution.

In 2004, Rey started performing with the Yes Yes Boys. She played a Phillips resonator ukulele, an instrument she started playing at the urging of her friend and fellow musician, Sandy Hines. She describes her playing as a mix of Piedmont and upper Mississippi styles.

As her skills on the ukulele developed, Rey began giving workshops and lessons at festivals. In describing her experience with the ukulele, Rey said, "All the different kinds of experiences - whether it's a sad song or a dance piece or something funny or insightful - it's all there. You just have to digging and not go, 'Oh well, I can't play that because I don't have another string.' There are no excuses. It's all there".

Rey has gone on to produce multiple solo and collaborative albums, including X-Rey Guitar (2000), When the Levee Breaks (2006), Blue Uke (2008), and Solo Del Rey (2016)

Rey tours worldwide and also writes about music for Acoustic Guitar magazine and other publications.

== Women in American Music ==
Rey developed a lecture series called Women in American Music, featuring female musicians such as Memphis Minnie, Lovie Austin, Rose Maddox, and Mary Osborne. The series, which she calls her "Memphis ministry," is an historical and cultural look at contributions of women to the music of the 1900-1950s. The academic program includes blues, swing jazz, Hispanic and hillbilly music.

In 1997, with a commission from the Guitar Festival in Dubendorf, Switzerland, she created a touring art exhibit called Women with Guitar. The exhibit includes historical photos and archival film footage from the early 20th century of influential women pioneers in the early jazz, country, and blues movements such as Sister Rosetta Tharpe, Memphis Minnie, Maybelle Carter, Lydia Mendoza and others.

"Being female, I have an idea of what it is to be a subgroup, where people have preconceptions of what you should and should not do. So I think that these programs, and my own music, show the reach of what women can do and have accomplished. We have a place in history that can no longer be denied". — Del Rey

== Discography ==
- Cafe Society (1985) - Kicking Mule
- Chartreuse (1991) - Hobemian Records
- Boogie Mysterioso (1993) - Hobemian Records
- Hot Sauce (1995) - Hobemian Records
- X-Rey Guitar (2000) - Hobemian Records
- Twins (2002) with Steve James - Hobemian Records
- Snap Shot (2003) - Hobemian Records
- Tonight (2004) with Steve James - Hobemian Records
- Steve James + Del Rey (2004) - Hobemian Records
- When The Levee Breaks (2006) - Hobemian Records
- At the Ukeshack #1 (2007) with Matt Weiner - Hobemian Records
- Blue Uke: At The Ukeshack #2 (2008) - Hobemian Records
- Hen Party (2010) with Suzy Thompson - Hobemian Records
- Four and Six (2012) - Hobemian Records
- Artwalk (2014) - Hobemian Records
- Rocket Red and Ruby Chard (2014) with Adam Franklin - Hobemian Records
- Solo (2017) - Hobemian Records
- Communique (2017) with Suzy Thompson - Hobemian Records

=== Instructional DVD ===
- Boogie Woogie Guitar (2005) - Homespun
- Blue Uke (2007) - Homespun
- Blues Guitar Styles of Memphis Minnie - Homespun
- Memphis Uke Party - Homespun

=== Other appearances ===
- A Musical Doorway (2000) Produced by Seattle Folklore Society
- Why Say No? (2003) The Yes Yes Boys featuring Del Rey
- Things About Comin' My Way: A Tribute to the Music of the Mississippi Sheiks (2009)
