= Resonator ukulele =

Resonator Ukulele
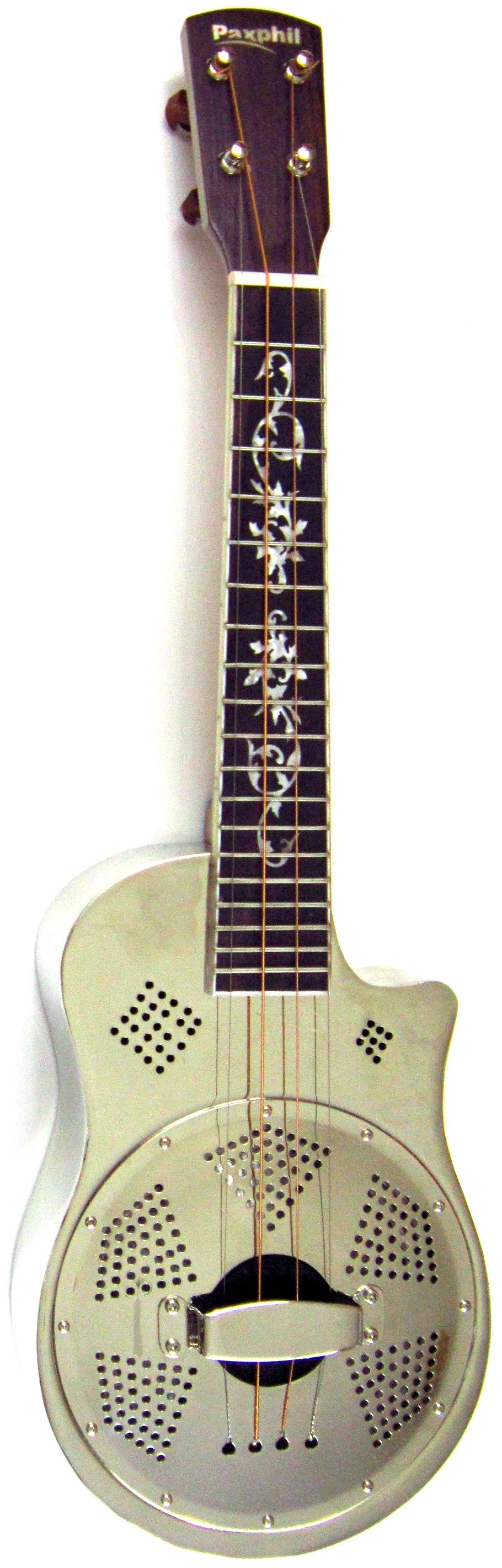
- Resonator ukulele by Phillip Phillips
- Classification: String instrument (plucked)
- Hornbostel–Sachs classification: 321.322 (plucked)

Related instruments
- Resonator guitar; Ukulele

Musicians
- Bob Brozman; Del Rey

Builders
- Dobro; Del Vecchio; National; National Reso-Phonic

A resonator ukulele or "resophonic ukulele" is a ukulele whose sound is produced by one or more spun aluminum cones (resonators) instead of the wooden soundboard (ukulele top/face). These instruments are sometimes referred to as "Dobro ukuleles," however the term "Dobro" is currently trademarked by the Gibson Guitar Corporation.

The resonator ukulele is a descendant of the resonator guitar. The resonator guitar was originally designed to be louder than conventional acoustic guitars, which were overwhelmed by horns and percussion instruments in dance orchestras. A resonator ukulele is generally somewhat louder than a standard wooden ukulele, and has a different tone quality and distinctive appearance.

Though resonator guitars are often played flat in the lap steel guitar style, resonator ukuleles are almost exclusively played in the conventional manner.

== History ==
=== National String Instrument Corporation ===
The resonator guitar was developed by John Dopyera, seeking to produce a guitar that would have sufficient volume to be heard alongside brass and reed instruments. In 1927, Dopyera and Beauchamp formed the National String Instrument Corporation to manufacture resonator guitars under the brand name National, adding resonator mandolins and ukuleles to their product line within the first year.

=== Dobro ===
In 1929, Dopyera left National to form the Dobro Manufacturing Company with his brothers Rudy, Emile, Robert and Louis, Dobro being a contraction of "Dopyera Brothers" and coincidentally meaning "good" in their native Slovak language. This company primarily produced guitars, but also produced resonator mandolins and resonator ukuleles that employed a cone-and-spider resonator rather different than the one- and three-cone components of the Nationals. Dobro Manufacturing Company licensed designs and supplied trademarks and parts to a series of vendors such as Kay-Kraft, Harmony (Sears) and Regal. George D. Beauchamp retained control of the National String Instrument Corporation. The two companies clashed in court from 1931 until 1935, when the Dopyeras prevailed and the National-Dobro Corporation was formed. The company moved to Chicago in 1936-37. Production of all metal-bodied resonator instruments ceased following the US entry into the Second World War in 1941.

Some of the Dopyera brothers returned to making resonator guitars in 1967, but resonator ukuleles were not included in the new product line.

=== National Reso-Phonic Guitars ===
In the late 1980s, the National brand and trademark reappeared with the formation of National Reso-Phonic Guitars in San Luis Obispo, California. The company began producing National-type resonator instruments, eventually adding resonator ukuleles to their product line. In 2007, they discontinued production of soprano scale ukuleles, focusing their production on concert scale ukuleles.

== Playing ==
Resonator ukuleles are an uncommon instrument, and not as intimately tied to particular styles of music as the resonator guitar. In some cases, the resonator ukulele is used in the same contexts which would call for the use of a resonator guitar (particularly blues music), as a cultural parallel.

=== Styles and positions ===
The resonator ukulele is almost exclusively played in the standard guitar position. One of the few major players who is an exception to this rule is James Hill, who commissioned a specialized square-neck, high-action resonator ukulele from Beltona for the express purpose of playing in the lap style. The standard ukulele tuning (gCEA) is the most common option, with a small minority using open tunings.

Most resonator ukuleles are strung with nylon, nylgut and fluorocarbon strings, although a minority of luthiers build reso-ukuleles designed to be used with steel strings.

=== Varieties of resonator ukuleles ===
==== Sizes ====
Pre-World War II resonator ukuleles were of the soprano or concert sizes, and those sizes are still the most common type constructed today. Tenor resonator ukuleles are produced, but are less common, while baritone resonator ukuleles are a rare custom item.

==== Construction ====
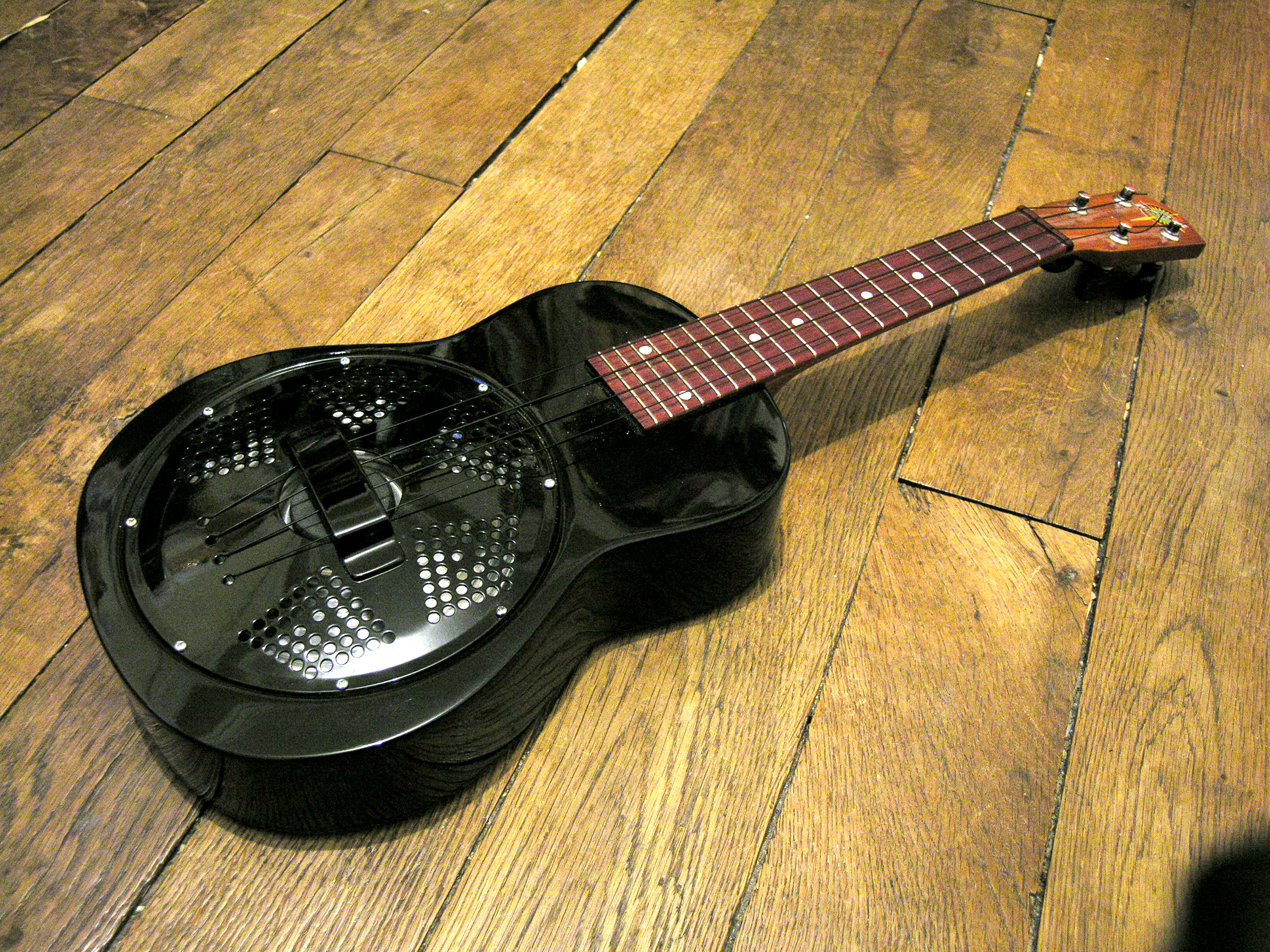
Fiberglass-body reso-uke by Beltona

Resonator ukuleles generally utilize a "National style" single-resonator biscuit cone, although a small number (including those made by the Dobro company in the 1930s) use a bowl resonator and spider cone. Tricone resonators, such as seen in many National resonator guitars and mandolins, are not generally used. Note that the term "Triolian" which National applied to some models of resonator ukuleles does not indicate that said instruments used a tricone resonator.

Since the majority of the instrument's tone is produced by the resonator rather than the body, resonator ukuleles may have bodies made of metal, fiberglass, or wood (solid or ply). Metal bodies may be brass, aluminum or steel. Both metal and wooden bodies are often painted, or wooden bodies may be stained or lacquered. Metal bodies may be plated or plain, and are sometimes engraved. Several makers also offer metal-bodied reso-ukuleles with an artificially aged or rusted surface.

Resonator instruments may have round sound holes with screens or cut f-holes at the top of the face, or a hole cut into the side of the body angling up towards the player's face, through which the sound of the instrument issues.

=== Reso-Electric ===
Although the original aim of the resonator was increased volume, some modern instruments incorporate electric pickups, and players add pickups to non-electric instruments, and use the resonator purely for its distinctive tone.

== Manufacturers ==
- Beltona
- Del Vecchio
- Dobro
- Mya-Moe Ukuleles
- National
- National Reso-Phonic
- Regal
- Johnson/Ashbury
- Pete Howlett
- Beeton
- Donmo
- Fine Resophonic
- Mélopée
- Colin Oldham
- Stuart Wailing
- Koki'o / Risa
- Big Rusty
- Duane Heilman / Black Bear
- Geoff Davis / Old Crow
- Gretsch
- John Morton
- Kala
- R.E. Phillips
- Pohaku Ukulele
- Republic Guitars
- Wailua Instruments

== Players ==
Prominent professional players of resonator ukuleles include:

- Bob Brozman
- Del Rey

== See also ==
- Ukulele
- Banjolele
- Lap steel ukulele
- Resonator guitar
