= Regal Musical Instrument Company =

US company

- Type: Private (1896–1954); Brand (1954–present)
- Industry: Musical instruments
- Founded: 1896 in Indianapolis
- Founder: Emil Wulschner
- Defunct: 1954; 72 years ago
- Fate: Company defunct in 1954, brand acquired by Harmony, then owned by other companies
- Headquarters: Chicago, United States
- Area served: United States
- Products: Resonator guitars, mandolins and ukuleles
- Owner: Saga Musical Instruments (1987–present)

The Regal Musical Instrument Company is a former US musical instruments company and current brand owned by Saga Musical Instruments. Regal was one of the largest manufacturers in the 1930s and became known for a wide range of resonator stringed instruments, including guitars, mandolins, and ukuleles. Only resonator guitars are sold under the Regal brand today, with manufacturing in Korea and distribution in San Francisco, United States.

== History ==
Emil Wulschner, a retailer of Indianapolis, opened his first music instruments factory –"Emil Wulschner & Son" in 1896 to build guitars and mandolins. Products were sold under three brand names: Regal, University, and 20th Century. Wulschner died in 1900, and the new owners renamed the company the "Regal Musical Instrument Manufacturing Company" in 1901 and continued using the Regal name on instruments through 1904.

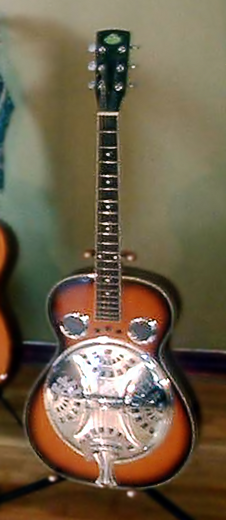
Regal resonator guitar

In 1904, Lyon & Healy purchased rights to the brand Regal. Four years later, the company officially re-introduced the Regal name in Chicago, establishing their factory there. Lyon & Healy set Regal up as an independent company in 1924.

During its first years of existence, Regal only marketed 4-string instruments such as ukuleles and tenor guitars. The production of 6-string guitars would begin later. The Regal brand was heavily involved in the production of resonator fretted instruments from their first development until 1941, manufacturing components and bodies for both the National and the Dobro companies (Dobro acquiring National in 1934), though the Dopyera brothers still produced the resonator cones for them. The bodies of their laminated bellied guitars were particularly suited to resonator conversion.

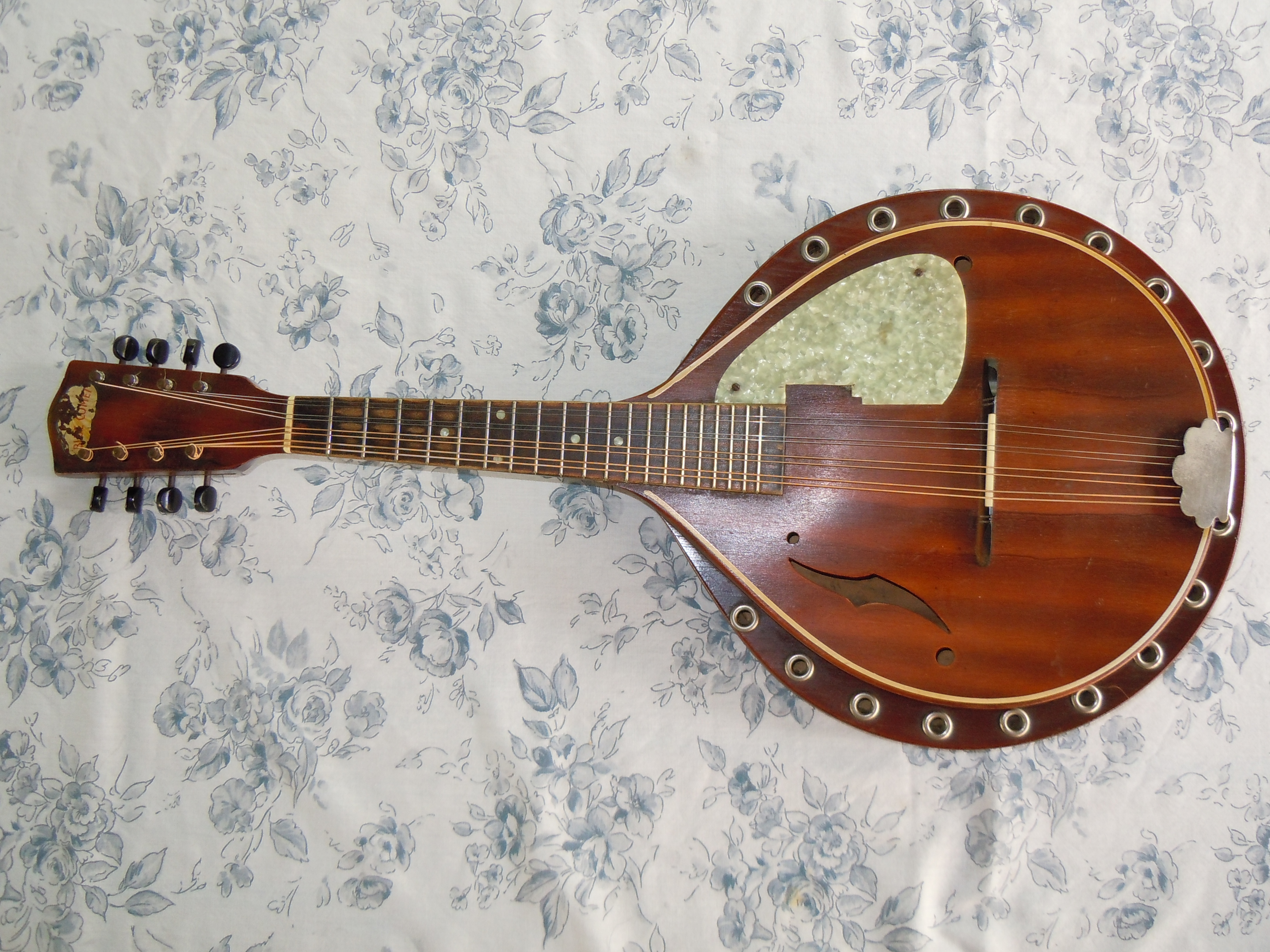
Regal made a line of mandolins for Perlberg & Halpin of New York to brand Blue Comet

In the early 1930s, Regal had licensed the use of Dobro resonators. When National moved from California to Chicago, Regal acquired the rights to manufacture Dobro instruments. That made Regal become another producer of "house brand" guitars before World War II.

Production of resonator guitars ceased in 1941, followed by all fretted instruments in 1954. That same year, Regal closed down as a company, and its rights to the name and assets were sold to the Harmony Company. Harmony owned Regal for a brief period so Fender took over the brand in the late 1950s. In 1965, Fender distributed five models of banjo under the Regal name, as the "exclusive distributors". It is not clear when Fender ceased to commercialise Regal products.

In an effort to reintroduce the brand to global markets and focusing on overseas production sources, Saga Musical Instruments acquired the Regal name in 1987 and has steadily produced a complete line of metal and wood body resophonic instruments.

== Brand owners ==
- Emil Wulschner & Son (1896–1904)
- Lyon & Healy (1904–1954)
- Harmony Company (1954–late 1950s)
- Fender (1950s–?)
- Saga Musical Instruments (1987–present)
