= Lap steel ukulele =

Lap Steel Ukulele
- Classification: String instrument (plucked)

Related instruments
- ukulele, guitar

The lap steel ukulele is a type of and method of playing the ukulele.

There are three main types of lap steel ukulele:

- Lap slide ukuleles, simply a ukulele with high action played with a slide.
- Resonator ukuleles, particularly those with square necks..
- Electric lap steel ukuleles, generally solid-body instruments.

Lap slide and resonator ukuleles may also be fitted with pickups, but do not depend on electrical amplification to produce their sound.

== Description ==
The distinguishing feature of a lap steel ukulele is that the strings are raised at both the nut and bridge ends of the fingerboard. This makes the frets unusable, and they may be replaced by markers on some ukuleles. Other lap steel ukuleles are designed to be adapted between lap and conventional playing, or are modified versions of conventional ukuleles, and the only difference may be the action height. Round-necked resonator ukuleles set up for steel playing fall into this category. Ukuleles which are made exclusively for slide playing may have a "square" profile neck.

Lap steel ukuleles generally have four strings, in keeping with their ukulele heritage.

== Playing ==
The lap steel ukulele is typically placed on the player's lap, or on a surface in front of the seated player.

The strings are not pressed to a fret when sounding a note, rather, the player holds a metal slide called a steel in the left hand, which is moved along the strings to change the instrument's pitch while the right hand plucks or picks the strings.

This method of playing greatly restricts the number of chords available, so lap steel music often features a restricted set of harmonies (such as in blues). Alternatively, the lap steel ukulele player can play the melody or another single part.

== History ==
The lap steel ukulele appears to be a very recent development, with only a handful of professional musicians and large-scale manufacturers addressing the style and instrument.

Ukulele musician James Hill commissioned a square-neck raised action resonator ukulele from Beltona Resonator Instruments in order to develop his lap steel ukulele style. Similarly, Indian slide guitarist Debashish Bhattacharya designed a four-string lap steel guitar, or "slide ukulele" which he calls the anandi.

=== Notable lap steel ukulele players ===
- James Hill
- Debashish Bhattacharya
- Del Rey

== Tunings ==
The lap steel ukulele may be tuned to the standard ukulele tuning, or to an open tuning.

== See also ==
- Lap steel guitar
- Resonator ukulele
- Electric ukulele
- Ukulele
