= Paul McGill =

Paul McGill may refer to:

- Paul McGill (luthier), American luthier
- Paul McGill (actor), American actor, choreographer and director
