= Hound dog =

Hound dog or Hound Dog may refer to:

- Hound, a type of dog that assists hunters by tracking or chasing prey

== Music ==
- "Hound Dog" (song), a 1952 song recorded by Big Mama Thornton and popularized in 1956 by Elvis Presley
- Hound Dog (band), a 1980s Japanese rock band
- Hound Dog Taylor (1915–1975), American blues guitarist
- Hound Dog, a brand of guitars of the Original Musical Instrument Company

== Other uses ==
- Hounddog (film), a 2007 dramatic film starring Dakota Fanning
- AGM-28 Hound Dog, a US Air Force missile
- Hounddog McBrag, a character in Ninjago
- Hound Dog, a brand of lawn tools of Ames True Temper
