= Beltona =

Beltona may refer to:

- Beltona Records, a British record label founded in 1923
- Beltona Resonator Instruments, a British manufacturer of resonator guitars and resonator ukuleles founded in 1990
