= Super Ace =

Super Ace may refer to:

- Pober Super Ace, a single-seat sport kitplane
- Chrislea Super Ace, a four-seat light plane
- Tata Super Ace, a 1-ton mini truck
- Super Ace, a nylon-stringed electric guitar designed by Paul McGill
