= Steve James (blues musician) =

American folk blues musician (1950–2023)

- Born: July 15, 1950; Manhattan, New York, U.S.
- Died: January 6, 2023 (aged 72) Seattle, Washington
- Genres: Folk blues, acoustic blues, contemporary blues
- Occupations: Singer, musician, songwriter
- Instruments: Vocals, guitar, mandolin
- Years active: Late 1970s-2022
- Label: Various

Steve James (born July 15, 1950 – January 6, 2023) was an American folk blues musician.A multi-instrumentalist, singer, and songwriter, James operated in the fields of acoustic and folk blues. Without the benefit of promotion from a major record label, James had secured his fan base from consistent touring.

== Biography ==
James was born on July 15, 1950, in Manhattan, New York City, in the United States. He played a National steel guitar, mandolin, and the banjo, having become fixated, as an adolescent, on blues music. As a teenager in New York City, James listened to his father's record collection, which included recordings from Lead Belly, Josh White, and Meade "Lux" Lewis. Following relocation to Tennessee, he met both Sam McGee and Furry Lewis. In 1977, he moved to San Antonio, Texas, and played along with various musicians including Bo Diddley, John P. Hammond and Dave Van Ronk.

James' earliest recordings were Two Track Mind (1993), American Primitive (1994), and Art & Grit (1996). Bob Brozman played some slide guitar on Art & Grit, and Danny Barnes has appeared on a number of James' recordings.

In 2000, the Portland, Oregon based, Burnside Records label, issued Boom Chang. Three years later Burnside released, Fast Texas, where James was accompanied by Cindy Cashdollar on steel and dobro guitars; plus Ruthie Foster and Cyd Cassone on vocals. James' own songs appeared on Fast Texas, as well as covers of work from Hop Wilson, Milton Brown, and Little Hat Jones. Cashdollar and Alvin Youngblood Hart had previously guested on Boom Chang.

James' playing also appeared on recordings from James McMurtry and Ana Egge. He has released an instructional video and contributed to Acoustic Guitar. He continued to tour around the world and incorporated teaching sessions on guitar playing techniques.

He died at home in Seattle, Washington, on January 6, 2023, from a brain tumor.

== Discography ==
- Two Track Mind (1993) - Discovery
- American Primitive (1994) - Antone's
- Art & Grit (1996) - Texas Music Group
- Not for Highway Use: Austin Sessions 1988-1995 (2000) - Settlement
- Boom Chang (2000) - Burnside Distribution
- Fast Texas (2003) - Burnside Distribution
- Tonight (2004) - Artist One-Stop
- Steve James + Del Rey (2004) - Hobemian Records
- Short Blue Stories (2009) - Hobemian Records
- Steve James Live, Vol. I, Austin TX and Berkeley CA (2016) - Hobemian Records HB0020
- Steve James, Blues and Folk Songs, Volume 1 (2018) - Hobemian Records HB0023
