= National Reso-Phonic Guitars =

American musical instrument manufacturer

- Type: Private
- Industry: Musical instruments
- Founded: 1989; 37 years ago
- Founder: Don Young; McGregor Gaines
- Headquarters: San Luis Obispo, California, United States
- Area served: Worldwide
- Products: Resonator acoustic, electric and tenor guitars, resonator mandolins, resonator ukuleles
- Owner: Jason Workman
- Website: nationalguitars.com

National Reso-Phonic Guitars is a manufacturer of high quality resonator guitars and other resonator instruments.

== History ==
The company was formed in 1989 by Don Young and McGregor Gaines in a Southern California garage. They began producing resonator guitars under the name "National Reso-Phonic Guitars".

Since 1990, the factory has been located in San Luis Obispo, California. It currently produces over 300 instruments annually, offering more than 50 different models including Scheerhorn guitars. The company also repairs and restores vintage National instruments.

National Reso-Phonic Guitars, Inc. is currently owned by President/Owner Jason Workman.

== Products ==
National Reso-Phonic Guitars model range include the Tricone, biscuit-bridge, and the inverted cone design used on the Dobro.
