= Tenor guitar =

Four-stringed guitar

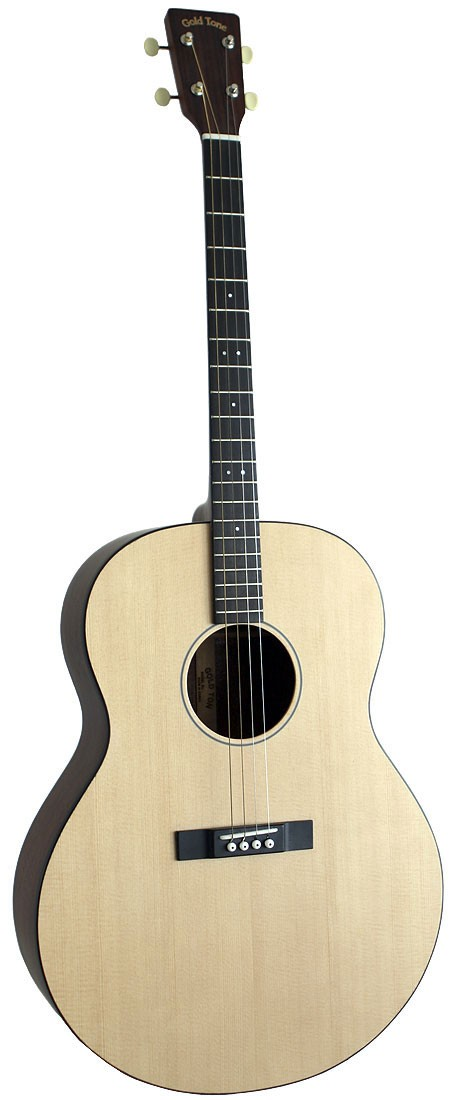
- Modern tenor guitar manufactured by the Gold Tone Music Group

String instrument
- Other names: Four-string guitar
- Classification: String instrument (plucked, stringed instrument usually played with a plectrum)
- Hornbostel–Sachs classification: 321.322-4 (Composite chordophone)
- Developed: c. 1927

Related instruments
- guitar; mandola; mandolin; tenor banjo; ukulele

The tenor guitar or four-string guitar is a slightly smaller, four-string relative of the steel-string acoustic guitar or electric guitar. The instrument was initially developed in its acoustic form by Gibson and C.F. Martin so that players of the four-string tenor banjo could double on guitar.

== Construction ==
Tenor guitars are four-stringed instruments normally made in the shape of a guitar. They can be acoustic, electric, or both and they can come in the form of flat top or archtop wood-bodied, metal-bodied resonator, or solid-bodied instruments. Tenor guitars normally have a scale length similar to that of the tenor banjo and octave mandolin of between 21 and 23 inches (53 and 58 cm).

== History and development ==
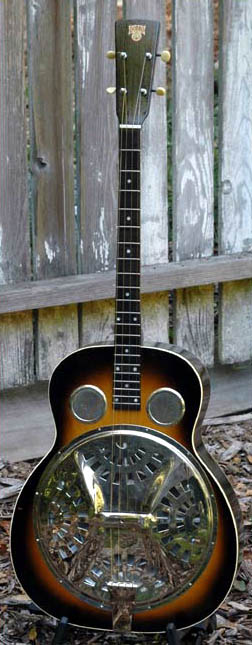
1928 Dobro–style 37 tenor guitar

The earliest origins of the tenor guitar are not clear, but it seems unlikely that a true four-stringed guitar-shaped tenor guitar appeared before the late 1920s. Gibson built the tenor lute TL-4 in 1924, which had a lute-like pear-shaped body, four strings and a tenor banjo neck. It is possible that similar instruments were made by other makers such as Lyon and Healy and banjo makers, such as Bacon. In the same period, banjo makers, such as Paramount, built transitional round banjo-like wood-bodied instruments with four strings and tenor banjo necks called tenor harps. From 1927 onwards, the very first true wood-bodied acoustic tenor guitars appeared as production instruments made by both Gibson and Martin.

Almost all the major guitar makers, including Epiphone, Kay, Gretsch, Guild and National Reso-Phonic, have manufactured tenor (and plectrum) guitars as production instruments at various times. Budget tenor guitars by makers such as Harmony, Regal and Stella, were produced in large numbers in the 1950s and 1960s. National, formed by the Dopyera Brothers, also made significant numbers of resonator tenor and plectrum guitars between the 1920s and 1940s. Dobro, another company associated with the Dopyera Brothers, as well as National, also built various resonator tenor guitar models.

In 1934, Gibson introduced an acoustic archtop tenor guitar, the TG-50, based on the acoustic archtop six-string model, the L-50, with its production run lasting until 1958. In 1936 Gibson introduced the world's first commercially successful electric Spanish-style guitar, the ES-150. In early 1937 Gibson also began shipping two other versions of the ES-150: a tenor guitar (the EST-150, with four strings and a 23" scale, renamed the ETG-150 in 1940) and a plectrum version (the EPG-150, with a 27" scale). The ETG-150, was in continuous production until 1972.

In the mid-1950s electric solid-body tenor guitar models began to appear from companies such as Gibson, Gretsch, Guild, and Epiphone. These were mostly produced as one-off custom instruments but, for a short time in 1955, Gretsch manufactured an electric solid-bodied tenor guitar, the Gretsch 6127 DuoJet. Renewed interest in the tenor guitar led to the introduction of new solid-body electric models in the early 21st century, with companies such as Fender beginning production of a tenor version of their Telecaster model.

== Tuning ==
Tenor guitars are normally tuned in fifths, C_{3}−G_{3}−D_{4}−A_{4}, using the same tuning as the tenor banjo, mandola, or viola. Also common are tuning one octave below standard violin tuning, G_{2}−D_{3}−A_{3}−E_{4}, which is typical of the tenor banjo in Irish folk music or octave mandolin, and "Chicago tuning", D_{3}−G_{3}−B_{3}−E_{4}, the same as the top four strings of a standard guitar, or the baritone ukulele, a slightly smaller instrument usually strung with nylon strings.

== Plectrum guitar ==
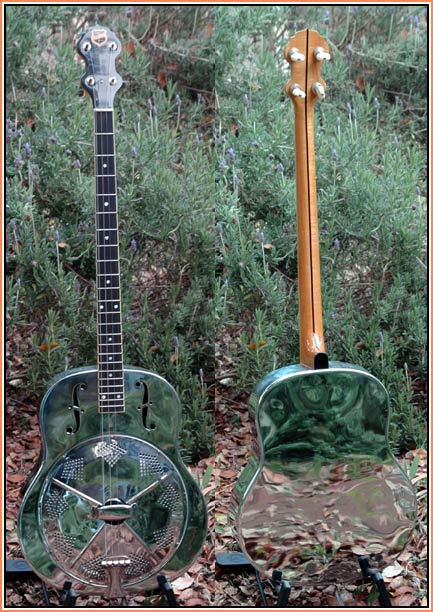
1928 National-style "plectrum guitar"

The "plectrum guitar" is a four-stringed guitar with a scale length of 26 to 27 inches (66 to 69 cm) and tunings usually based on the plectrum banjo, C_{3}−G_{3}−B_{3}−D_{4} or D_{3}−G_{3}−B_{3}−D_{4}. They are also commonly tuned like a mandocello, C_{2}−G_{2}−D_{3}−A_{3}, one octave down from the tenor guitar, much as the relationship between a viola and cello. Plectrum guitars have not been made in as large numbers as tenor guitars and are rarer. One of the best known plectrum guitarists from the Jazz Age was Eddie Condon, who started out on banjo in the 1920s and then switched to a Gibson L7 plectrum guitar in the 1930s.

== Use and performers ==
Tenor guitars initially came to significant commercial prominence in the late 1920s and early 1930s as tenor banjos were slowly being replaced by six-string guitars in jazz bands and dance orchestras. Tenor banjo players could double on tenor guitars to get a guitar sound without having to learn the six-string guitar. Two of the McKendrick brothers, both named Mike – "Big" Mike and "Little" Mike – doubled on tenor banjo and tenor guitar in jazz bands dating from the 1920s. "Big" Mike McKendrick both managed and played with Louis Armstrong's bands while "Little" Mike McKendrick played with various bands, including Tony Parenti.

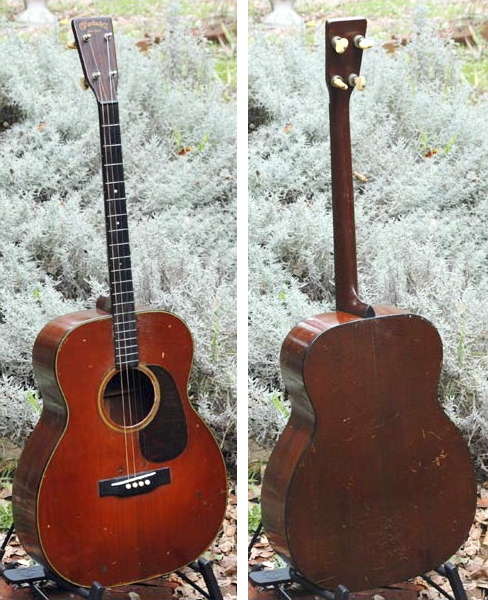
1932 C.F. Martin 0-18 T sunburst

The Delmore Brothers were a very influential pioneering country music duo from the early 1930s to the late 1940s that featured the tenor guitar. The Delmore Brothers were one of the original country vocal harmonizing sibling acts that established the mold for later similar acts, such as the Louvin Brothers, and even later, The Everly Brothers. The younger of the Delmore brothers, Rabon, played the tenor guitar as an accompaniment to his older brother, Alton's, six-string guitar. Rabon favored the Martin 0-18T tenor guitar and the Louvin Brothers later recorded a tribute album to the Delmores that featured Rabon's Martin 0-18T tenor played by mandolinist Ira Louvin, but tuned as the four treble guitar strings. Another 1930s band that featured the tenor guitar was the Hoosier Hotshots, commonly considered the creators of mid-western rural jazz. Their leader, Ken Trietsch, played the tenor guitar, as well as doubling on the tuba.

In the early 1930s Selmer Guitars in Paris manufactured four-string guitars based on guitar designs by the Italian luthier Mario Maccaferri that they marketed to banjo players for use as a second instrument. The two main four-string Selmer models were a regular tenor guitar with a smaller body and a 23 inch scale length for standard CGDA tuning, and the Eddie Freeman Special, with a larger body and a longer 25.5-inch scale length, using a reentrant tuning for the A string which was designed by English tenor banjoist Eddie Freeman to have a better six-string guitar sonority for rhythm guitar work than the normal tenor guitar with its high A string while still using the same chord shapes familiar to tenor banjoists. Selmer heavily promoted the guitar through Melody Maker and Eddie Freeman even wrote a special tune for it called "In All Sincerity". However, the guitar was not commercially successful in the 1930s, and many were subsequently converted to much more valuable six-string models. Originals of the Eddie Freeman Special are now very rare and are consequently highly valuable.

As the six-string guitar eventually became more popular in bands in the 1930s and 1940s, tenor guitars became less frequently played, although some tenor guitar models had been made in very large numbers throughout this period and are now still common.

Tenor guitars came to prominence again in the 1950s and 1960s amid the Dixieland jazz revival and the folk music boom. At this time, they were made by makers such as Epiphone, Gibson, Guild, and Gretsch as archtop acoustics and electrics, as well as a range of flat top models by Martin. A Martin 0-18T flattop acoustic tenor guitar was played in the late 1950s by Nick Reynolds of The Kingston Trio. During this period electric tenor guitars were advertised as "lead guitars", although the rationale for this is not now clear.

A major player of the electric tenor as a lead guitarist in the bebop and rhythm and blues styles from the 1940s to the 1970s was the jazz guitarist Tiny Grimes, who recorded with Cats and the Fiddle, Charlie Parker, Art Tatum, and others. Grimes used DGBE "Chicago" tuning on his tenor guitars, rather than traditional CGDA tuning.

=== Current use ===
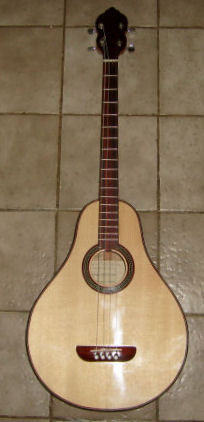
Modern replica of a 1930s Lyon & Healy tenor guitar. Background tiles are 20 cm square

Since 2001, there has been an increased interest in the tenor guitar, as evidenced by an increasing number of manufacturers, such as Eastwood Guitars, Blueridge, Gold Tone, Artist Guitars, Canora, Harley Benton, and Ibanez, offering tenor guitar models, and a greater number of specialist luthiers now building custom tenor guitar models or offering to modify existing instruments into tenor guitars.

Wes Borland, the guitarist for nu metal band Limp Bizkit plays a low-tuned (F^{♯}_{1}−F^{♯}_{2}−B_{2}−E_{3}) four-string guitar on the songs "Nookie", "The One", "Full Nelson", and "Stalemate" using a 4-string "Cremona" tenor guitar made by Master guitars. In April 2022, he commissioned PRS Guitars to make a custom four-string guitar.

Prominent U.K. users of the tenor guitar include the Lakeman brothers, Seth Lakeman and Sean Lakeman, and John McCusker and Ian Carr, who both play with the Kate Rusby Band. Irish folk artist Yawning Chasm primarily uses the tenor guitar.

Since 2010, Astoria, Oregon, has hosted an annual Tenor Guitar Gathering, on the basis of which some call it the "unofficial Tenor Guitar Capital of the World."

Warren Ellis plays a tenor guitar on the Nick Cave and the Bad Seeds album Push the Sky Away, and has custom tenor guitars built by Eastwood Guitars, with a shape modeled after a Fender Mustang but with a wider than usual neck to accommodate his fingerstyle playing. Eastwood currently offers several models of electric tenor guitar including the aforementioned Warren Ellis signature model, the semi-hollow Classic 4 Tenor, and the Tenorcaster.

== See also ==
- Alto guitar
- Cavaquinho

== Bibliography ==
- Gruhn, George with Carter, Walter (1999). Gruhn's Guide to Vintage Guitars - 2nd Edition - Updated and Expanded. United States: Miller Freeman Books. ISBN 0-87930-422-7. — An Identification Guide for American Fretted Instruments.
- Richards, Tobe A. (2007). The Tenor Guitar Chord Bible: Standard & Irish Tuning 2,880 Chords. United Kingdom: Cabot Books. ISBN 978-1-906207-05-2. — A comprehensive chord dictionary instructional guide featuring both standard and Irish tuning.
- Dean, Bruce. Tenor Guitar Chord Genius. Northern Musician Services. Tenor Guitar Chord Genius books in most tunings
