= Electric ukulele =

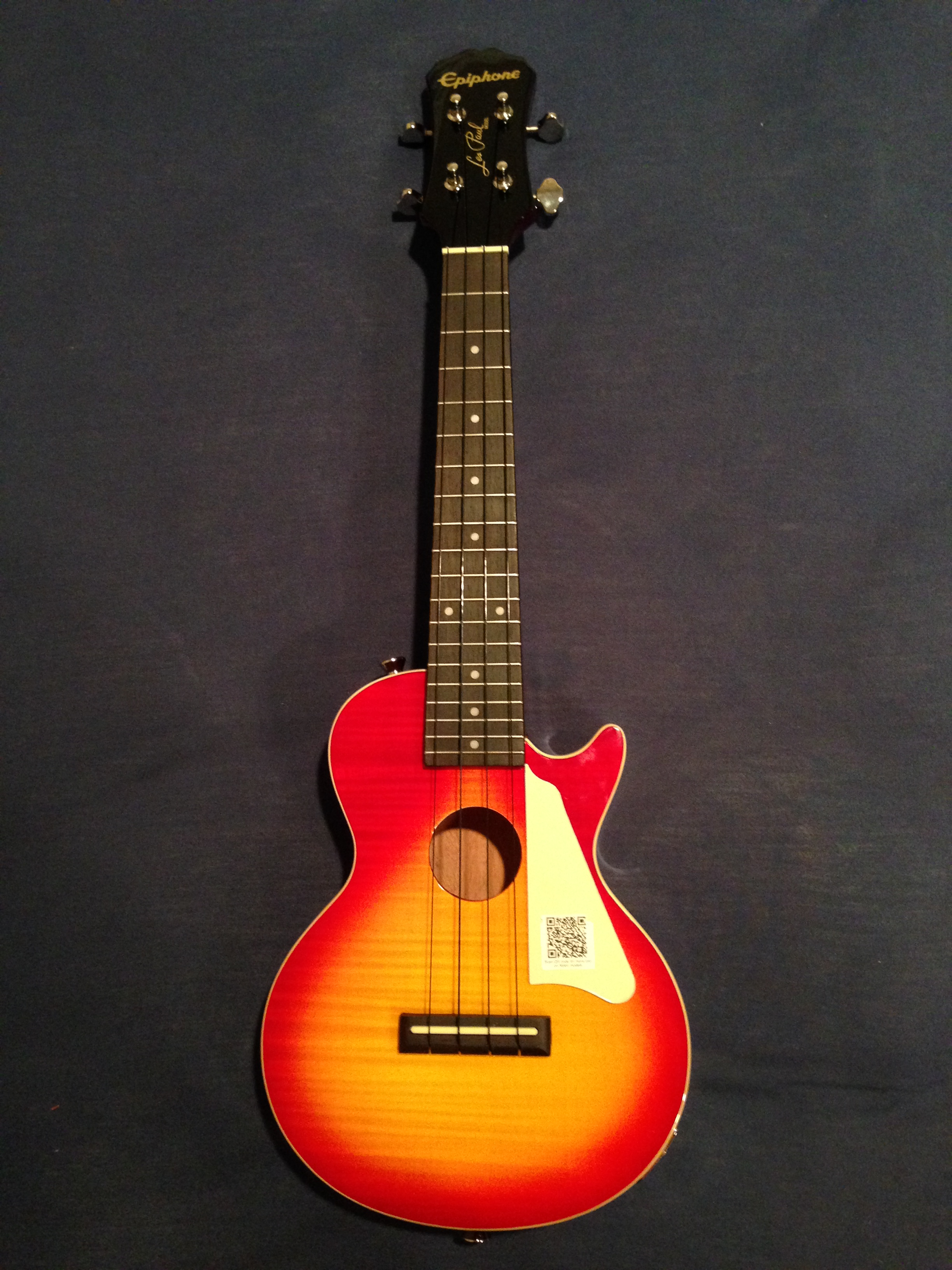
An acoustic/electric Epiphone Les Paul ukulele

An electric ukulele is a ukulele which is electrically amplified, via either piezoelectric or magnetic pickups.

== History ==
Ted McCarty of Gibson helped to design an electric ukulele for radio and television icon Arthur Godfrey in the 1950s. Godfrey played it during cigarette commercials. In 1957, the Uke-1 was listed in the Gibson price list for $30.

== Electric vs. electro-acoustic ==
A solid-body electric ukulele produces very little sound acoustically, requiring an amplifier to be heard from more than a few feet away. Some solid-body electric ukuleles have steel strings and active humbucker style or single-coil magnetic pickups, while other electric ukuleles are solid-body electric ukuleles with nylon strings and piezoelectric pick-ups under the saddle.

An electro-acoustic ukulele is a standard acoustic instrument to which a passive pickup has been added, a method similar to that used for an acoustic-electric guitar. Such ukuleles have nylon or gut strings, not the metal strings necessary for ukuleles with magnetic pickups. Electro-acoustic ukuleles may be played either unplugged or plugged into an amplifier. The acoustic and electric tone qualities will often differ between electric ukuleles, with some electro-acoustic ukuleles being built with the primary aim of producing quality sound when amplified rather than a consistent acoustic sound.

== Electric lap steel ukulele ==
The electric lap steel ukulele is an uncommon instrument, consisting of a small ukulele-shaped solid-body which is laid in the artist's lap. It has four strings raised above the neck, which are not pressed down onto a fretboard, but are played with a steel slide.

An electric lap steel ukulele is essentially a small lap steel guitar with only four strings. Similar instruments have been built by custom instrument makers, but the only production manufacturer was Jupiter Creek Music (Australia) before they closed their business in October 2012.

== Current manufacturers ==
- Epiphone
- EleUke
- Fender
- Ovation Guitar Company
- Stagg Music
- Vox
