= Original Musical Instrument Company =

Brand of resonator guitars, formerly a company

- Company type: Division
- Industry: Musical instruments
- Founded: 1967; 59 years ago
- Founder: Rudy & Emile Dopyera
- Fate: Acquired by Gibson in 1993, becoming a brand
- Headquarters: Nashville, Tennessee, United States
- Area served: Worldwide
- Products: Resonator guitars
- Owner: Gibson (1993–)

Original (formerly "Original Musical Instrument Company", also known for its acronym "OMI") is an American brand currently owned by Gibson through its subsidiary Epiphone. The company uses the brand to produce and commercialize resonator guitars.

The company was formed in 1967 by two of the original John Dopyera brothers, Rudy and Emile, to manufacture resonator guitars. They produced their first instruments under the brand "Hound Dog". In 1970 the company reacquired the Dobro name that had been sold in 1966 to Semie Mosely of Mosrite, although it carried on using the Hound Dog name for a time.

In 1993 the Gibson Corporation acquired Original, and subsequently changed the name to "Original Acoustic Instruments", moving the manufacturing operation to its headquarters in Nashville, Tennessee. Gibson Corporation still produces Dobro resonator guitars through its subsidiary company, Epiphone.
