= Beltona Resonator Instruments =

British musical instrument maker

- Company type: Private
- Industry: Musical instruments
- Founded: 1990; 35 years ago
- Founder: Steve Evans and Bill Johnson
- Headquarters: Ōpunake, New Zealand
- Products: Resonator guitars, mandolins, and ukuleles
- Website: beltona.net

Beltona Resonator Instruments is an English/New Zealand musical instruments manufacturing company currently based in Ōpunake, New Zealand. Since its foundation, Beltona has been producing resonator instruments, more specifically guitars, mandolins and ukuleles.

== History ==
The company started as a partnership in Leeds, England between luthier Steve Evans and engineer Bill Johnson, who shared an interest in resonator instruments. In the mid-1990s and with the purpose of cutting down production costs, the company started to use materials such as carbon and glass fibre in the production of instruments.

These materials had several advantages over metal including weight, strength and speed of production. Beltona's success led the company to concentrate only on instruments made of resin since 2002. By then, Evans became the sole owner of the business, moving it to his native New Zealand. The company returned to England in 2013. Beltona was based in the UK once again from 2013 to 2023, returning to New Zealand in September 2023.

== Musicians ==
- Michael Messer
- Keb' Mo'
- Kristina Olsen
