= Paul McGill (luthier) =

Paul McGill is an American luthier, specializing in classical, steel string as well as the originator of a unique type of resonator guitar based upon the Brazilian Del Vecchio designs of the 1930s.

In 1985, McGill moved to Nashville to work as a repairman for Gruhn Guitars. A seminal moment in his career occurred in late 1992, when Earl Klugh asked McGill to build a more refined version of a Del Vecchio resonator guitar that Klugh had received from Chet Atkins. Though Klugh enjoyed the Brazilian guitar's sound, he found it delicate, with poor intonation. Though McGill was apprehensive, fearing that building such an unusual instrument would ruin his reputation as a builder of classical guitars, he built the instrument as requested. Klugh loved the guitar, and immediately requested that McGill build others.

McGill guitars have been used as recording instruments by Chet Atkins, Earl Klugh, Muriel Anderson, Peter White, Marc Antoine, Jim Stafford, Wayne Wesley Johnson, Nokie Edwards, Don Potter, Steve Earl, Larry Koonse, John Standerfer, Beth Nielsen Chapman, And many more.

In 1998 McGill made his first Nylon string electric design, the "Super Ace". The guitar is the main nylon string performance instrument of both Peter White, and Marc Antoine.

== Resources ==
- Adam Moore Southern Gentleman: an interview with Paul McGill Premier Guitar, Oct 2007
