= Resonator guitar =

Fretted string instrument modified for loudness

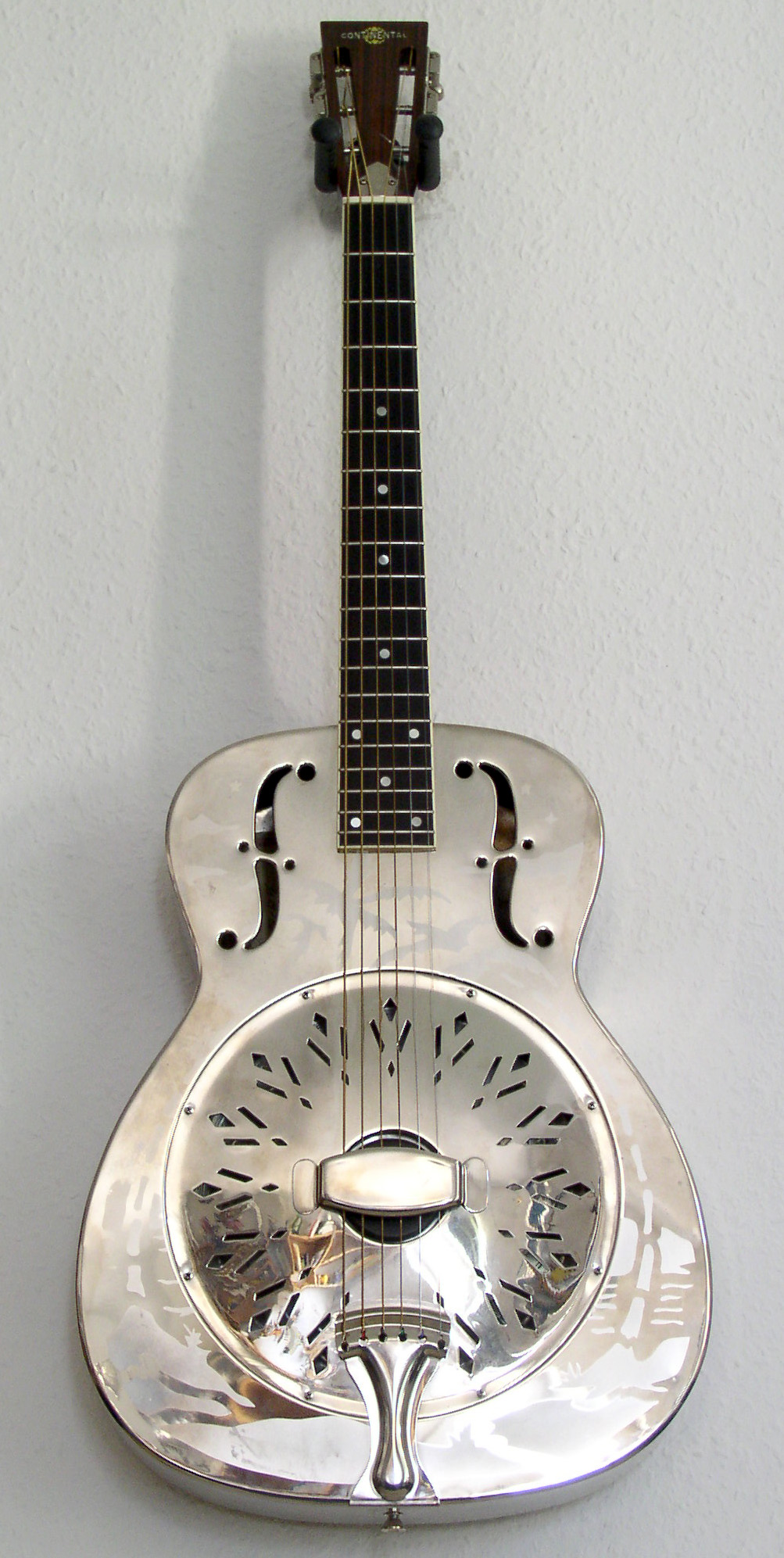
- Single cone resonator with metal body

String instrument
- Other names: Dobro
- Hornbostel–Sachs classification: 321.322
- Inventor: John Dopyera
- Developed: 1920s
- Volume: Medium
- Attack: Fast

Related instruments
- Acoustic guitar

Builders
- Dobro, National, National Reso-Phonic, Del Vecchio-Dinamico

A resonator guitar or resophonic guitar (often generically called a "Dobro") is an acoustic guitar that produces sound by conducting string vibrations through the bridge to one or more spun metal cones (resonators), instead of to the guitar's sounding board (top). Resonator guitars were originally designed to be louder than regular acoustic guitars, which were overwhelmed by horns and percussion instruments in dance orchestras. They became prized for their distinctive tone, and found life with bluegrass music and the blues well after electric amplification solved the problem of inadequate volume.

Resonator guitars are of two styles:

- Square-necked guitars played in lap steel guitar style
- Round-necked guitars played in conventional guitar style or steel guitar style

There are three main resonator designs:

- The tricone, with three metal cones, designed by the first National company
- The single-cone "biscuit" design of other National instruments
- The single inverted-cone design (also known as a spider bridge) of Dobro brand instruments and instruments that copy the Dobro design

Many variations of all these styles and designs have been produced under many brand names. The body of a resonator guitar may be made of wood, metal, or occasionally other materials. Typically there are two main sound holes, positioned on either side of the fingerboard extension. In the case of single-cone models, the sound holes are either both circular or both f-shaped, and symmetrical. The older tricone design has irregularly shaped sound holes. Cutaway body styles may truncate or omit the lower f-hole.

== History ==
=== National tricone ===
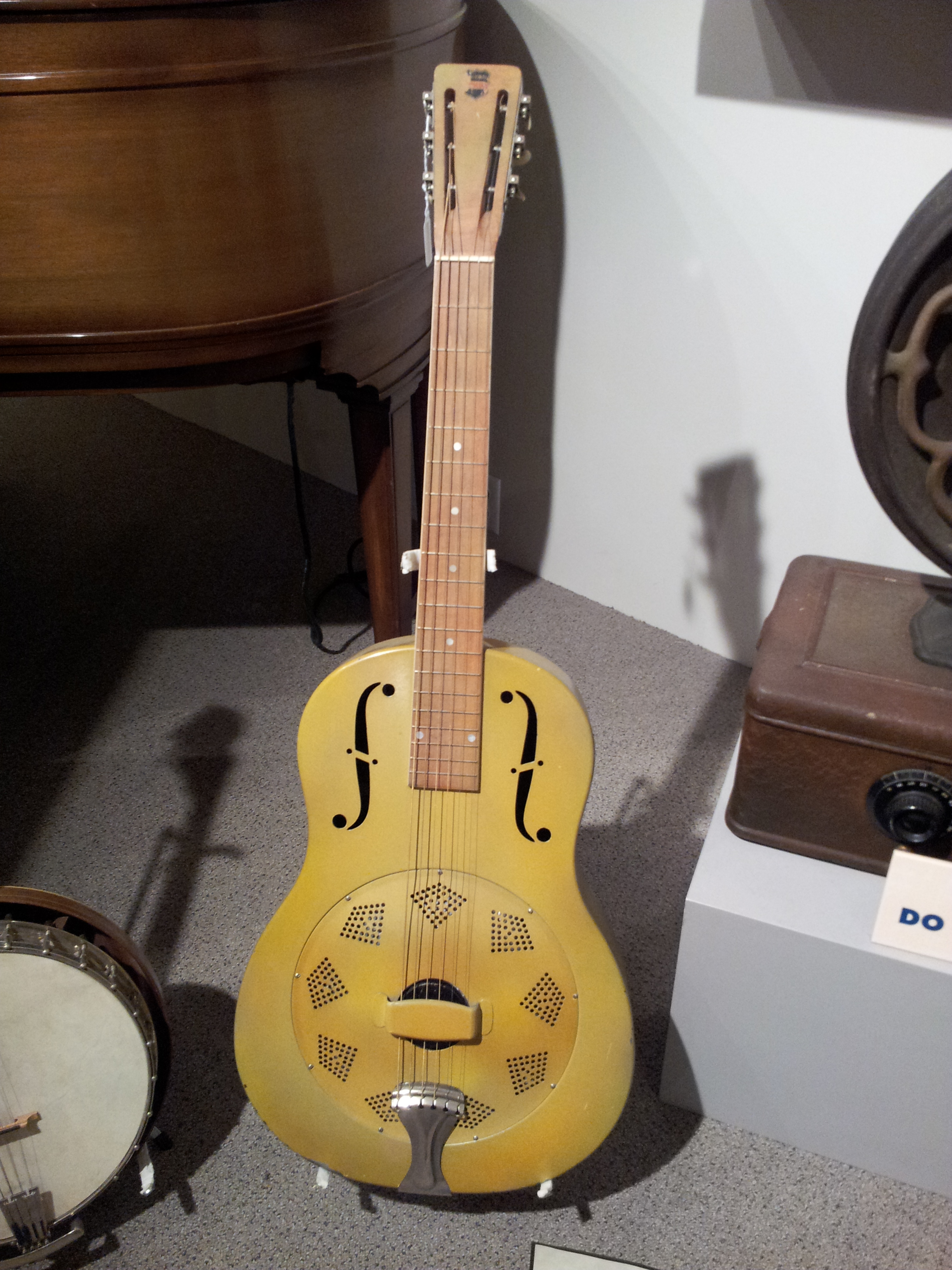
Early resonator guitar

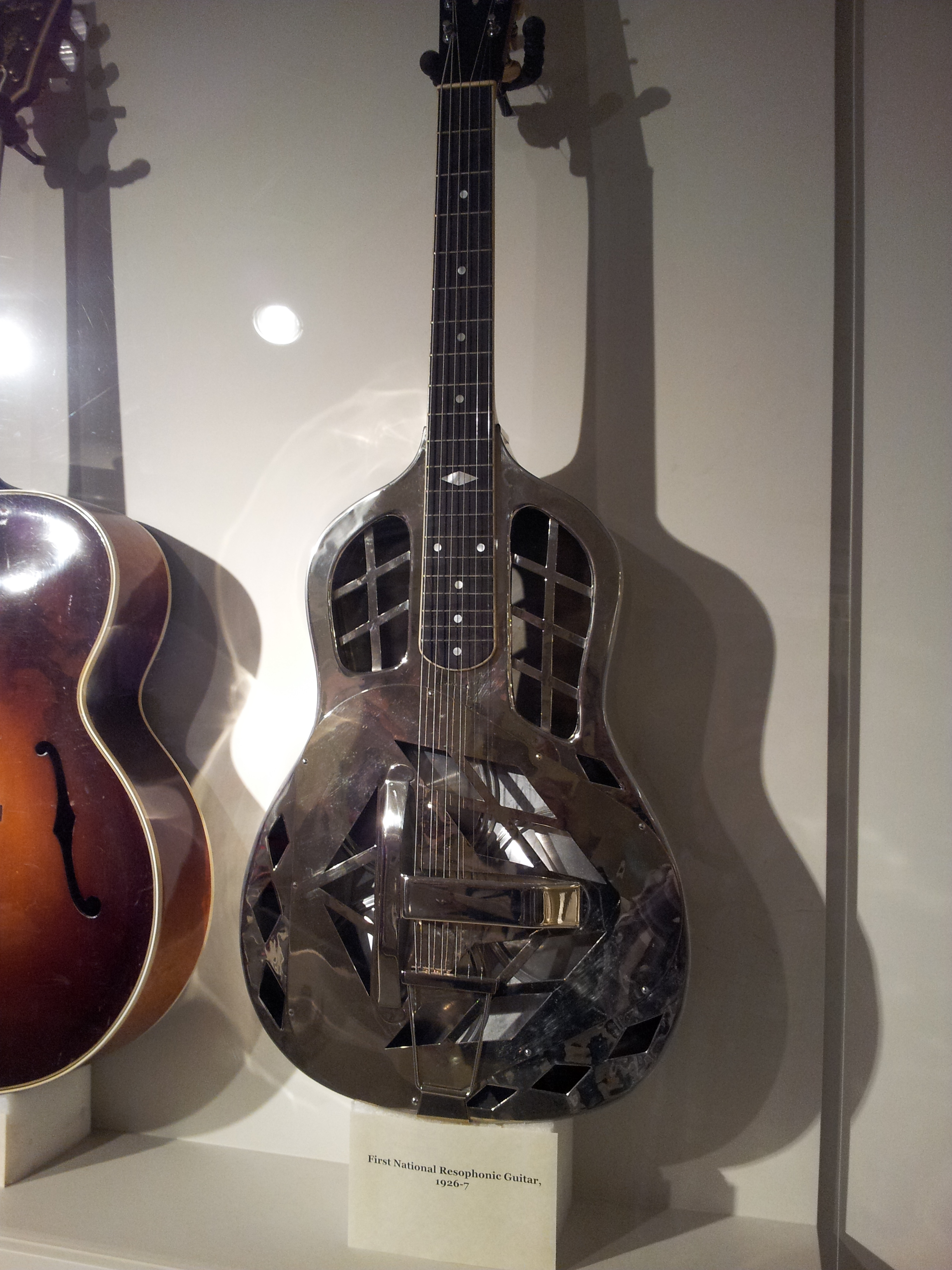
First National resophonic guitar (c. 1926–7)

John Dopyera, responding to a request by the steel guitar player George Beauchamp, developed the resonator guitar to produce an instrument that could produce sufficient volume to compete with brass and reed instruments. Dopyera experimented with configurations of up to four resonator cones and with cones composed of several different metals.

In 1927, Dopyera and Beauchamp formed the National String Instrument Corporation to manufacture resonator guitars under the brand name "National". The first models were metal-bodied, and featured three conical aluminum resonators joined by a T-shaped aluminum bar that supported the bridge—a system called the tricone. National originally produced wooden-bodied Tricone models at their factory in Los Angeles, California. They called these models the Triolian, but made only 12 of them. They changed the body meant for tricones to single-cone models, but kept the name.

=== Dobro ===
In 1928, Dopyera left National to form the Dobro Manufacturing Company with his brothers Rudy, Emile, Robert, and Louis, "Dobro" being a contraction of Dopyera Brothers' and also meaning "good" in their native Slovak language. Dobro released a competing resonator guitar with a single resonator with its concave surface uppermost, often described as bowl-shaped, under a distinctive circular perforated metal cover plate with the bridge at its center resting on an eight-legged aluminum spider. This system was cheaper to produce, and produced more volume than National's tricone.

Over time, the word "dobro" has become a genericized trademark used to refer to any resonator guitar.

=== National biscuit ===
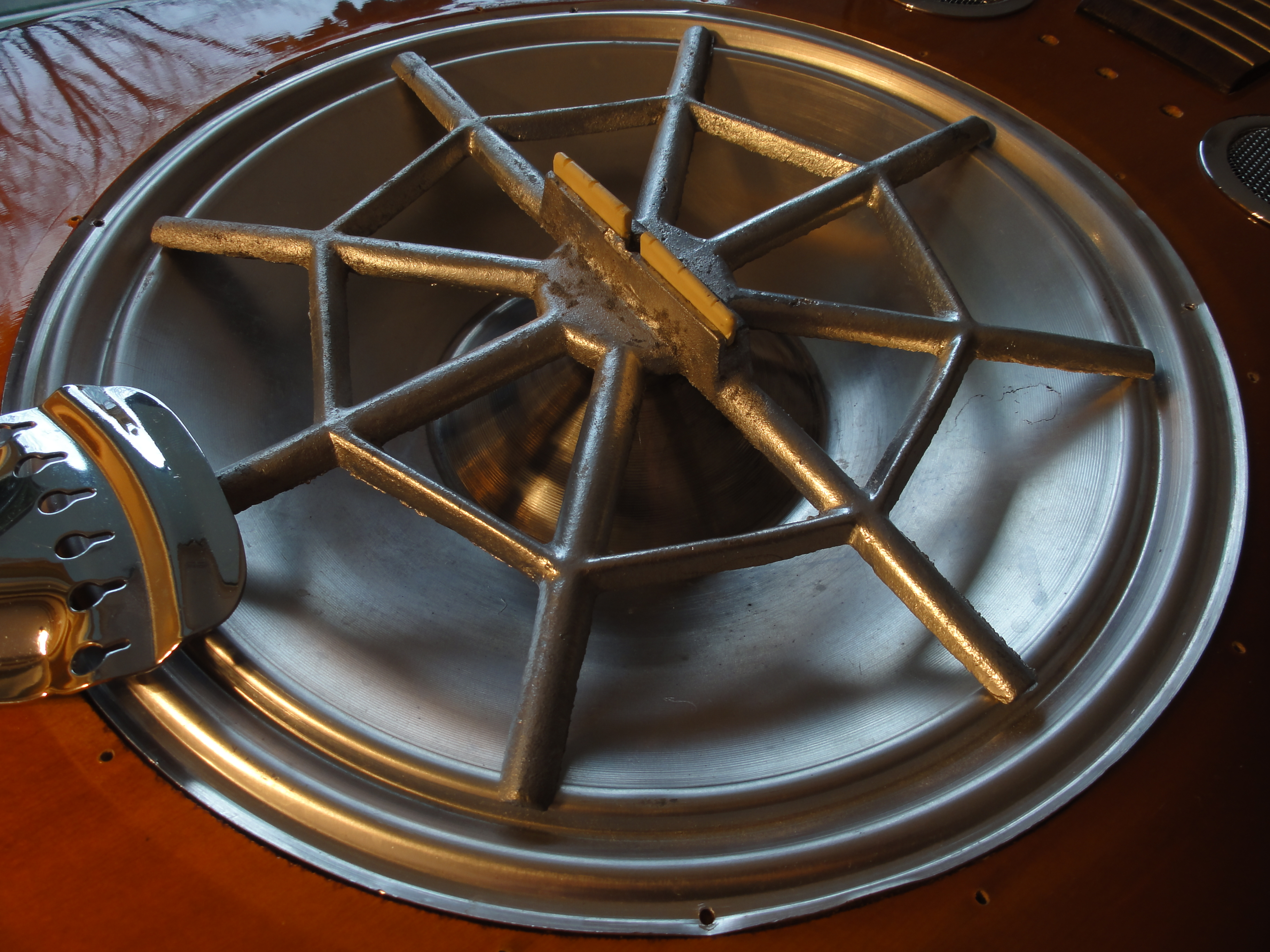
Dobro-style "spider" resonator on a Hohner guitar (cover removed)

National countered the Dobro with its own single resonator model, which Dopyera had designed before he left the company. They also continued to produce the tricone design, which many players preferred for its tone. Both National single and tricone resonators remained conical, with their convex surfaces uppermost. Single resonator models used a wooden biscuit at the cone apex to support the bridge. At this point, both companies sourced many components from Adolph Rickenbacker, including the aluminum resonators.

=== National Dobro, Hound Dog, and Gibson ===
After much legal action, the Dopyera brothers gained control of both National and Dobro in 1932, and subsequently merged them into the "National Dobro Corporation". However, they ceased all resonator guitars production following the U.S. entry into World War II in 1941.

Emile Dopyera (also known as Ed Dopera) manufactured Dobros from 1959, before selling the company and trademark to Semie Moseley, who merged it with his Mosrite guitar company and manufactured Dobros for a time.

In 1967, Rudy and Emile Dopyera formed the Original Musical Instrument Company (OMI) to manufacture resonator guitars, first branded Hound Dog. In 1970 they again acquired the Dobro trademark, Mosrite having gone into temporary liquidation.

The Gibson Guitar Corporation acquired OMI in 1993, and announced it would defend its right to exclusive use of the Dobro trademark—which many people commonly used for any resonator guitar. As of 2006, Gibson produces several round sound hole models under the Dobro name, and cheaper f-hole models both under the Hound Dog name and also its Epiphone brand. All have a single resonator, and many are available in either round or square neck.

=== Other National instruments ===
After the formation of the National Dobro Corporation, the term National was often used to refer to an instrument with a non-inverted cone, to distinguish these designs from the inverted-cone Dobro. Makers particularly used it for single-cone biscuit designs, as the relatively elaborate and expensive tricone was for some time out of production. Players and collectors also used the term for the older tricone instruments, which despite their softer volume and rarity were still preferred by some players.

In 1942, the National Dobro Corporation, which no longer produced Dobros or other resonator instruments, reorganized under the name Valco. Valco produced a large volume and variety of fretted instruments under many names, with National as its premium brand. By the early 1960s, Valco again produced resonator guitars for mail order under the brand name National. These instruments had biscuit resonators and bodies of wood and fiberglass.

In the late 1980s, the National brand and trademark reappeared with the formation of National Reso-Phonic Guitars. The company produces six-string resonator guitars of all three traditional resonator types, focusing on reproducing the feel and sound of old instruments. Its other resonator instruments include a 12-string guitar, ukuleles and mandolins.

=== Non-US instruments ===
==== Brazil ====
Casa Del Vecchio Ltda. of São Paulo, Brazil, has produced a wide range of guitars and other string instruments since Angelo Del Vecchio founded the company in 1902. In the 1930s, they began producing resonator guitars, resulting in their most famous model: the Dinâmico, (their trade term for resophonic instruments). In addition to the Dinâmico guitar, which is still in production, Del Vecchio also produced Dinâmico cavaquinhos, approximately like a resonator ukulele, and resonator mandolins. They also produce standard acoustic instruments, as well as Hawaiian-style lap steel guitars.

==== Czech Republic ====
In the late 1990s Amistar, a Czech Republic manufacturer, began marketing tricone resonator guitars.

==== Australia ====
Wayne Acoustic Guitars produced a spider bridge resonator guitar in the 1940s and 1950s in Australia. They were made out of cheap Australian timber using a tone ring rather than a tone well but they had no neck reinforcement and a pressed (rather than spun) cone, often called a pillow cone due to the shapes pressed into the face to strengthen the cone. Many examples exist today. As of 2010, Don Morrison was producing resonators under the Donmo brand name.

==== Asia ====
Asian brands such as Regal, Johnson, Recording King, Republic Guitars, and Rogue also produce or import a wide variety of comparatively inexpensive resonator guitars. Johnson has also produced resonator ukuleles and mandolins.

==== South Africa ====
A company called Gallotone in South Africa produced resonator guitars in the 1950s and 1960s..

== Playing ==
Resonator guitars are popularly used in bluegrass music and in blues. Traditionally, bluegrass players used square necked Dobro-style instruments played as a steel guitar while blues players favored round-necked National-style guitars, often played with a bottleneck.

=== Styles and positions ===
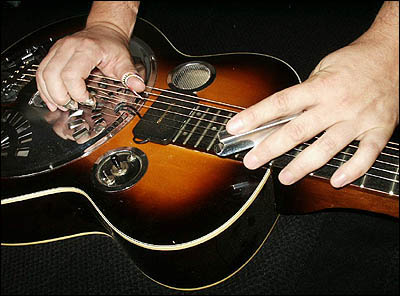
Resonator guitar played lap steel guitar style

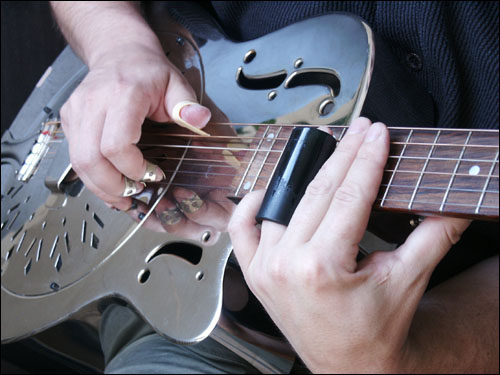
Resonator guitar played bottleneck style

The resonator guitar is most often played as a lap steel guitar, and the more common square-necked version is limited to this playing position. Square neck instruments are always set up with the high action favored by steel guitar players, and tuned to a suitable open tuning.

The round necked version is equally capable in either lap steel or Spanish guitar position. It may be set up with a variety of action heights, ranging from the half-inch favored for steel guitar (making use of the frets almost impossible) to the small fraction of an inch used by conventional guitarists. A compromise is most common, allowing use of a bottleneck on the top strings but also use of the frets as desired, with the guitar played in the conventional position.

Many different tunings are used. Some square neck tunings are not recommended for round neck resonator guitars, owing to the high string tension required, which in turn requires the stronger square neck. Slack-key guitar tunings are most suitable for bottleneck playing, and conventional E-A-D-G-B-E guitar tuning is also popular.

== Players ==
=== In bluegrass music ===
Musicians with resonator guitars

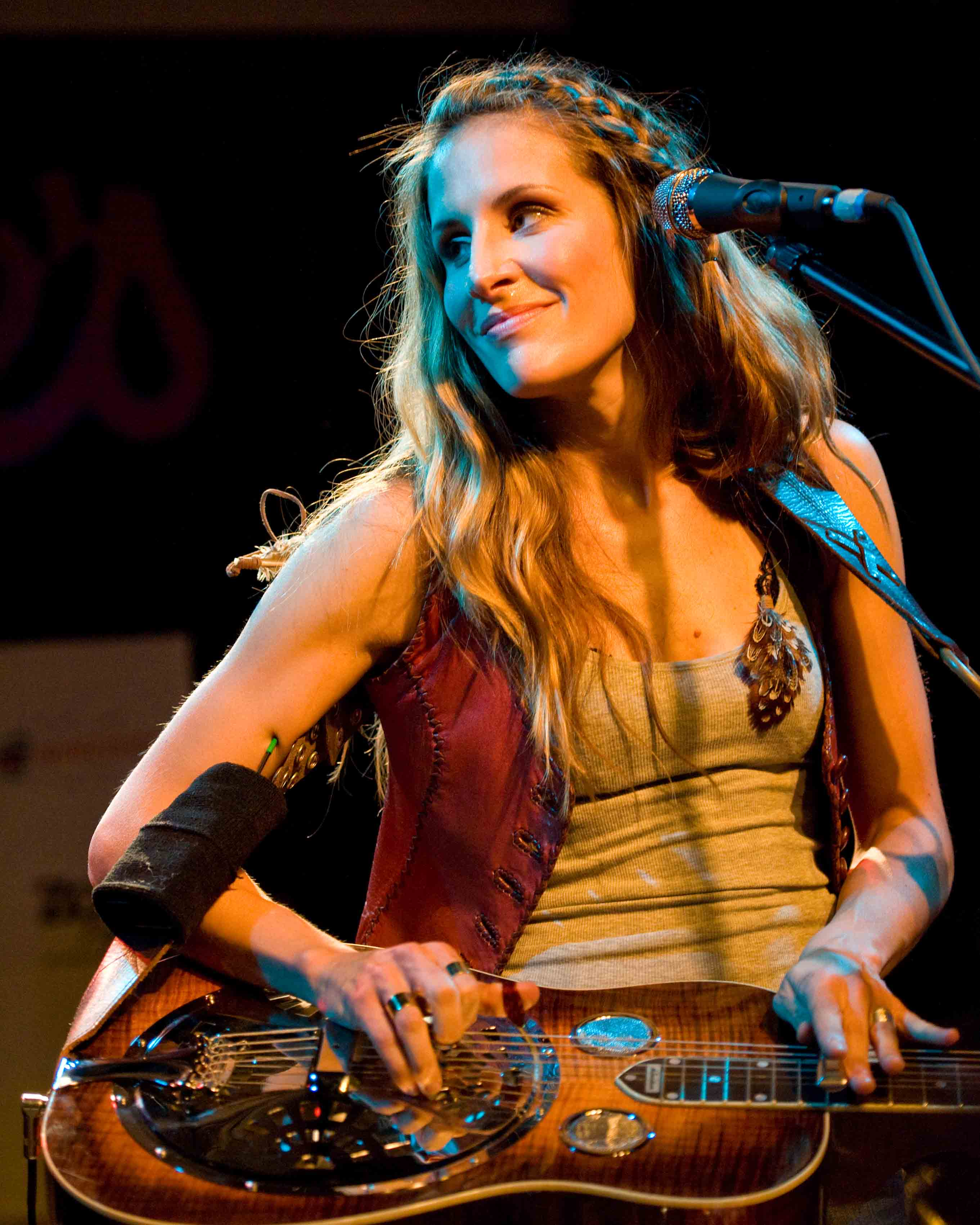
Emily Robison with a Dobro (2010)

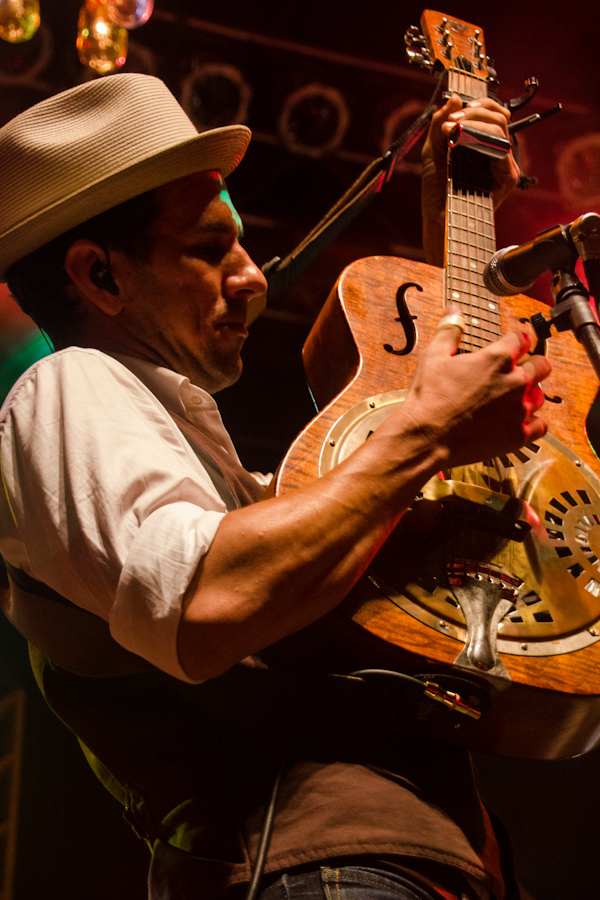
Gill Landry, 2010

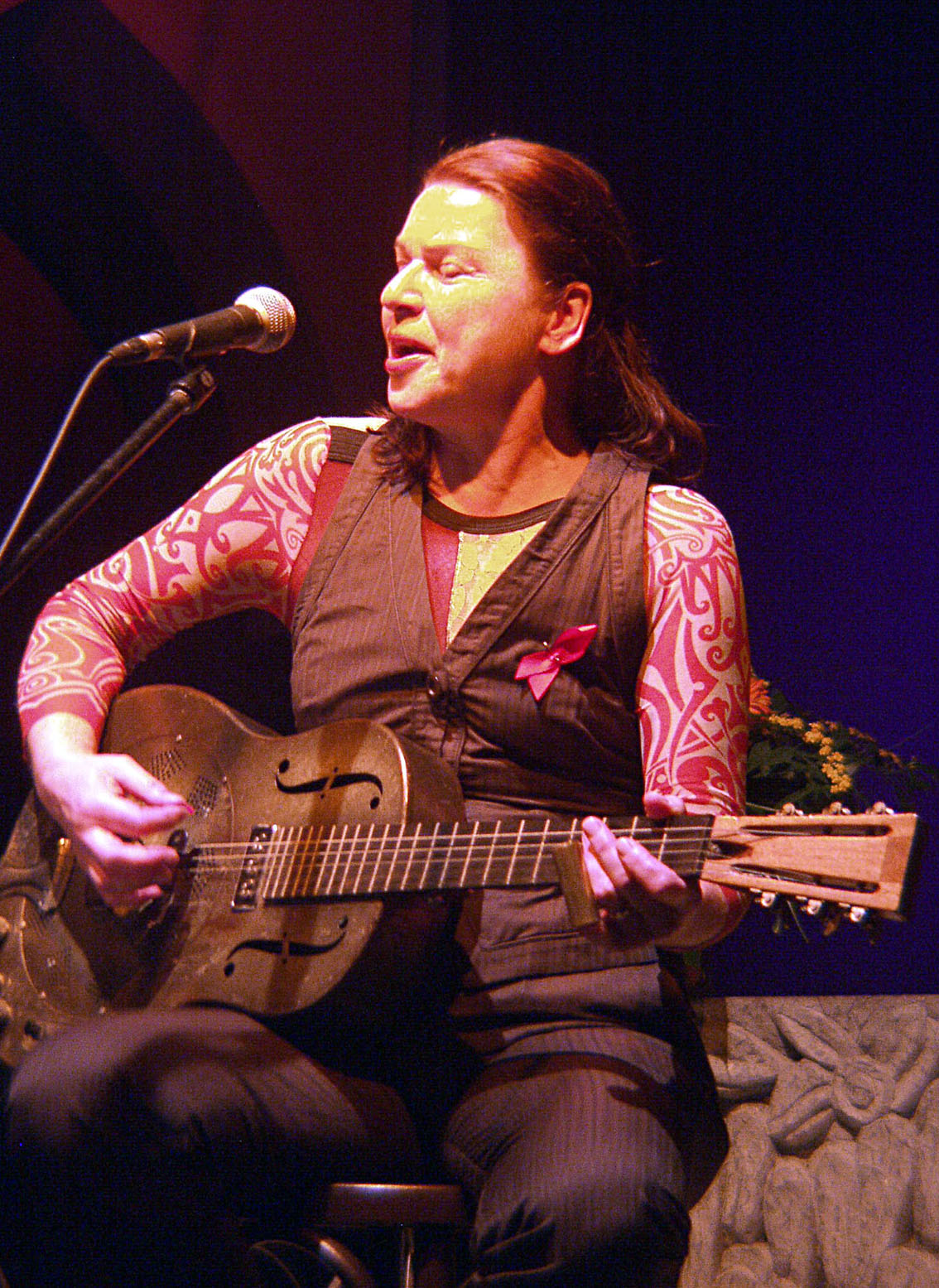
Inga Rumpf, 2004

The resonator guitar was introduced to bluegrass music by Josh Graves, who played with Flatt and Scruggs, in the mid-1950s. Graves used the hard-driving, syncopated three-finger picking style developed by Earl Scruggs for the five-string banjo. Modern players continue to play the instrument this way, with one notable exception being the late Tut Taylor who played with a flat pick.

Tuning for the resonator guitar within the bluegrass genre is most often an open G with the strings pitched to D G D G B D or G B D G B D, from the lowest to highest. Occasionally variant tunings are used, such as an open D: D A D F# A D.

Other notable bluegrass players include Jerry Douglas, Mike Auldridge, Rob Ickes, Phil Leadbetter, Andy Hall, and Sally Van Meter.

=== In country music ===
The resonator guitar was used in older country music, notably by Bashful Brother Oswald of Roy Acuff's band, but was largely supplanted by the pedal steel guitar during the 1950s. Despite this, the instrument is still frequently used as an alternative to the steel guitar. James Burton and Grady Martin played flat picked dobro on many recordings. Leon McAuliffe initially played a dobro before exclusively transitioning to electric lap and console steel guitars.

=== In blues music ===
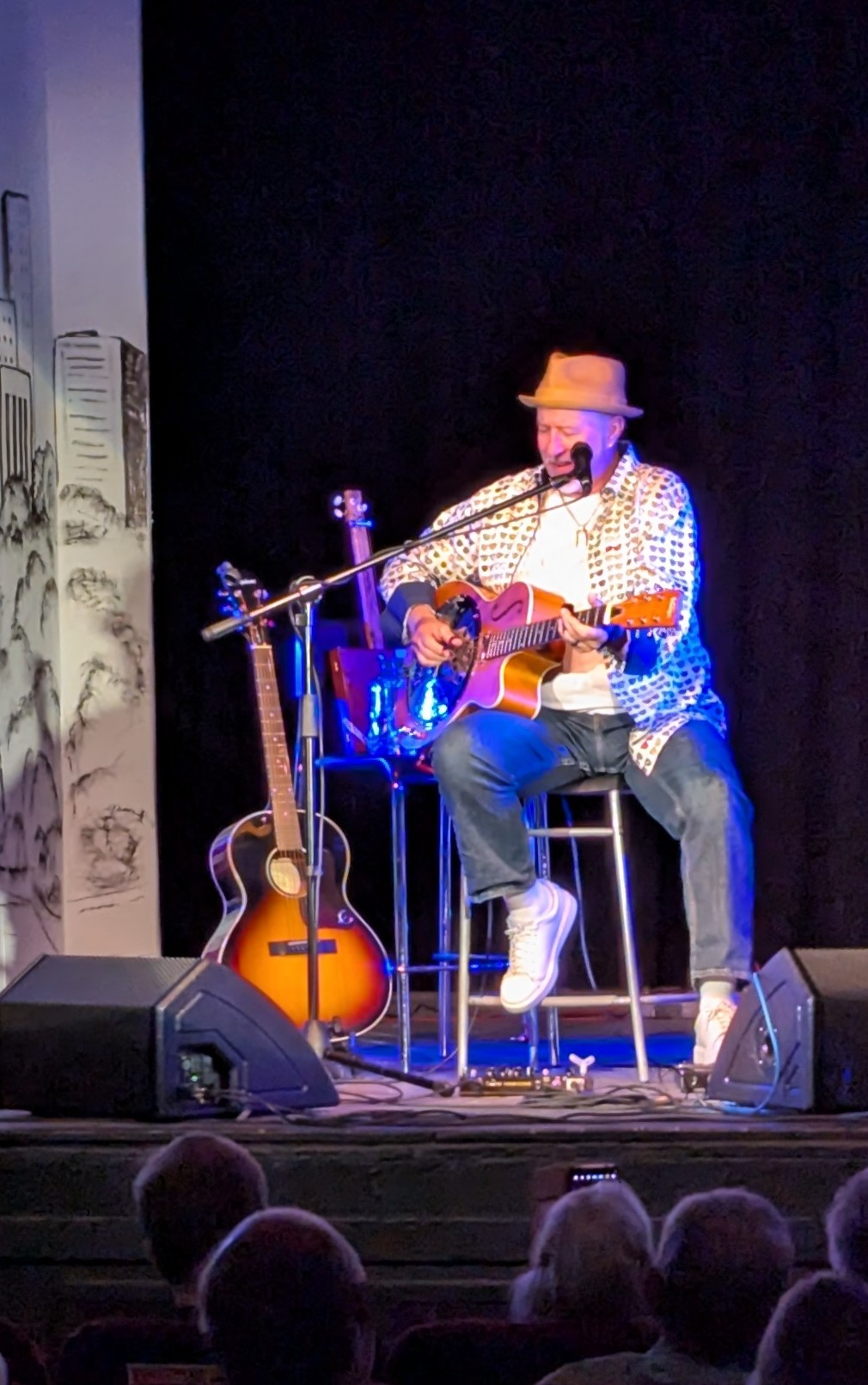
Stacey Mitchhart playing a Resonator guitar at the Bromley Blues Club July 2025

The resonator guitar is also significant to the world of blues music, particularly the Southern style of country blues that grew out of the Mississippi Delta and Louisiana. Unlike country and bluegrass players, most blues players play the resonator guitar in the standard guitar position. Many use slides or bottlenecks.

Many players in the 1920s and 1930s, including Bo Carter, and others like Bukka White, Son House, Tampa Red and Blind Boy Fuller, used the instruments because they were louder than standard acoustic guitars, which enabled them to play for a larger crowd in areas that did not yet have electricity for amplifiers. For the same reason street musicians like Arvella Gray used resonator guitars while busking, e.g. on Chicago's Maxwell Street.

One of the few Delta Blues players to play lap style in the 1930s was Black Ace, also known as B.K. Turner. He toured and recorded with his mentor Oscar "Buddy" Woods, who also played lap style Resonator guitar and Lap Steel. Woods, who was fifteen years older than Ace, taught him his guitar playing techniques.

The instrument is still used by some blues players, notably Taj Mahal, Eric Sardinas, Alvin Hart, The Deacon Brandon Reeves, Warren Haynes, Derek Trucks, Doyle Bramhall II, Roland Chadwick, John Hammond Jr., Roy Rogers, John Mooney, and Megan Lovell of Larkin Poe. Mark Knopfler has also played the guitar, and his National resonator is pictured on the cover of the Dire Straits album Brothers in Arms.

== Varieties ==
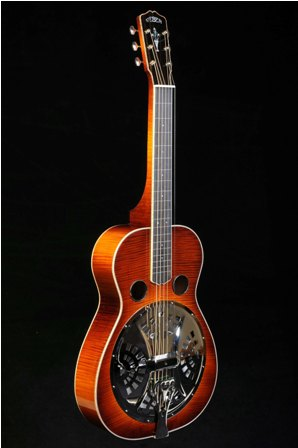
Weber Bandit Resophonic Guitar with square neck

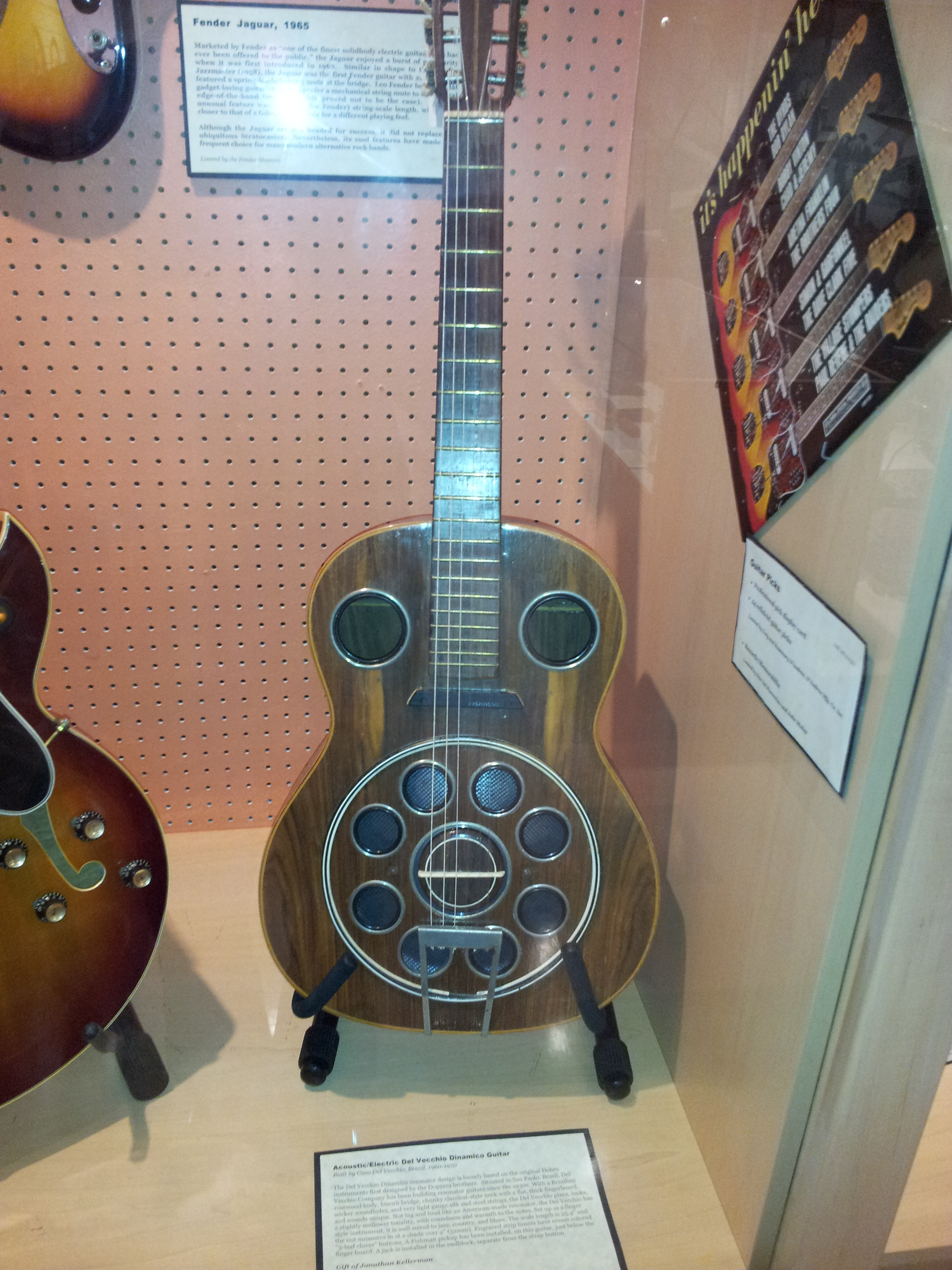
Electric resonator by Del Vecchio

Single resonator guitars with a bowl resonator and spider (Dobro style) are often heard in bluegrass music, while tricone (National style) instruments are still preferred by many blues players. Single-resonator biscuit (also sometimes called National style) instruments are also produced, and give a different sound again.

Many bluegrass players prefer wooden bodies, blues players either metal or wood. The early metal-bodied instruments were generally of better quality than the earliest wooden-bodied ones, but this may not be the case with more recent instruments. Metal bodies may be brass, aluminum or steel. Fiberglass has also been used as a body material. Both metal and wooden bodies are often painted, or wooden bodies may be stained or lacquered, metal bodies may be plated or plain.

Bluegrass players tend to use square necks, while blues players tend to prefer round necks. Square-necked guitars give a slightly greater variety of possible tunings, while round-necked guitars give a much greater variety of playing positions.

Single resonator instruments can have round sound holes with screens, or round sound holes without screens, which many players used to remove to improve the bass response. They can also have f-holes, often with gauze screens that are also sometimes removed but have an important function in strengthening the belly particularly if the body is of wood.

An enormous number of combinations are possible, most can be found either on old or new instruments or both, and many styles of music can be played on any resonator guitar.

=== Electric resonators ===
Though the original aim of the resonator was increased volume, some modern instruments incorporate electric pickups and related technology. Many modern makers produce instruments with one of a variety of pickup types—and some players retrofit pickups to non-electric instruments. Most commonly, resonator guitars use piezoelectric pickups (contact type transducers) placed under the bridge or elsewhere on the instrument, or use specialized microphones placed inside the instrument or directly in front of the cone to preserve the resonator's distinctive tone.

However, all acoustic and semi-acoustic styles are very sensitive to audio feedback, making the design and placement of these pickups extremely critical and specialized. Some modern models are manufactured with both piezoelectric and magnetic pickups. In addition, some piezoelectric styles are active pickups, in that they incorporate a preamplifier that increases the output of the pickup to match modern amplifier inputs. More recently, solid body electric resonator guitars have appeared. These instruments incorporate one or more magnetic pickups, and are played via amplification.

== Other resonator instruments ==
As well as resonator guitars, resonators have been used on:

Other resonator instruments

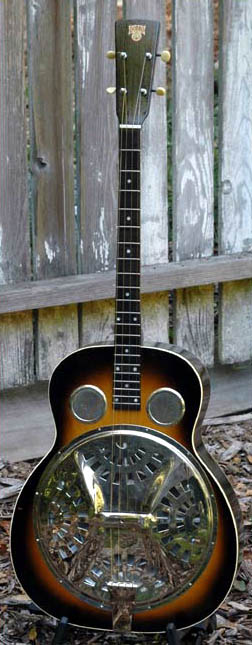
Dobro-style 37 tenor guitar

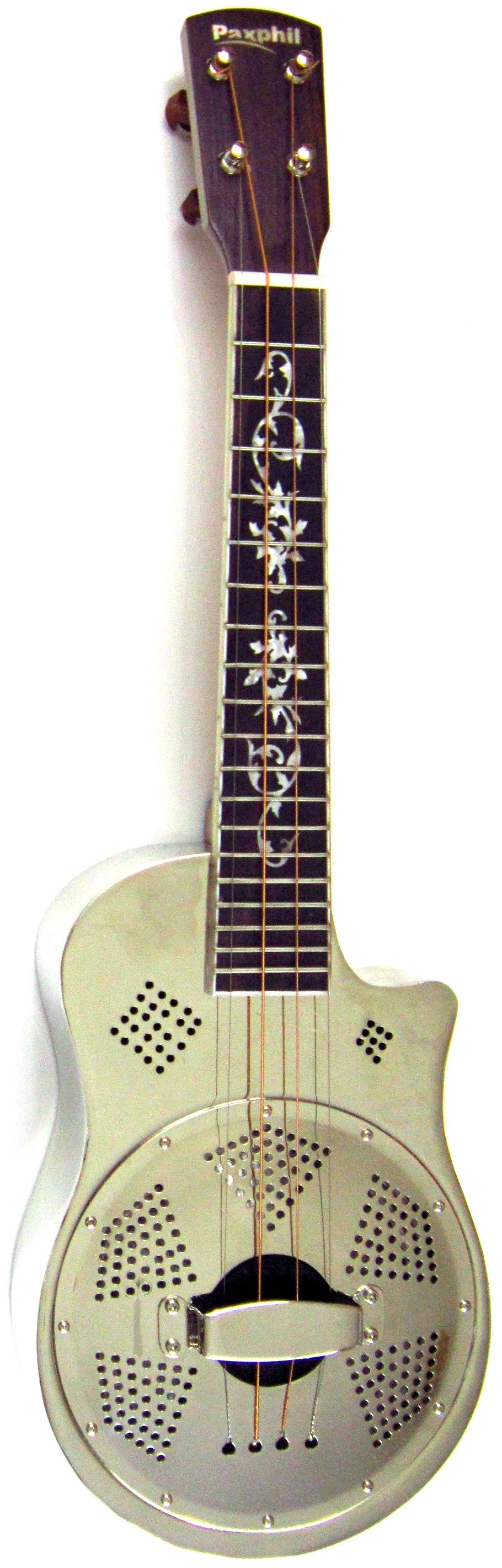
Resonator ukulele

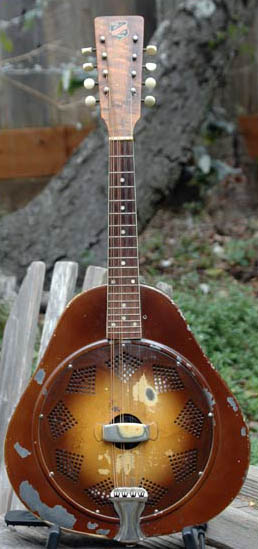
1930 resonator mandolin

- Basses, available from Regal
- Ukuleles, (see Resonator ukulele) produced by National and Dobro 1928-1940
- Banjos
- Tenor guitars
- Mandolins and mandolas
- Mountain/Appalachian dulcimers
- Viola guitars

== Brands ==
Historic brands of resonator guitar still in use today include National, Dobro, and Regal. None of these brands remain owned by their original companies. Each returned after one or more long breaks in production:

- The National name is now used by National Reso-Phonic Guitars, a company founded in 1987 and unconnected to the original National, specializes in reproductions of historic instruments of all brands, not just National pattern instruments.
- The Dobro name has undergone several ownership changes throughout history, and has been owned by Gibson Guitar Corporation since 1993. Gibson manufactured Dobro branded instruments under its Epiphone division up to 2020. Since then, no Dobro branded instruments have been produced.
- The Regal name, similar to Dobro, has been bought and sold several times since its original owners went defunct; the name has been a brand of Saga Musical Instruments since 1987.

=== US patents ===
- #1,741,453 covering the tricone.
- #1,896,484 covering the Dobro.
- #1,808,756 covering the biscuit single cone resonator, lodged in the name of Beauchamp.

== See also ==
- Brahms guitar, a classical guitar that features an external resonator.
- Slide guitar
