= Saga Musical Instruments =

- Industry: Musical instruments
- Headquarters: United States
- Website: Official website

Saga Musical Instruments is a manufacturer and wholesale distributor of stringed instruments, particularly fretted instruments and members of the violin family, and parts and accessories for them. They own twenty-two brands, fifteen are listed below.

Trademarks of Saga

== Brands ==
Their brands include:

- Blueridge
- Gitane
- Appalachian
- J Navarro
- Rover
- Kentucky
- Anton Brenton
- Hamano
- Regal
- Durango
- Trinity College
- Gold Star
- Cremona
- H. Siegler
- Hamano
- Diamond Head
- Recital Instruments

== Blueridge ==
The Blueridge brand are Chinese-built and have won praise from publications such as Guitarist Magazine, Total Guitar and Music Maker for quality and affordability. The company specializes in historic and pre-war reproductions that are used by folk and bluegrass players. Endorsed by UK bluesman Martin Harley, two Blueridge models were used to break the world record for the highest gig ever played.

Played by Sierra Ferrell, Melvin Goins, Ralph Stanley II, Larry Sparks and many more.

== Families of instruments ==
- Guitar family brands include: Accent, Blueridge, Bristol, Burns, Catala, Cigano, J. Navarro, P. Saez, & Regal
- Mandolin family brands include: Appalachian, Kentucky, Rover, & Trinity College.
- Banjo family brands include: Appalachian, Flinthill, Gold Star, Rover, & Saga.
- Violin family brands include: Anton Breton, Appalachian, Cervina, Cremona, & Recital Instruments
- Ukulele family brands include: Hamano, & Diamond Head
- Folk instrument brands include: Appalachian, Cusco, Schwartz, & Trinity College
