= Del Vecchio (guitar maker) =

Brazilian guitar manufacturer

Casa Del Vecchio Ltda.
- Company type: Private
- Industry: Musical instruments
- Founded: 1902; 123 years ago
- Founder: Angelo Del Vecchio
- Headquarters: São Paulo, Brazil
- Products: Classical and resonator guitars, banjos, mandolins, cavaquinhos, viola caipiras
- Website: delvecchio.com.br

Casa Del Vecchio Ltda. is a traditional guitarmaking company headquartered in São Paulo, Brazil. Since its foundation by Angelo Del Vecchio in 1902, it has produced a wide range of acoustic stringed instruments. In the 1930s, Del Vecchio began producing resonator guitars, resulting in their most famous model: the Dinâmico, (their trade term for resophonic instruments).

Current range of products manufactured by Del Vecchio includes classical and resonator guitars, banjos, mandolins, cavaquinho, and viola caipiras.

== Players ==
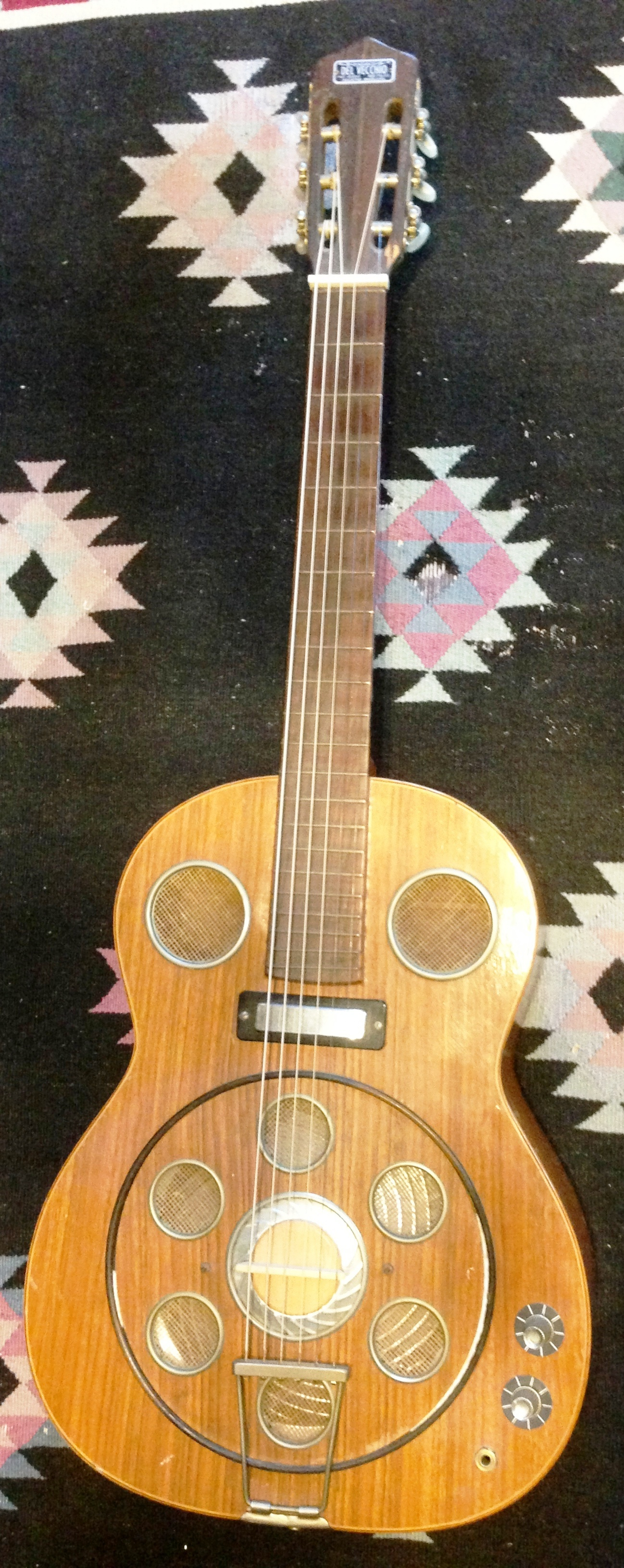
Dinâmico Resonator guitar model by Del Vecchio

One of the most famous players of the Del Vecchio Dinâmico resonator guitar was country musician Chet Atkins. Atkins was initially introduced to the instrument by the music of Nato Lima of Los Indios Tabajaras.

On his 1965 RCA Victor album My Favorite Guitars, Chet Atkins refers to his Dinamico as his "Los Indios Tabajaras" guitar and says that "the lead guitarist...sent his [to Atkins] and got himself another like it in his native land, where they are readily available." Tracks on the album, where Atkins uses the Dynamico, are Josephine and Moon of Manakoora.

Chet Atkins is credited with playing a Del Vecchio lead guitar on the tune "Turn Around" on Nanci Griffith's Other Voices, Other Rooms. Earl Klugh, a protégé of Chet Atkins, received a Dinâmico from Atkins. Though he enjoyed the sound, he was unimpressed with the quality, eventually asking luthier Paul McGill to build him a refined version.

- Leo Kottke also played a Dinâmico, which happened to be sitting in the studio. He played it for its unique sound on the track The Grid on his 2005 Sixty Six Steps.

== Offshoots ==
- Paul McGill builds resonator guitars inspired by the Dinâmico design
- The Japanese guitar company Shaftesbury produced a copy of the Dinâmico in the 1970s.
