= National String Instrument Corporation =

Defunct American musical instrument manufacturer

National String Instrument Corp.
- Company type: Private
- Industry: Musical instruments
- Founded: 1927 in Los Angeles, California, United States
- Founder: John Dopyera; George Beauchamp
- Defunct: 1932; 94 years ago (merged with Dobro)
- Fate: Merged with Dobro, company then acquired by Valco
- Headquarters: Los Angeles, California, United States
- Products: Resonator guitars, resonator mandolins, resonator ukuleles

The National String Instrument Corporation was an American guitar company first formed to manufacture banjos and then the original resonator guitars. National also produced resonator ukuleles and resonator mandolins. The company merged with Dobro to form the "National Dobro Company", then becoming a brand of Valco until it closed in 1968.

== History ==
=== Early years ===
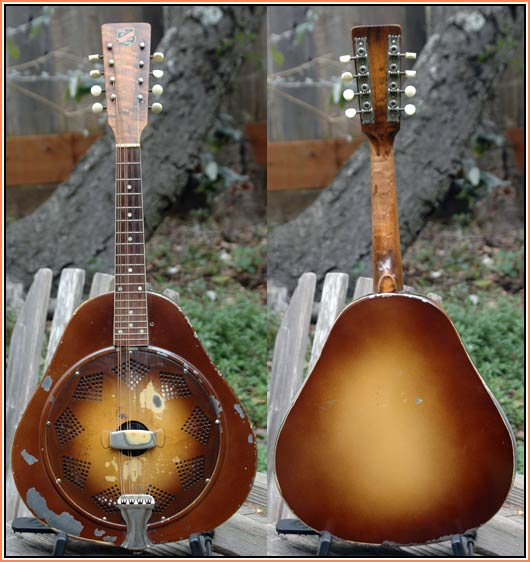
1930 National Triolian resonator mandolin

The first company was formed by George Beauchamp, a vaudeville steel guitar player and house painter, and inventor John Dopyera, a violinist and luthier.

Dopyera had seen an amplified Stroh stick violin nearby with a small flat diaphragm and long attached horn. He used that initial idea, but with a large spun conical inverted speaker, to create his patented multiple resonator designs.

Dopyera was assisted with his nephews Paul and Carl Barth spinning the first aluminum diaphragms on wooden bucks. They first experimented with their novel ampli-phonic design in a large walnut console instrument. Soon afterwards the first German silver Hawaiian guitar was built by John and Rudolph Dopyera. This guitar, #101, was later modified with a mahogany Spanish neck for regular guitar playing.

Beauchamp had suggested to Dopyera the need for a guitar loud enough to play a melody over brass and other wind instruments.

In 1927, National produced the first resonator instruments and sold them under their National brand. They had metal bodies and a tricone resonator system, with three aluminium cones joined by a T-shaped aluminium spider.

Brother Rudolph Dopyera, who previously worked with Weissenborne, hand built the original tri-cone models with diamond holes, prior to the second production stamped metal bodies by engineer Adolph Rickenbacher. They built metal resophonic mandolins, tenor guitars and ukuleles, some of which were ornately engraved with rose, lily of the valley and chrysanthemum designs.

Wooden-bodied Triolian and Trojan single resonator models eventually followed once the Dopyera brothers departed, based on inexpensive plywood student guitar bodies supplied by Kay, Harmony, and other established instrument manufacturers.

=== Dobro ===
In 1928, Dopyera left National, and with four of his brothers formed the Dobro Manufacturing Company to produce a competing single resonator design, with the resonator cone inverted. John Dopyera continued to hold stock in National. The Dobro design was both cheaper to produce and louder than the tricone.

National soon introduced their own single resonator design, the "biscuit", which Dopyera claimed to have designed before leaving, though the patent was registered by Beauchamp. National also continued to produce tricone designs, which some players preferred.

In their 1930 catalog, National list eight key associates, including Adolph Rickenbacker, George Beauchamp, Harry Watson, Paul Barth, and Jack Levy.

In 1932, the Dopyera brothers secured a controlling interest in both National and Dobro, and merged the companies to form the "National Dobro Corporation".

== Resonator guitar designs ==
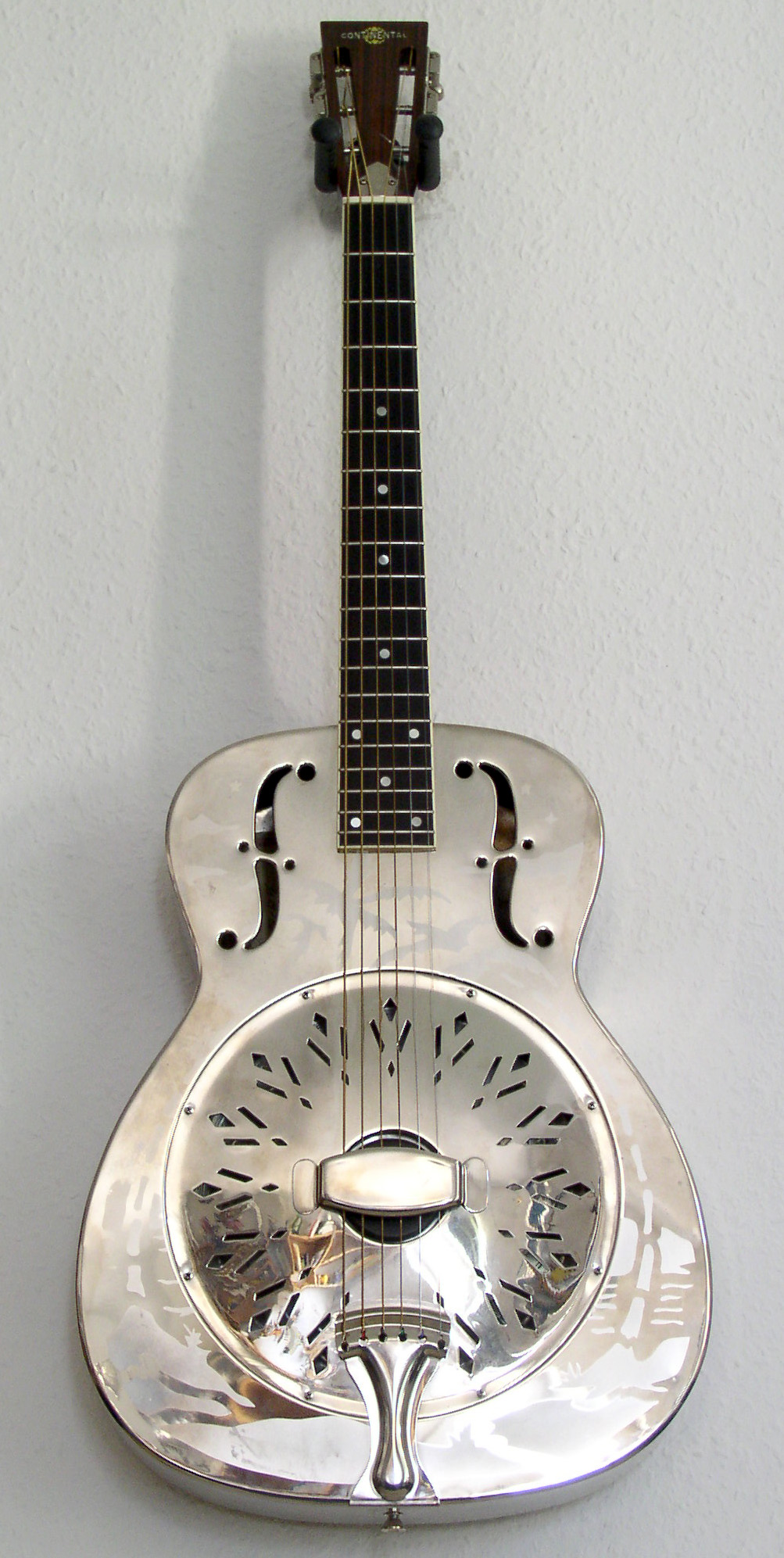
A resonator guitar.

The National brand and trademark are particularly associated with two of the three basic resonator designs:

- The tricone design with three resonator cones
- The biscuit design with a single cone

Terms such as National or National pattern are often used to distinguish these patterns from the Dobro design.

== Notable artists ==
Artists associated with National guitars include:

Son House used National resonator guitars

- Johnny Winter
- John Kay
- Black Ace
- Scrapper Blackwell
- Bumble Bee Slim
- Bo Carter
- Ray Davies
- Reverend Gary Davis
- Blind Boy Fuller
- Arvella Gray
- Son House
- David Lindley
- Mark Knopfler
- Babe Stovall
- Tampa Red
- Bukka White
- Bob Brozman
- Sol Hoopii
- Chris Whitley
- Oscar "Buddy" Woods
- Dan Auerbach
- Reverend J. Peyton
- Tinsley Ellis
- Sid Griffin

== See also ==
- National Reso-Phonic Guitars
