= John Dopyera =

Slovak-American inventor and entrepreneur (1893–1988)

- Born: Ján Dopjera; July 6, 1893; Šaštín-Stráže, Austria-Hungary
- Died: January 3, 1988 (aged 94); Grants Pass, Oregon, U.S.
- Occupations: Inventor and Entrepreneur
- Years active: 1926–1988

John Dopyera (Slovak: Ján Dopjera; 1893–1988) was a Slovak-American inventor, entrepreneur, and maker of stringed instruments. His inventions included the resonator guitar and important contributions to the early development of the electric guitar.

== Early life ==
John Dopyera was one of ten siblings born at the close of the 19th century. His father, Jozef Dopyera, was a miller in Dolná Krupá, Slovakia, to which they had moved shortly after Dopyera's birth. A gifted musician, Jozef constructed his own violins, which were popular in Slovakia for their craftsmanship. Under his father's tutelage, Dopyera built his first fiddle while still a young boy. In 1908, concerned that war was imminent in Europe, the Dopyeras emigrated to California. In the 1920s, Dopyera opened a stringed instrument shop in Los Angeles, where he built and repaired fiddles, banjos, and other wood stringed instruments. Around this time, Dopyera patented several improvements to banjo construction.

== Middle years ==
In 1925, Dopyera was asked by vaudeville instrumentalist (and, later, pioneer developer of electrically amplified instruments) George Beauchamp to create a guitar that could be heard over other instruments played in ensemble. Dopyera invented a guitar with three aluminum cones called resonators (similar to diaphragms inside a speaker) mounted beneath the bridge, this producing a sound much louder than ordinary acoustic guitars, along with a bright metallic tone. Dopyera, and his brothers Rudy and Emil, along with other investors, founded the National String Instrument Corporation to manufacture this new type of "resophonic" guitar, which was sold mainly to musicians working in cinemas and jazz clubs. Several years later, the brothers left the corporation to start their own company, Dobro, the name they also gave to the instrument, a portmanteau of 'Do', from Dopyera, and 'bro', from brothers. In a felicitous coincidence of language, 'dobro' means 'good' or 'goodness' in Slovak, and their slogan was: Dobro means good in any language!

== Later years ==
In 1932, working together with Art Stimson, Dopyera invented a new type of guitar design later recognized as the first industrially produced electrified Spanish guitar. Dopyera also invented a string-gripping device for acoustic guitars, the forebear of the one used on all guitars today. Dopyera's later patents included resophonic additions to nearly every string instrument, continued patents for the designs of banjos and violins, including the unique Dopera Bantar, which was a cross between the 5-string Banjo and 6-string Guitar. Dopera Bantars, though extremely rare, were used by a few influential performing artists of the 1960s, including Bob Dylan. At this time, Dopyera dropped the 'Y' from his name, considering the simpler spelling easier for the public to understand and pronounce. A patent for an electric violin was also registered around this time. In 1961, the brothers patented the Zorko bass, and sold the design to Ampeg, which produced the Baby Bass from 1962 to 1970. Dopyera's brothers later moved to Chicago, where they made millions of dollars working with the Valco music company and other business interests, while Dopyera chose to remain in Los Angeles and continue making instruments. Dopyera never attained great wealth, and was notable only among a small circle of people who knew he was the inventor of the resonator/resophonic guitar. He died in 1988 at the age of 94, having registered some 40 patents.

== Legacy ==
The Dobro resonator guitar was fundamental to the evolution of bluegrass music. The design crossed musical boundaries, proving equally at home in folk, rock, country, blues and jazz. In 1992, Slovak blues guitarist Peter Radványi co-founded the Dobrofestival in western Slovakia's Trnava, a week-long gathering of resophonic guitar enthusiasts, including some of the best bluegrass, blues, and Hawaiian guitar players in the world. The last Dobrofest was held in August, 2026. There is a small museum in Trnava called the Dobro Hall of Fame.

== See also ==
- Dobro
