= Dobro =

American guitar brand

Dobro Manufacturing Company
- Type: Private (1928–1937); Brand (1940–present)
- Industry: Musical instruments
- Founded: 1928
- Founder: John Dopyera
- Fate: Merged with National to form "National Dobro Co." in 1935, brand then used by Valco and other manufacturers
- Headquarters: United States
- Products: Resonator guitars
- Owner: Gibson (1993–present)

Dobro (/doʊbroʊ/) is an American brand of resonator guitars owned by Gibson and manufactured by its subsidiary Epiphone. The term "dobro" is also used as a generic term for any wood-bodied, single-cone resonator guitar.

The Dobro was originally a guitar manufacturing company founded by the Dopyera brothers as the Dobro Manufacturing Company. Their guitar design, with a single outward-facing resonator cone, was introduced to compete with the patented inward-facing tricone and biscuit designs produced by the National String Instrument Corporation. The Dobro name appeared on other instruments, notably electric lap steel guitars and solid body electric guitars and on other resonator instruments such as Safari resonator mandolins.

== History ==
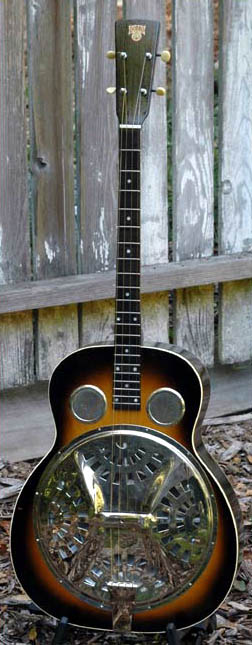
Dobro–style tenor guitar, 1934

The roots of the Dobro story can be traced to the 1920s when Slovak immigrant John Dopyera, instrument repairman and inventor, and musician George Beauchamp were searching for more volume for Beauchamp's guitars. Dopyera built an ampliphonic (or "resonator") for Beauchamp, which was patented in December 1929. In mid-1929, Dopyera left the National String Instrument Corporation to start the Dobro Manufacturing Company along with his brothers Rudy and Ed, and Vic Smith. National continued operating under Beauchamp, Barth et al. Dobro is both a contraction of 'Dopyera brothers' and a word meaning 'good' in their native Slovak and in many other Slavic languages. An early company motto was "Dobro means good in any language." In 1930, the Dobro company name was changed to Dobro Corporation, Ltd., with additional capital provided by Louis and Robert Dopyera. Dobro was, during this period, a competitor of National.

The Dobro was the third resonator guitar design by Dopyera, but the second to enter production. Unlike his earlier tricone design, which had three ganged inward-facing resonator cones, the Dobro had a single outward-facing cone, with its concave surface facing up. The Dobro company described this as a bowl-shaped resonator.

The Dobro was louder than the tricone and cheaper to produce. In Dopyera's opinion, the cost of manufacture had priced the resonator guitar beyond the reach of many players. His failure to convince his fellow directors at National String Instrument Corporation to produce a single-cone version was a motivating factor for leaving.

Since National had applied for a patent on an inward-facing single cone (US patent 1808756), Dopyera developed a design that reversed its direction: the guitar's bridge rested on an eight-legged cast aluminum spider sitting on the perimeter of the cone (US patent 1896484), rather than on the apex of the cone as it did in the National design.

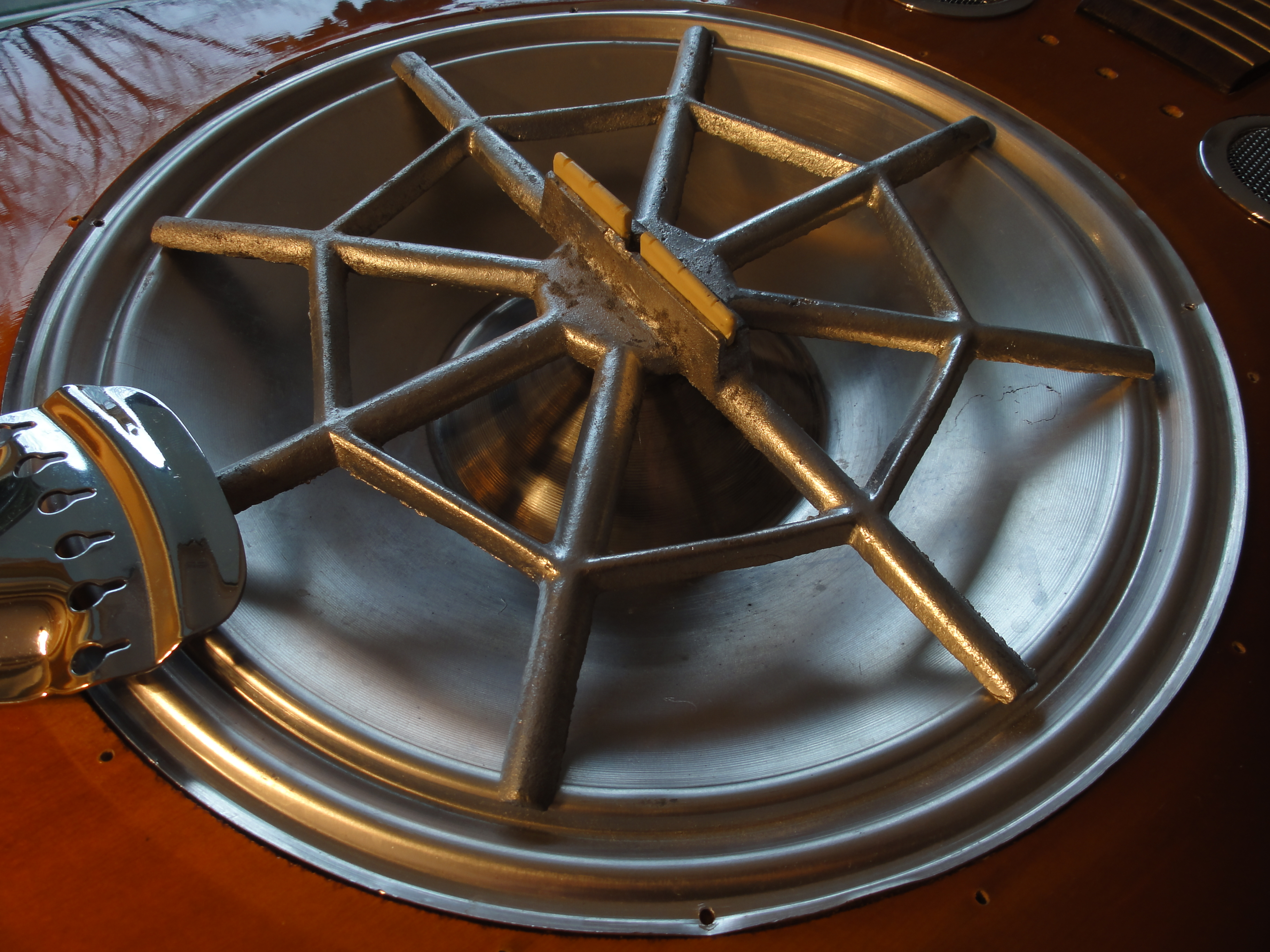
"Spider"-shape resonator detail

In the following years, both Dobro and National built a wide variety of metal- and wood-bodied single-cone guitars, while National also continued with the tricone for a time. Both companies sourced many components from National director Adolph Rickenbacher, and John Dopyera remained a major shareholder in National. By 1932, the Dopyera brothers had gained control of both National and Dobro, which they merged to form the National-Dobro Company. By the 1940s, National-Dobro had been purchased by Valco. Valco ceased production of Dobro-branded guitars after World War II; however, the Dopyera brothers continued to manufacture resonator guitars under various other brand names.

In 1964, the Dopyera brothers revived the Dobro brand name. They sold the name to Semie Moseley in 1966. In 1970, the Dopyeras' Original Musical Instrument Company (OMI) yet again reacquired the Dobro name. In 1993, the Gibson Guitar Corporation acquired OMI along with the Dobro name. The company became Gibson's Original Acoustic Instruments division, and production was moved to Nashville in 2000. As of February 2012, Dobros were manufactured by Gibson subsidiary Epiphone. As of January 2023, Dobros were not listed on Epiphone's website.

The Dobro was first introduced to country music by Bashful Brother Oswald, who played dobro with Roy Acuff starting in January 1939.

The first and second prototypes of the Dobro created by the brothers reside at the invention's birthplace of Taft, California, in a museum about the town's oil production history.

On June 19, 2019, a 1933 Dobro Resonator Guitar Model 27, owned by David Gilmour, was sold at auction for a record $112,500.

== Epiphone Dobros ==
Existing and past models of resonator guitars manufactured by the Gibson Company are:

- Hound Dog
  - Round neck
  - Deluxe round neck
  - Deluxe square neck
  - M-14 metal body
- Gibson's Phil Leadbetter resonator series
