= Joaquin Murphey =

American lap steel guitarist (1923–1999)

Earl James "Joaquin" Murphey (often spelled "Murphy", 30 December 1923 in Hollywood, California – 25 October 1999) was an American lap steel guitarist. Nicknamed "Joaquin" by bandleader Spade Cooley to refer to the San Joaquin Valley, Murphey was the cutting edge lap steel guitarist of his time due to his clean legato playing and innovative chordal style. He was discovered by Cooley in 1943 and was a member of Cooley's organization on and off for the next decade. He also worked with Tex Williams and the Western Caravan, a band formed in 1946 by Cooley's former vocalist and a number of his musicians. Murphey also recorded with the western band Andy Parker and the Plainsmen. Music historian Andy Volk described Murphey as "a jazz musician disguised as a cowboy".

He had a long-lasting friendship with inventor and guitar hardware manufacturer Paul Bigsby, who custom-built at least three steel guitars for him (including a double-neck lap steel, an early pedal steel, and a three-neck console model).

Murphey also recorded with various West Coast western swing and honky-tonk acts (Jimmie Widener, Johnny Bond, Smokey Rogers and many more) but seldom recorded on his behalf.

In 1980, he was inducted into the Steel Guitar Hall of Fame

His contemporaries included Herb Remington, Leon McAuliffe, Noel Boggs and Speedy West.

Many steel guitarists such as West and Buddy Emmons claimed Murphey as their main influence and mentor.

- 1947 steel guitar custom-built by Paul Bigsby
