= Steel Guitar Hall of Fame =

American organization

The Steel Guitar Hall of Fame is an organization established in the United States in 1978 to recognize achievement in the art of playing the steel guitar. The organization's stated purpose is:

To establish a Hall of Fame and Museum to support the art, popularity, and prestige of the steel guitar, to honor those musicians and composers who have made significant contributions to the steel guitar world, and to educate the public regarding the steel guitar.

In 1984, the organization was incorporated as a nonprofit organization in St. Louis, Missouri. When the Hall of Fame award was initiated in 1978, the awarding body's title was established as the "Steel Guitar Convention Board." For the first nine years of the awarding activity, board members themselves donated the funds to cover the awards. It was not until 1987 that sufficient funds were first raised to cover the annual awards costs. This was derived from individual contributors, from sanctioned benefit shows, and from funds raised at the annual International Steel Guitar Convention in St. Louis.

The idea of a hall of fame was first proposed by Nashville steel guitarist Jim Vest in the early 1970s. Vest intended to develop it, but his recording session work did not allow the time. By mutual agreement, Dewitt Scott took the responsibility and inaugurated the Hall of Fame in St. Louis in 1978. Scott is one of the founders who, for over 40 years conducted an annual international steel guitar convention featuring a fund-raising concert for the organization by renowned guitarists. One and sometimes two members are inducted annually. One plaque is forged for each inductee, and the plaques were displayed in St. Louis' Millennium Hotel as a temporary site until the hotel closed in 2013, after which they were placed in storage. A smaller replica is given to each inductee. The plaques were cast by sculptor Chris Unterseher in bronze bas-relief, depicting a likeness of the inductee followed by a brief résumé of his accomplishments. The text on each plaque was written by Tom Bradshaw. The organization contains inductees from outside the U.S. and is sometimes referred to as the "International Steel Guitar Hall of Fame" to distinguish it from various regional associations.

The first woman to become a member was Barbara Mandrell in 2009 An ongoing goal of the hall of fame is to secure a permanent museum site to display artifacts and plaques.

== Inductees ==
- 1978 — Jerry Byrd
- 1978 — Leon McAuliffe
- 1978 — Alvino Rey
- 1979 — Herb Remington
- 1979 — Sol Hoopii
- 1980 — Joaquin Murphey
- 1980 — Speedy West
- 1981 — Noel Boggs
- 1981 — Buddy Emmons
- 1982 — Jimmy Day
- 1982 — Dick Kaihue McIntire
- 1983 — Eddie Alkire
- 1983 — Ralph Mooney
- 1984 — Don Helms
- 1984 — Bud Isaacs
- 1985 — "Little" Roy Wiggins
- 1985 — Curly Chalker
- 1986 — Harold "Shot" Jackson
- 1987 — Pete Drake
- 1988 — Lloyd Green
- 1989 — Billy Bowman
- 1989 — Hal Rugg
- 1990 — Bob White
- 1990 — David Kelii
- 1991 — Zane Beck
- 1992 — Tom Brumley
- 1992 — Dewitt Scott
- 1992 — Bob Dunn
- 1993 — Joseph Kekuku
- 1993 — Buddy Charleton
- 1994 — Doug Jernigan
- 1995 — Freddie Tavares
- 1995 — Bobby Garrett
- 1996 — John Hughey
- 1997 — Al Perkins
- 1997 — Weldon Myrick
- 1998 — Johnny Sibert
- 1999 — Barney Alvin Kalanikau Isaacs Jr
- 1999 — Jeff Newman
- 2000 — Jimmie Crawford
- 2000 — Paul Franklin
- 2001 — Tom Morrell
- 2001 — Herbie Wallace
- 2002 — "Pee Wee" Whitewing
- 2002 — Santo & Johnny Farina
- 2003 — Walter Haynes
- 2003 — JayDee Maness
- 2004 — Bobby Koefer
- 2004 — Jody Carver
- 2004 — Bobby Black
- 2005 — Orville "Red" Rhodes
- 2005 — Leonard T. Zinn
- 2006 — Rico Turchetti
- 2006 — Tom Bradshaw
- 2006 — Maurice Anderson
- 2007 — "Sneaky" Pete Kleinow
- 2007 — Roy Ayres
- 2008 — Julian Tharpe
- 2008 — Norm Hamlett
- 2008 — Don Warden
- 2009 — Bud Carter
- 2009 — Barbara Mandrell
- 2009 — Ron Elliott
- 2010 — Winnie Winston
- 2010 — Bobby Caldwell
- 2010 — Dick Overby
- 2011 — Bobbe Seymour
- 2011 — Larry Sasser
- 2011 — Russ Hicks
- 2012 — Terry Bethel
- 2012 — Kayton Roberts
- 2013 — Rusty Young
- 2013 — Tommy White
- 2013 — Lynn Owsley
- 2014 — Joe Wright
- 2014 — Sonny Garrish
- 2014 — Jim Vest
- 2015 — Gene Fields
- 2015 — Chubby Howard
- 2016 — Del Mullen
- 2016 — Neil Flanz
- 2026 — Junior Brown
- 2026 — Lucky Oceans
- 2026 — David "Feet" Rogers
