= Elbern Alkire =

America's most recognized performer, teacher, and innovator

Elbern H. "Eddie" Alkire (December 6, 1907 – January 25, 1981) was America's most recognized performer, teacher, and innovator of the 20th century Hawaiian guitar.

== Early life and education ==
Alkire was born in rural West Virginia on December 6, 1907, and grew up in Easton, Pennsylvania, where he attended and graduated from Easton Area High School in Easton and then Lafayette College, also in Easton.

== Career ==
Alkire utilized his skills as a guitarist and musician to become a teacher and composer for Oahu Music Company in October 1929 after traveling to Pittsburgh to study electrical machines as an employee for a West Virginia coal company. He became music director for the Oahu Serenaders, which performed on over 1,000 coast-to-coast broadcasts for NBC and CBS that aired from Cleveland, Ohio, during the first years of network radio.

In 1934, Alkire relocated to Easton, Pennsylvania, where he started his own company, publishing music and teaching guitar. He utilized his knowledge of electricity to create the first 10-string electric Hawaiian guitar and his music background to create new tunings that enabled him to play four-part harmonies and rapid melodic passages that became the hallmark of his new style of performance.

In 1983, he was inducted into the Steel Guitar Hall of Fame.

A collection of Alkire's original and published music, correspondence, and musical instruments, including four prototype Hawaiian guitars is housed at the Sousa Archives and Center for American Music at the University of Illinois at Urbana-Champaign.
