= Oahu Music Company =

American music education company

Oahu Music Company (Oahu Publishing Company)
- Industry: Musical instruments, instruction and publishing
- Founded: 1926 in Flint, Michigan, U.S.
- Founders: Harry G. Stanley and George Bronson
- Defunct: 1985
- Headquarters: Cleveland, Ohio, U.S.
- Area served: International
- Products: Steel guitars, Spanish guitars, accordions, amplifiers, music, music instruction, music publications, music accessories

The Oahu Music Company was a music education program in the United States during the 1930s and 1940s to teach students to play the Hawaiian Guitar. Popular culture in America became fascinated with Hawaiian music during the first half of the twentieth century and in 1916, recordings of indigenous Hawaiian instruments outsold every other genre of music in the U.S. By 1920, sales of Hawaiian guitars and instruction had become well established and Oahu Music Company was the leading purveyor of these programs. The organization canvassed nearly every city in the United States, often door-to-door, selling both their Oahu-brand instruments and lessons for young people to join their weekly classes.

Oahu Music was founded in Flint, Michigan in 1926 by Harry G. Stanley and his half-brother George Bronson. The two men later parted ways and Stanley became sole owner. In the Great Depression of the 1930s, many Americans had little money to spend on extra items such as musical instruments, but acoustic steel guitars were available for the relatively low price of seven dollars, including case, bar, picks, nut adapter, and lessons. The company thrived even through the worst of the depression.

== Harry G. Stanley ==
Oahu's founder, Harry Stanley had a flair for showmanship. In 1930, he rented space in a nice area of Cleveland and announced the opening of the Oahu school with heavy advertising promotion. "People lined up for blocks to sign up for his programs", said music historian Lorene Ruymar. He soon branched out into publishing as well as manufacturing his own brand of instruments. He chose to use the name Oahu Publishing Company on his musical instruments. He encouraged his brightest students to purchase franchises for Oahu-owned studios under the name of "Honolulu Conservatory of Music", eventually supplying 1200 teaching studios in the U.S. and Canada. Stanley sold his dealers nearly everything for the studios, including instruments, cases, music, strings, picks, bars, amplifiers and even folding chairs. The company remained profitable even in hard economic times.

Eddie Alkire was a well-known guitarist who taught for the Oahu Music Company in 1929. Born in West Virginia, Alkire himself had learned to play steel guitar from a correspondence course. By 1930 he was persuaded to move to Cleveland, hired by the Oahu Company as a teacher and composer. Alkire performed a nationwide NBC and CBS show of Hawaiian music with the Oahu Serenaders broadcast from Cleveland.

The company published a magazine called "The Guitarist " in the late 1930s which was sent to their mail order students worldwide. The name was later changed to "Music Magazine ". It was largely a promotional tool to keep students interested, but also an advertising means for Oahu products. The company sold guitars, amplifiers, sheet music, and accessories Their acoustic Oahu-brand instruments were made for them by several manufacturers including Kay (Harmony, Valco) and Rickenbacker. However, the company's electric lap steel models (with amplifiers) were made in-house by Oahu technicians. In 1950, accordion teaching programs were added to the company's offerings, along with Oahu's own brand of accordions imported from Italy. Harry Stanley died of a heart attack in 1970. His wife managed the company until it closed in 1985.

== Notable former students ==
One of Oahu's young pupils in the 1930s was Herb Remington, who became a noted steel guitarist for Bob Wills and the Texas Playboys. Remington took lessons from the company as a child in South Bend, Indiana. He took sixty lessons from Oahu and was taught using a number system. Remington said, "You don't learn notes, but if you have an ear, you can take off from there." He recalled a 1941 music festival that included 1500 children in Oahu's program from a three or four state area to play a steel guitar recital including "Stars and Stripes Forever" at Chicago's Soldier Field. Remington was one of Western swing's most popular steel guitarists and was inducted into the Steel Guitar Hall of Fame.

Bud Isaacs was another hall of fame (1994) steel guitarist who took Oahu courses as a youth. Isaacs' mother enrolled him in Oahu's school located above the local confectionary in Bedford, Indiana about 1938. Isaacs did not care for the Hawaiian music he was being taught, preferring the jazzier Western swing music (and tunings) of Noel Boggs. Nevertheless, Isaacs persisted in his studies. He went on to perform professionally with country artists including Red Foley, Little Jimmy Dickens, and Chet Atkins on the road and in recording sessions. Isaacs made country music history in 1954 as the first person to play pedal steel guitar on a hit record.

Doug Jernigan a steel guitarist born in Pensacola, Florida, took lessons from Oahu as a youth in the late 1950s. He played country music on a lap steel, then went to pedal steel. He became a successful session musician in Nashville and branched out into jazz, making nine instrumental albums in both jazz and country genres. He is a frequent performer on the Grand Ole Opry and was inducted into the Steel Guitar Hall of Fame in 1994.

Lloyd Green is another Hall of Fame steel player who began with Oahu. In 1944 at age seven Green's family was told he was too young for Oahu lessons, the minimum age being fourteen. After a "test lesson" showed his aptitude, the rule was waived. Green played on thousands of country music recordings over a quarter-century beginning in the mid-1960s.

== Archival collections ==
The Wilma Ferrel Collection at California State University, Northridge contains hundreds of pieces of sheet music and guitar instructional material published by the Oahu Music Company. The collection also contains many examples of marketing materials from the company.
