= Bud Isaacs =

American pedal steel guitarist (1928–2016)

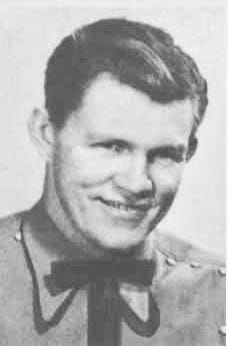

Background information
- Also known as: Bud Isaacs
- Born: Forrest Isaacs; March 26, 1928; Bedford, Indiana, U.S.
- Died: September 4, 2016 (aged 88) Yuma, Arizona
- Genres: Country
- Occupation: Musician
- Instrument: Pedal steel guitar
- Years active: 1942–2015
- Labels: RCA and others
- Formerly of: Red Foley, Little Jimmy Dickens, Chet Atkins, Webb Pierce

Forrest "Bud" Isaacs (1928–2016) was an American pedal steel guitarist notable for his early use of the instrument on Webb Pierce's 1954 recording of "Slowly", which became a major hit and one of the most-played country music songs of 1954. Isaacs was the first to push a pedal while the strings were still sounding to create a unique bending of notes from below up to join an existing note; this was not possible on older steel guitars. (Note: Theoretically, it was "possible" on a lap steel, but not possible to play it rapidly with perfect intonation; the pedal version was immediately recognizable.)

Isaacs performed professionally with numerous artists, including Red Foley, Little Jimmy Dickens and Chet Atkins on the road and in recording sessions. He became a member of the house bands at the Grand Ole Opry and the Ozark Jubilee. Isaacs was inducted into the Steel Guitar Hall of Fame in 1984.

== Early life ==
Isaacs was born March 26, 1928, in Bedford, Indiana. His father was a millworker at Bedford Cut Stone Company. His mother enrolled Isaacs in lessons provided by the Oahu Music Company located above Hoover's Confectionary in Bedford. Initially he played a conventional acoustic guitar Hawaiian style (horizontally across the knees) with raised strings. He persisted at the Hawaiian academy but preferred the lap steel style and tunings of Noel Boggs. With his acoustic guitar at age fourteen he performed with Pee Wee King's band on the Grand Ole Opry and was offered a job, (Note: At that time, many of Pee Wee King's orchestra members had been taken by the WWII draft; King was actively seeking new musicians. Judge George D. Hay auditioned Issacs for King and made the job offer.)but the offer was withdrawn when his true age was revealed.

At age sixteen he acquired a Gibson "Electraharp", one of the earliest commercially available designs of a steel guitar with pedals. He quit high school that year to become a professional musician. He made his radio debut on WIBC-AM in Indianapolis and in 1944 began traveling throughout the Midwest to perform on various barn dance shows. He worked in Texas, Arizona, Michigan and elsewhere during the following decade. With the Electraharp, he recorded the song "Big Blue Diamonds" for King Records. He worked for numerous artists in recording sessions and on the road and was a member of the house band of the Grand Ole Opry for many years. He recorded as a solo performer for RCA from 1954 to 1960. and created his much-copied "Bud's Bounce" and "The Waltz You Saved for Me".

== "Slowly" ==
After receiving a new custom pedal steel, a double neck eight-string, made by Paul Bigsby in 1952, Isaacs experimented with it, trying to imitate the sound of two fiddles playing in harmony. Bigsby's new steel guitar design featured a pedal mechanism which changed the pitch of two strings simultaneously. Isaacs was not the first to use pedals. Speedy West had been using a pedal steel since 1948; however, Isaacs was the first on a recording to push the pedal while notes were still sounding. Other steel players strictly avoided doing this, because it was considered "un-Hawaiian". On a Webb Pierce recording session in Nashville in November, 1953, producer Owen Bradley asked Isaacs to try his technique on a solo for the song "Slowly". The song became one of the most-played country songs of 1954 and was No. 1 on the Billboard's country charts for seventeen weeks. It was the first recording of a pedal steel guitar on a hit record. This single performance by a session musician produced a rare and unlikely stylistic overhaul of the steel guitar sound in Nashville-produced country music. Steel guitar virtuoso Lloyd Green said, "This fellow, Bud Isaacs, had thrown a new tool into musical thinking about the steel with the advent of this record that still reverberates to this day". Attempting to put Issacs' innovation into words, music historian Tim Sterner Miller described it:, "... two pitches changing in contrapuntal motion against a sustained common tone..." Not only was the song embraced by the public, it was immediately recognized by lap steel (non-pedal) guitarists as something unique that was not possible to achieve on their instruments. Now a favored session player, Isaacs performed on 11 top country records in 1955. In an interview in 2012 by Jon Rauhouse, Isaacs said, "I had the only pedaled steel in town at the time. I got sessions with everybody!" Dozens of instrumentalists rushed to get pedals on their steel guitars to imitate the unique bending notes that he played. In the months and years after this recording, instrument makers and musicians worked to recreate Bigsby's mechanical innovation and Isaacs' musical innovation. Even though pedal steel guitars had been available for over a decade before this recording, the instrument emerged as a crucial element in country music after the success of this song.

== Personal life ==
In 1956, the Gibson company hired Isaacs to consult on their pedal steel instrument, later introduced as the "Multiharp". Isaacs married Geri Mapes, also a musician, and they worked together with an act they called the "Golden West Singers". The couple eventually retired to Yuma, Arizona, where Isaacs died September 4, 2016 at the age of 88. He was inducted into the Steel Guitar Hall of Fame in 1984. Record companies issued three compilations of his recordings, Master of the Steel Guitar (2005), Swingin' Steel Guitar of Bud Isaacs (2005) and Bud's Bounce (2006).
