= Curly Chalker =

- Birth name: Harold Lee Chalker
- Born: October 22, 1931; Enterprise, Alabama
- Died: April 30, 1998 (aged 66); Hendersonville, Tennessee
- Genres: Country, gospel
- Occupation: Musician
- Instrument: Pedal steel guitar
- Years active: 1950s–1990s

Harold Lee Chalker (October 22, 1931 – April 30, 1998), known professionally as Curly Chalker, was an American pedal steel guitarist.

Born in Enterprise, Alabama, Chalker began playing the lap steel guitar while still in his teens and made his professional debut in the nightclubs of Cincinnati, Ohio.

== As a sideman ==
In the 1950s, Chalker was touring Texas with Lefty Frizzell, replacing C.B. White, and played on the Frizzell cuts, "Always Late (With Your Kisses)" and "Mom and Dad's Waltz" (both in 1951). Chalker played dobro on these recordings. Chalker then joined Hank Thompson's Brazos Valley Boys, and was featured on the 1952 cuts, "Cryin' in the Deep Blue Sea" and "The Wild Side of Life".

After two years in the US armed forces, Chalker joined the Springfield, Missouri-based Ozark Jubilee ABC Radio and TV series for several years, backing Red Foley and Porter Wagoner. During this time Chalker switched from the lap steel to the pedal steel guitar.

In 1959, he moved to Las Vegas, Nevada, where he played behind fiddler Wade Ray, and later joined the band of the long-time Golden Nugget fixture Hank Penny. Roy Clark (of Hee Haw fame) also played with Penny and the two became friends. Chalker relocated to Nashville in 1965, and became successful as a session musician.

== Solo work ==
In 1966, he made an instrumental album for Columbia Records entitled Big Hits on Big Steel. This record was produced by fellow steel guitarist Pete Drake. The follow-up release was More Ways to Play released in 1975. In 1976 he released an album consisting exclusively of Gordon Lightfoot covers, entitled Nashville Sundown.

Chalker also appeared with the Nashville Symphony Orchestra, recording the album, Counterpoint which was shelved for years after its completion.

== Collaborations ==
A prolific studio musician and sideman, Chalker performed on records and on stage with artists such as Willie Nelson, the Gap Band, Ray Price, Leon Russell, and Bill Haley and the Comets. One of his most notable collaborations was S'Wonderful (Four Giants of Swing) (1976), on which he collaborated with jazz violinist Joe Venuti, guitarist Eldon Shamblin and mandolinist Jethro Burns. On this album, the quartet played classic swing tunes by composers such as George Gershwin and Duke Ellington.

Chalker also appeared on work that was outside the country and Western and swing genres, including appearances on Simon and Garfunkel's 1969 hit "The Boxer" and Marie Osmond's "Paper Roses". Proving that he had a mind for the unconventional, Chalker also appeared on Chinga Chavin's 1976 album, Country Porn.

Chalker was also a member of the house band of the television show Hee Haw for 18 years, with his friend and former bandmate, Roy Clark.

In 1973, to meet the demands for low-maintenance and lighter amplifiers, Hartley Peavey sought Chalker's guidance, along with that of Buddy Emmons and other steel guitarists in developing the Session 400 amplifier, which went into production in 1974.

In 1985 he was inducted into the Steel Guitar Hall of Fame.

== Death and legacy ==
Chalker died on April 30, 1998, from a cancer-related brain tumor.

In 2009, he was honored by the Wiregrass Festival of Murals in Dothan, Alabama. His likeness is featured next to 16 other country music performers with ties to the Wiregrass Region on a mural in downtown Dothan. He is survived by his son Lee Jarane Chalker

== Personality ==
While Chalker earned a reputation both as an innovator and performer, he was also known for his quick temper and strong personality. Sometimes after onstage mistakes, he had a tendency to slam down his fretting bar and yell profanities, a habit that led bandleader Hank Thompson to remark:

I'd say, "If you make a mistake, you're probably the only one who notices it, and also, you don't have to say 'shit' with all the people standing around the bandstand." He was very inconsistent with his playing, but it seemed that when it was really important, he'd come through. On a record session, he'd play you some of the best stuff you ever heard, or some critical concert with a big audience, a lot of people on the show, he'd bear down and play the best you ever saw. Next night, we'd be playin' some club somewhere and hell, every other song he'd mess it up.

== Discography ==
- Big Hits on Big Steel (Columbia, 1966)
- More Ways to Play (Mid-Land, 1975)
- Nashville Sundown (GNP Crescendo, 1977
- S'Wonderful: Four Giants of Swing (Flying Fish, 1977) with Joe Venuti, Eldon Shamblin, and Jethro Burns
