= Hank Penny =

American country singer-songwriter (1918–1992)

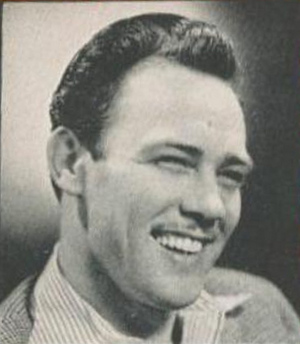

Background information
- Born: Herbert Clayton Penny; September 18, 1918; Birmingham, Alabama, U.S.
- Died: April 17, 1992 (aged 73) California
- Genres: Western swing, country
- Occupation: Musician
- Instrument: Banjo
- Years active: 1930s–1980s

Herbert Clayton Penny (September 18, 1918 – April 17, 1992) was an American musician who sang and played banjo mainly in the Western swing subgenre of country music. He blended country and western music with dixieland, swing, and most notably bebop jazz styles, earning the nickname “the king of hillbilly bebop”. He also worked as a comedian best known for his backwoods character "That Plain Ol' Country Boy" on TV with Spade Cooley. He was married to country singer Sue Thompson from 1953–63.

== Career ==
In the 1930s, Penny was the leader of the Radio Cowboys with guitarist Julian Akins, steel guitarist Sammy Forsmark, tenor banjoist Louis Dumont, bassist Carl Stewart, and vocalist, guitarist, and fiddler Sheldon Bennett. At WLW Radio in Cincinnati during World War II, he formed the Plantation Boys, which included fiddler Carl Stewart, guitarist/bassist Louis Innis, fiddler Zed Tennis, and lead guitarist Roy Lanham. Their sound was similar to that of the Radio Cowboys.

In 1944, Penny left Cincinnati for Los Angeles where he formed larger Western swing bands that played local clubs and ballrooms, such as the Venice Pier in Santa Monica. He took over a band formerly led by ex-Spade Cooley bassist Deuce Spriggens. Penny modeled the Radio Cowboys' repertoire of Western Swing music on Milton Brown and his Musical Brownies. His West Coast bands reflected the influence of both the more sophisticated Spade Cooley band, and Bob Wills and his Texas Playboys.

A number of former Wills sidemen such as Jimmy Wyble, Noel Boggs, and Herb Remington also worked with Penny. For a time in 1950, singer Jaye P. Morgan was part of his band 'The Penny Serenaders'.

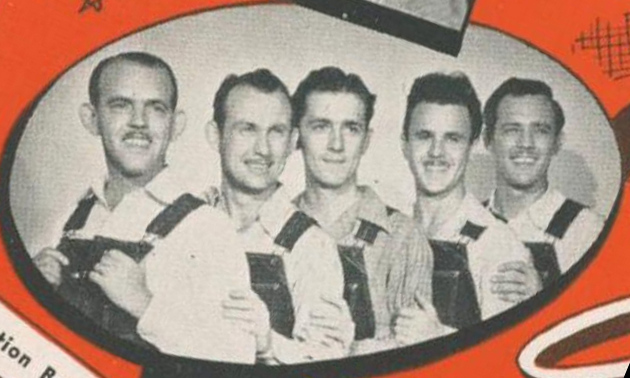
The Plantation Boys

Penny had three hits on the Billboard Country Singles chart: "Steel Guitar Stomp" (King 528, 1946), an instrumental that featured Noel Boggs and Merle Travis, the slightly risque "Get Yourself A Red Head" (King 540, 1946), and his own composition "Bloodshot Eyes" (King 828, 1950).

Penny's "Bloodshot Eyes," a country novelty number, was recorded in 1951 by rhythm and blues singer Wynonie Harris, who also recorded for King Records, Penny's label at the time. Harris recorded the song because the publishing was controlled by King, whose owner Syd Nathan encouraged his other artists to record songs he published. Harris' version of "Bloodshot Eyes" remained on the American R&B charts for three months. It was also popular in the Caribbean, where Harris had a large following. Along with other Wynonie Harris records, it was being played in Jamaican dance halls as early as 1951. In 1958, Jamaican mento group Denzil Laing and the Wrigglers recorded a version for their Arawak Hotel album, with guitarist Ernest Ranglin. Sydney Bean also recorded it, releasing it around 1955. In 1971, the song was a Top 40 regional hit in Detroit when it was recorded by the band 'Lucifer' for Invictus Records.

A lifelong fan of jazz, Penny recorded an instrumental "Hillbilly Be-Bop" (King 795, 1949). It was one of the first western swing numbers to incorporate bebop, the new sound in jazz. His bands included jazz sidemen such as guitarists Jimmy Wyble and Benny Garcia.

Along with Amand Gautier, Penny co-founded the Palomino Club in Hollywood in 1949. The club was open seven days a week. On Monday nights after closing time, it was "open stage" to west coast jazz musicians.

Penny was known for his unwillingness to compromise and occasionally combative attitude. He walked out on a 1945 engagement at Venice Pier when dance promoter Bert "Foreman" Phillips insisted Penny direct his musicians to quit playing improvisational jazz solos and stick to melodic instrumental passages in the style of conventional country singers such as Ernest Tubb or Roy Acuff. Phillips frequently booked Grand Ole Opry artists at his dancehalls, and did not personally care for the jazz elements of western swing. When Phillips demanded Penny fire Wyble, Boggs, and fiddler Harold Hensley for continuing to improvise, Penny just dissolved the band. He was also known to stand up to promoters and to King Records president Syd Nathan.

Penny's recordings for King included some of the finest musicians in western music, such as guitarists Wyble, Benny Garcia, and Roy Lanham, fiddlers Harold Hensley, Max Fidler, and Billy Hill (not the songwriter), and steel guitarists Noel Boggs, Joaquin Murphey, Ralph Miele, Speedy West, and Herb Remington. Many of Penny's sidemen also worked with Spade Cooley's band. For several years, starting in 1948, Penny was a member of the cast of Cooley's Saturday night television show over KTLA-TV in his guise as a country comedian ("That Plain Ol' Country Boy"), and seldom performed music on the show, even though he and his band played dances throughout the Los Angeles area. In 1952, Penny began hosting his own local Los Angeles TV series, The Hank Penny Show, which was canceled after seven weeks.

By 1954, Penny moved to Las Vegas, where he began a seven-year run as a performer at the Golden Nugget casino, fronting a band that included steel guitar virtuoso Curly Chalker and at the same time, Roy Clark, whose own comedy delivery was influenced considerably by Penny's onstage comic timing. Penny's band backed Clark on his first album for Capitol Records.

Penny made a 1970s appearance with Peggy Conner on America 2-Night, playing a country husband-and-wife singing duo called Buck and Harriet Pine.

== Personal life ==
Penny was born in Birmingham, Alabama, United States. He died in 1992 at his Southern California home of heart failure. He was the father of actress Sydney Penny and producer Greg Penny. Country music historian Rich Kienzle began researching and writing about Penny's career in the late 1970s, and devoted a chapter to him in his 2003 book Southwest Shuffle.

== Discography ==
- Hank Penny Sings (Audio Lab AL-1508, 1958)
- It's War Again! (Jazz War, That Is) (NRC LPA-7, 1959)
- The Hank Penny Show On Stage (Pen-Sound HP-100, 1967)
- Tobacco State Swing (Rambler RR-103, 1980)
- Hollywood Western Swing: The Best of Hank Penny 1944-1947 (Krazy Kat KK CD-25, 1999)
- Crazy Rhythm: The Standard Transcriptions (1951) (Bloodshot Revival BS-806, 2000)
- The Penny Opus #1 (Jasmine JASMCD-3520, 2000)
- Hillbilly Be-Bop: The King Anthology 1944-1950 (Westside WESA-914, 2001)
- King of Hillbilly Bebop (Proper PVCD-134 [2CD], 2003)
- Flamin' Mamie (1938-1941) (Krazy Kat KK CD-31, 2004)
