= Jackson Guldan Co. =

Company manufacturing stringed musical instruments

The Jackson-Guldan Co. of Columbus, Ohio was a manufacturer of stringed musical instruments, operating in the first half of the 20th century. Most notably, the company produced violins, fiddles, and violas as its primary product. The company also made acoustic guitars, most carrying the brand name Adjustomatic. The company also diversified by creating a toy department that, among other products, made toy violins for children.

== Company History ==
The Jackson-Guldan factory was located at 165 Main Street West. It was a brick building, three stories tall, with a one-story wing. The company was in operation from 1915 to 1971. George J. Guldan was one of the company's founders and served as the original superintendent. The earliest known published reference to the company appears in the 30 December 1916 issue of the Music Trade Review. It was one of the first American companies to use machine fabrication for certain musical instrument components such as the front, back, and scroll. During the company's early history their primary customers were for-profit music schools.

Originally known as the Jackson-Guldan Violin Co., the company changed its name to Jackson-Guldan, Inc. in 1954 after the company was purchased by F. L. Daniel of Chicago. At the time of the purchase the company had been in decline, with only five employees remaining. After the purchase the factory was modernized, raw material supply was increased, a new employee training program was established, and the company was expanded to 38 employees. In 1956 the company began to petition the U.S. federal government to increase import tariffs on foreign-made violins which undercut the pricing of Jackson Guldan products and had been leading, in part, to the company's and the industry's slow decline up to that point. At the time of its closure, it was the last remaining violin manufacturer in the United States.

== Violins ==
Most current references to the Jackson Guldan Co. relate either to its violins or guitars. The company proudly displayed its workmanship with banners such as Made in America by Jackson Guldan Craftsmen, or Made in America by Jackson Guldan Co., Columbus, Ohio, Inspected & Guaranteed. The violins were its best product, and many are still on the second-hand market. They are considered workmanlike, designed for everyday use, and often sounding better than their construction would indicate.

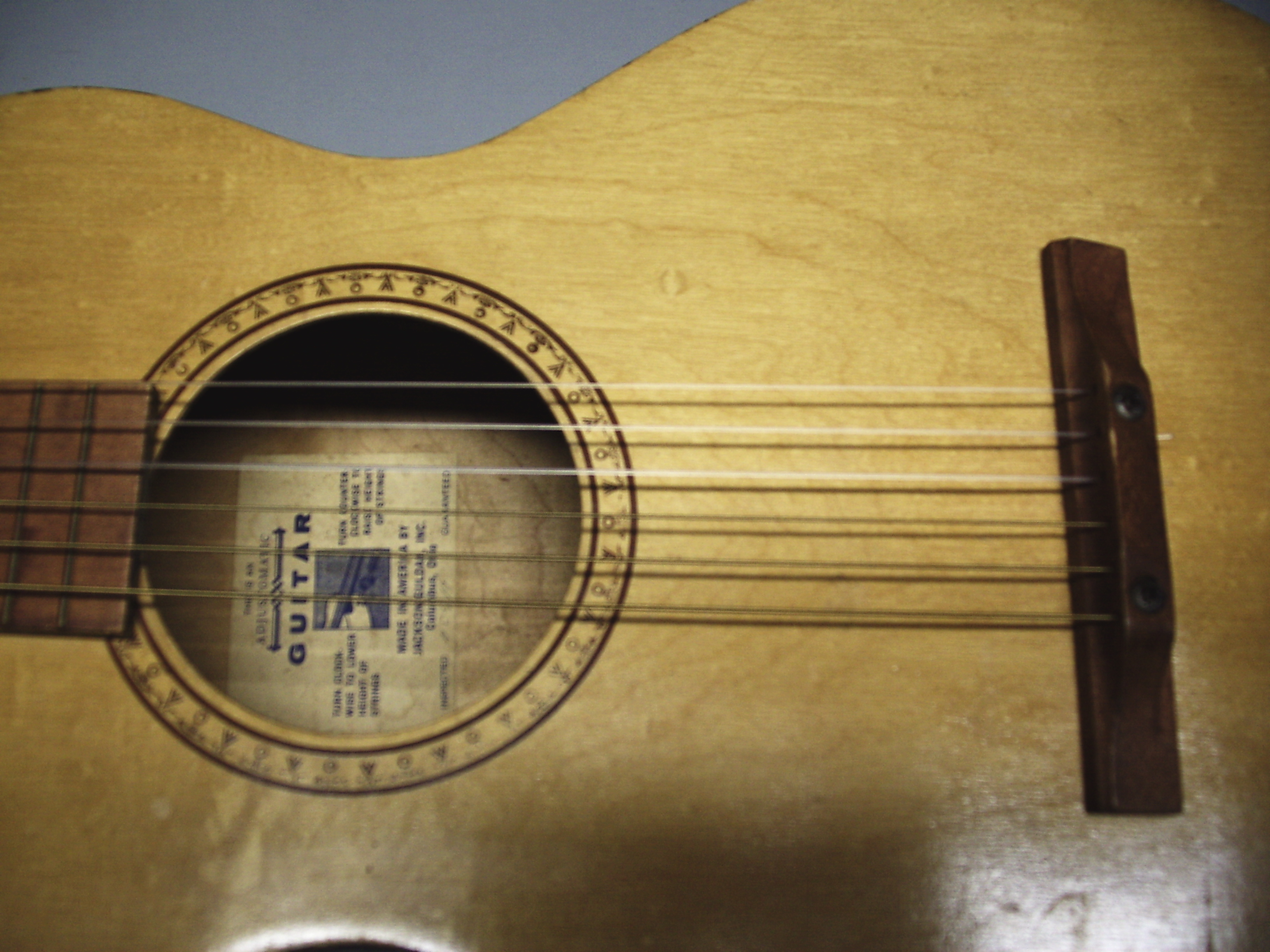
Factory label inside the soundhole of a Jackson Guldan guitar.

== Adjustomatic Acoustic Guitars ==
Most Jackson-Guldan acoustic guitars on the second-hand market are under various names such as Blue Suede, Chris, Dart, and Hootenanny. The company also made branded guitars for the Oahu Music Company. Many carry the Adjustomatic label, indicating that the neck and bridge are user adjustable for player comfort. A threaded bolt turns against a small piece of 90-degree angle iron to allow the musician to easily adjust the string action, that is, the closeness of the strings to the fretboard on the neck. The guitar can also be disassembled and reassembled by fully unscrewing the aforementioned bolt with the use of a simple screwdriver or ratcheting socket wrench.

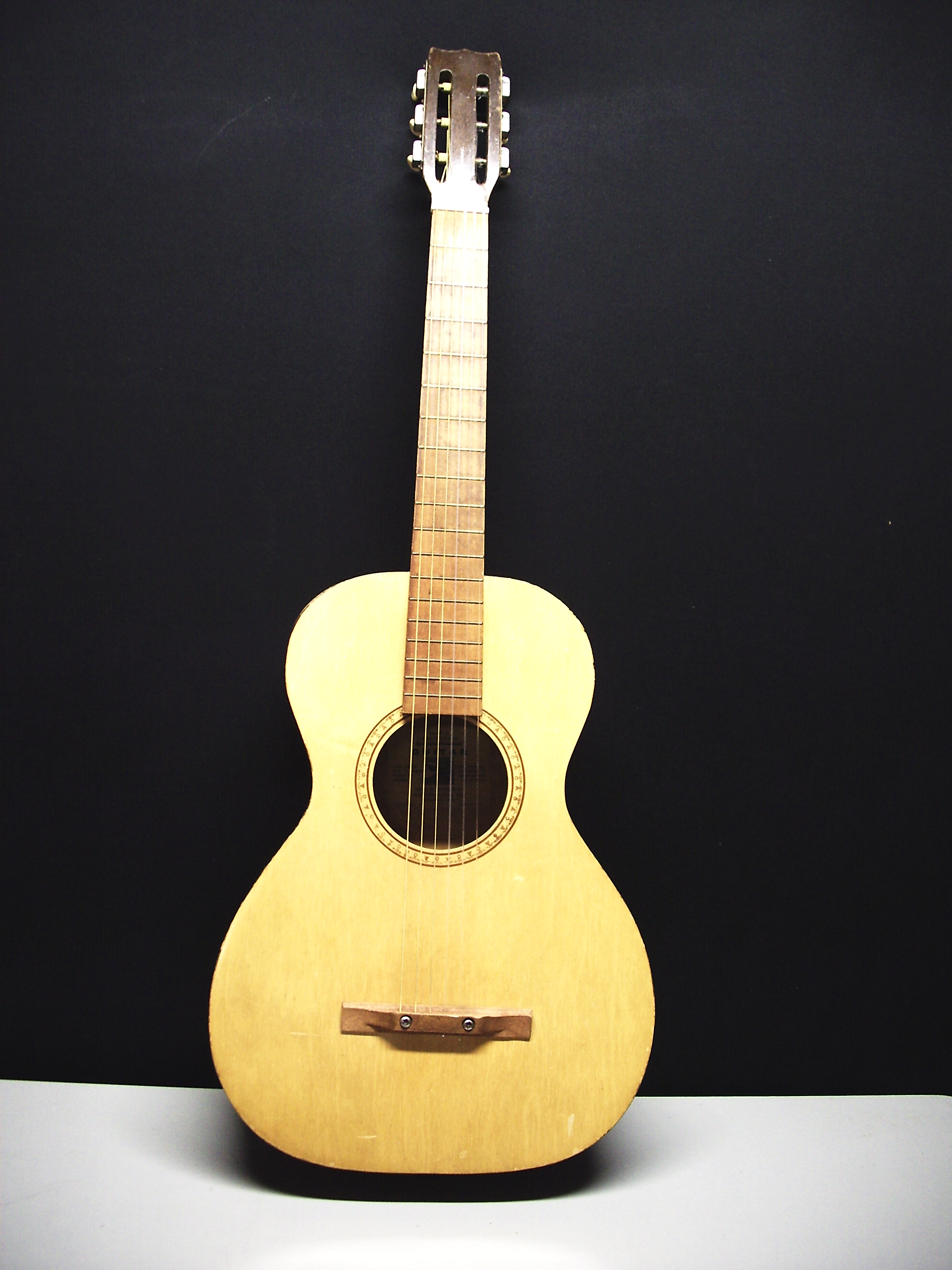
Jackson Guldan Adjustomatic Guitar.

The Adjustomatic guitars measure 36 inches long, which puts them in the Parlor Guitar category.

In the 1950s, during the Rockabilly heyday, the company made an acoustic guitar called the Blue Suede, that is markedly more refined than the Chris and Dart Adjustomatics.

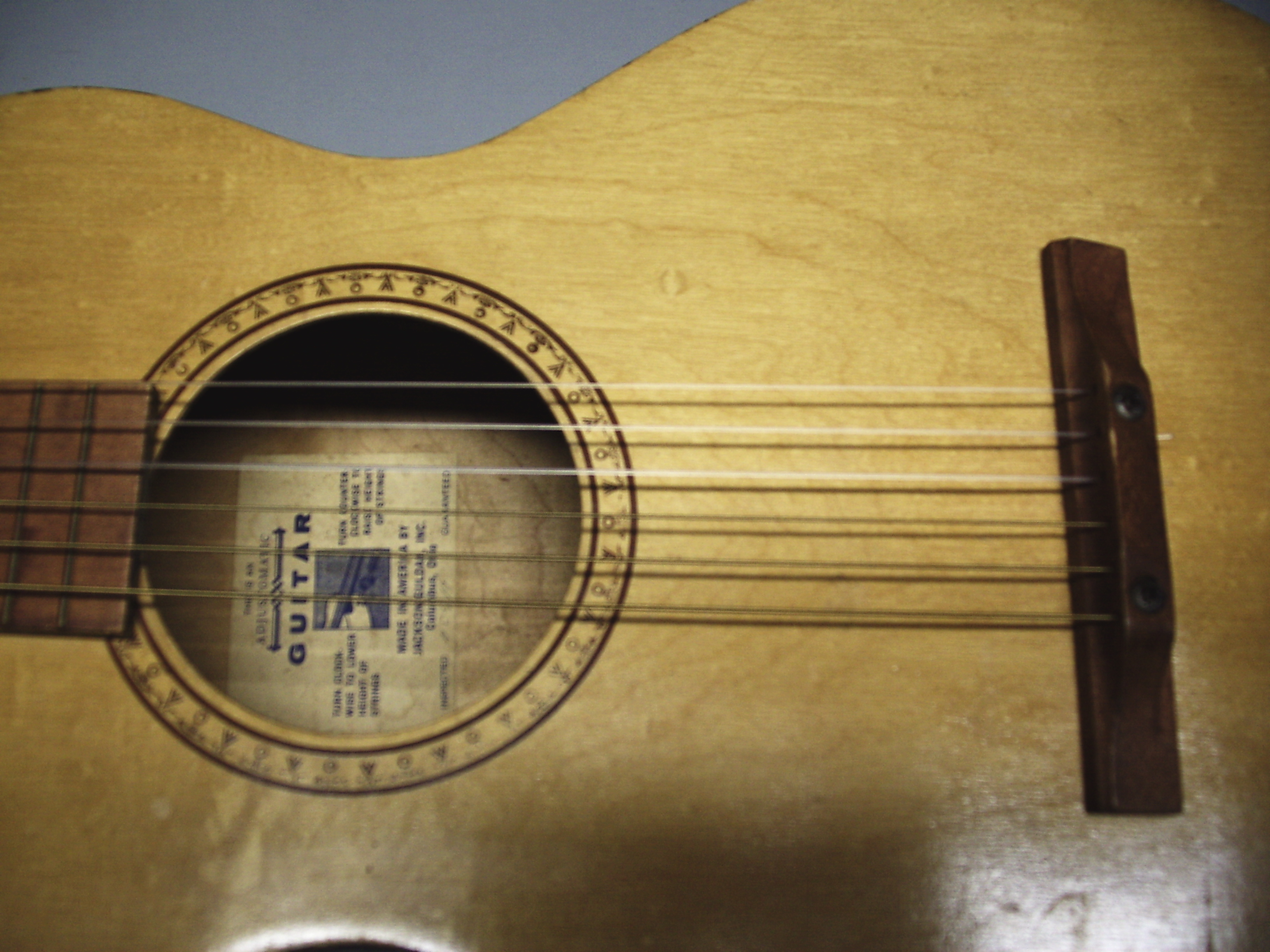
Jackson Guldan sound-hole label.
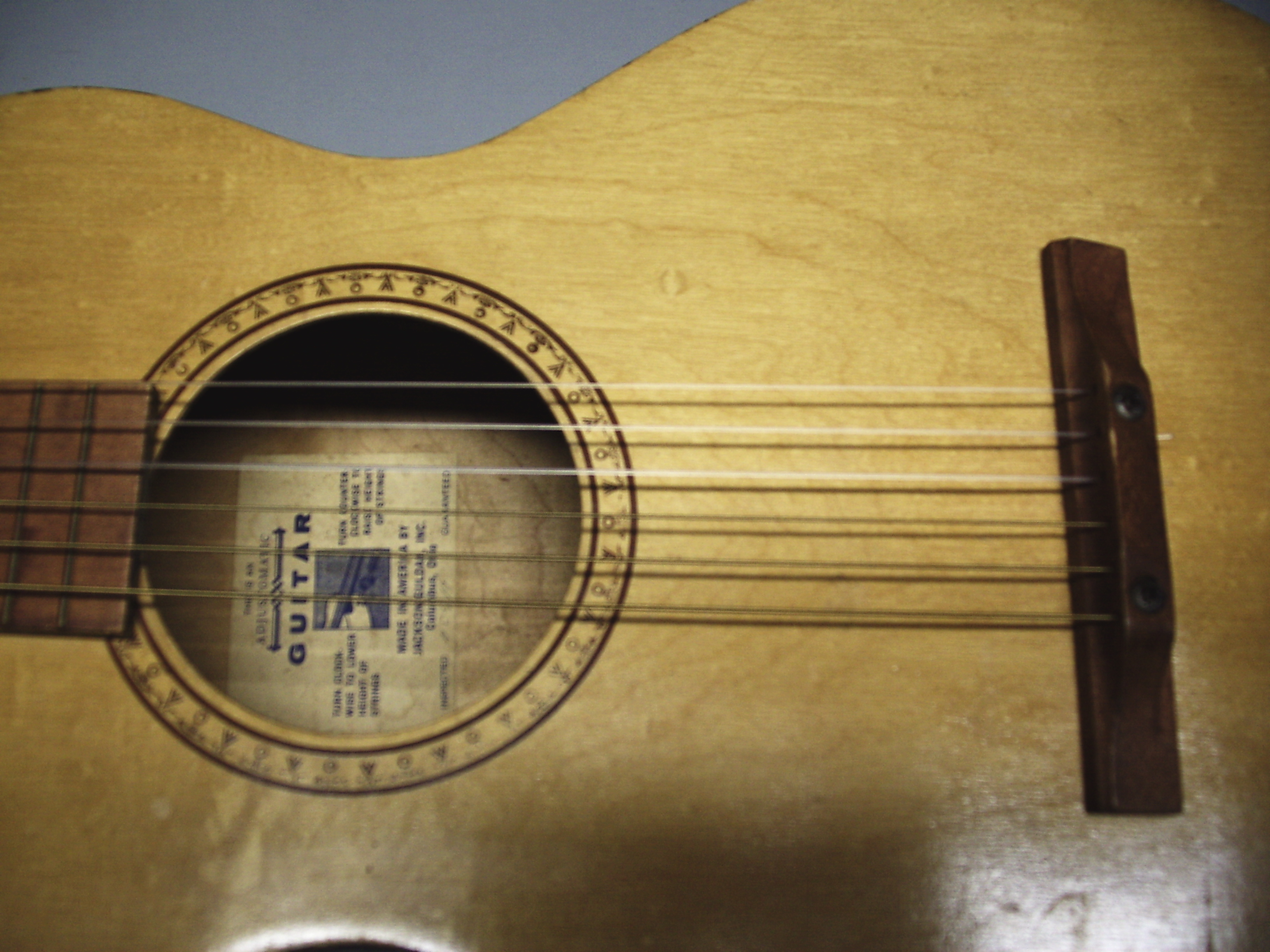
