= Smokey Rogers =

American Western swing musician (1917–1993)

Eugene Rogers (March 23, 1917–November 23, 1993), known professionally as Smokey Rogers, was an American Western swing musician and songwriter, active during the 1940s and '50s on the West Coast.

Born in McMinnville, Tennessee, Rogers joined Spade Cooley's band in the 1940s (who gave Rogers his stage name). Tex Williams, Rogers, and other members of Cooley's band formed a group called the Western Caravan. Both groups featured Rogers on vocals for novelty songs.

Rogers co-wrote "Spanish Fandango" with Bob Wills, released in 1947. In 1949, he had a modest hit with "A Little Bird Told Me". Rogers is best known for writing the ballad "Gone", first recorded by Ferlin Husky in 1952. When Husky re-recorded the song in 1956, it reached number one on the country chart. It remained there for 10 weeks and crossed over to the pop chart. He also wrote "My Chickashay Gal", popularized by Roy Rogers.

From 1947–50, Eugene Rogers appeared in at least 22 of Universal Studios' "musical featurettes" with Tex Williams. In 1950, he bought the Bostonia Ballroom in El Cajon, California, near San Diego, and started a daily live TV show from the facility. In 1958, he was also doing a radio show on 50,000-watt XERB in Rosarita Beach, Mexico. He programmed both sides of a Zane Ashton (aka Bill Aken) record of 'The Wind Running Through" with the flip side being the same song in Spanish and called "El Viento". The resulting sales in Mexico gave Ashton his first gold record.

Rogers and his first wife, Madelene, had six children; Laura Jo, Carl, Harold, Ruth-Ann, and twin sons, Roy and Rex Rogers. Rogers and his second wife lived in Apple Valley, California, for several years, where he was a local radio personality and performed regularly at the Branding Iron Restaurant. He died in San Diego on November 23, 1993, at age 76.

== Discography ==
Year	Part #	Titles	Notes
4 Star Records
1945	1019	Shame On You // Please Give Me One More Chance	as Smokey Rogers & His Four Star Rangers
1945	1020	What It Means To Be Blue // Blues In My Mind	as Smokey Rogers & His Four Star Rangers
1946	1067	Don't Try To Pretend // Turn My Picture Upside Down	as Buck Rogers & His Texans
1946	1068	Are You Somebody's Darlin' // Double Trouble	as Buck Rogers & His Texans
1946	1136	No Vacancy // I Let My Wife Support Me	as Smokey (Buck) Rogers & His Texans
1946	1137	Tho' I Tried (I Can't Forget You) // Texas Tornado	as Smokey (Buck) Rogers & His Texans
1947	1153	Seven Come Eleven // Huggin' And Chalkin'	as Smokey (Buck) Rogers & His Texans
1947	1154	Why, Oh Why, Did I Ever Leave Wyoming // I Ain't Gonna Cry No More	as Smokey (Buck) Rogers & His Texans
1947	1157	Possum Song // I Can't Help The Way You Feel	as Smokey (Buck) Rogers & His Texans
1947	1158	No She Don't – Yes She Does // Carry Me To Tucumcari	as Smokey (Buck) Rogers & His Texans
1947	1182	Chime Bells (v: Texie Holle) // Flying Saucers [duet]	as Texie Holle & Smokey Rogers
1947	1183	How Lonely Can Yo Get (v: Texie Holle) // Goin' Down The Road [duet]	as Texie Holle & Smokey Rogers
Capitol Records
1948	40080	Spanish Fandango // Drinkin' And A-Thinkin'	as Smokey Rogers with Tex Williams' Western Caravan
1948	40098	Chickashay Gal // Slap 'Er Down Agin, Paw	as Smokey Rogers with Tex Williams' Western Caravan
1948	40123	Don't Come Cryin' To Me // Blue Bonnet Polka	as Smokey Rogers with Tex Williams' Western Caravan
1948	15217	Hair Of Gold, Eyes Of Blue (with The McCall Twins) // Ball Of Fire	as Smokey Rogers with Tex Williams' Western Caravan
1948	15326	A Little Bird Told Me // Baby Me, Baby	as Smokey Rogers
1949	15406	Sui Sin Fa // Ten More Miles	as Smokey Rogers with Tex Williams' Western Caravan
1949	40199	A Kiss To Remember // The Spelling Song (I L-O-V-E U)	as Smokey Rogers
1949	40230	Rich Man, Poor Man, Beggar Man, Thief // Make Believe Heart	as Smokey Rogers with Tex Williams' Western Caravan
1950	40284	(Without Your) Wedding Ring // Dimples Or Dumplin's	as Smokey Rogers
1950	F864	Bloodshot Eyes [duet] // Doin' Fine (v: Ann Jones)	as Ann Jones & Smokey Rogers
1950	F986	Rubber Knuckle Sam (v: Smokey Rogers) // The Dipsy Doodle	as Cliffie Stone & His Hometown Jamboree Gang
Coral Records
1950	64052	Nine-Tenths Of The Tennessee River (Are The Tears I Shed Over You) // New Panhandle Rag	as Smokey Rogers & His String Band
1950	64057	The Texas Song // Trouble Then Satisfaction (v: Jimmy Widener)	as Smokey Rogers & His String Band
1950	64063	Lose Your Blues (v: Ferlin Husky) // Tamburitza Boogie	as Smokey Rogers & His String Band
1951	64077	Catch Me Cheatin' // Oh How I Cry About You (v: Dean Eacker)	as Smokey Rogers & His String Band
1951	64088	Irma Is The Name Of My Baby // Tulsa Trot (with Joaquin Murphey)	as Smokey Rogers & The Western Caravan
1951	64092	Steel Guitar Jubilee (instrumental) (with Joaquin Murphey) // Wear My Ribbon	as Smokey Rogers & His Western Caravan
Western Caravan Records
1952	901	Gone // Blue	as 'Smokey Rogers & The Western Caravan'
1953	902	Long Lost Love // Ragtime Accordion Joe (instrumental)	as Smokey Rogers & His Western Caravan
1953	903	Goodnight (with The Meyers Sisters) // John's Boogie (instrumental)	as Smokey Rogers & His Western Caravan
1954	105	Right Out of My Heart (v: Slim Dossy) // That's All (I Can't Forget You) (v: Slim Dossy)	as Smokey Rogers & His Western Caravan
1954	106	Even Tho' // Dissatisfied	as Smokey Rogers & His Western Caravan
1955	108	Waltz of Texas (v: Bill Pray) // When (v: Bill Pray)	as Smokey Rogers & His Western Caravan
1955	109	The Chicago Song, Pt. 1 // The Chicago Song, Pt. 2	as Smokey Rogers & His Western Caravan
Caravan Records
1957	1957	I Want My Gal // The Day You Left Me	as Tommy Duncan with Smokey Rogers & His Band

== Links ==
- Smokey Rogers bio - CMT
- Smokey Rogers at IMDb
