= Herb Remington =

American lap steel guitarist (1928–2016)

- Remington, c. 1948

Background information
- Also known as: Herb
- Born: Herbert Leroy Remington; June 9, 1926; Mishawaka, Indiana, U.S.
- Died: October 27, 2018 (aged 92) Texas
- Genres: Western Swing; Hawaiian music
- Occupation: Musician
- Instrument: Lap Steel Guitar
- Years active: 1946–2015
- Label: Various

Herbert Leroy Remington (June 9, 1926 – October 27, 2018) was an American lap steel guitarist who played Western swing music with Bob Wills and the Texas Playboys from 1946 to 1949. A member of the International Steel Guitar Hall of Fame (1979), Remington is known for his Hawaiian style playing combined with swing-based jazz soloing. One of his signature recordings was Bob Wills's "Boot Heel Drag", which appeared on the B-side of Wills's classic hit, "Faded Love". He is also known for "Remington's Ride", a song that became a standard for steel players. Indiana-born Remington studied Hawaiian steel guitar as a youth, but serendipitously got into Western swing music in his teens and became one of the genres most renowned steel guitarists.

== Early life ==
Remington was born in Mishawaka, Indiana, a suburb of South Bend; his mother taught him piano until he was about eight years old. He learned to play a conventional guitar in the finger-picking style of Merle Travis. He had lessons from door-to-door instrument salesmen and mail-order lessons at $1.25 per week. As a youth he was impressed when he first heard Hawaiian music played by a steel guitar at a local movie theater. He studied Hawaiian steel, taking sixty lessons from the Oahu Music Company that sold instruments and taught children from several nearby states. In high school he played steel guitar in a band called the "Honolulu Serenaders of South Bend Indiana".

== Becoming a professional musician ==
After high school, he visited California in 1943 looking for a job. The Hawaiian music jobs he sought were filled, but he found an opening playing Western swing in a 12-piece orchestra, singer Ray Whitley’s band, the Rhythm Wranglers. He then received his World War II draft notice for military service.

When he was discharged from the Army in 1946, the 20-year-old Remington, playing a double neck Rickenbacker, auditioned for a steel guitar job in a band being formed by Bob Wills's brother, Luke Wills. The audition was in a Hollywood hotel room crammed with musicians and Bob Wills was conducting it. Wills was impressed by Remington's skill to the point that he dismissed his current steel player and hired Remington on the spot for his own band. Remington said, "He took a chance on me not knowing if I would develop at all." Soon Remington was playing at venues like Santa Monica's Aragon Ballroom for 5,000 people. After his time with Bob Wills, Remington played in the Hank Penny band and recorded "Remington's Ride" in 1949.

Leo Fender was a musical instrument maker who kept a careful eye on the most prominent musicians of the day, seeking their input in field-testing his new designs. He wanted famous players to play his instruments as an endorsement to help his fledgling business. Many musicians who attended Wills's dances were keen observers the band's musical gear. "When we got back from a tour," Remington said, "Leo's desk would be just piled with orders from these people who would see our equipment." Whenever the Bob Wills band returned to Los Angeles, Fender would take up all the amplifiers and supply the band with new models. Fender began building steel guitars, and gave Remington every new model he made thereafter without taking the old ones back, a process that continued until Fender's death.

== Later life ==
In the 1950s, Remington left Hank Penny, married and settled in Houston, Texas. He worked with Merle Haggard providing Bob Wills tributes, and later toured and recorded as the Playboys II, a band made up of alumni of Wills's original Texas Playboys. Remington recorded regularly after 1972 with the River Road Boys. In 1986 he manufactured a line of non-pedal steel guitars bearing his name, featuring his own modifications to the Fender Stringmasters. Based in Houston, he spent years performing Hawaiian music with his wife, Melba, in a Polynesian revue that toured the country and had a residency in Las Vegas. He was inducted into the International Steel Guitar Hall of Fame in 1979. His wife died in 2015; they had been married for 63 years. Remington died on October 27, 2018.
