= Noel Boggs =

American musician; steel guitar virtuoso (1917-1974)

Noel Edwin Boggs
- Boggs with Fender Stringmaster c. 1955

Background information
- Born: November 14, 1917; Oklahoma City, Oklahoma, U.S.
- Died: August 31, 1974 (aged 56) Granada Hills, California
- Genres: Western swing
- Occupation: Musician
- Instrument: Steel guitar
- Years active: 1936–1970
- Formerly of: Bob Wills, Spade Cooley, Jimmy Wakely

Noel Edwin Boggs (November 13, 1917 – August 31, 1974) was an American musician who was a virtuoso on the electric steel guitar, widely regarded as a pioneer of the lap steel. A central figure in popularizing the genre of Western swing, he helped elevate the instrument from its roots in Hawaiian music to a prominent role in American popular music. During the 1940s and 1950s, Boggs performed and recorded with many of influential artists, including Bob Wills and His Texas Playboys (1944–1945) and Spade Cooley's dance band. His collaboration with Wills helped establish the role of the steel guitar in country music. He performed on more than 2,000 recordings, including several of Wills’ enduring hits, such as “Roly Poly” and “Stay a Little Longer,” both of which became Western swing standards. Boggs was inducted into the Steel Guitar Hall of Fame in 1981.

== Early life ==
Born in Oklahoma City in 1917, Boggs began playing steel guitar in his youth, and in 1935 was performing on three local radio stations while still in high school. At that point, the electric pickup to amplify a guitar had been recently invented in 1934. (Note: Patent applied for June 2, 1934 and granted August 10, 1937.) Boggs began playing on a Rickenbacker lap steel, the first electrified string instrument. Just a month before his graduation from high school, he was invited to join Hank Penny's Radio Cowboys in 1937 for a tour of the Southeastern United States. At that time, the electric lap steel guitar was a new musical device and Western swing became a vehicle for trying new things with the instrument. It was used to create horn-like punches and provide single-note solos, and to join fiddles and traditional guitars in three-part harmony. After the Rickenbacker, Boggs played an Epiphone double-neck steel guitar. He was one of the first steel players to switch between guitar necks in mid-solo in order to get different chord voicings.

== Career ==
Boggs performed with Jimmy Wakely during the late 1930s. He befriended guitar manufacturer Leo Fender in 1946 and became the owner the first product of Fender's new musical instrument company, a lap steel guitar. Musician Billy Strange said, "Speedy [West], Noel Boggs, Jimmy Bryant, and I—the four of us would go out there [to the Fender factory] and just play around as much as we could and help them with design, and tell them the things that we wanted to see put on the instrument." Boggs' instrument of choice became the Fender Stringmaster for most of his career. He became noted for his electric steel guitar playing that popularized the instrument beyond its native Hawaiian music into other genres of American popular music, specifically Western swing. Boggs befriended jazz guitarist Charlie Christian, whose solos were transcribed by Boggs to create arrangements for three guitars on songs such as "Flying Home" or "Good Enough to Keep". Over his career, Boggs appeared on around 2,000 recordings as a soloist and performed with nearly every major artist in Western swing, including Bob Wills, Spade Cooley, Bill Boyd, Tommy Duncan and Hank Penny. Boggs was featured on Penny's 1946 hit instrumental "Steel Guitar Stomp" with electric guitar played by Merle Travis. With Bob Wills, several hits featuring Boggs became standards, including "Roly Poly", "Texas Playboy Rag" and "Stay a Little Longer".

In the early years of steel guitar, the instrument was limited to basic chords: major, minor, an occasional sixth chord. The only way to get more chords and voicings was to add additional necks to the instrument, each tuned differently. In 1949, Fender created a triple-neck console steel for Boggs requiring a metal frame with legs to hold it. Fender later delivered a quadruple neck model to Boggs on July 1, 1953, known as "Boggs' Quad". The addition of multiple necks eventually stopped, with the invention of the pedal steel guitar, but Boggs refused to switch to the instrument. After leaving Spade Cooley's band in 1954, Boggs formed his own quintet, playing throughout California and Nevada as well as on tours by the United Service Organizations. By the late 1960s, diminishing health slowed Boggs' activity.

Boggs died August 31, 1974 (age 56) after suffering a stroke and heart attack.
