= Steel guitar =

Type of guitar or the method of playing the instrument

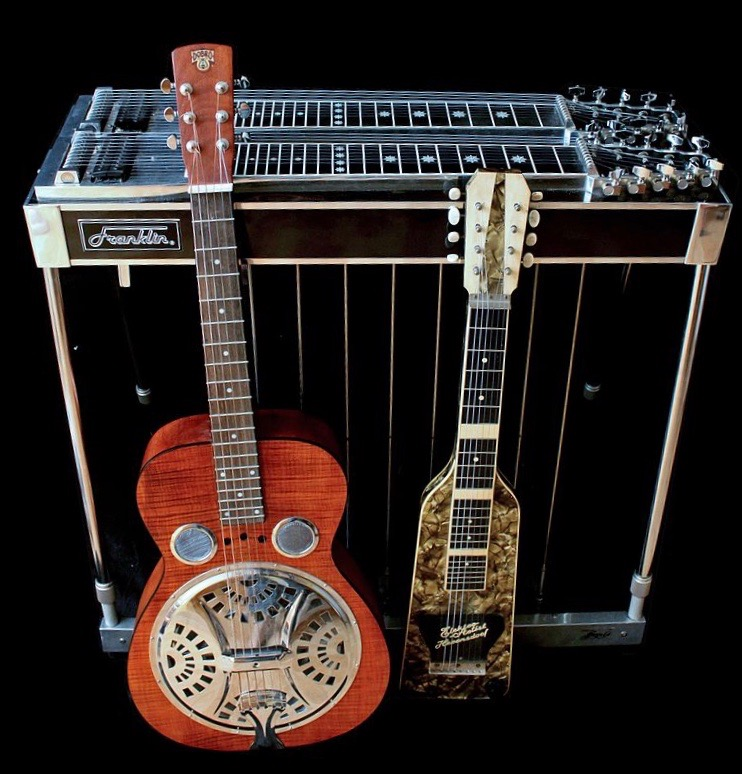
- Three types of steel guitars: resonator (left), lap steel (right), pedal steel (background)

String instrument
- Other names: Hawaiian guitar, lap steel, pedal steel, console steel, kīkākila, Dobro
- Classification: String instrument, flat picked or finger picked
- Hornbostel–Sachs classification: (Composite chordophone)
- Inventor: Popularized by Joseph Kekuku
- Developed: 1890

Playing range
- Variable

A steel guitar (Hawaiian: kīkākila) is a guitar played while moving a steel bar or similar hard object against plucked strings. The bar itself is called a "steel" and is the source of the name "steel guitar". The instrument differs from a conventional guitar in that it has no frets—but markers that look like frets. Conceptually, it is somewhat akin to playing a guitar with one finger (the bar). Known for its smooth, gliding glissandi over every pitch between notes, the instrument can produce a sinuous crying sound and deep vibrato emulating the human singing voice. Typically, the strings are plucked (not strummed) by the fingers of one hand, while the steel tone bar is pressed lightly against the strings and moved by the opposite hand.

The idea of creating music with a slide of some type has been traced back to early African instruments, but the modern steel guitar was conceived and popularized in the Hawaiian Islands. The Hawaiians began playing a conventional guitar in a horizontal position across the knees instead of flat against the body, using the bar instead of fingers. Joseph Kekuku developed this manner of playing a guitar, known as "Hawaiian style", about 1890 and the technique spread internationally.

The sound of Hawaiian music featuring steel guitar became an enduring musical fad in the United States in the first half of the twentieth century, and, in 1916, recordings of indigenous Hawaiian music outsold all other U.S. musical genres. This popularity spawned the manufacture of guitars designed specifically to be played horizontally. The archetypal instrument is the Hawaiian guitar, also called a lap steel. These early acoustic instruments were not loud enough relative to other instruments, but that changed in 1934 when a steel guitarist named George Beauchamp invented the electric guitar pickup. Electrification allowed these instruments to be heard, and it also meant their resonant chambers were no longer essential. After that, steel guitars could be manufactured in any design, even a rectangular block bearing little or no resemblance to the traditional guitar shape. The result were table-like instruments in a metal frame on legs called "console steels", which were technologically improved in about 1950 to become the more versatile pedal steel guitar.

In the United States, the steel guitar influenced popular music in the early twentieth century, combining with jazz, swing and country music to be prominently heard in Western swing, honky-tonk, gospel and bluegrass. The instrument influenced Blues artists in the Mississippi Delta who embraced the steel guitar sound but continued holding their guitar in the traditional way; they used a tubular object (the neck of a bottle) called a "slide" around a finger. This technique, historically called "bottleneck" guitar, is now known as "slide guitar" and is commonly associated with blues and rock music. Bluegrass artists adapted the Hawaiian style of playing in a resonator guitar known as a "Dobro", a type of steel guitar with a reinforced neck, sometimes played with the musician standing and the guitar facing upward held horizontally by a shoulder strap.

Sound of a steel guitar playing Hawaiian music

== Steel guitar versus traditional Spanish guitar ==
Several distinct differences exist in both the construction and musical capabilities of the steel guitar and the traditional Spanish (classical) guitar. The steel guitar is capable of producing smooth glissandi, enabling it to glide seamlessly between pitches in a manner reminiscent of the human voice—a feat not possible on a traditional fretted guitar. This is the hallmark characteristic of the steel guitar. The instrument also has significant limitations. Unlike a classical guitar, where the fingers press individual strings to produce chords and notes, the steel guitar employs a solid steel bar placed across all the strings. This allows the instrument to play only the chords available within its tuning, significantly reducing harmonic flexibility. Functionally, it is akin to playing with a single rigid "finger" rather than multiple independent ones.

Note articulation differs between the two instruments. On a Spanish guitar, lifting the finger from the fretboard immediately silences the sounding note. By contrast, a note on the steel guitar continues to sound until it is manually dampened by the player or another note is played on the same string. A novice player who has not learned this blocking technique, finds the notes are superimposed and blurred together, much like a piano played with the sustain pedal permanently depressed.

Finally, while frets on a Spanish guitar ensure precise intonation (assuming the instrument is properly tuned), the steel guitar lacks such guides. The performer must place the bar precisely over imaginary fret positions to remain in tune, making accurate pitch control more demanding to master. The table below compares the two instruments in a simplified general overview.

Comparison of steel guitar and Spanish (classical) guitar
Feature	Steel guitar	Spanish (classical) guitar
Playing mechanism	Single steel bar against strings, no frets	Fingers press individual strings against frets
Number of strings	6–14	6
Attack	Typically finger-picked	Strummed or finger-picked
Note articulation	Smooth glides (glissando); continuous	Glissando possible, but pitch changes occur in semitone increments
Chord formation	Largely limited to the instrument’s original tuning configuration	Individual fingers can fret different strings independently, permitting a wider range of chord voicings
Note sustain	Sustains until decays or is manually muted	Typically silenced when finger is lifted off fret
Intonation	Determined entirely by bar placement	Frets establish pitch locations

== History ==
In the late 19th century, European sailors and Portuguese vaqueros, hired by Hawaii's king to work cattle ranches, introduced Spanish guitars in the Hawaiian Islands. For whatever reason, Hawaiians did not embrace standard guitar tuning that had been in use for centuries. They re-tuned their guitars to make them sound a major chord when all six strings were strummed, now known as an "open tuning". The term for this is "slack-key" because certain strings were "slackened" to achieve it. With the advent of guitar strings made of steel instead of catgut, new possibilities opened for the islanders. They used some smooth object, usually a piece of pipe or metal, sliding it over the strings to the fourth or fifth position, easily playing a three-chord song. (Note: The Hawaiians also learned to play this re-tuned guitar without a steel, fretting it and holding it against the body like a traditional guitar. This led to its own genre known as slack-key guitar.) It is physically difficult to hold a steel bar against the strings while holding the guitar against the body (hand supinated) so the Hawaiians placed the guitar across the lap and played it with the hand pronated. Playing this way became popular throughout Hawaii and spread internationally.

Oahu-born Joseph Kekuku became proficient in this style of playing around the end of the 19th century and popularized it—some sources say he invented the steel guitar. He moved to the U.S. and became a vaudeville performer and also toured Europe performing Hawaiian music. The Hawaiian style of playing spread to America and became popular during the first half of the 20th century; noted players of the era were Frank Ferera, Sam Ku West, "King" Bennie Nawahi and Sol Hoʻopiʻi. Hoʻopiʻi (/ˌhoʊoʊˈpiːi/ hoh-oh-PEE-ee) was perhaps the most famous of the Hawaiians who spread the sound of instrumental lap steel worldwide. This music became popular to the degree that it was called the "Hawaiian craze" and was ignited by a number of events.

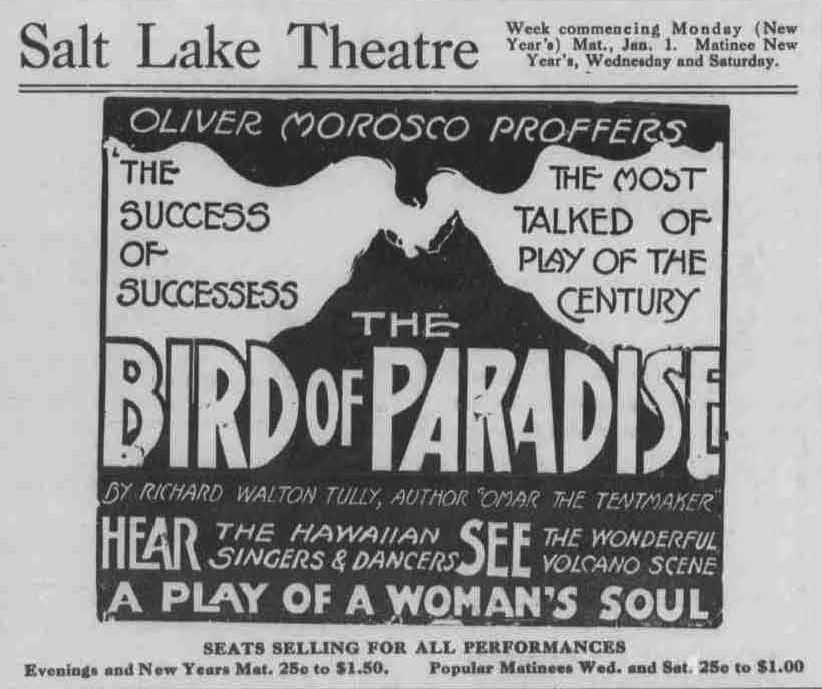
An advertisement for the Broadway show "The Bird of Paradise"

The annexation of Hawaii as a U.S. territory in 1900 stimulated Americans' interest in Hawaiian music and customs. In 1912, a Broadway musical show called The Bird of Paradise premiered; it featured Hawaiian music and elaborate costumes. The show became quite successful and, to ride this wave of success, it toured the U.S. and Europe, eventually spawning the 1932 film Bird of Paradise. Joseph Kekuku was a member of the show's original cast and toured with the show for eight years. In 1918, The Washington Herald stated, "So great is the popularity of Hawaiian music in this country that The Bird of Paradise will go on record as having created the greatest musical fad this country has ever known". In 1915, a world's fair called the Panama–Pacific International Exposition was held in San Francisco to celebrate the opening of the Panama Canal and over a nine-month period introduced the Hawaiian style of guitar playing to millions of visitors. In 1916, recordings of indigenous Hawaiian instruments outsold every other genre of music in the U.S.

Radio broadcasts played a role in fueling the popularity of Hawaiian music. Hawaii Calls was a program originating in Hawaii and broadcast to the U.S. mainland west coast. It featured the steel guitar, ukulele, and Hawaiian songs sung in English. Subsequently, the program was heard worldwide on over 750 stations. Sol Hoʻopiʻi began broadcasting live from KHJ radio in Los Angeles in 1923. By the 1920s, Hawaiian music instruction for children was becoming common in the U.S. One of the steel guitar's foremost virtuosos, Buddy Emmons, studied at the Hawaiian Conservatory of Music in South Bend, Indiana, at age 11 in 1948.

The acceptance of the sound of the steel guitar, then referred to as "Hawaiian guitars" or "lap steels", spurred instrument makers to produce them in quantity and create innovations in the design to accommodate this style of playing.

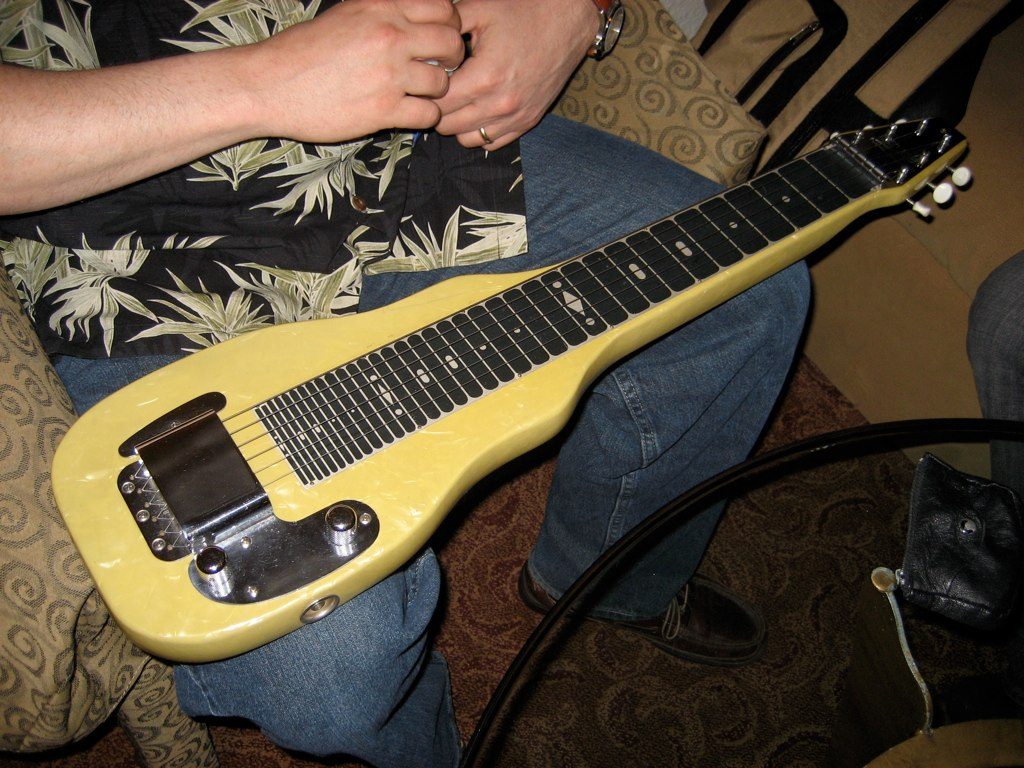
An electric lap steel guitar. Note that the instrument bears only token resemblance to the traditional guitar shape.

In the early twentieth century, steel guitar playing branched off into two streams: lap-style, performed on an instrument specifically designed or modified to be played on the performer's lap; and bottleneck-style, performed on a traditional Spanish guitar held flat against the body. The bottleneck-style became associated with blues and rock music, and the horizontal style became associated with several musical genres, including Hawaiian music, country music, Western swing, honky-tonk, bluegrass and gospel.

== Use in musical genres ==
=== Blues music ===
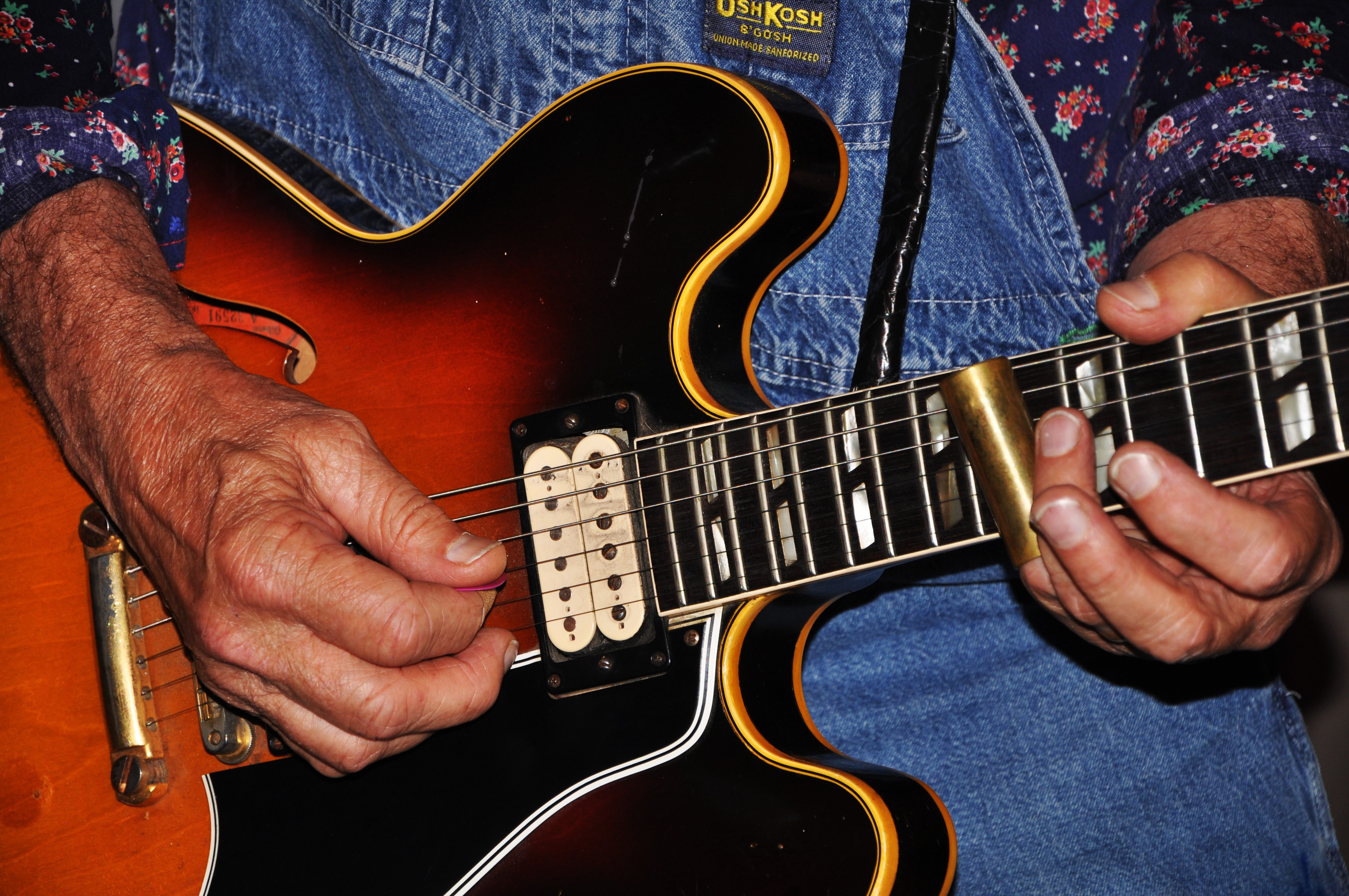
Slide guitar played with slide on musician's little finger

Solo African-American blues artists popularized the bottleneck-style (slide guitar) near the beginning of the twentieth century. One of the first southern blues musicians to adapt the Hawaiian sound to the blues was Tampa Red, whose playing, says historian Gérard Herzhaft, "created a style that has unquestionably influenced all modern blues". The Mississippi Delta was the home of Robert Johnson, Son House, Charlie Patton and other blues pioneers, who used a prominent tubular slide on a finger. The first known recording of the bottleneck style was in 1923 by Sylvester Weaver, who recorded two instrumentals, "Guitar Blues" and "Guitar Rag". Western swing pioneers Bob Wills and Leon McAuliffe adapted his song, "Guitar Rag", in 1935 for the influential instrumental "Steel Guitar Rag". Blues musicians played a conventional Spanish guitar as a hybrid between the two types of guitars, using one finger inserted into a tubular slide or a bottleneck with one finger while using frets with the remaining fingers (usually for rhythm accompaniment). This technique allows the player to finger the frets on some strings and use the slide on others. Slide players may use open tunings or traditional tunings as a matter of personal preference. Lap slide guitar is not a specific instrument but a style of playing a lap steel guitar usually referring to blues or rock music.

=== Country music ===
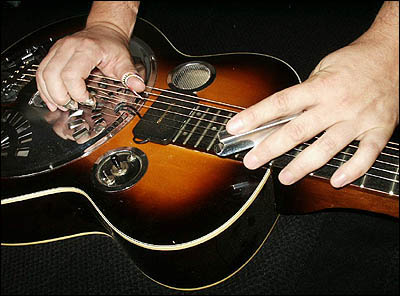
Resonator guitar played in lap steel fashion. It demonstrates slanting the bar and a grooved tone bar

The earliest record of a Hawaiian guitar used in country music is believed to be in the early 1920s when cowboy movie star Hoot Gibson brought Sol Hoʻopiʻi to Los Angeles to perform in his band. In 1927, the acoustic duo of Darby and Tarleton expanded the audience for acoustic steel guitar with their Columbia recording of "Birmingham Jail" and "Columbus Stockade Blues". Jimmie Rodgers featured an acoustic steel guitar on his song "Tuck Away My Lonesome Blues" released on January 3, 1930. In the early 1930s, acoustic lap steel guitars were not loud enough to compete with other instruments, a problem that many inventors were trying to remedy.

==== Resonator guitars ====
In 1927, the Dopyera brothers patented the resonator guitar, a non-electric device resembling a large inverted loudspeaker cone attached under the bridge of a guitar to make it louder. The name "Dobro", a portmanteau of DOpyera and BROthers, became a generic term for this type of guitar, popularized by Pete Kirby ("Bashful Brother Oswald") on Nashville's Grand Ole Opry for 30 years with Roy Acuff's band. He played the instrument while standing with the guitar facing upward held horizontally by a shoulder strap. Oswald's Dobro attracted interest and fascination; he said, "People couldn't understand how I played it and what it was, and they'd always want to come around and look at it." Josh Graves (Uncle Josh) further popularized the resonator steel guitar into Bluegrass music with Flatt and Scruggs to the extent that this type of lap steel became an established and familiar fixture in this genre. The dobro fell out of favor in mainstream country music until a bluegrass revival in the 1970s brought it back with younger virtuoso players like Jerry Douglas whose Dobro skills became widely known and emulated.

==== Electrification ====
In 1934, a steel guitarist named George Beauchamp invented the electric guitar pickup. He found that a vibrating metal string in a magnetic field generates a small current that can be amplified and sent to a loudspeaker; his steel guitar was the world's first electric guitar. According to music writer Michael Ross, the first electrified stringed instrument on a commercial recording was a steel guitar played by Bob Dunn on a Western swing tune in 1935. Dunn recorded with Milton Brown and his Musical Brownies.

==== Western swing ====
In the early 1930s, musicians adopted the newly-electrified lap steel guitar into a type of dance music known as "Western swing", a sub-genre of country music combined with jazz swing. The design of this instrument and the way it was played underwent continual change as the music of the genre evolved. In the 1930s, Leon McAuliffe advanced steel guitar technique while playing in the western swing band Bob Wills and his Texas Playboys. In October, 1936, McAuliffe recorded "Steel Guitar Rag" with Wills' band on a Rickenbacker B–6 lap steel with phenomenal record sales. Steel guitarists felt a need to change tunings for different voicings, so leading players added additional necks with different tunings on the same instrument. The added bulk meant that the instrument could no longer be managed on the player's lap and required placement in a frame with legs and marketed as a "console" steel guitar. Prominent layers of that era, including Herb Remington and Noel Boggs, added more necks and eventually played instruments with up to four different necks.

==== Honky-tonk ====
By the late 1940s, the steel guitar featured prominently in "honky-tonk" style of country music. Honky-tonk singers who used a lap steel guitar in their musical arrangements included Hank Williams, Lefty Frizzell and Webb Pierce.

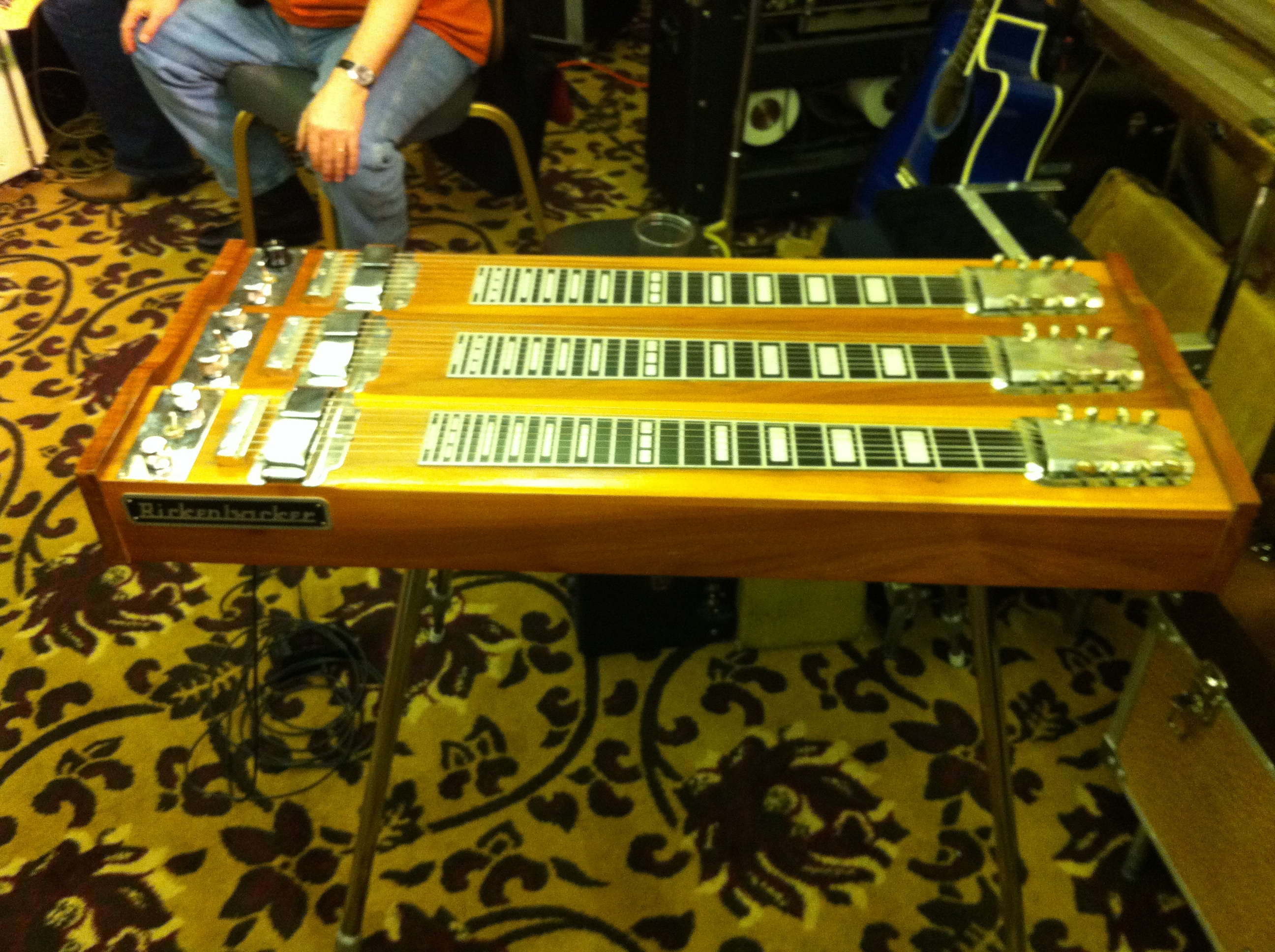
Rickenbacker Console 758 triple neck steel

Most recordings of that era were made on a C6 neck (guitar tuned in a C6 chord), sometimes called a "Texas tuning". Using tunings with sixths and ninths became common and identifiable with the steel guitar sound.

==== Modern country music and pedal steel ====
The original idea for adding pedals to a console guitar was simply to push a pedal and change the tuning of all the strings into a different tuning and thus obviate the need for an additional neck, but these early efforts were unsuccessful. Around 1948, Paul Bigsby, a motorcycle shop foreman, designed a pedal system. He put pedals on a rack between the two front legs of a console steel guitar to create the pedal steel guitar. The pedals operated a mechanical linkage to apply tension to raise the pitch of certain strings. In 1953, musician Bud Isaacs used Bigsby's invention to change the pitch of only two of the strings, and was the first to push the pedal while notes were still sounding.

Western Swing played on a pedal steel guitar

When Isaacs first used the setup on the 1954 recording of Webb Pierce's song called "Slowly", he pushed the pedal while playing a chord, so certain notes could be heard bending up from below into the existing chord to harmonize with the other strings, creating a stunning effect which had not been possible with on a lap steel. It was the birth of a new sound that was particularly embraced by fans of country and western music, and it caused a virtual revolution among steel players who wanted to duplicate it. Almost simultaneously, an entire musical subculture took a radical stylistic tack. Even though pedal steel guitars had been available for over a decade before this recording, the instrument emerged as a crucial element in country music after the success of this song. When the lap steel was thus superseded by the pedal steel, the inherent Hawaiian influence was brought into the new sound of country music emerging in Nashville in the 1950s. This sound became associated with American country music for the ensuing several decades.

=== Gospel music ===
In the United States in the 1930s, the steel guitar was introduced into religious music, a tradition called "Sacred Steel". The congregation of the House of God, a branch of an African-American Pentecostal denomination, based primarily in Nashville and Indianapolis, embraced the lap steel guitar. The steel guitar often took the place of an organ and its sound bore no resemblance to typical American country music.

Darick Campbell (1966–2020) was a lap steel player for the gospel band, the Campbell Brothers, who took the musical tradition from the church to international fame. Campbell played an electric Hawaiian lap steel: a Fender Stringmaster 8-string (Fender Deluxe-8). Campbell was skilled at mimicking the human singing voice with his guitar. The idea of Campbell's recordings with the Allman Brothers and other Blues and Rock artists was not well-received by church leaders.

In the 1980s, a minister's son named Robert Randolph took up the pedal steel as a teenager, popularized it in this genre and received critical acclaim as a musician. Neil Strauss, writing in The New York Times, called Randolph "one of the most original and talented pedal steel guitarists of his generation".

=== Other world music ===
==== Indian music ====
The steel guitar's popularity in India began with a Hawaiian immigrant who settled in Calcutta in the 1940s named Tau Moe (pronounced mo-ay). Moe taught Hawaiian guitar style and made steel guitars, and helped popularize the instrument in India. By the 1960s, the steel had become a common instrument in Indian popular music—later included in film soundtracks. Indian musicians typically play the lap steel while sitting on the floor and have modified the instrument by using, for example, three melody strings (played with steel bar and finger picks), four plucked drone strings, and 12 sympathetic strings to buzz like a sitar. Performing in this manner, the Indian musician Brij Bhushan Kabra adapted the steel guitar to play ragas, traditional Indian compositions and is called the father of the genre of Hindustani Slide Guitar.

==== Māori music ====
The Māori in the 1920s readily adopted the instrument following their fascination with musicians like Ernest Kaʻai and David Luela Kaili travelling across New Zealand, fascinated of their informed similar ancestry while also receiving very positively of their performances. Eruera Hita (or stagename "Mati Hita") was the pioneer of the instrument among New Zealanders.

== Lap steel guitars ==
Early lap steel guitars were traditional guitars tuned to a chord and modified by raising the strings away from the frets. After the electric pickup was invented, lap steels no longer needed any resonant chamber, thus newer designs began to resemble the traditional guitar shape less and less. These instruments were played resting across musicians' knees. George Beauchamp's invention, which he nicknamed the "Frying Pan", was officially called the "Rickenbacker Electro A–22", an electric lap steel guitar produced from 1931 to 1939. It was the first electric stringed instrument of any kind and was the first electric stringed instrument to be heard on a commercial recording. Steel players, including Noel Boggs and Alvino Rey, immediately embraced the new instrument.

The Dobro is a type of acoustic lap steel with a resonator; the word is commonly used as a generic term to describe bluegrass resonator lap steels of any brand. Bluegrass dobro players often use a "Stevens bar" which has a deep groove in it to allow the steel to be grasped more firmly so it can be lifted and angled vertically downward slightly for playing single notes. The technique also allows for hammer-on or pull-off notes when there is an adjacent open string. Dobro players often slant the bar horizontally when playing to change an interval between two or more notes played simultaneously on different strings.

== Console steel guitars ==
The console steel is any type electric steel guitar that rests on legs in a frame and is designed to be played in a seated position. The console steel usually has multiple necks—up to a maximum of four—each tuned differently. In the evolution of the steel guitar, the console steel is intermediate between the lap steel and the pedal steel.

== Pedal steel guitars ==
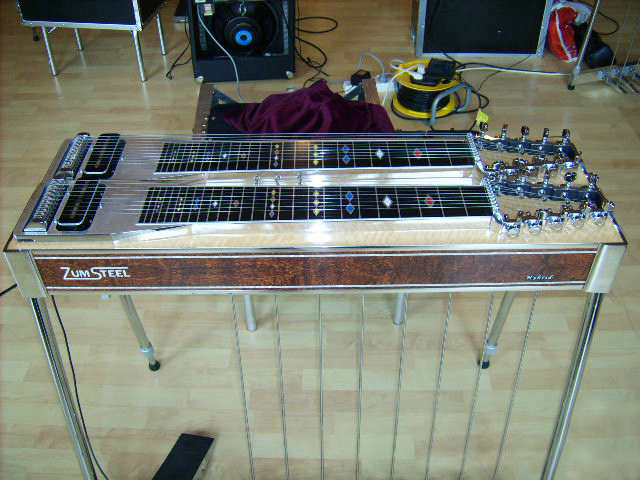
Pedal steel guitar.

The pedal steel guitar is an electric console instrument with one or two necks, each typically with ten strings. The neck tuned to C6 (Texas tuning) is closer to the player and the E9 (Nashville tuning) neck is further from the player. It may have up to ten pedals and a separate volume pedal, and up to eight knee levers are used to alter the tuning of various strings, allowing more varied and complex music than any other steel guitar. As an example, use of the pedals and knee levers in various combinations allows the player to play a major scale without moving the bar. The invention of the instrument was set in motion by the need to play more interesting and varied music that was not possible on previous steel guitars and to obviate the need for additional necks on console steels.

== Steels and slides ==
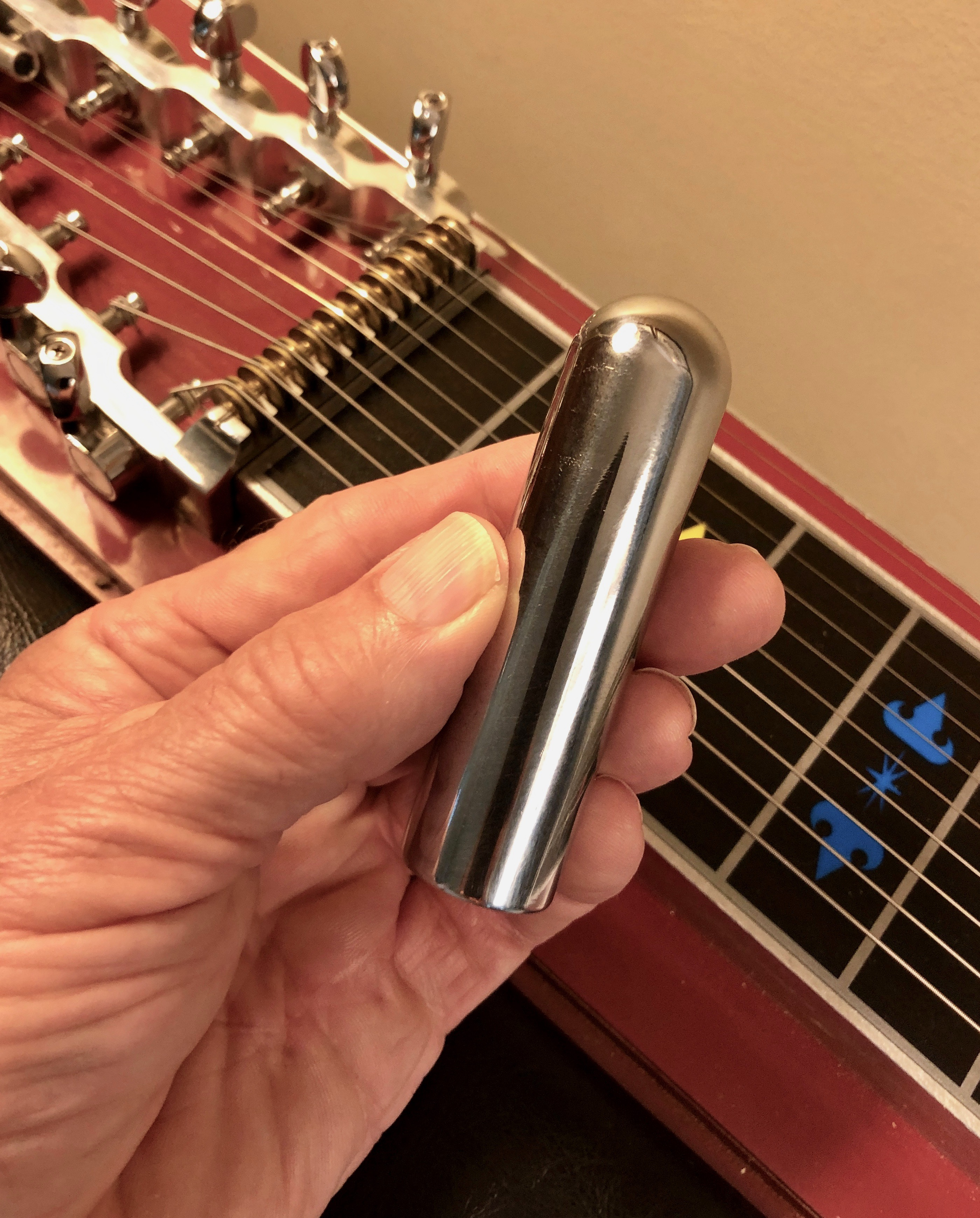
Steel bar (tonebar) used in playing steel guitar. What appear to be frets on this guitar are only markers, not real frets.

A "steel" is a hard, smooth object pressed against guitar strings and is the reason for the name "steel guitar". It may go by many names, including "steel", "tone bar", "slide", "bottleneck" and others. A cylindrical-shaped steel with a bullet-shape on one end is typical in console steel and pedal steel playing. Lap steel and Dobro players often use a steel bar with squared-off ends and a deep groove for firmer grip. It has a cross section that resembles a railroad track. Another type of steel is a tubular object around a finger then referred to as a "slide"; that style of playing is called "slide guitar".

== See also ==
- Lap steel ukulele
- Slack-key guitar
