= Paul Bigsby =

American electric guitar designer (1899–1968)

Paul Adelburt Bigsby (1899–1968) was an American inventor, designer, and pioneer of the solid body electric guitar. Bigsby is best known for designing the Bigsby vibrato tailpiece (also mislabeled as a tremolo arm) and proprietor of Bigsby Electric Guitars.

Paul built an early steel guitar for Southern California steel guitarist Earl "Joaquin" Murphy of Spade Cooley's band, as well as Jack Rivers, and then built a solid body electric guitar conceptualized by Merle Travis which would possess comparable level of sustain as a steel guitar. This was achieved by anchoring the strings through the body instead of a tailpiece. Completed in 1948, the instrument would gain great popularity and further influence the design of the solid body Telecaster later produced by Leo Fender, as well as Les Paul solid body. The Bigsby headstock design contained six tuners in a row, and would influence Fender designs for the entirety of the company history, along with countless other makers. Bigsby also made a doubleneck model for Nashville guitarist Grady Martin and an amplified mandolin for Texas Playboy Tiny Moore. Bigsby also built a pedal steel guitar for Speedy West that West used on many of Tennessee Ernie Ford's early recordings as well as records by Travis, Red Ingle, Jean Shepard, Johnny Horton, Ferlin Husky and Merrill Moore.

Before working in music he was a motorcycle racer known as "P.A. Bigsby", and was the foreman of Crocker Motorcycles, and designed many components, such as the overhead-valve cylinder head for their first V-twin motorcycle. The vibrato tailpiece unit, however, was what made Bigsby's reputation, as it was used by Gibson, Gretsch and other guitar companies. In 1966, Bigsby sold the company to former Gibson guitar executive Ted McCarty. On May 10, 1999, the Fred Gretsch company purchased the Bigsby company.
