= Speedy West =

American pedal steel guitarist (1924–2003)

Background information
- Born: Wesley Webb West; January 25, 1924; Springfield, Missouri U.S.
- Died: November 15, 2003 (aged 79) Broken Arrow, Oklahoma
- Genres: Country music
- Occupations: Record producer, guitarist
- Instrument: Pedal steel guitar
- Years active: 1947-1981
- Label: Capitol
- Spouse: Opal Mae (married 1941-1964)

Wesley Webb West (January 25, 1924 – November 15, 2003), better known as Speedy West, was an American pedal steel guitarist and record producer. He frequently played with Jimmy Bryant, both in their own duo and as part of the regular Capitol Records backing band for Tennessee Ernie Ford and many others. The duo also recorded with non-Capitol artists in Los Angeles. In 1960, Speedy played on and produced Loretta Lynn's first single. During his time at Capitol, he played on over 6000 recordings, including pop records by artists like Frank Sinatra and Bing Crosby. West, who began playing Paul Bigsby's second ever pedal steel guitar in 1947, was the first country steel guitarist to use a pedal guitar. Nashville players like Bud Isaacs would adopt it in the early 1950s. After a stroke in 1981, West was unable to play pedal steel, but would continue to attend steel guitar conventions.

== Partial discography ==
- Speedy West And Jimmy Bryant – Two Guitars Country Style (1954 – Capitol Records)
- West Of Hawaii (1958 – Capitol Records)
- Steel Guitar (1960 – Capitol Records)
- Guitar Spectacular (1962 – Capitol Records)
- Speedy (1977 – Steel Guitar Record Club)
- Stratosphere Boogie: The Flaming Guitars of Speedy West and Jimmy Bryant (1995 – Razor & Tie)
