= Elvis Presley's guitars =

Guitars played by American singer

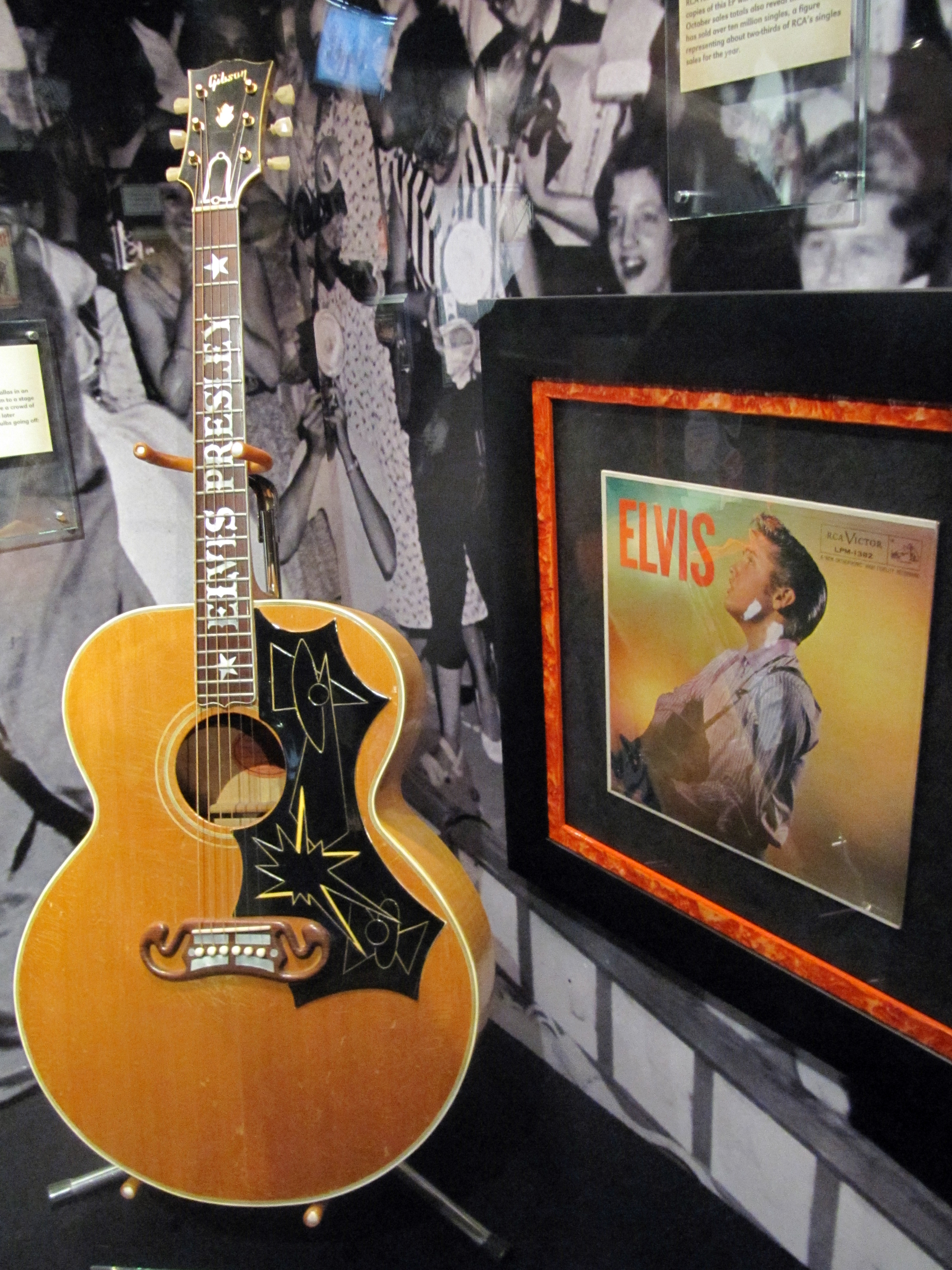
Elvis Presley's 1956 Gibson J-200 acoustic guitar

Guitars were a major component of the "rock and roll" image created by Elvis Presley in the 1950s and 1960s, onstage and in film appearances.

According to his first lead guitarist, Scotty Moore, Presley was not "an accomplished musician", yet he possessed "an uncanny and amazing sense of timing and rhythm." In the early years of his career, Presley's rhythm guitar accompaniment played a major role in the sound of his early performances and recordings. Moore noted that as Presley began to learn to move on stage and to work the audience with his physical performance, his guitar became more of a "prop".

Presley was not known to treat his instruments gently. The lack of a microphone on his guitar in his early years contributed to the development of his "aggressive style in attempt to be heard," and his strumming style would frequently break strings during his performances. As his career progressed, he became even more aggressive toward his instruments, frequently tossing his guitar to Charlie Hodge, who sometimes failed to catch it. As well, the large belt buckles and jewelry Presley wore left their marks on most of his instruments.

== Performance guitars ==
The following is a list of guitars that Presley owned or used for his performances and recordings.

Year	Guitar	Serial No.	Used	Notes
1940s	Kay (Tupelo Hardware)		January 1946 – August 1954	This was Presley's first guitar, purchased at Tupelo Hardware Co. for $7.75 (US$125 in 2024 dollars) on his eleventh birthday, January 8, 1946. He used it throughout his high school years and on his first Sun recording sessions.
1936	Martin 000–18		August 1954 – November 1954	Purchased at O.K. Houck Piano Co. in Memphis for $79.50 (US$931 in 2024 dollars)
1939	Recording King		1954	Purchased at Montgomery Ward in Memphis. The guitar was given to Hall of Fame harness horseman Delvin G. Miller May 28, 1964 and includes a typed and signed note from Elvis to Miller which he affixed to the inside of the instrument. It is now in a private collection.
1942	Martin D-18	80221	November 1954 – June 1955	Purchased at O.K. Houck Piano Co. in Memphis, trading in his Martin 000-18 Sold for US$1,320,000 at a gottahaverockandroll auction on August 1, 2020
1953	Martin 00–21		1954 – 1960	Used by Elvis for performances during the mid-1950s (Note: The guitar, as well as a gold-plated Walther PPK handgun, was given to Hawaii Five-O star Jack Lord backstage during Elvis's 1973 engagement at the Las Vegas Hilton. The instrument was later acquired from the estate of Jack Lord, and includes a letter from Joe Esposito, who retrieved the unique guitar from Graceland.)
1955	Martin D-28		April 1955 – October 1956	Purchased at O.K. Houck Piano Co. in Memphis, first used on April 16, 1955, in Dallas, fitted with a custom made tooled leather cover with his name, appeared on the cover of Presley's first album (Note: Soon after purchasing the 1955 Martin D-28, Presley received a custom-made tooled leather cover with his name across the front, made by Marcus Van Story in the basement of O.K. Houck Piano Co. where he worked occasionally repairing pianos. Presley admired a similar one used by Hank Snow. One of the most famous photos of Presley's 1955 Martin D-28 with the leather cover appeared on his first album, Elvis Presley, which was released March 23, 1956. Known as the "tonsil photo", it was cropped from a larger photograph taken during a performance on July 31, 1955 in Tampa, Florida by William V. "Red" Robertson.)
1956	Gibson J-200	A-22937	October 1956 – November 1970	Purchased through O.K. Houck Piano Co. in Memphis in October 1956, first used on October 11, 1956, at the Cotton Bowl in Dallas, used with a tooled leather cover on The Ed Sullivan Show in January 1957; made by Charles Underwood
1950s	Isana Jazz		1958 – 1960	Purchased by Lamar Fike in Bad Nauheim, Germany, a handmade German S hole jazz guitar used by Presley while serving in the U.S. Army
1960	Gibson J-200	A-32944	March 1960 – June 1968	Purchased through O.K. Houck Piano Co. in Memphis for his March 20, 1960 Nashville recording sessions while his original Gibson J-200 (A-22937) was being refinished and repaired, shipped to Scotty Moore c/o Chet Atkins, used for the Elvis 1968 Comeback Special
1968	Hagström Viking II		June 1968	Borrowed from session player Al Casey for several segments of the Elvis 1968 Comeback Special. Sold on April 7, 2021, at a GWS auction for $938,000, including buyer's fees (Aug 27, 2022)
1963	Gibson J-200 Ebony	61952	Mid 1960s – 1976	This guitar was given to Presley during a Nashville recording session at Studio B in the mid-1960s. Played on stage at the Las Vegas Hilton during the 1970s, the guitar has Presley's Kenpo karate patch attached to honor his friend, Ed Parker, the founder of Kenpo karate. (Note: In 1976, the Gibson J-200 Ebony was passed on to Presley's chief personal aide and Memphis Mafia member Marty Lacker at Graceland. Lacker was one of Presley's closest friends and served as the best man at his 1967 wedding in Las Vegas. Acquired directly from Marty Lacker, this guitar was formerly on display at the Elvis-a-Rama in Las Vegas, Nevada, for a number of years before being purchased in a private sale.)
1963	Gibson Super 400	62713	June 1968	Borrowed from Scotty Moore for the live segments of the Elvis 1968 Comeback Special, purchased from Gibson in October 1963 for $237 (US$2,434 in 2024 dollars).
1966	Gretsch Country Gentleman	80736	February 1970 – March 1970	Developed as a signature model by Gretsch for Chet Atkins, similar to the 1962 Gretsch 6122 Country Gentleman used by George Harrison for early Beatles performances and recordings
1969	Gibson Dove Ebony	539461	November 1971 – September 1973, July 1975	Given to audience member Mike Harris during a concert on July 24, 1975, in Asheville, North Carolina, saying, "This is yours. Hold on to that. Hopefully, it'll be valuable one day."
1968	Gibson J-200 Ebony	618195	March 1974 – July 1975	First used on March 1, 1974, in Tulsa, applied a Kenpo Karate decal to the body in September, thrown into the audience on July 15, 1975, at the Springfield Civic Center in Springfield, Massachusetts after breaking a string
1970s	Gibson Dove Custom	A004051 (Note: On March 16, 2003, a Gibson Dove Custom purportedly owned by Presley was auctioned in Los Angeles with documentation indicating, "Given by Presley's aunt Delta Mae Biggs to Don Wilson, 1977". The authenticity of the guitar has been questioned because the Grover Rotomatic tuners and the two screw truss rod cover do not correspond to photos of the guitar used by Presley. The guitar sold for $29,375.)	August 1975 – April 1976	First used on August 18, 1975, at the Hilton Hotel in Las Vegas, used exclusively on subsequent tours through April 27, 1976
1974	Guild F-50	96648	May 1976 – September 1976	First used on May 27, 1976, at Assembly Hall in Bloomington, Indiana.
1976	Martin D-35	377704	October 1976 – February 1977	
1975	Martin D-28	369735	February 1977 – June 1977	Used in his final live performance in Indianapolis, Indiana on June 26, 1977.

== Film guitars ==
The following is a list of "prop" guitars that Presley used on screen during musical numbers in his 31 theatrical films. These guitars were purchased by the studios, and in some cases, were identical to Presley's own performance guitars. The Gibson J-200 used in Loving You, King Creole, and G.I. Blues, for example, was identical to the Gibson J-200 he purchased in October 1956 (serial number A-22937).

Year	Film	Studio	Guitars	Notes
1956	Love Me Tender	Fox	Fox prop guitar	
1957	Loving You	Paramount	Gibson J-45; Gibson J-200	
1957	Jailhouse Rock	MGM	Stella H929; Maton HG100	
1958	King Creole	Paramount	Gibson J-45; Gibson J-200	
1960	G.I. Blues	Paramount	Gibson J-45; Gibson J-200; Harmony H950	
1960	Flaming Star	Fox	Fox prop guitar	
1961	Wild in the Country	Fox	Parlor style steel string	
1961	Blue Hawaii	Paramount	Gibson J-45; Soprano ukulele	
1962	Follow That Dream	UA	Old Kraftsman	
1962	Kid Galahad	UA	Old Kraftsman	
1962	Girls! Girls! Girls!	Paramount	Martin 0–17; Harmony H165	
1963	It Happened at the World's Fair	MGM	Gibson LG-1	
1963	Fun in Acapulco	Paramount	Harmony H950; Harmony H165; Classical guitar	
1964	Viva Las Vegas	MGM	Gibson LG-1; Fender Stratocaster	
1964	Kissin' Cousins	MGM	No guitar used	
1964	Roustabout	Paramount	Harmony H950	
1965	Girl Happy	MGM	Gibson LG-1; Fender Telecaster; Fender Precision Bass	
1965	Tickle Me	Allied Artists	Gibson J-200; Classical guitar	
1965	Harum Scarum	MGM	No guitar used	
1966	Frankie and Johnny	UA	Harmony H929TG; Stella Tenor	
1966	Paradise, Hawaiian Style	Paramount	Harmony H950	
1966	Spinout	MGM	Burns Double Six; Fender Precision Bass; Hoyer 12-String; Gibson LG-1; Gibson EBS-1250	
1967	Easy Come, Easy Go	Paramount	Fender Precision Bass; Gibson SG	
1967	Double Trouble	MGM	1960s Ampeg Baby Bass	
1967	Clambake	UA	Classical guitar Fender Electric XII; Fender Wildwood VI	
1968	Stay Away, Joe	MGM	No guitar used	
1968	Speedway	MGM	Fender Coronado II	
1968	Live a Little, Love a Little	MGM	Gibson LG-1	
1969	Charro!	National General	No guitar used	
1969	The Trouble with Girls	MGM	Kay dreadnought	
1969	Change of Habit	UA	Classical guitar Old Kraftsman; Harmony H162 style acoustic	

== Gallery ==
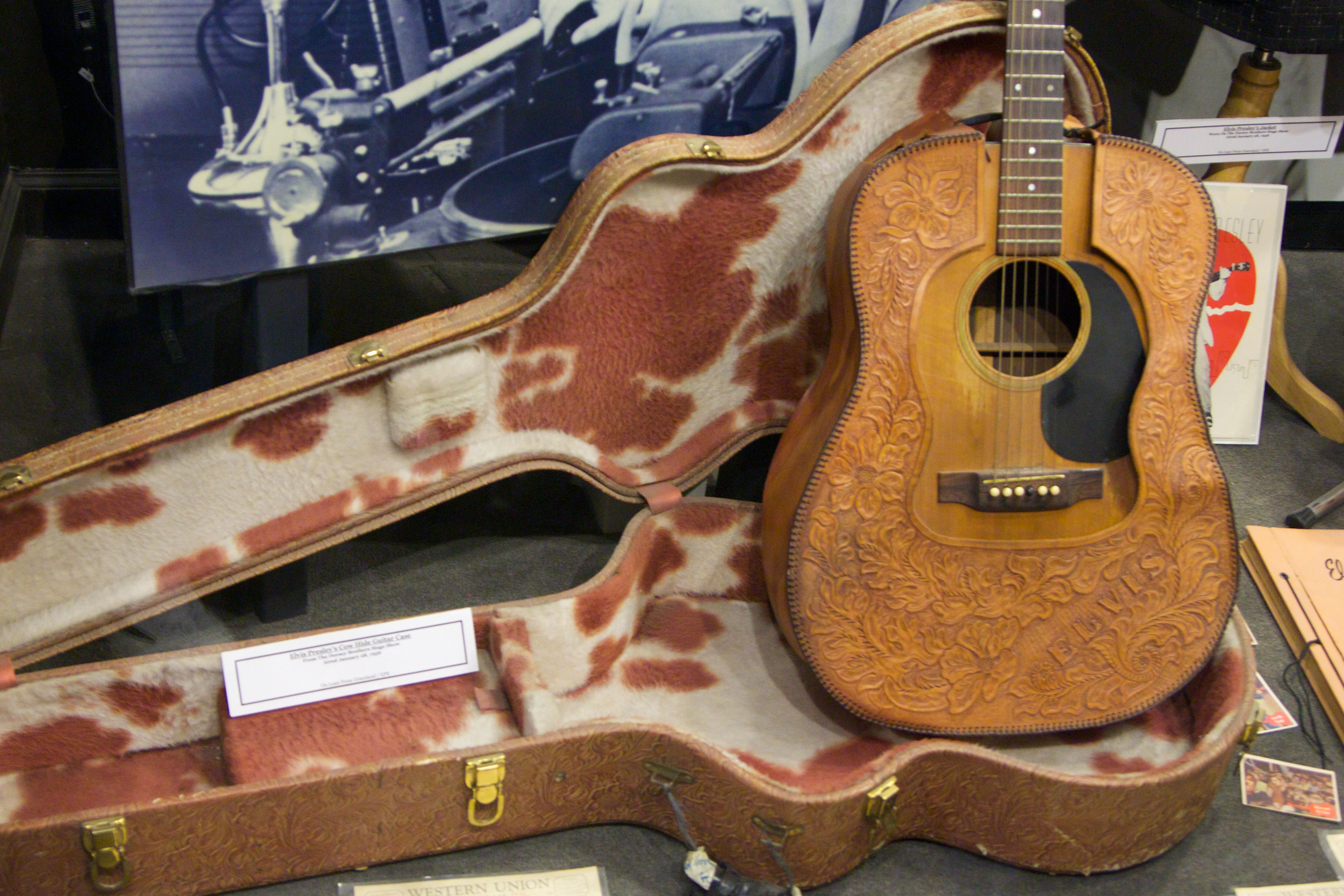
Martin D-28, The Dorsey Brothers Stage Show (1956)

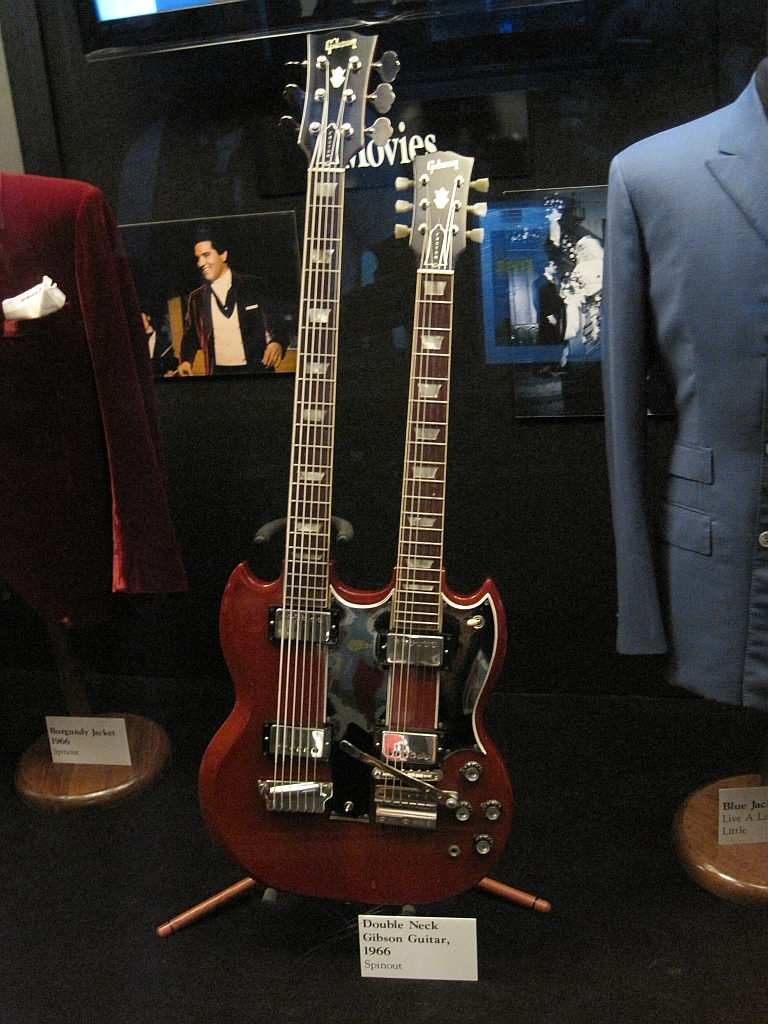
Gibson EBS 1250, Spinout (1966)

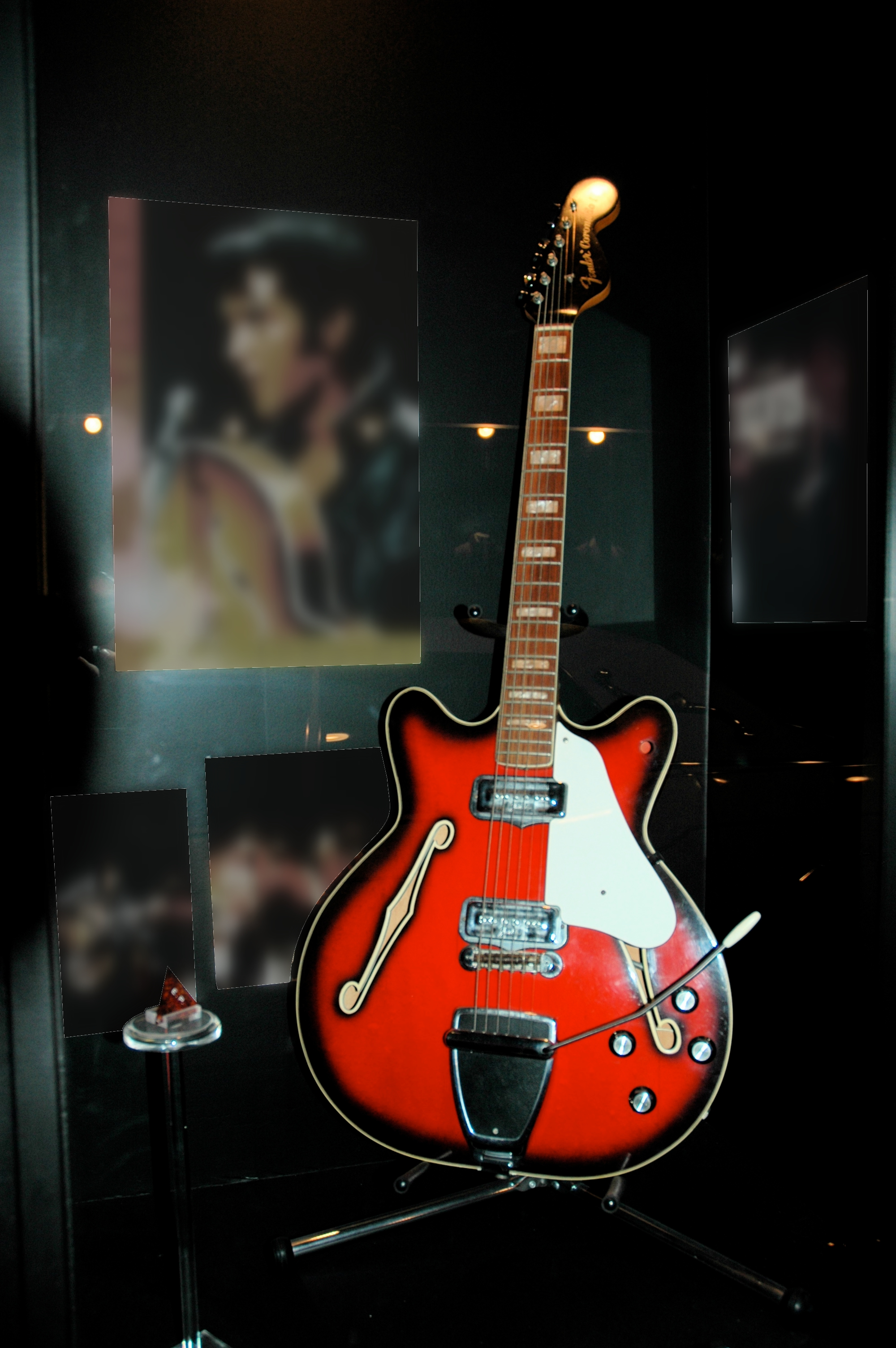
Fender Coronado II, Speedway (1968)

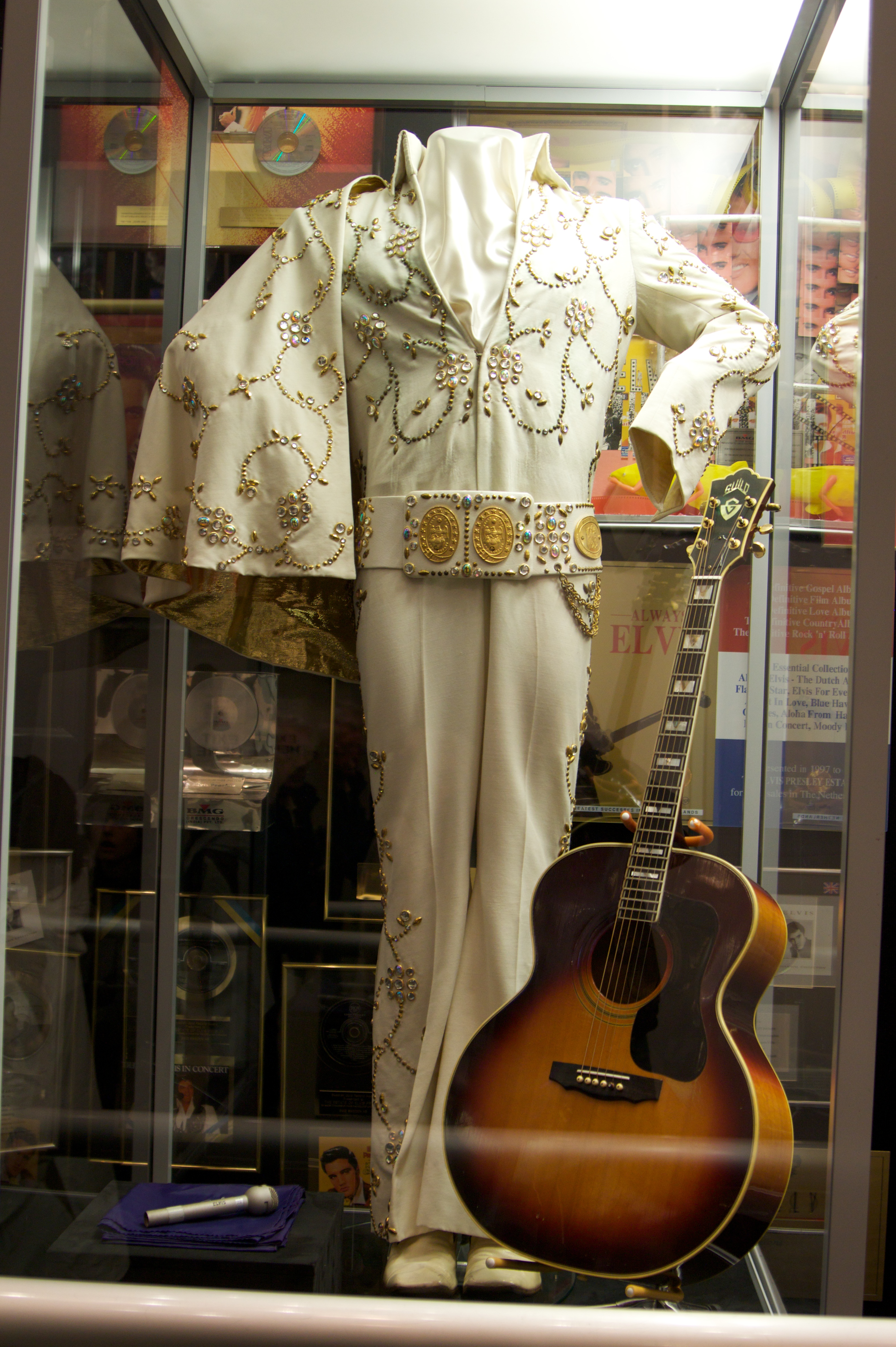
Guild F-50, live performances (1976)
