= Electromuse =

Former American instrument manufacturer

Electromuse was an American maker of musical instruments that operated in the 1940s and 1950s.

It was probably best known for its line of Hawaiian lap steel guitars. Electromuse also made Spanish acoustic guitars, hollowbody acoustic-electric guitars, and other stringed instruments. Vacuum tube instrument amplifiers manufactured by subcontractors such as Valco were also sold under the Electromuse brand, often as part of a package deal offered to consumers that included a lap steel guitar and matching amplifier in complementary colors. In his youth, steel player Curly Chalker, who performed and recorded with Willie Nelson, learned to play with an Electromuse lap steel, his first instrument. Duane Eddy's first instrument was an Electromuse lap steel.

Electromuse was an early adopter of electrified musical instruments and their patented Eye-Beam pickup was one of the first practical electromagnetic pickups on the market. The pickup converts the vibration of the instrument's metal strings in a magnetic field into an electrical signal that can be externally amplified (electromagnetic induction). Similar pickups are now commonplace on electric guitars and other electrified instruments. Electromuse promotional advertisements in 1946 touted the pickup's ability to "play all strings with equal power and richness of tone".

Valco manufactured many of the amplifiers that were sold under the Electromuse brand.
