= Airline Guitars =

Former consumer electronics brand

Airline Guitars USA, LLC.
- Type: Private
- Industry: Musical instruments
- Founded: 1923
- Headquarters: Chicago, Illinois, United States
- Area served: Worldwide
- Website: Airline Guitars Official Website

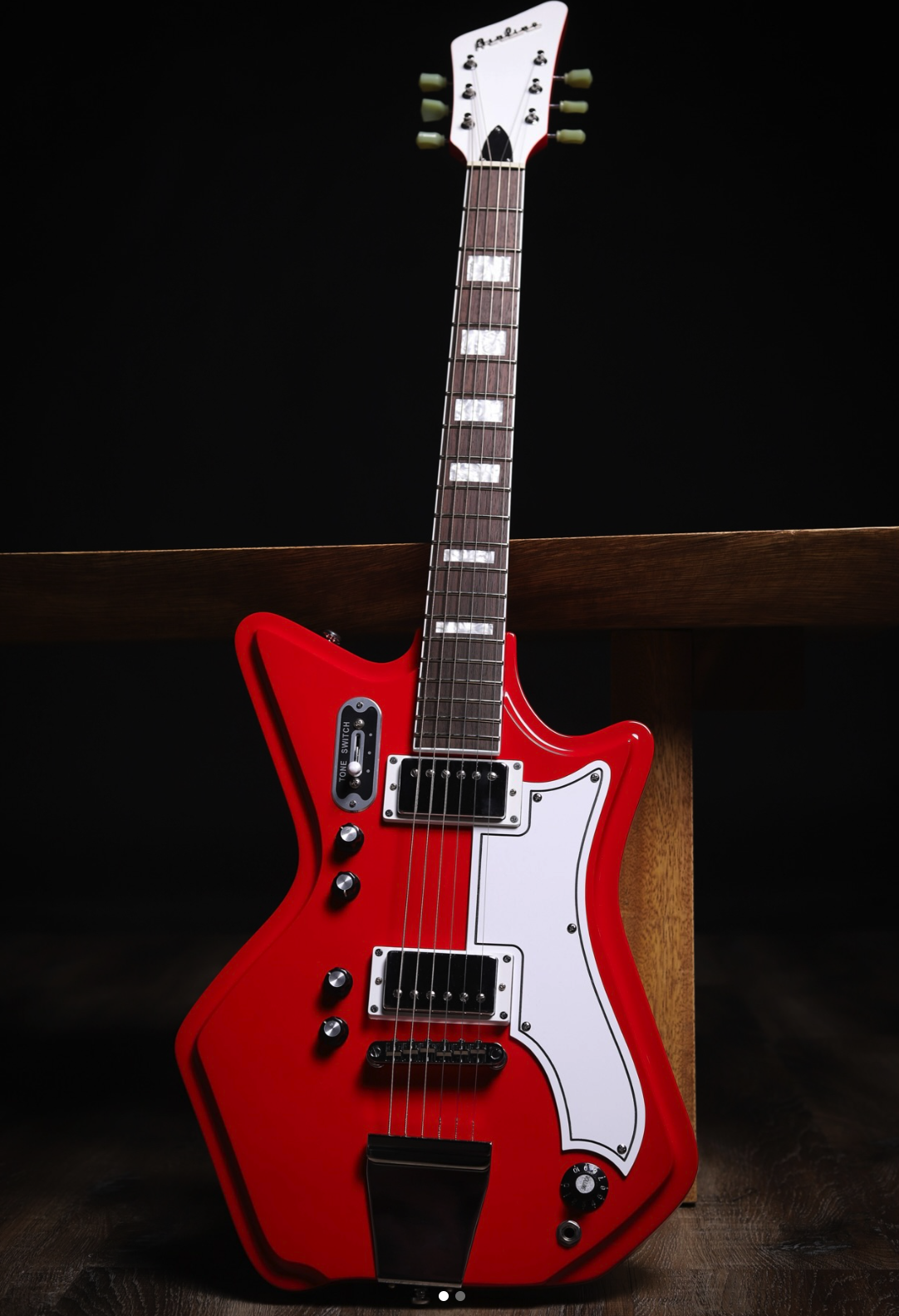
Airline Guitars Jetsons '59 2P

Airline Guitars is an independent musical instrument guitar company based in Chicago, Illinois. Originally introduced as a store brand by Montgomery Ward in 1923, Airline was produced from the late 1950s to the 1970s alongside a range of consumer electronics, including radios, televisions, and record players. In the early 2000s, Eastwood Guitars acquired the rights to the Airline brand and reissued several classic models. In 2024, Airline Guitars became an independent company under new family ownership in Chicago, dedicated to producing retro-inspired electric guitars, bass guitars, guitar amplifiers, and guitar accessories, blending vintage aesthetics with modern craftsmanship.

== Musical equipment ==
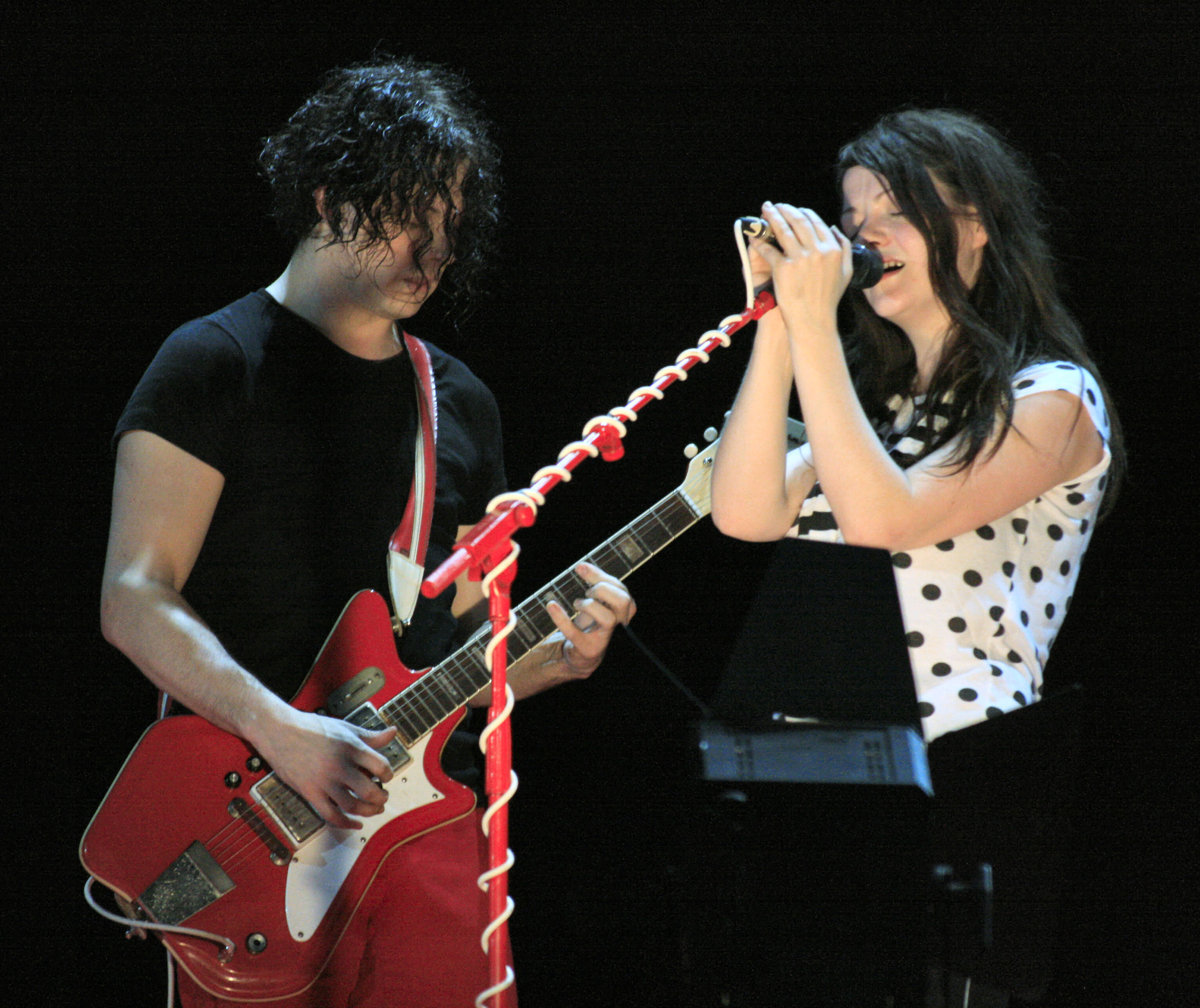
Jack White (The White Stripes) playing red Montgomery Ward Airline Res-O-Glas (a.k.a. J. B. Hutto, Jetsons)

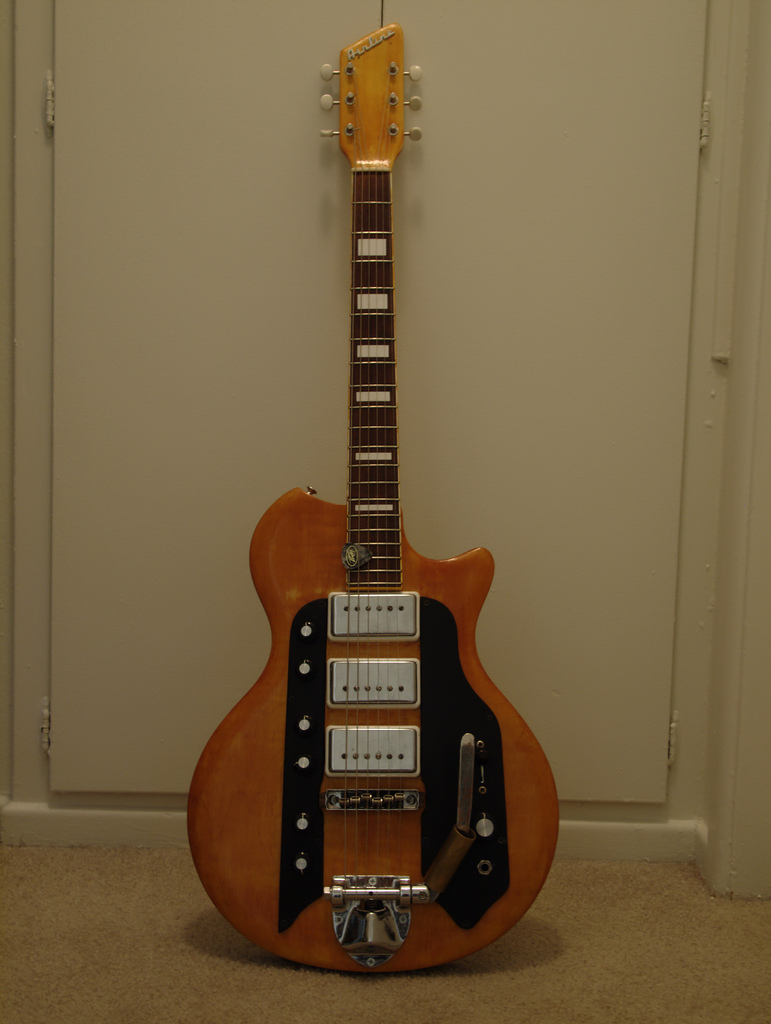
1962 Airline Town and Country (refinished)

The Airline brand was used by Montgomery Ward on a range of electric and acoustic guitars from 1958 to 1968. These were made in Chicago, Illinois, by the Valco Manufacturing Co., Kay Musical Instrument Company, and Harmony Company. Airline-branded amplifiers were manufactured by Valco and Danelectro.

Valco Airline guitars have been played by a wide array of bands and artists, including Jack White, J. B. Hutto, David Bowie, The Cure, PJ Harvey, Calexico, and Wooden Shjips.

=== Eastwood Guitars reissue ===
After Eastwood Guitars purchased rights to the "Airline" trade name in the early 2000s, they reissued the early 1960s "JB Hutto" Airline shape as the "Airline DLX." The new version set aside the defining hollow fiberglass body of the Valco-made original in favor of the simpler and less costly chambered mahogany body, giving it a more traditional electric guitar feel and tone, rather than the unique playing feel and response of the original.

Eastwood Guitars later released the "Airline '59 Custom" in two- and three-pickup models in December 2008, which come with striped pickguards and rubber-bound bodies, in the spirit of the originals.

=== Airline Guitars returns to Chicago ===
In October 2024, the "Airline" trade name was acquired by a family-owned business based in Chicago, Illinois. Specializing in retro-styled electric guitars, basses, amplifiers, effects pedals, and accessories, the new owners are committed to honoring the brand's legacy while introducing innovations that blend classic American design with modern functionality. With this transition, Airline Guitars returns to its Chicago roots, now operating independently from the Eastwood brand.
