= Kay Musical Instrument Company =

Musical instrument manufacturer in the US

- Type: Private (1931–1969); Brand (1969–present)
- Industry: Musical instruments
- Predecessor: Groeschel Mandolin Co. (1890-1921), Stromberg-Voisinet (1921-1931)
- Founded: 1931
- Founder: Henry "Kay" Kuhrmeyer
- Successor: Weiss Musical Instruments (1969-1980), The Kay Guitar Company (1980-present)
- Key people: Sidney M. Katz; Tony Blair
- Products: Electric, lap steel and acoustic guitars, double basses, violins, cellos, banjos, amplifiers
- Brands: List: Airline; Custom Kraft; Kay; Kamico; Kent; Old Kraftsman; Penncrest; Silvertone; Sherwood; Truetone
- Parent: Valco (1967–68)

Kay Musical Instrument Company (often referred to simply as Kay) is an American musical instrument manufacturer established in 1931 by namesake Henry "Kay" Kuhrmeyer and based in Chicago, Illinois. It was formed when Kuhrmeyer, with the support of his financial backers, bought out the instrument manufacturer Stromberg-Voisinet. They produced guitars, mandolins, banjos, ukuleles and were known for their use of lamination in the construction of arched top instruments.

The company operated independently until 1965 when they were purchased by the Seeburg Corporation, a jukebox manufacturer. In 1967, the company was sold to Valco citing decreasing profits due to imported Japanese instruments. In 1969, rights to name "Kay" was acquired by Weiss Musical Instruments (WMI) . The brand has been used by several manufacturers since then, mainly attached to Asian import guitars.

Kay offered their first electric guitar in 1936 — five years after the Rickenbacker Frying pan, and the same year as the Gibson ES-150. However, Kuhrmeyer with Stromberg-Voisinet had announced the "Stromberg Electro" even earlier, in 1928, possibly making the short-lived model the first commercial electric guitar. However, no copies exist, and there is speculation that the Electro was never produced. (Note: This skepticism seems hard to be consistent with the explicit product and price lists in the 1929 ads by major distributer CMI.)

== Overview ==
=== Early history (1890–1931) ===
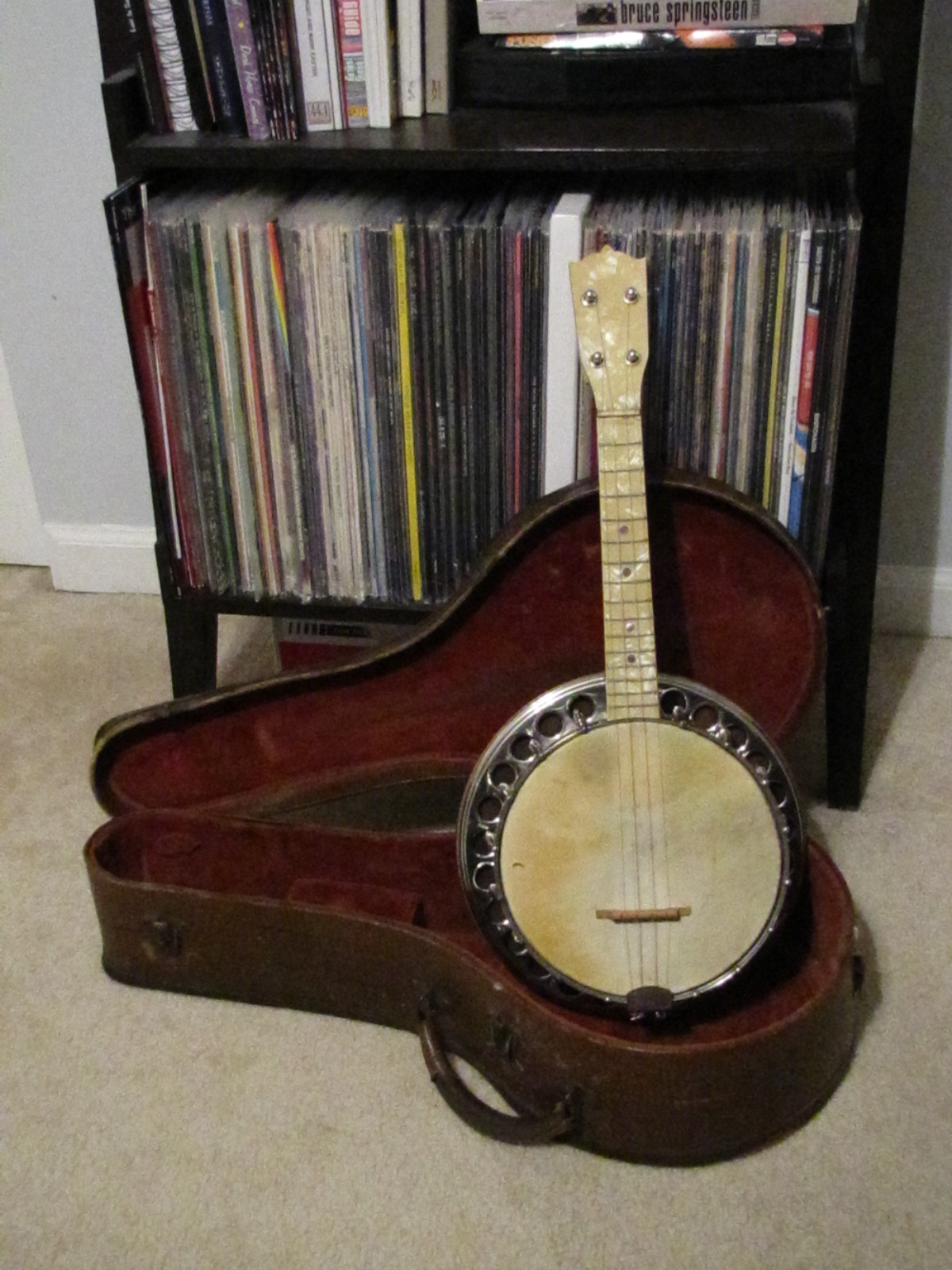
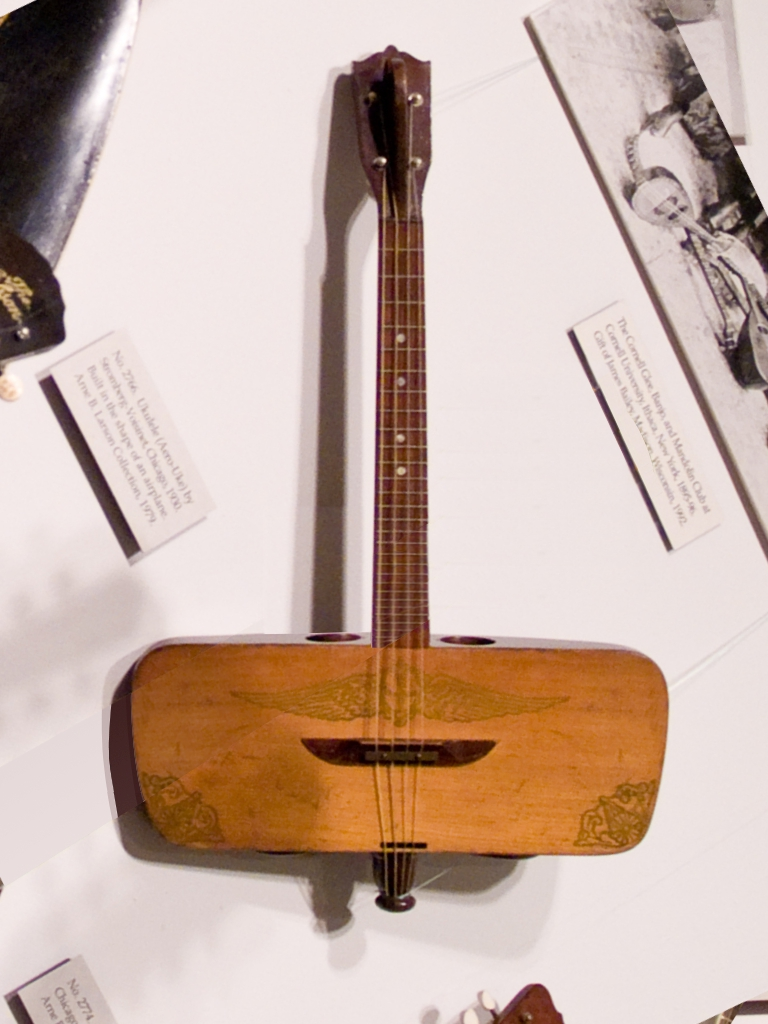
Products by Stromberg-Voisinet: Banjo uke and Aero-uke (c.1930)

The Kay Musical Instrument Company grew from the Andrew Groehsl Company (or Groehsl Mandolin Company) in Chicago, established in 1890. In 1921, Groehsl's company was purchased by Henry "Kay" Kuhrmeyer, Frank Voisinet, and Charles Stromberg and renamed to Stromberg-Voisinet. In 1928, with the help of an investor, Kuhrmeyer bought out his partners, renamed the company, and started producing electric guitars and amplifiers.

The new company, "Kay Musical Instruments" was formally established in 1931. As its predecessor had primarily commercialized its products under its own brand as well as a large number of other brands, Kay Musical Instruments would continue that practice.

=== Activity on Kuhrmeyer-era (1931–1955) ===
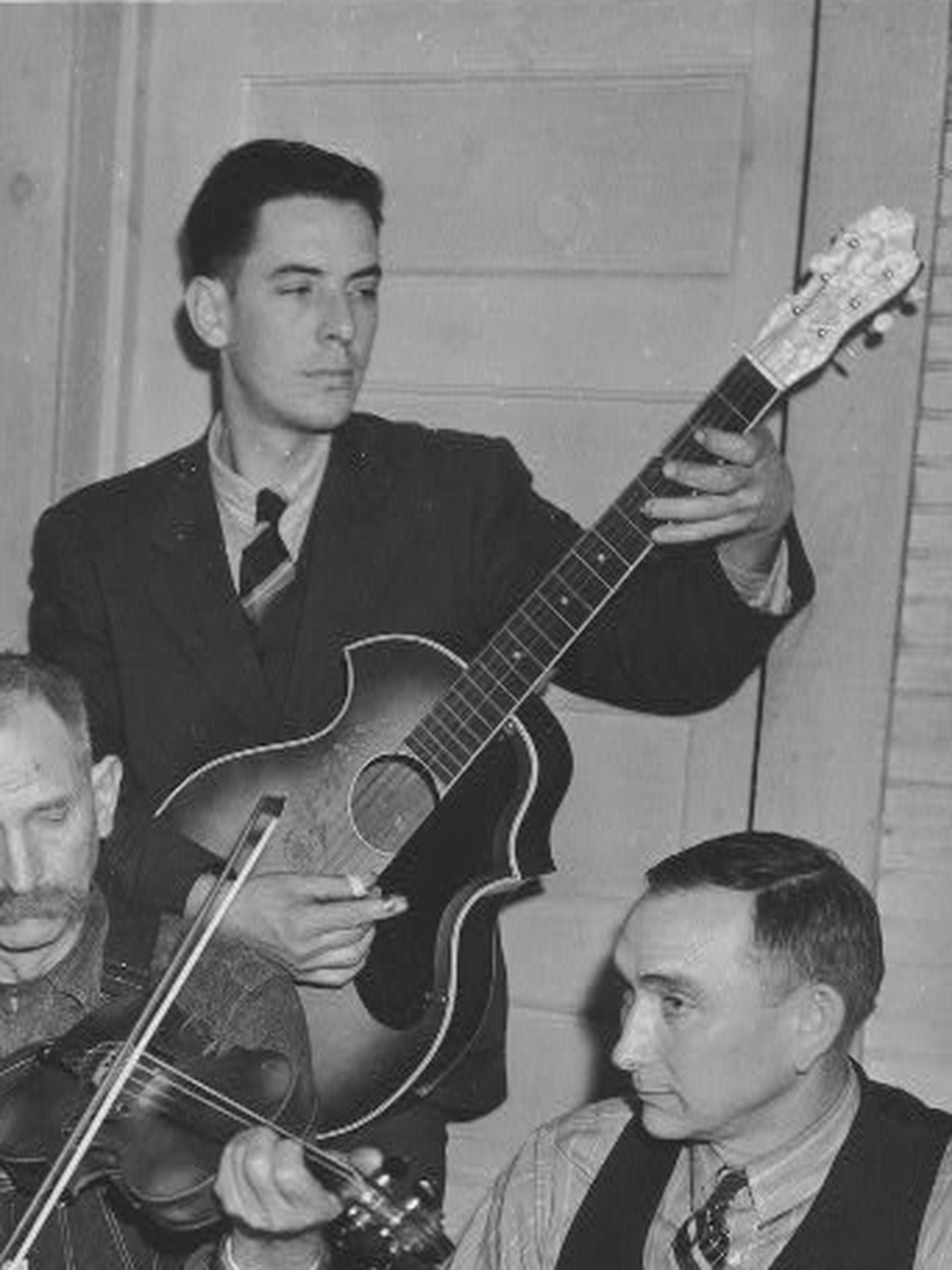
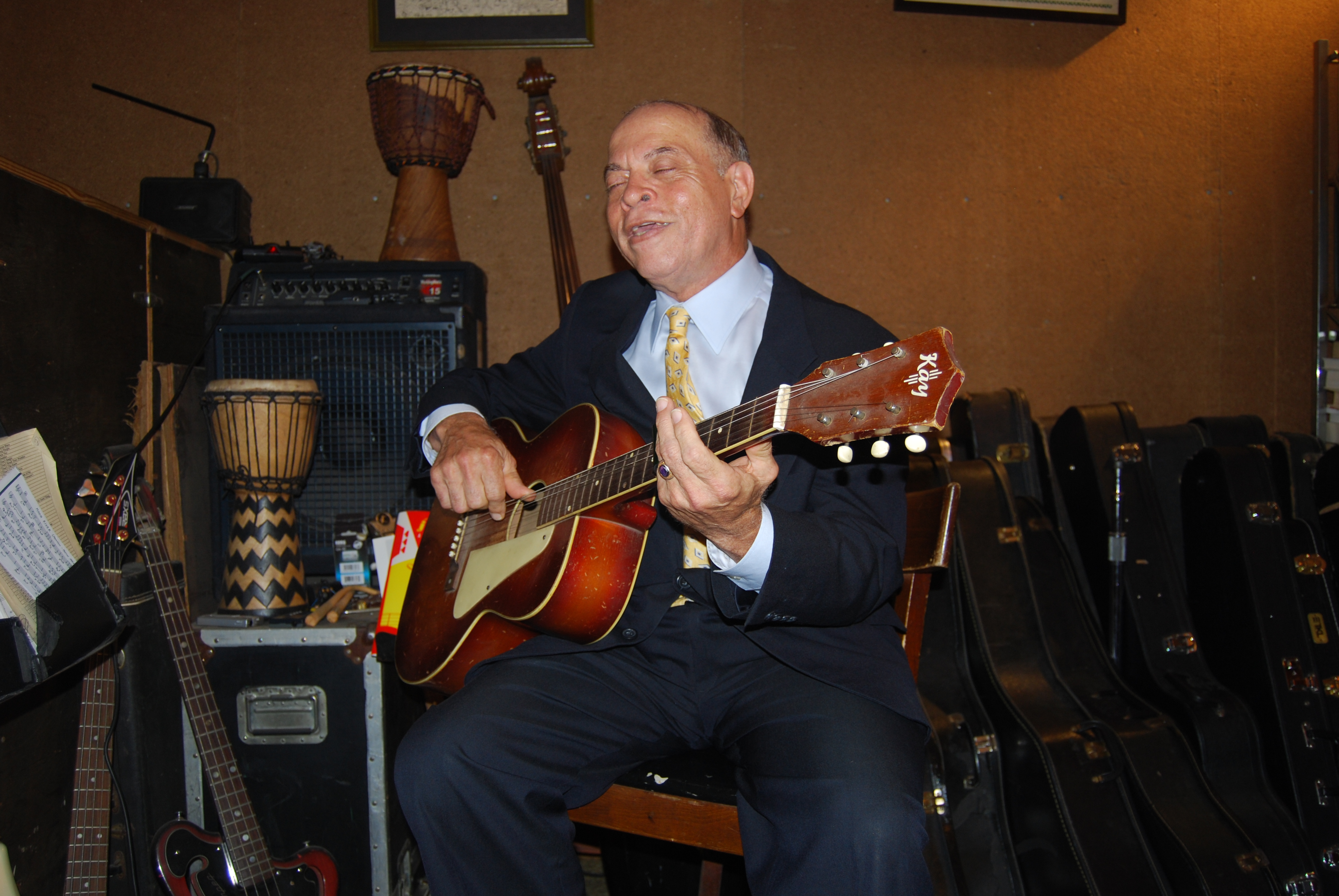
left: Kay Kraft Venetian guitar, played by Fields Ward of The Bog Trotters Band in 1937. right: Kay acoustic guitar, played by Deacon John Moore in 2009.

The company initially manufactured only traditional folk instruments such as mandolins, tenor guitars and banjos, but eventually grew to make a wide variety of stringed instruments, including violins, cellos, double basses and a variety of different types of guitars, including electric, classical, lap steel and semi-acoustic models.

In addition to manufacturing instruments for sale under its own brands (like Kay Kraft and Kamico), Kay was also a manufacturer of guitars for retailers who would order instruments with custom branding to be resold as "house brand" instruments.

Kay also made guitar amplifiers, beginning with designs carried over from the old Stromberg company. Kay eventually subcontracted its amplifier production to Chicago music industry rival Valco in the 1950s.

=== Electric-shift & Decline on Katz-era (1955–1968) ===
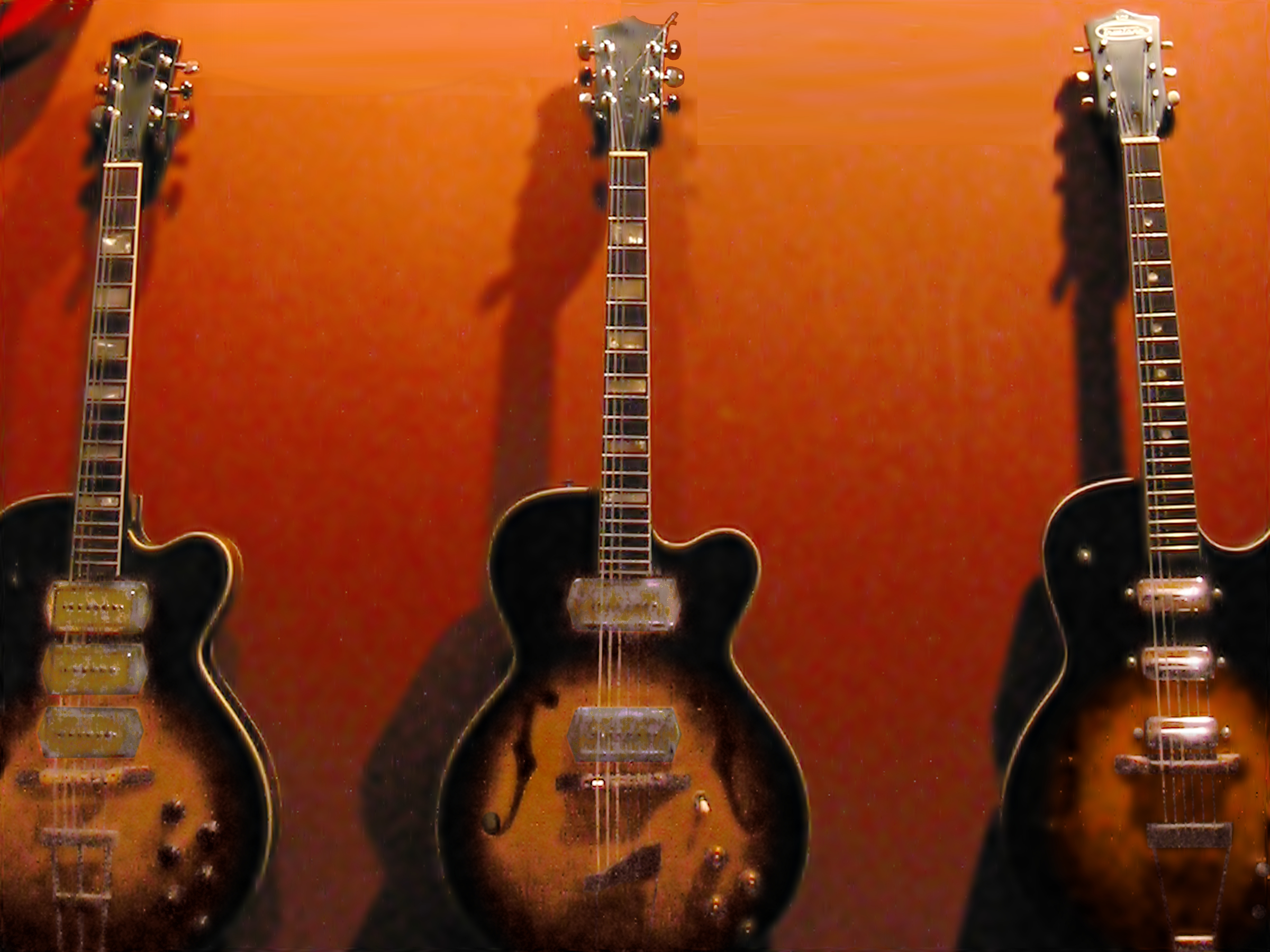
Kay's archtop electric guitars in 1961: (L to R) Swing Master K673, K672, Truetone Jazz King

After the retirement of Kuhrmeyer in 1955, the company was taken over by Sidney M. Katz. The product line of Kay was shifted toward electric musical instruments on demands, and in 1964, the company moved to a new factory in Elk Grove Village, Illinois. In 1965 Katz sold Kay to Seeburg Corporation, and he became the head of Seeburg's musical instrument division. In 1967, Kay was resold and merged with Valco, but dissolved in 1968 due to financial problems.

=== Revival (1969–present) ===
The assets of Kay/Valco were auctioned off in 1969. The upright bass and cello lines were sold to Engelhardt-Link, a new company formed by a previous Valco member, which has continued production. The Kay name (and some of its trademarks, such as Knox) were acquired by Teisco, Weiss Musical Instruments, Sylvain Weindling, and Barry Hornstein, who put the Kay name on the Teisco products beginning in 1973, and continued on through the 1970s.

In 1980, A.R. Enterprises (Tony Blair) purchased the Kay trademark. In 2008–2009, The "Kay Guitar Company" of California reissued 12 models of vintage Kay guitars and basses manufactured by Fritz Brothers Guitars. As of 2013, production and sales of these guitars have continued.

== Kay guitars ==
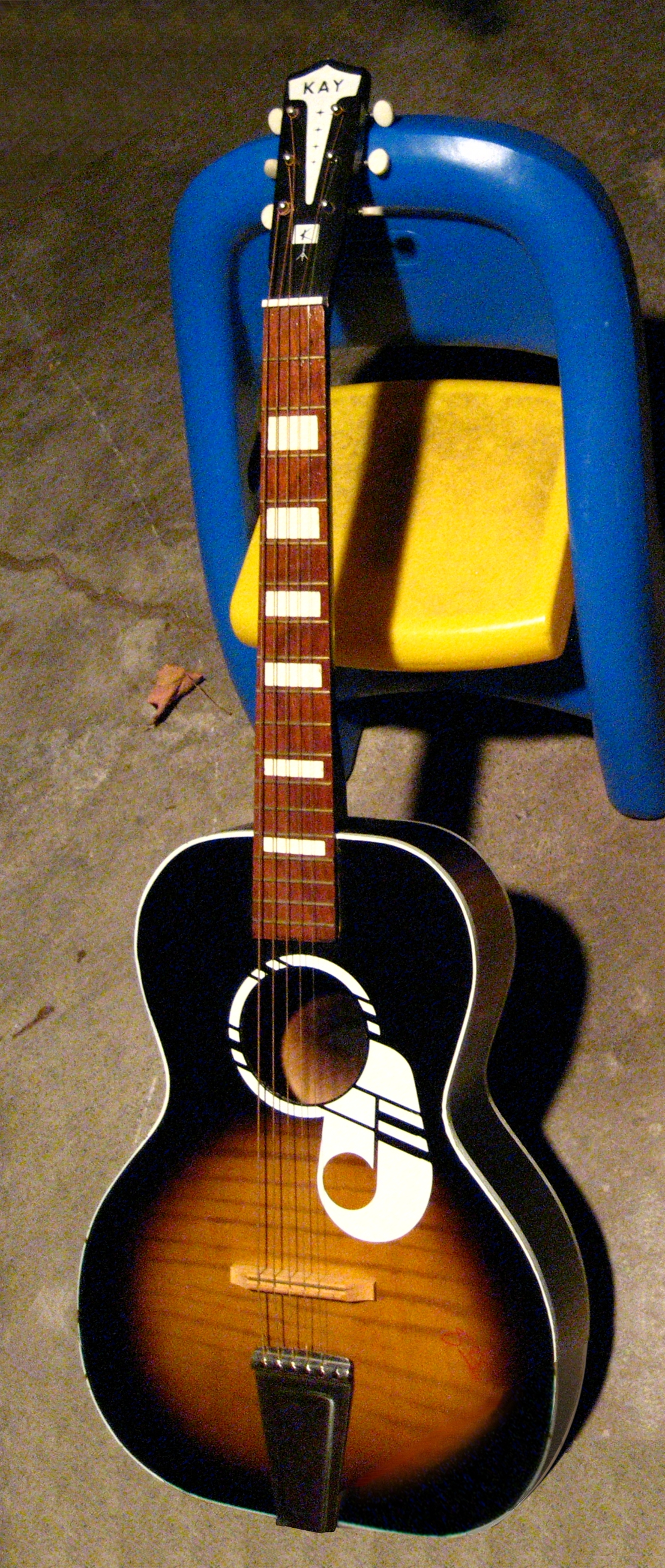
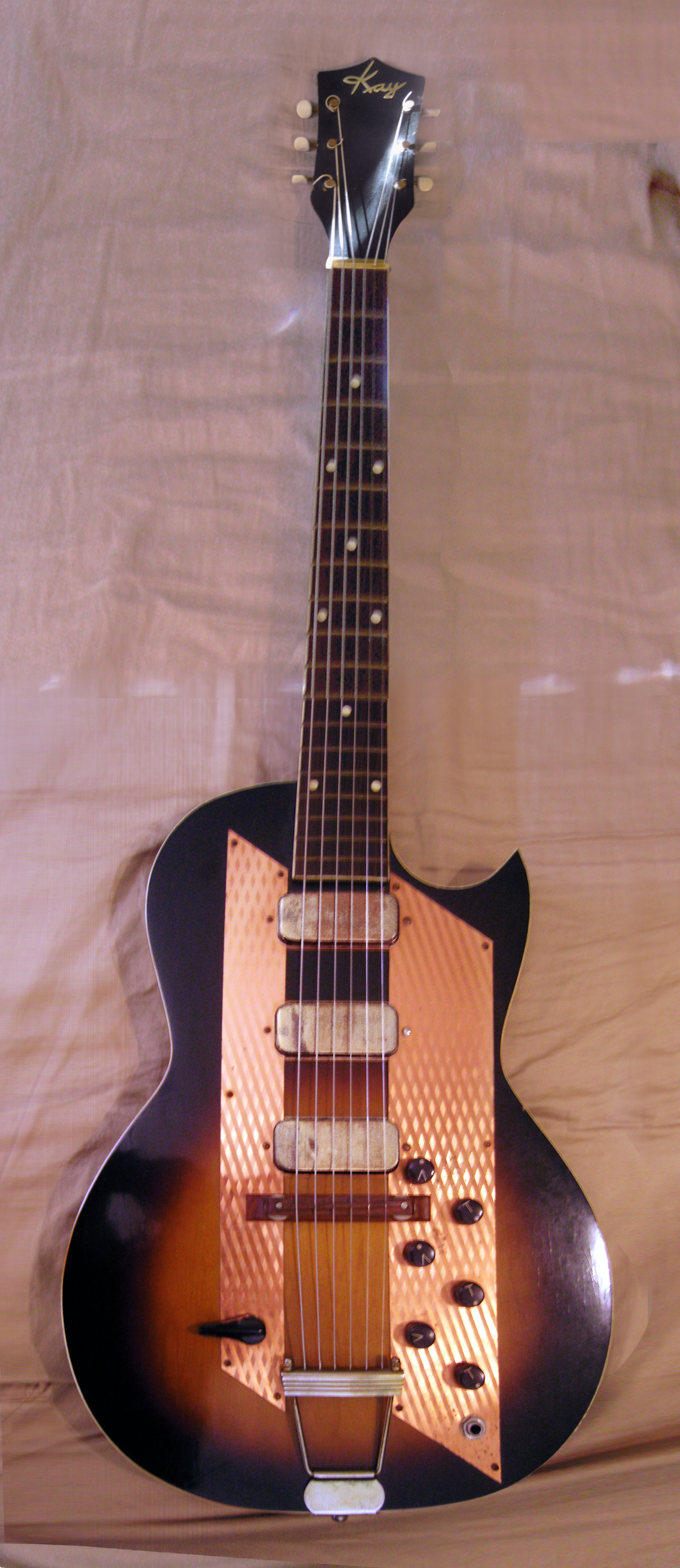
left: K1160 parlor guitar (c.1966)
right: Style Leader #1983 (c.1960)

Kay is best known for their large production of student-grade, budget instruments but also built higher quality instruments that were used by professional artists of the time including a line of electric guitars endorsed by Barney Kessel. Kay sold guitars under their own name as well as a plethora of brand names such as Silvertone for Sears, Sherwood and Airline for Montgomery Ward, Old Kraftsman for Spiegel, Rex for Gretsch, Custom Kraft for St. Louis Music Supply Company, Truetone for Western Auto, 'Penncrest' for JC Penney, etc.

The current line of Kay instruments sold by A.R. Enterprises include low-priced acoustic, electric and bass guitars, and moderately priced banjos, ukuleles, mandolins and resonators. All imported from China.

=== K-161 Thin Twin guitar and K-162 Electronic Bass ===
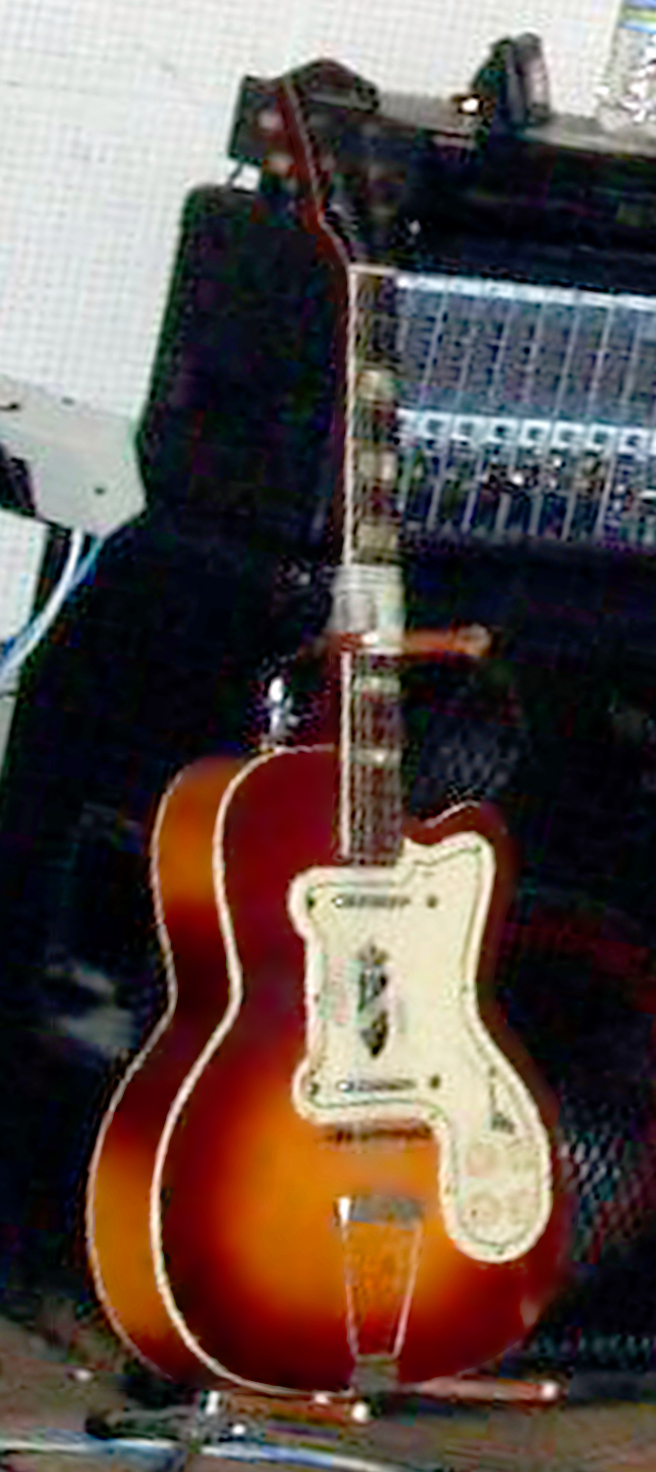
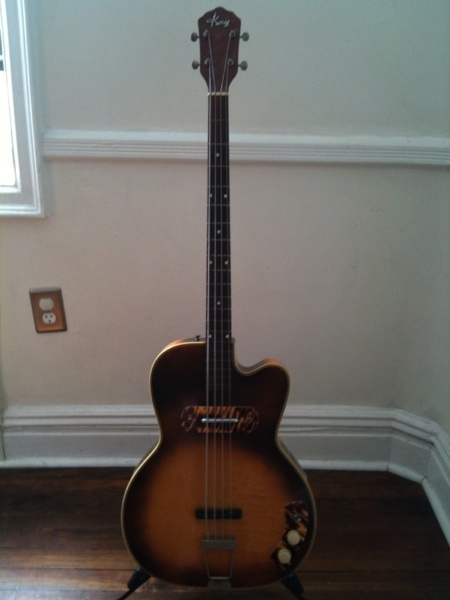
left: K-161 Thin Twin (1952-?)
right: K-162 Electronic Bass (1952–59/1966)

One of the best known Kay electric guitars during the 1950s was the K-161 Thin Twin, most visibly used by blues artist Jimmy Reed. This instrument debuted in 1952, and featured a single cutaway body, a distinctive "fire stripe" tortoiseshell pickguard, and a pair of thin blade-style pickups.

Also in 1952, Kay introduced the matching K-162 "Electronic" Bass, which was the first commercially available thinline-hollowbody electric bass guitar, and the second production electric bass guitar after the Fender Precision Bass debuted in 1951. Due to the use of K-162 by a bassist of Howlin' Wolf, Andrew "Blueblood" McMahon, it is commonly known as the "Howlin Wolf" bass. These instruments are believed to be the first semi-hollow electrics (i.e., thinline-hollowbody electric with solid center-block), predating the Gibson ES-335 by six years. Their unique design featured a flat top with no f-holes, a free-floating arched back, and two braces running along the top. The result was a semi-acoustic instrument that was feedback-resistant while retaining natural acoustic resonances. In 1954, Kay added the K-160 bass to its catalog with baritone tuning, according to the catalog, "tuned like the first four guitar strings but one octave lower." Structurally this bass was basically same as K-162 bass, except for the higher pitched tuning and the addition of a white pickguard.

In the late 1950s, various guitars in the Kay line were assigned new model numbers; according to the 1959 catalog, the Thin Twin became K5910 and the Electronic Bass became K5965. Both instruments remained in Kay's catalog offerings with only minor cosmetic variations until 1966, when Kay revamped its entire guitar line to only feature budget instruments. Kay also manufactured versions of the Thin Twin guitar under the Silvertone (Sears) and Old Kraftsman (Spiegel) brands.

=== Gold "K" Line ===
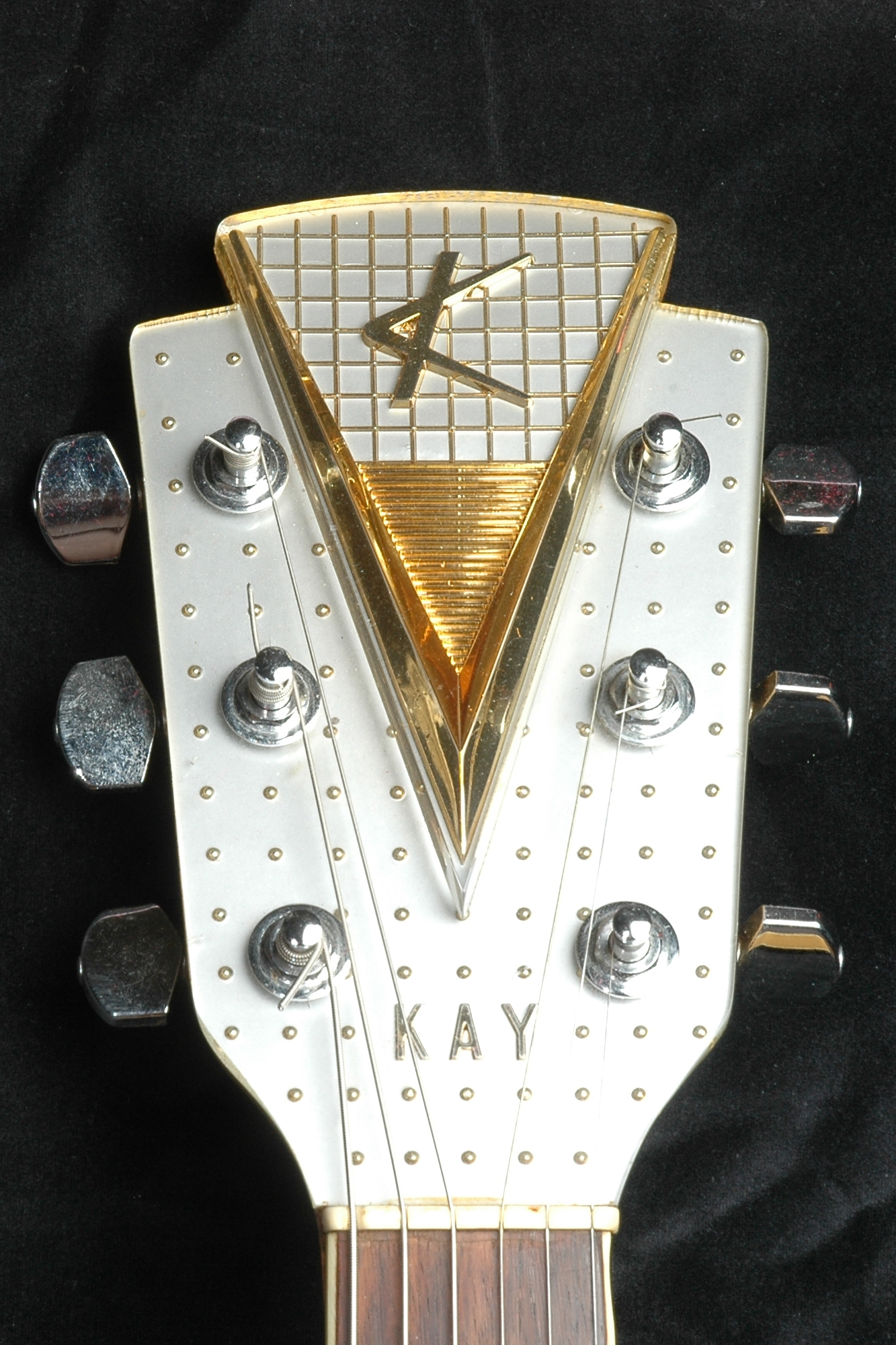
Gold "K" headstock

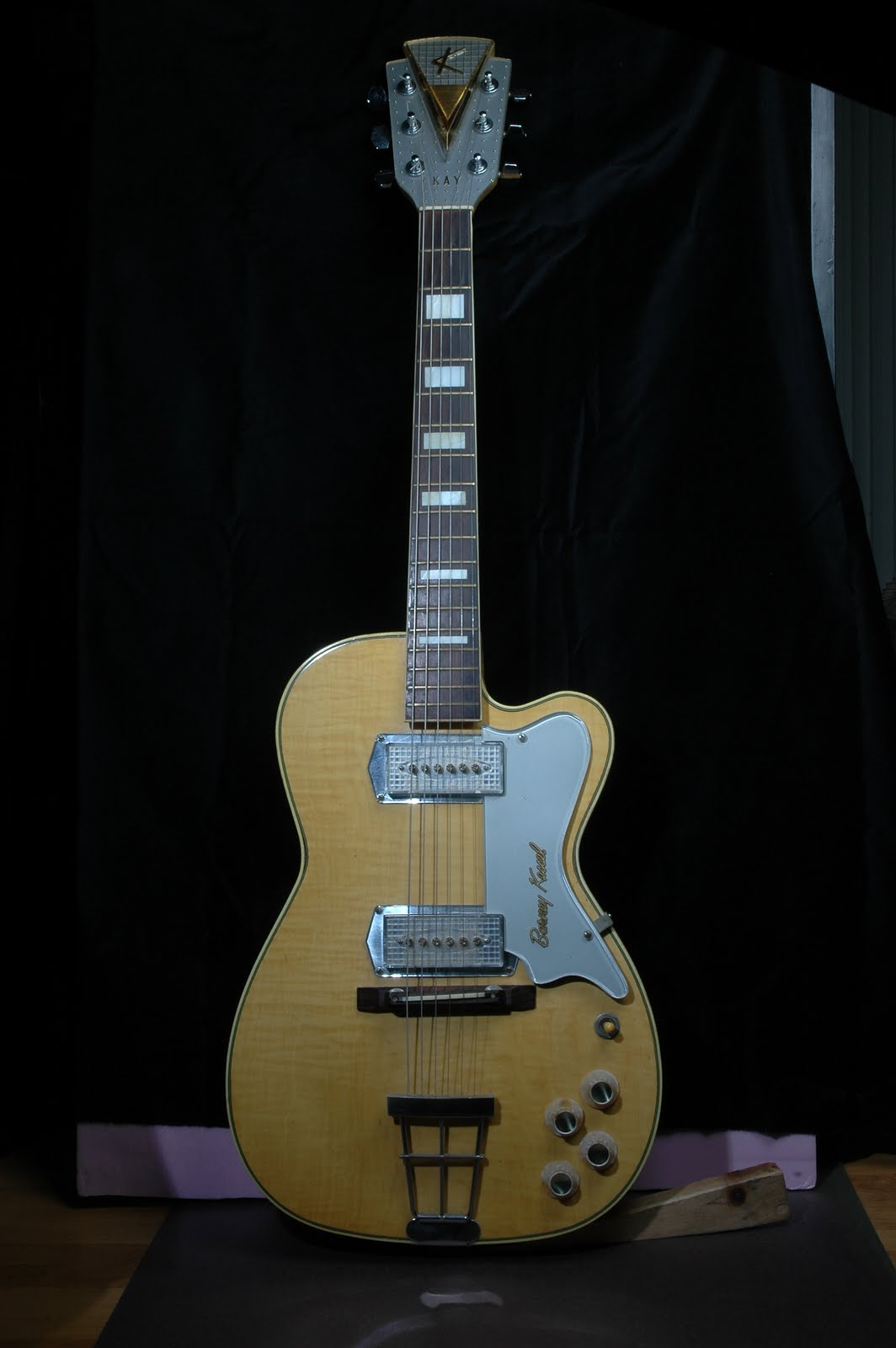
Barney Kessel Pro (1957–1962)

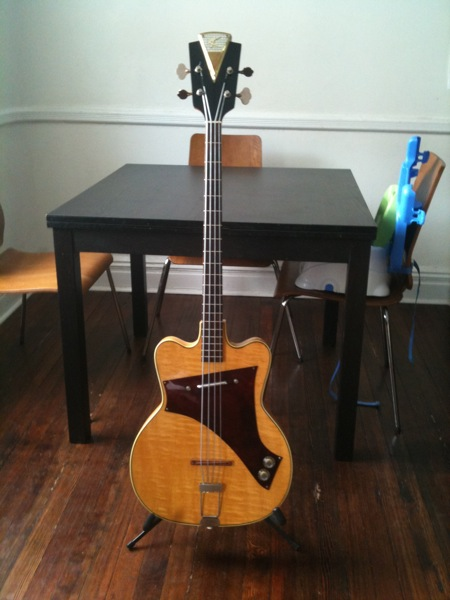
Jazz Special Bass (1957–1962)

In 1957, president Sydney Katz introduced the Gold "K" line of archtop and solid body electric guitars to compete with major manufacturers like Fender, Gibson, and Gretsch. The gold "K" Line featured the Jazz Special, Artist, Pro, Upbeat, Jazz II, and Jazz Special Bass. Gold "K" guitars used the same hardware as top manufacturers. However, there were truss rod and neck issues. Kay's "Thin Lite" truss rods introduced on mid-tier instruments in the 1960s often become dislodged and inoperable. They may be repaired by a luthier.

Gold models had single coil pickups with clear silver plastic covers and phillips head bolt adjustable pole pieces. The Upbeat model came with an optional transparent black plastic cover. The Jazz Special Bass has a single blade pickup as used on the K-161 and K-162 (tilted slightly towards the neck at the treble side), as well as a distinctive, oversized headstock.

Valued among collectors, the headstocks from 1957 to 1960 featured a reverse painted plastic overlay similar to the Kelvinator logo. The guitars featured art deco patterns. It was difficult to get players to take Kay's high end entry seriously, and Kay discontinued the Gold line in 1962.

== Kay basses ==
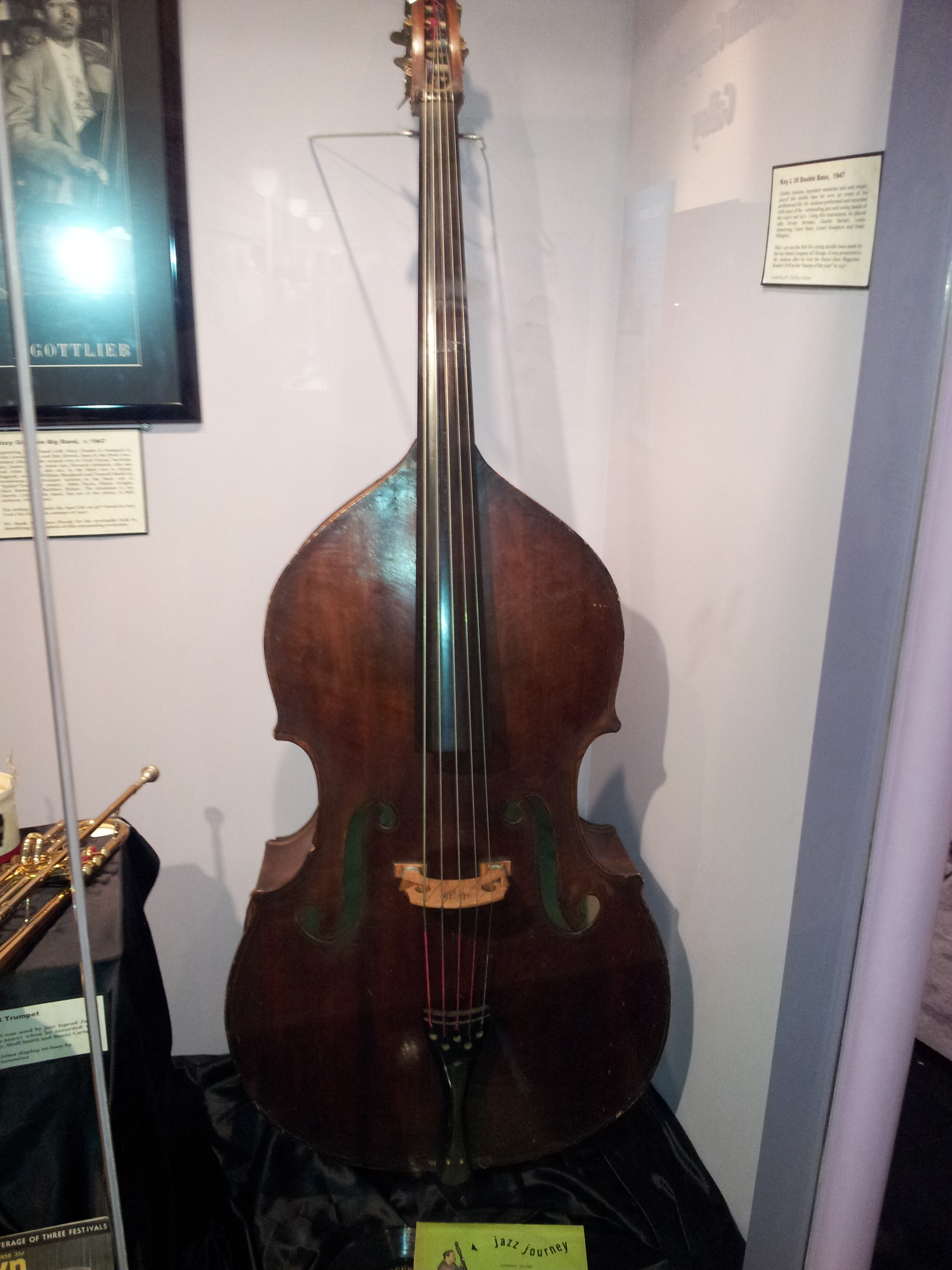
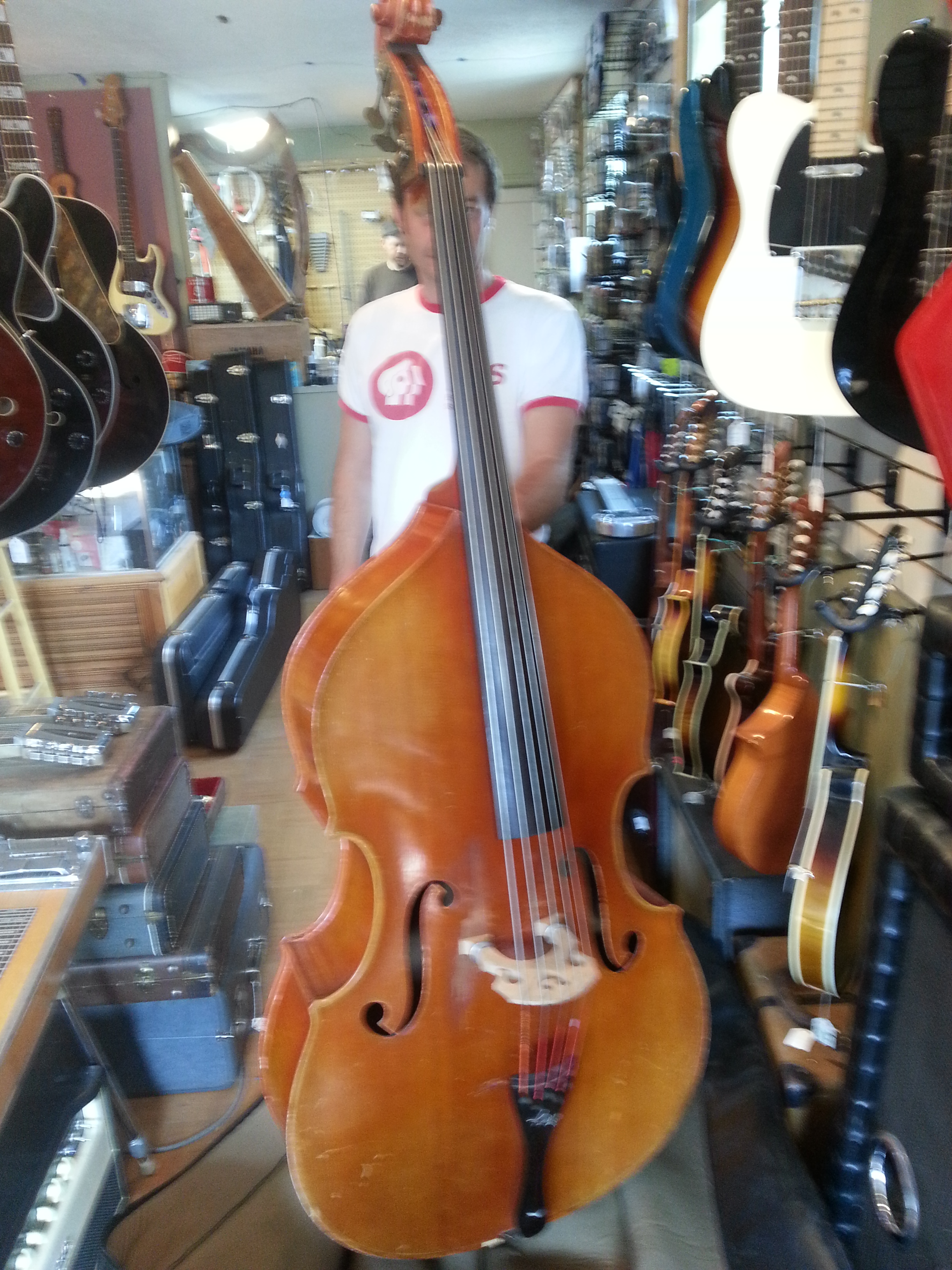
left: Kay L-30 (1947) played by Chubby Jackson. right: Kay S-51 5-string (c. 1940)

In 1937, Kay began to produce a 3/4 size upright bass, which is widely believed to be their Concert or C-1 bass. Like their guitar manufacturing, the basses were hand crafted by skilled craftsmen using special ordered machinery. They even had a hot stamping machine that could emboss the trademark KAY cursive script.

After the dissolve of Kay/Valco in 1968, the Engelhardt-Link Company bought the upright bass and cello lines at the asset auction in 1969, and continue to produce the same instrument lines until today. Manufactured in Elk Grove Village, Illinois, Engelhardt basses and cellos are sturdy instruments, widely used by students and touring professionals. The ES9 Swingmaster bass (formerly the Kay S9 Swingmaster), is highly thought-of by jazz, swing, and bluegrass musicians. In August 2019 Upton Bass String Instrument Company purchased the bass and cello-making equipment, formerly owned by Kay, from Engelhardt-Link.

== Notable players ==
- Alvin Youngblood Hart (Note: American blues guitarist/songwriter.)
- Anne Erin Clark (Note: Singer/songwriter for the group St. Vincent.)
- Arthur Crudup
- Barney Kessel (Note: American jazz/blues guitarist/session musician prominent in the 1950s and 1960s. Kessel endorsed the Kay "Jazz Special", "Artist" and "Pro" guitars. As of 2016 the Barney Kessel name has been assigned exclusive manufacturing rights with the Kay Guitar Company. Kay is now reissuing the 1960s signature models (Barney Kessel Pro, Barney Kessel Artist, Barney Kessel Jazz Special). Contrary to some misleading stories, Barney Kessel often played Kay Guitars and can be seen on video playing a Kay Jazz Special Guitar on the TV series Johnny Staccato, "Television's Jazz Detective".)
- Beck
- Big Joe Williams
- Bill Black (Note: Upright bassist for Elvis Presley. Can be heard on "Heartbreak Hotel" and many other classic Elvis Presley recordings.)
- Bob Casale (Devo)
- Bob Dylan
- Brad Paisley
- Brad Whitford
- Bruce Springsteen (Note: Bought his first guitar at a Western Auto Store for 18 dollars.)
- Buddy Guy
- Chet Atkins
- Chuck Berry
- Darryl Jones (The Rolling Stones)
- Dave Grohl
- Elmore James
- Elvis Costello
- Elvis Presley (Note: His first guitar was a 1947 Kay flat top K19 purchased at Tupelo Hardware by his mother Gladys as a birthday present.)
- Eric Clapton
- Gaby Moreno
- Gary Moore
- George Harrison
- Howlin' Wolf
- Jack White
- James Hetfield
- Jeff Tweedy
- Jerry Garcia
- Jimi Hendrix (Note: Played a 1967 white Kay electric "Strat" copy.)
- Jimmy Reed (Note: Reed's guitar tone is the most famous example of the unique, thick & biting "Kay sound.".)
- Jimmy Vivino
- Joan Jett
- Joe Hill Louis
- Joe Walsh
- John Fogerty
- John Lee Hooker
- Keith Richards
- Louis Allen
- Mark Knopfler
- Mike Rutherford (Note: Used a Kay Speed Demon in the music video for the Genesis song I Can't Dance.)
- Patterson Hood
- Paul McCartney (Note: Played a black K5970 Kay Jazz Special Bass guitar on Wings' Red Rose Speedway album. This Bass also appears in the official music videos for "Junior's Farm" and "Ebony and Ivory".)
- Paul Stanley
- Pete Townshend
- Phil Alvin
- Randy Jackson
- Robert DeLeo and Dean DeLeo (Stone Temple Pilots)
- Robert Pete Williams
- Roscoe Holcomb
- Rudy Sarzo
- Ry Cooder
- Sarah McLachlan
- Shark
- Sheryl Crow
- T Bone Burnett (Note: Known for playing the Kay K161 Thin Twin electric guitar http://kayvintagereissue.com/vintageplayers.php.)
- Tom Morello
- Tom Petersson
- Tom Petty

== See also ==
- Silvertone
- Airline
- Teisco
- Seeburg Corporation
- Valco
- Harmony Company

== Bibliography ==
- Scott, Jay (1992). 50's Cool: Kay Guitars. Second String Press. pp. 64 pages. ISBN 978-1-880422-01-4.
- Fjestad, Zach. "Kay [acoustic guitars]". Blue Book of Acoustic Guitar Values. Blue Book Publications, Inc.
  "Source: 1950s/1960s company history courtesy Jay Scott, 50's Cool: Kay Guitars, contemporary history courtesy Michael Wright, Vintage Guitar Magazine, individual model listings: Michael Wright, Guitar Stories, Volume Two."
  See also: Kay (electric guitars), Kay Kraft (electric guitars), Kay Kraft (acoustic guitars), Mayflower (acoustic guitars).
