= Valco =

American guitar manufacturer

- Type: Private
- Industry: Musical instruments
- Founded: 1940
- Founder: Victor Smith, Al Frost, and Louis Dopyera
- Defunct: 1968; 58 years ago
- Headquarters: United States
- Products: Electric and acoustic guitars, amplifiers
- Brands: Airline; National; Oahu (Note: Oahu Publishing Company, founded and presided by Harry Stanley, was a musical instruments and accessories distributor. Based in Cleveland, Ohio, the company commercialised guitars (mainly from Supro), amplifiers and imported accordions as well.); Supro

Valco was a US manufacturer of guitar amplifiers from the 1940s through 1968.

Apart from its original products, Valco also commercialised electric and acoustic guitars and basses through its subsidiary companies.

== History ==
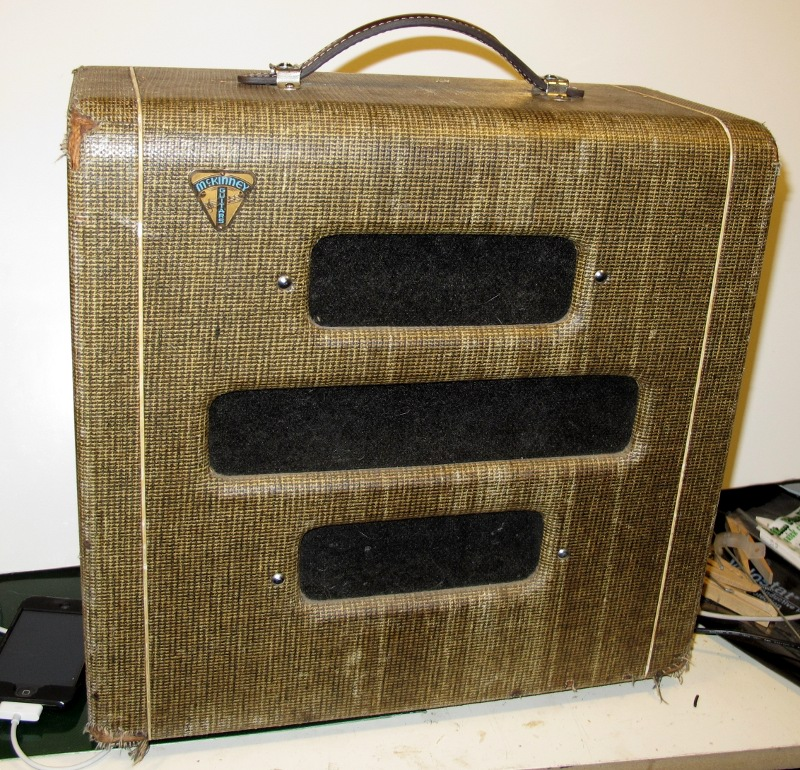
1940s Valco amplifier, made for McKinney School of Music

Valco was formed in 1940 by three business partners and former owners of the National Dobro Company; Victor Smith, Al Frost, and Louis Dopyera. The company name was a combination of the three partner's first initials (V.A.L.) plus the common abbreviation for company (Co.)

Valco manufactured and sold electric (since the 1950s), resonator, lap steel and classical guitars and vacuum tube amplifiers under a variety of brand names including Supro, Airline, National and Oahu. They also made amplifiers under contract for several other companies such as Gretsch, Harmony, and Kay.

Valco merged with Kay Musical Instrument Company in 1967; however financial difficulties forced the merged company to fold the following year.

== Replicas and revivals ==
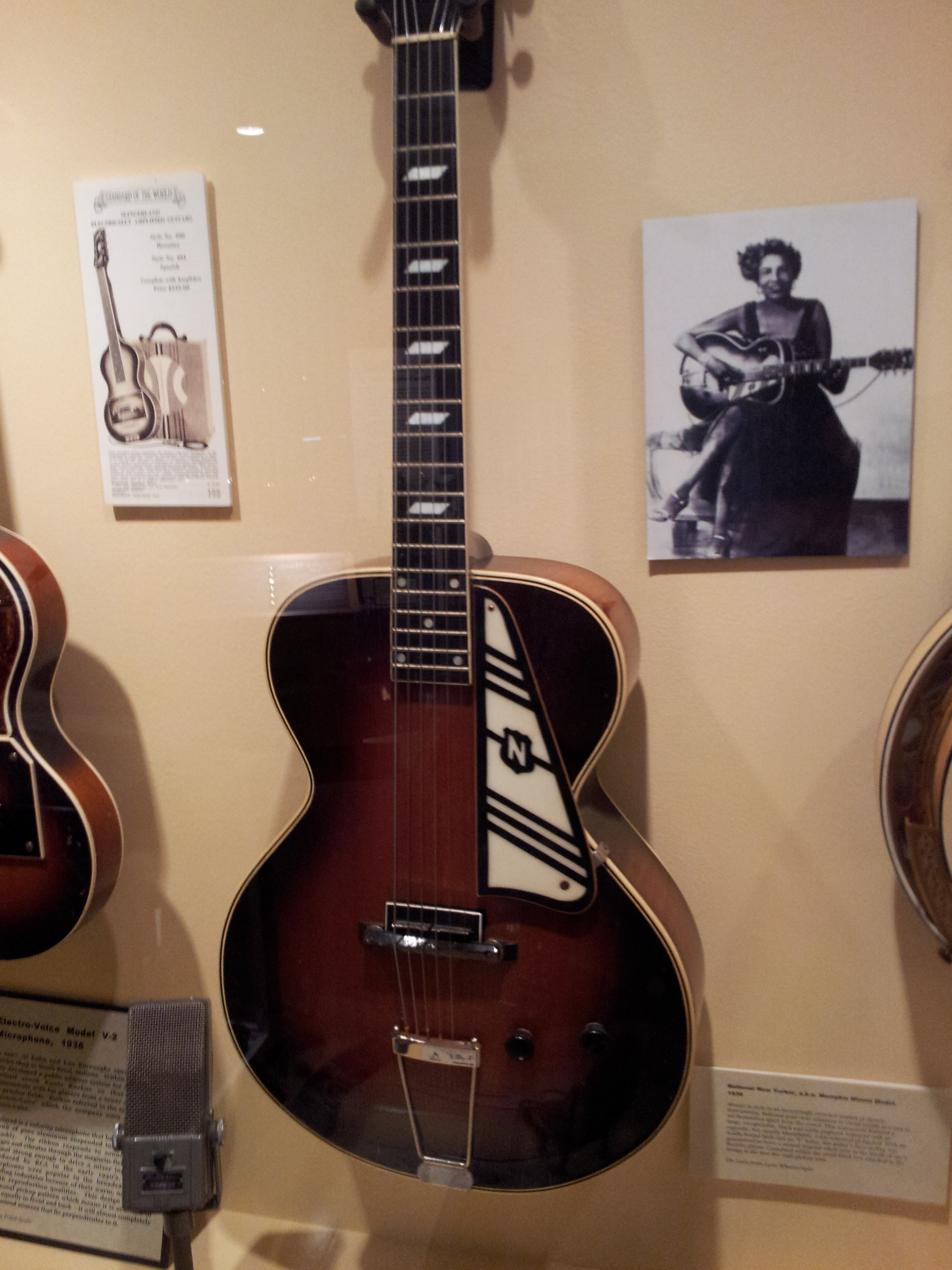
1939 National New Yorker

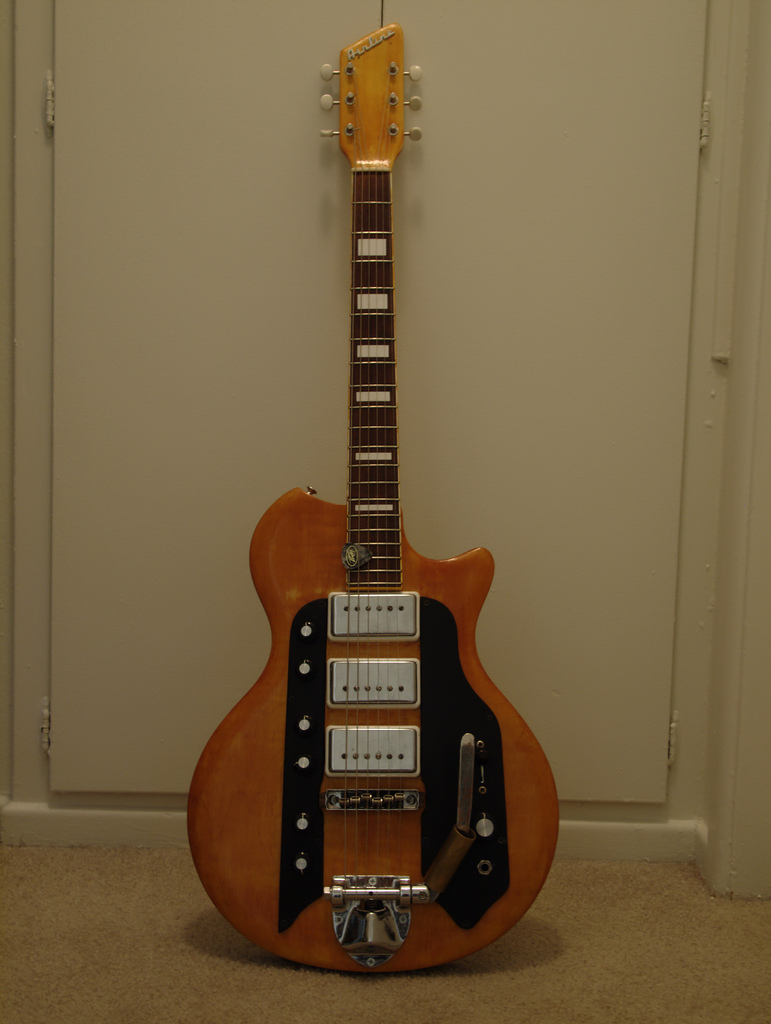
1962 Airline Town and Country

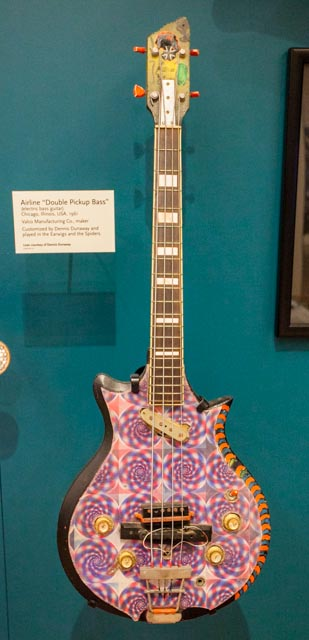
c. 1960 Airline “Double Pickup Bass”

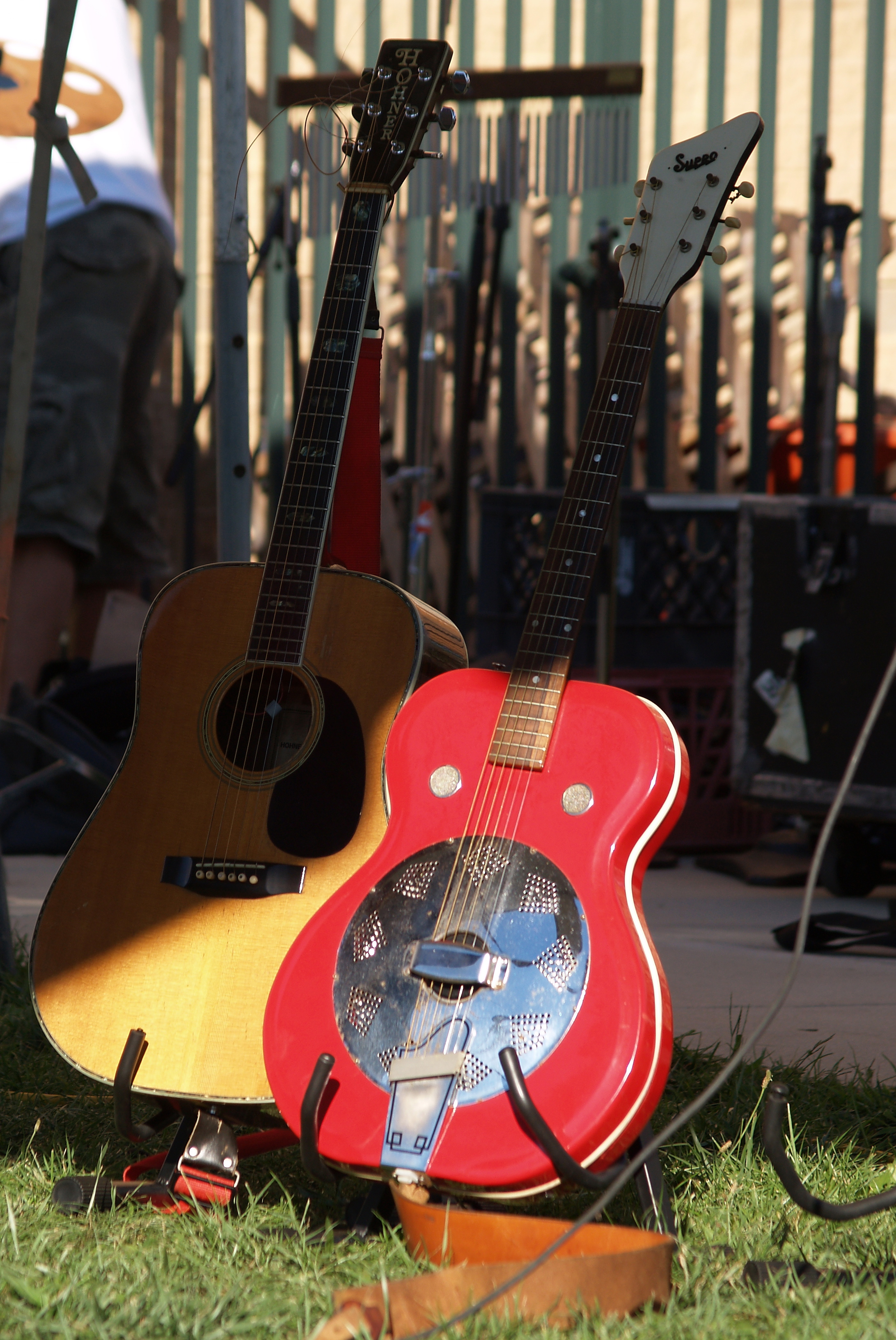
Supro Res-O-Glas resonator guitar

Since Valco's demise a number of manufacturers have issued copies or derivatives of Valco instrument and amplifier models. Eastwood Guitars produces a variety of reissue Airline guitars, as well as at least one Supro model, though all of the former semihollow Res-O-Glas models are now wood solidbodies.

Several of Valco's earlier amplifier models are recreated by Vintage47 Amps of Mesquite, Nevada, using octal preamp tubes, rather than the later miniature noval preamp tubes.

In late 2013, Absara Audio of Port Jefferson Station, New York announced that it had purchased the rights to the Supro trademark from Bruce Zinky. Zinky used the Supro name for a series of amps beginning in 2005 from his company, Zinky Electronics. Absara debuted a series of new Supro amps at the 2014 NAMM Show in Anaheim, California. The new Supro amps are cosmetically reminiscent of their progenitors from the 1960s.

== Bibliography ==
- Wright, Michael (2002). "Supro Guitars and Amplifiers Part I - Supro Part 1". Vintage Guitar Magazine (September 3, 2002).
  Article about Valco's Supro brand
- Wright, Michael (2007). "Supro Resophonic FolkStar". Vintage Guitar Magazine (April 4, 2007).
  Article about Supro's resonator guitars
- ADMIN (2001). "National Westwood and Glennwood - '60s Alt-materials Make Short run". Vintage Guitar Magazine (December 12, 2001).
  Article about National's map guitars
- Ray, Will (2012). "Resurrecting a 1957 Supro Dual Tone". Premier Guitar (March 2012). Archived from the original on 2012-12-05.
- Vintage Guitar Info Guy (1995–2002). "National/Valco Vintage Map-shaped Electric Models". Vintage Guitars Info. Archived from the original on 2010-11-19.
