= Supro =

American musical instrument manufacturer

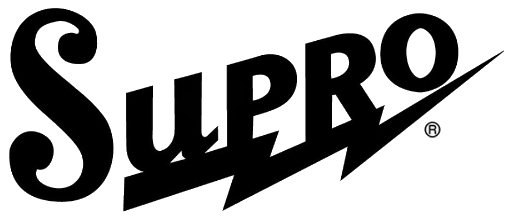
- Product type: Musical instruments
- Current owner: Bond Audio
- Country: United States
- Introduced: 1935
- Discontinued: 1968, revived in 2014
- Previous owners: Valco (1950's–1968)
- Website: suprousa.com

Supro is an American brand founded in 1935, and currently owned by Bond Audio, a manufacturer of effects units. Formerly, Supro produced musical instruments as a subsidiary of Valco. The brand entered into disuse after Valco's closure in 1968, later being revived in 2014.

Range of products currently commercialised under the Supro name includes electric guitars, basses, amplifiers and effects units.

== History ==
Supro was basically the budget brand of companies such as National (then merged with Dobro to form "National Dobro") and later Valco, which would take over these brands. Valco was notorious for manufacturing its guitars with components (especially bodies) provided by other manufacturers.

Supro was also a premium brand of amplifiers, being also the first to produce a combo amp with reverb. Supro amps built from the time of the company's founding to the 1950s were regarded for their sound for rock records.

After 45 years of disuse the brand was revived in 2014, reintroducing a line of vintage inspired guitars and amplifiers.

Rights to the Supro name were acquired by Absara Audio, parent company of effects units manufacturer Pigtronix. The rights to the brand were bought back from its previous owner, Bruce Zinky. Zinky had owned the brand for many years, also designing amplifiers for Fender.

To help its expansion, Absara built a new production facility in Port Jefferson Station, New York, starting with a vintage inspired line of US-made Supro tube amps. Zinky was retained by Absara as design engineer, collaborating with the company on the modern designs of Supro amps.

In 2017, Supro entered into an exclusive distribution agreement with Jam Industries to market the brand in North America. Managed by Joe Delaney, the brand experienced massive growth in sales and notoriety with major product launches such as the Black Magick series, pedals and guitars.

In 2020, Supro was purchased by Bond Audio.

== Gallery ==
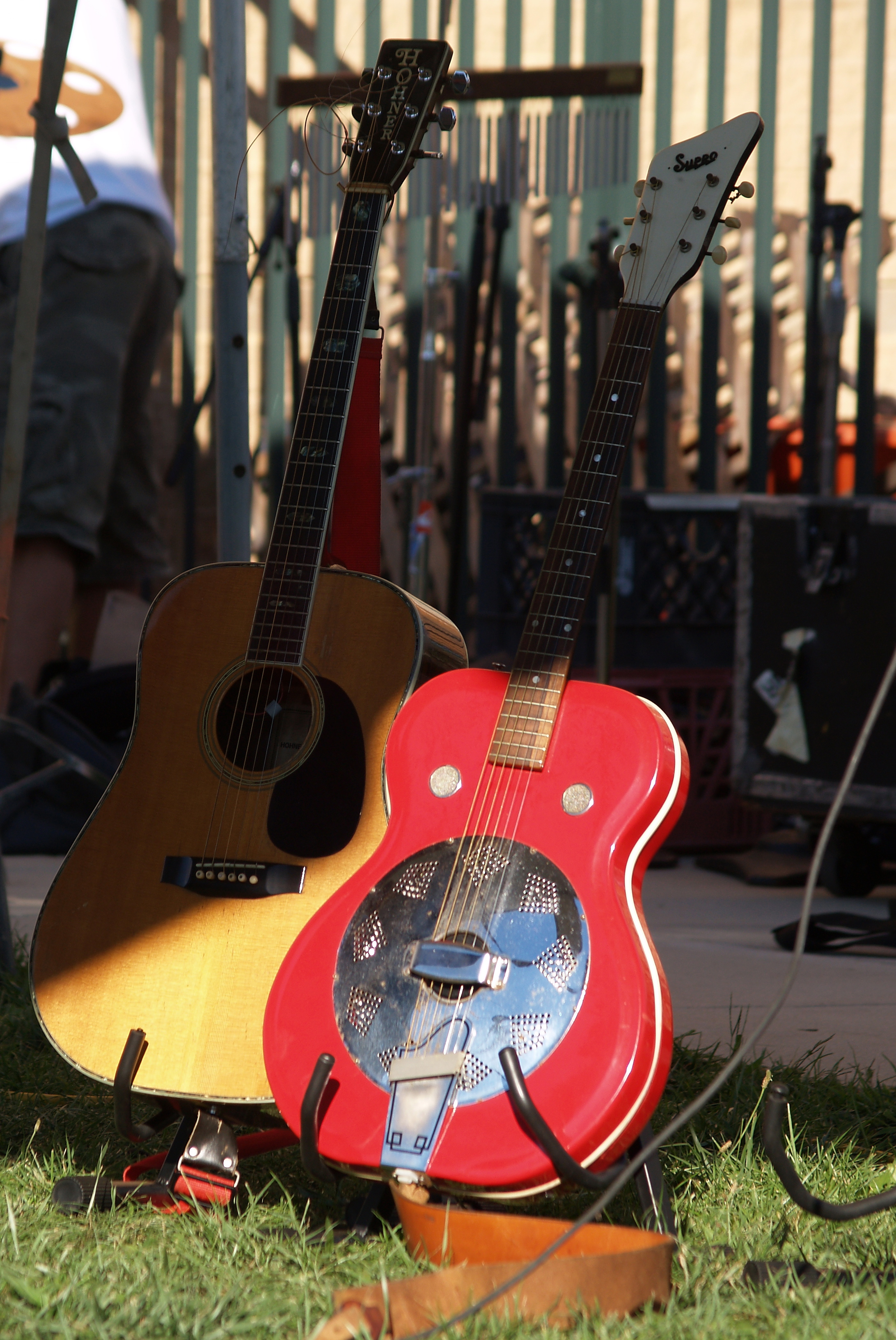
Supro Res-O-Glas resonator guitar (right)

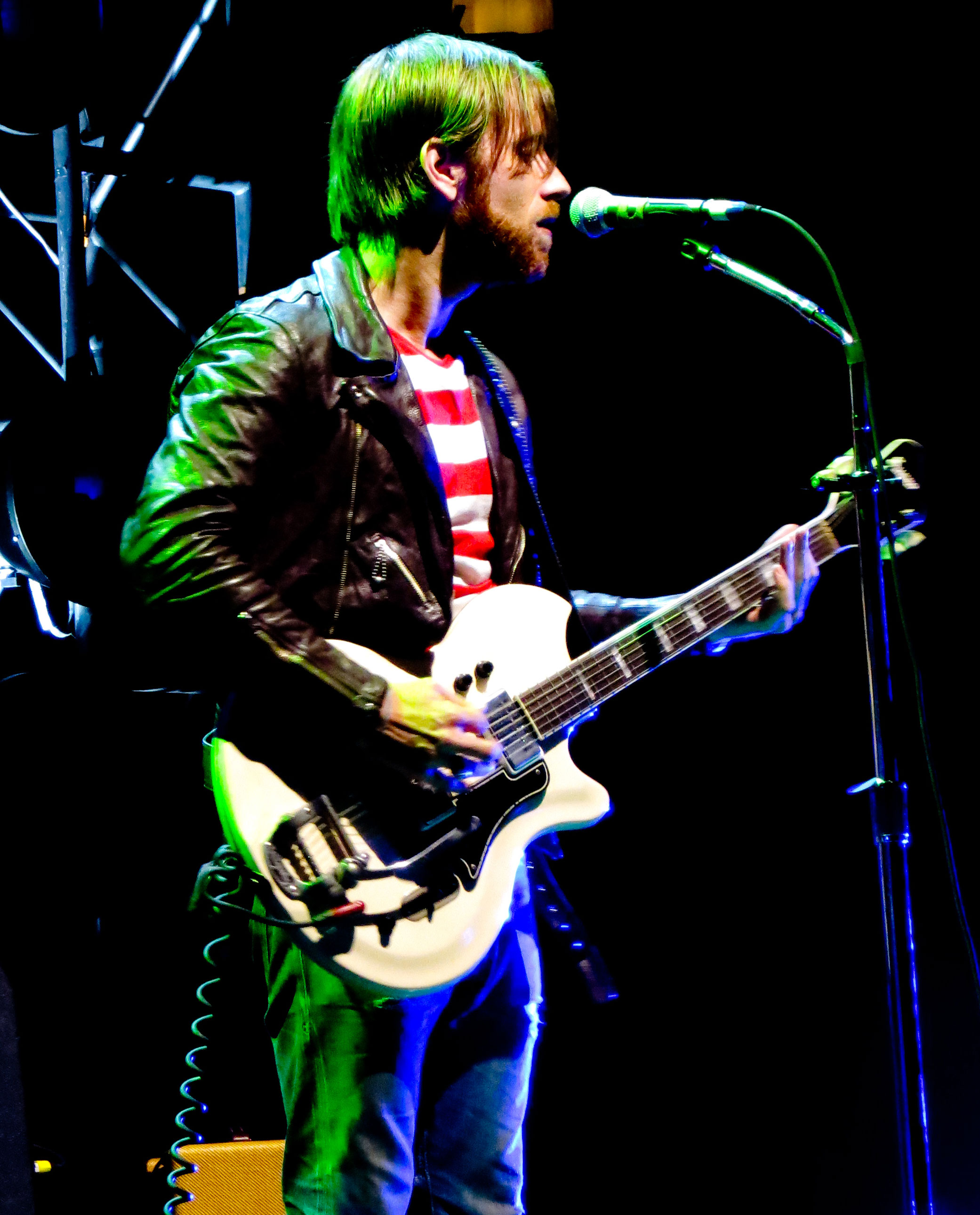
Supro guitar
played by Dan Auerbach

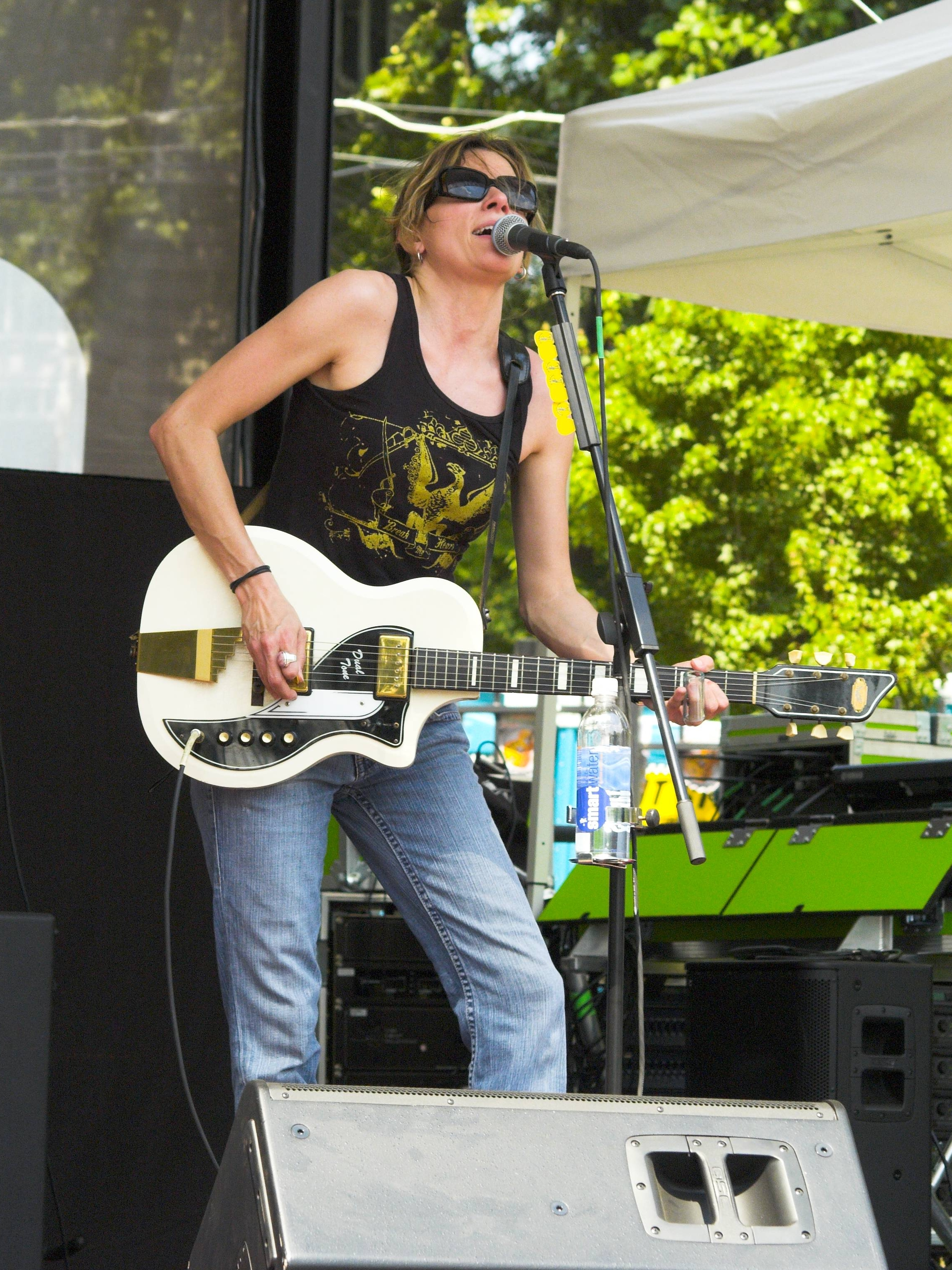
Supro Dual Tone
played by Michelle Malone

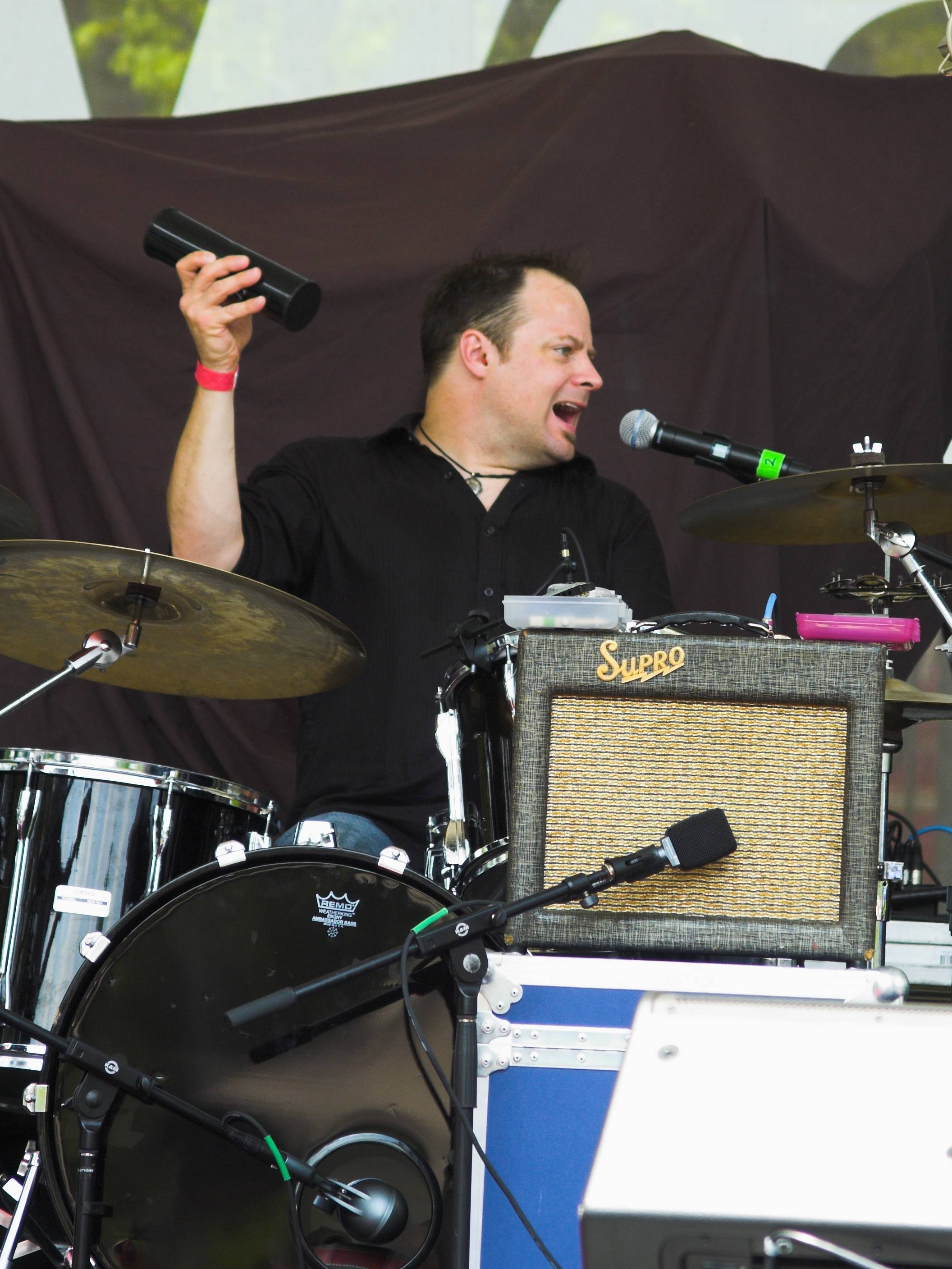
Supro amplifier
used by Michelle Malone
