= Tupelo Hardware =

Tupelo Hardware Co.
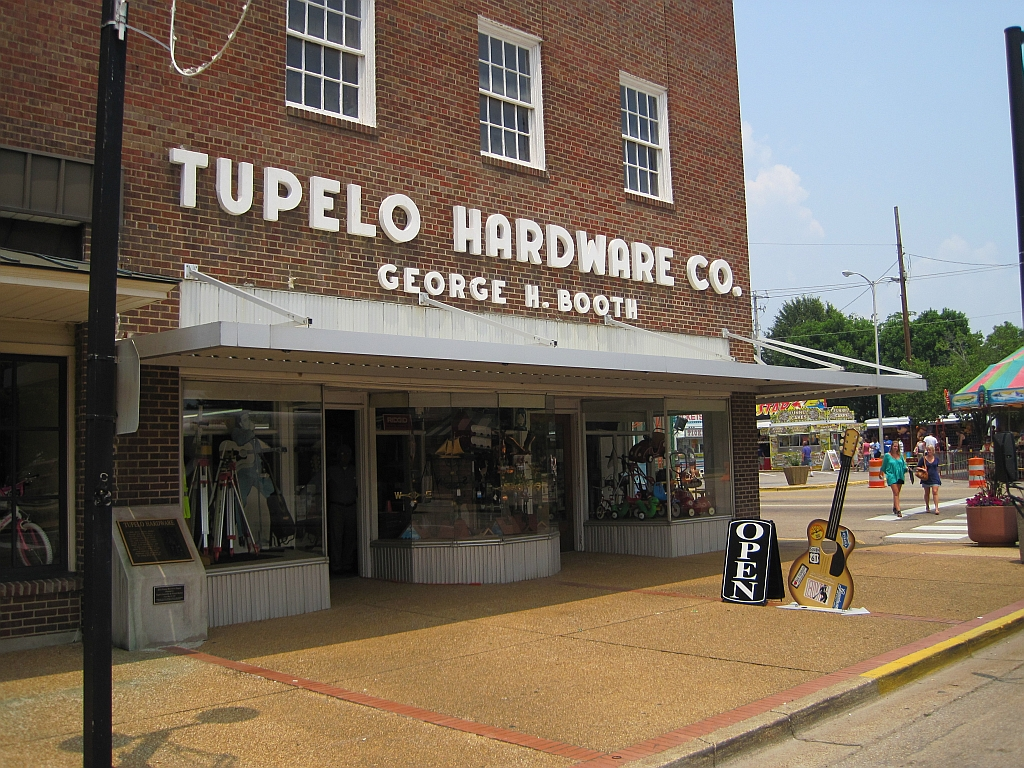
- Main façade of Tupelo Hardware Co.

- Location within Mississippi
- 34.25786°N 88.70355°W
- Location: Tupelo, Mississippi, U.S.

History
- Founded: 1926
- Founder: George H. Booth

Site notes
- Website: tupelohardware.com

Tupelo Hardware Co. is a store in Tupelo, Mississippi, best known for selling Elvis Presley his first guitar.

== History ==
Tupelo Hardware Co. was originally founded by George H. Booth in 1926 in a building across the street from its current location. Throughout most of the company's history, it has served its customers from its three-story brick, Main Street location in the historic downtown district of Tupelo, Mississippi.

=== Elvis Presley ===
Gladys Presley brought her son Elvis to Tupelo Hardware Co. in January 1945 to buy him a birthday present. Elvis would have preferred a rifle, but his mother succeeded in buying a guitar instead. The boy strummed the new guitar for a while, before his mother paid $7.75 and a 2% sales tax.
