= Eastwood Guitars =

Canadian manufacturer of guitars

Eastwood Guitars is a Canadian manufacturer of stringed instruments. It was founded in 2001 by Michael Robinson. The company specializes in making vintage-style instruments, including electric guitars, basses, electric mandolins, resonator guitars, lap steels, tenor guitars, and ukuleles.

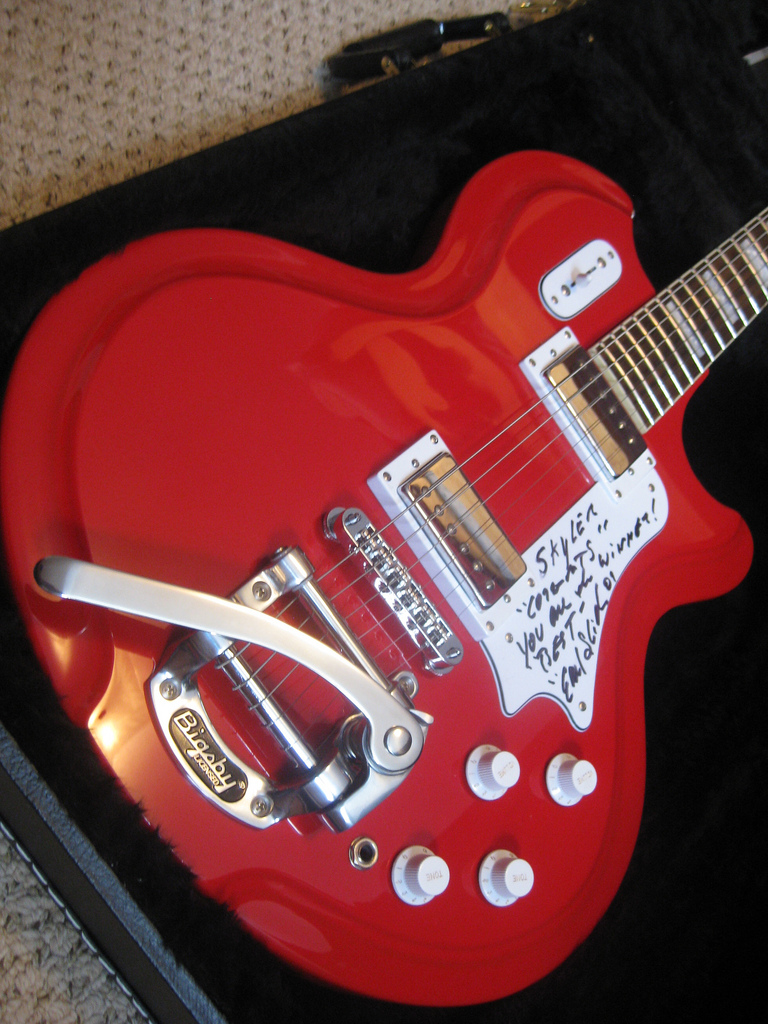
Airline Coronado DLX autographed by Earl Slick

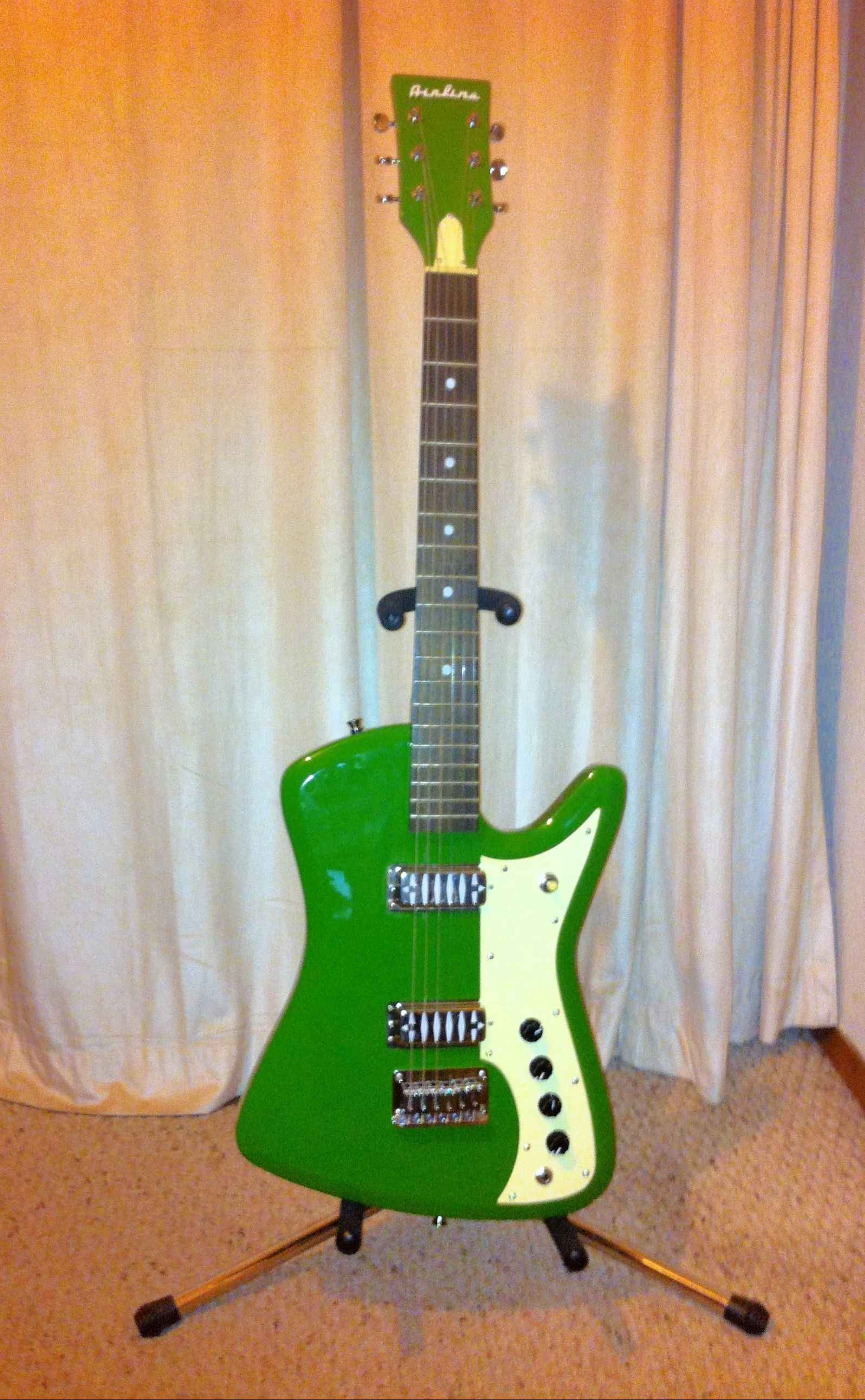
Eastwood Airline Bighorn electric guitar
