= List of the Beatles' instruments =

The Beatles started out like most other rock and roll bands, employing a standard guitars/bass/drums instrumentation. As their touring days wound down, they became a full-time studio band. Their scope of experimentation grew, as did the palette of sounds. This article attempts to list the instruments used to achieve those results.

Not listed are instruments played by the Beatles’ session players such as cello, violin, saxophone, trumpet, French horn or the 41-piece orchestra heard on "A Day in the Life".

== Guitars ==
Both John Lennon and George Harrison used the Gibson J-160E, an acoustic guitar with an electric pickup at the base of the fretboard. The resonant character of the full acoustic body, combined with the electric pickup, meant that this guitar was susceptible to feedback, employed to great effect on the intro to "I Feel Fine". Lennon also used a Framus Hootenanny twelve-string acoustic, which can be seen in the movie Help! and heard on the title song and "You've Got to Hide Your Love Away". This twelve-string guitar accounted for audibly richer rhythm guitar parts on songs like these, in comparison to the six-string Gibsons. After Sgt. Pepper's Lonely Hearts Club Band, Lennon moved on to a Martin D-28 from C. F. Martin & Company (alternating between the J-160E and the D-28 for The Beatles) while Harrison upgraded to a Gibson J-200 Jumbo (which Lennon used on "Two of Us" and other acoustic tracks on Let It Be). Harrison later gave the guitar to Bob Dylan in 1969.

Upgrading from a 1959 Höfner Club 40 guitar, purchased from Hessy's Music Shop in Liverpool, Lennon primarily used a Rickenbacker 325 Capri from 1960 until 1964. He purchased the guitar in Hamburg in its original natural finish and used the guitar extensively throughout the Cavern Club performances. In early 1963 he sent the guitar off to be refinished in its more popular black finish. This is the way the guitar appeared on The Ed Sullivan Show performance in February 1964. Shortly thereafter, he upgraded to a brand new Rickenbacker 325, a much-improved version of his 325 Capri. Rickenbacker specially made a 325/12. During the Christmas shows of 1964, Lennon dropped the new Rickenbacker 325 which made a huge crack in the neck and headstock. British instrument distributor Rose Morris sent a replacement Rickenbacker 325 with a sound hole and in a red fire glo finish. The guitar is called a Rickenbacker 325 1996. Lennon used the guitar for the shows until the other 325 was repaired. In 1968 during the recording of The Beatles, drummer Ringo Starr left the group during tensions and when he returned, Lennon gave the Rickenbacker 325 1996 to Starr. He has had it ever since. During the Help! sessions, Lennon and Harrison acquired matching 1961 Fender Stratocasters.

His second Country Gentleman was given away to a friend (Harrison was an avid sharer of instruments) and is now retained by Ringo Starr. For decades, it was believed that Harrison's first Country Gentleman fell off the Beatles' car in December 1965 and was crushed by a lorry. However, with the rediscovery of McCartney's Höfner 500/1 bass, which has a mismatched tuning key (replaced a few days after the lorry incident when McCartney broke one of his tuning keys), it is now known that Harrison's 1963 Gretsch Tennessean (originally thought to have been stolen in 1969 along with McCartney's 1961 Höfner), or theorized possibly both the Tennessean and first Country Gentleman fell off of the Beatles' car and were crushed.

In 1964 Harrison introduced the electric twelve-string guitar into mainstream pop. His Rickenbacker 360/12 twelve-string was a prototype. Only the second twelve-string guitar Rickenbacker ever made, it was delivered specially to him during their first visit to New York City. Harrison's use of the 12-string inspired Roger McGuinn of the Byrds to start using one too. He also used a Ramirez Classical Guitar which can be heard in "And I Love Her" and seen used throughout the film A Hard Day's Night. Harrison used a Gibson SG around 1966 for promotional purposes; these can be seen in the promotional videos for "Paperback Writer" and "Rain", in addition to film of the recording session for "Hey Bulldog". He eventually gave this guitar to Pete Ham of Badfinger. Around 1968 Harrison also used a 1957 Gibson Les Paul model on a few songs, which was given to him by Eric Clapton and was once in the possession of, among other musicians, John Sebastian of The Lovin' Spoonful. Originally a "gold top" model, the guitar was refinished with a dark red stain before it got to Harrison and was nicknamed "Lucy". The guitar can be seen in the "Revolution" promotional video and the Let It Be film. Also seen in that film is a rosewood Fender Telecaster, given to him by Fender, used on Let It Be and Abbey Road (1969).

Lennon and Harrison both purchased Epiphone Casinos in the spring of 1966. Paul McCartney acquired his Casino in 1964. They were used extensively by John and Paul during the recording of the Revolver album and continued to be used throughout their remaining years along with other instruments by John and Paul. Lennon extensively used his Casino as can be witnessed in the film of their final concert at Candlestick Park in 1966, as well as in the Let it Be film when playing in their studio in London. Lennon's Casino was double-tracked to get sufficient distortion to satisfy Lennon in the intro to Revolution. Although they purchased the guitars with sunburst finishes, both Harrison and Lennon later stripped the finishes off the guitars, claiming it allowed the guitars to "breathe" better. Lennon's stripped-down Casino can be seen in video footage of the famous rooftop concert. Lennon used a Casino almost exclusively from 1966 until the group's break-up and he is even seen with it during the sessions for his Imagine album.

Paul McCartney's electric guitar parts (solos on "Ticket to Ride", "Another Girl", "Taxman", "Drive My Car", "Carry That Weight" and "Good Morning Good Morning" to name a few) were chiefly performed on his own Epiphone Casino or sunburst Fender Esquire. For recordings with acoustic parts played by McCartney ("Yesterday"), he favoured a 1964 Epiphone Texan FT-79. In 1968, he started using a D-28 from C. F. Martin & Company.

== Basses ==
Höfner 500/1

McCartney custom-ordered a left-handed Höfner model 500/1 "violin" bass during one of the group's early residences in Hamburg in 1961. This model, with two pickups very close to the neck and almost touching each other, was replaced by a 1963 model, whose pickups were spaced much farther apart, in a more conventional manner. McCartney continued to use his early model, although very rarely, until the Get Back sessions. It was stolen in 1972, but was later recovered in 2023. He continues to use his 1963 Höfner bass. In October 1965 he switched to a Rickenbacker Model 4001S, during the recording of Rubber Soul (as seen in pictures from those sessions), but certainly by the recording of "Paperback Writer". It would be his principal choice for the remainder of the Beatles' career. He briefly used a left-handed Fender Jazz Bass during sessions for The Beatles double album and again for Abbey Road. He returned to the Höfner during Get Back sessions (Note: He used the 1961 Höfner on the 2 January 1969 session. On 3 January he switched to the '63 Hofner.) and played it during the rooftop concert, but returned to the Rickenbacker for Abbey Road. McCartney continued to use his Rickenbacker in his solo career and with Wings.

== Keyboards ==
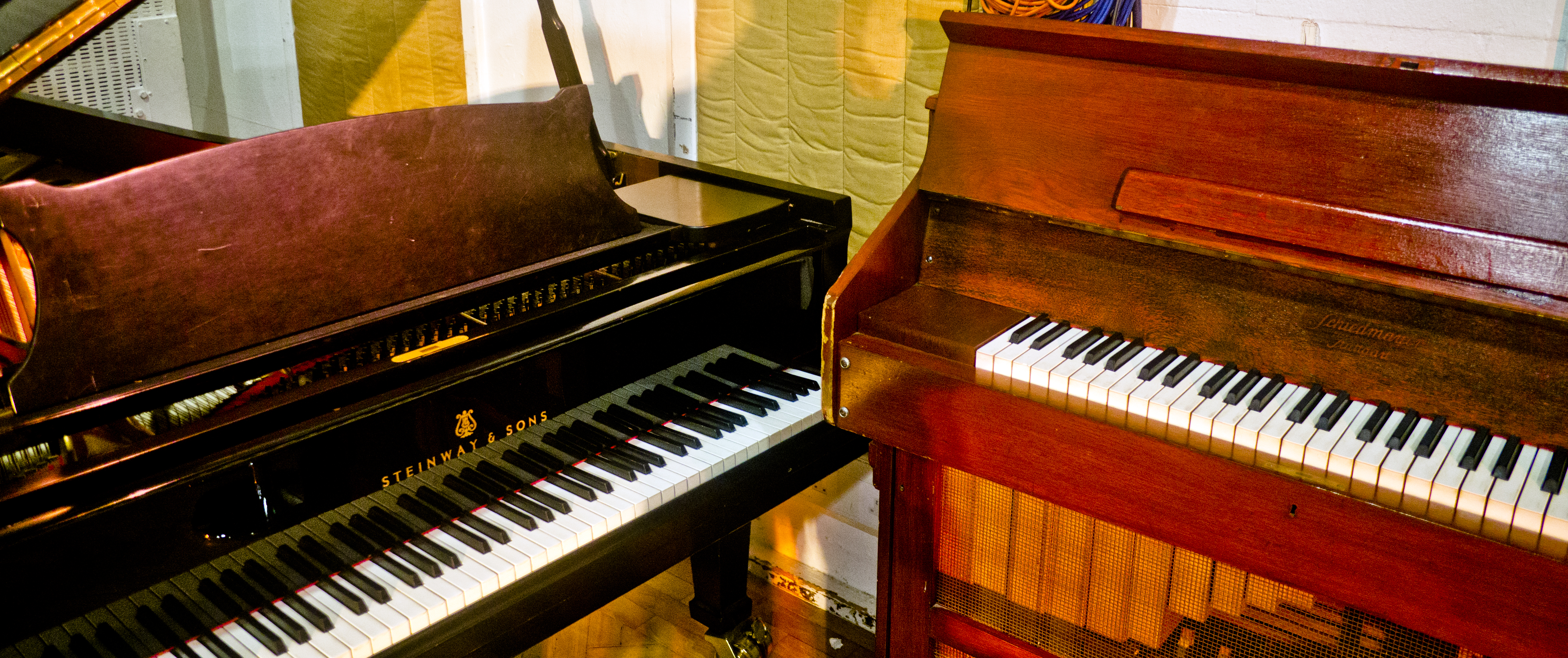
Steinway grand piano (left), Schiedmayer Celeste (right)

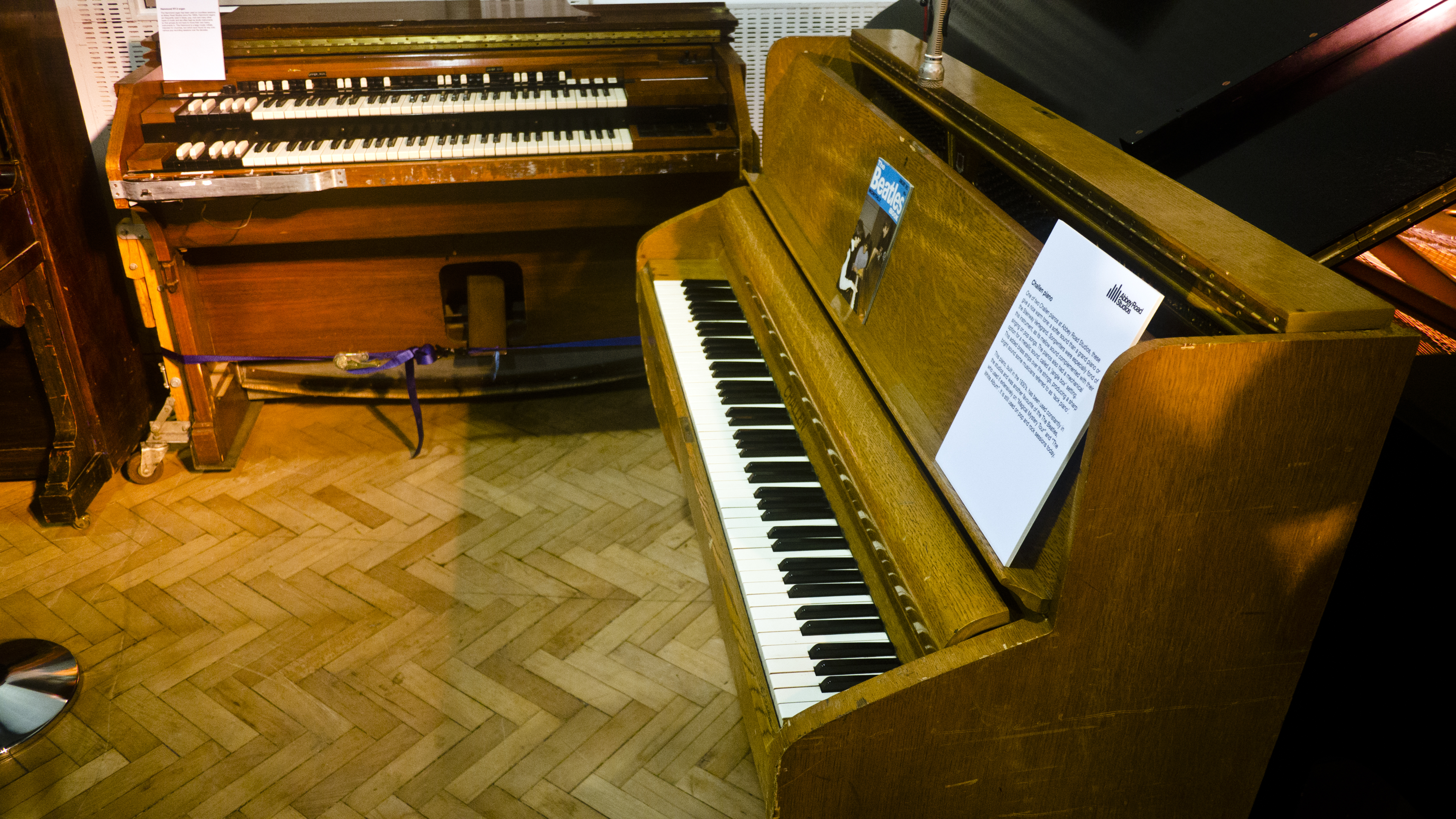
Hammond RT-3 organ (left), Challen piano (right)

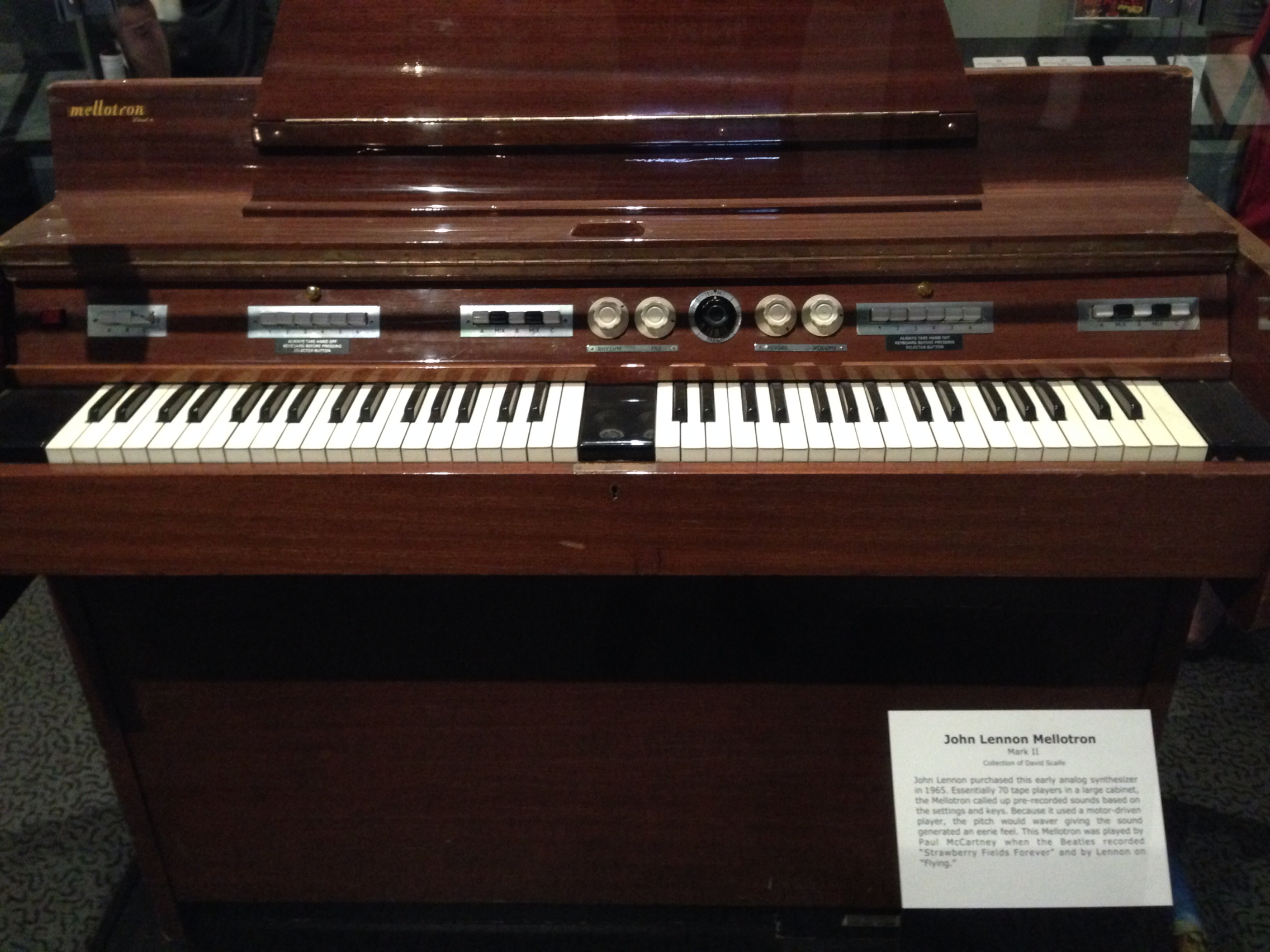
Mellotron MK II purchased by John Lennon in 1965

All four Beatles contributed keyboard parts to their catalogue, supplemented by George Martin, Mal Evans, Chris Thomas, Nicky Hopkins and Billy Preston.

- Hohner Pianet N and CH models
- Steinway Vertegrand upright piano
- Baldwin Combo harpsichord
- Baldwin Satin Ebony Grand
- Bechstein D-280 concert grand piano
- Blüthner Grand Piano
- Challen Piano
- Schiedmayer Celeste
- Mannborg Harmonium
- Moog synthesizer III
- Fender Rhodes Suitcase (‘68)
- Selmer Concert Clavioline
- Hammond RT-3 organ with Leslie Model 122 cabinet
- Hammond C-3 organ
- Hammond L-100
- Lowrey DSO Heritage Deluxe organ
- Mellotron MK II
- Vox Continental organs used on "I'm Down" and others
- Unidentified harpsichord(s?) used on "All You Need Is Love", "Fixing a Hole", "Piggies"
- Unidentified clavichord used on "For No One"

== Microphones ==
Although microphone usage varied somewhat according to the requirements of each song, the group's recordings at Abbey Road most often employed Neumann U47 or U67 microphones for electric guitars and one or more Neumann U47s (unidirectional); U48's "figure eight" (bidirectional) pickup pattern for vocals and most other instruments. The AKG C-12 was used as well, particularly on the bass (speaker) amplifier. Early in their recording career the drums usually were recorded with only two microphones: one overhead (an AKG D19 or STC 4038) and one for the bass drum (such as an AKG D20). Later, more microphones were used on the drums.

The AKG C28 is visible in the Let It Be film. Available studio documentation and interviews with their former recording engineers indicate that this microphone was not used for recording in the studio.

With the group's encouragement, recording engineer Geoff Emerick experimented with microphone placement and equalization. Many of his techniques were unusual for the time but have since become commonplace, such as "close miking" (physically placing the microphone very close to a sound source) of acoustic instruments or deliberately overloading the signal to produce distortion. For example, he obtained the biting string sound that characterises "Eleanor Rigby" by miking the instruments extremely closely—Emerick has related that the string players would instinctively back away from the microphones at the start of each take, and he would go back into the studio and move the microphones closer again. The recording of George Harrison's acoustic guitar in "Here Comes the Sun" was another example of close miking.

== Drums ==
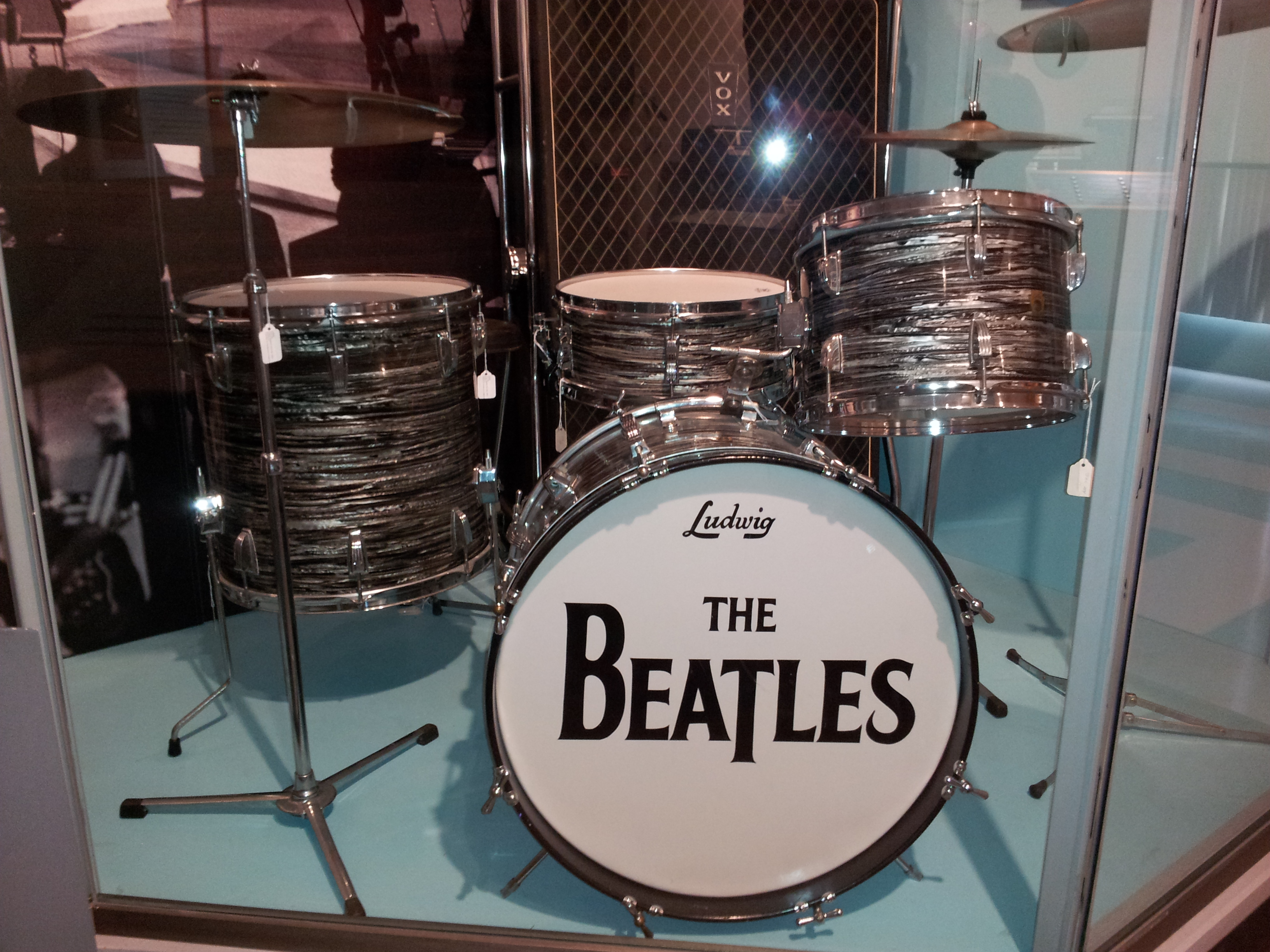
Beatles Ludwig drumset, Vox Super Beatle amplifier, Museum of Making Music

Ringo Starr bought a set of Premier drums in 1960, but in June 1963 made the switch to a four-piece Ludwig set. The American-made drums were newly available in England, but the clincher for Starr was the Black Oyster Pearl finish of the Ludwig kit. He used four similar kits altogether, including two that he kept at Abbey Road. The first two Ludwig kits were 20", 12", 14", plus 14" snare and the second two 22",13",16", 14" snare. Starr played a 20" kit on the Ed Sullivan Show debut in February 1964. He changed to the bigger 22" kit at the end of May 1964. Near the end of the sessions for the White Album, he obtained a natural-tone five-piece Ludwig Hollywood set and set it up alongside his existing Black Oyster Pearl bass drum, according to Mal Evans in the November 1968 edition of The Beatles' Monthly. Starr continued to use the Hollywood kit for the Let It Be and Abbey Road sessions, albeit with a Ludwig Black Oyster Pearl snare rather than the snare with the Hollywood kit, and he used it at the "rooftop concert" as well as his drum solo in "The End". Starr experimented with various muffling techniques. He used Ludwig and Remo drumheads. He started his career playing Paiste cymbals, but switched to Zildjian. He has used Paiste occasionally, most likely due to their easier availability in the UK.

== Instruments specific to Rubber Soul sessions ==
Photographs of these sessions reveal the following gear:

=== Lennon ===
- 1964 Rickenbacker 325 in Black finish (given to Lennon by Rickenbacker at the Deauville Hotel, Miami Beach, Florida, on 14 February 1964)
- 1964 Gibson J-160E sunburst finish acoustic-electric guitar (purchased during the September 1964 US tour. Modified for the Rubber Soul sessions by moving the pick-up to the bridge side of the sound hole)
- 1961 Fender Stratocaster in Sonic Blue finish (purchased by Mal Evans during the making of the Help! album)
- 1965 Framus Hootenanny 5/024 acoustic 12 string guitar

=== McCartney ===
- 1963 Höfner 500/1 Violin Bass (purchased by McCartney in October 1963)
- 1962 Epiphone Casino E230TD in sunburst finish (modified for playing left-handed)
- 1964 Epiphone Texan FT-79 acoustic guitar (also modified for playing left-handed)
- 1965 Rickenbacker 4001S left-handed bass guitar in fireglo (red sunburst) finish, given to McCartney by Rickenbacker at Burt Lancaster's house in Benedict Canyon, Hollywood, during the week beginning 23 August 1965.
- 1965 Tone Bender fuzz-box

=== Harrison ===
- 1957 Gretsch Duo Jet
- 1958 Futurama Resonet Grazioso
- 1962 Gretsch Chet Atkins Country Gentleman and 1963 Gretsch Country Gentleman
- 1962–63 Gretsch Tennessean Chet Atkins electric guitar (purchased the previous year)
- 1962 Gibson J-160E sunburst finish acoustic-electric guitar (purchased on hire purchase from Rushworths, Liverpool in June 1962. Brian Epstein settled the bill a year later (As with Lennon's J-160E, this guitar was modified for the Rubber Soul sessions by moving the pick-up to the bridge side of the sound hole).
- 1965 Rickenbacker 360/12 fireglo (red sunburst) finish electric 12-string guitar (custom built and presented to Harrison on 21 August 1965 at a press conference in Minneapolis, Minnesota, by radio station WDGY in association with local music store B-Sharp Music)
- 1961 Fender Stratocaster in Sonic Blue finish (purchased by Mal Evans at the same time as Lennon's)
- 1968 Fender Telecaster used in 1969 on Let it Be and Abbey Road.
- Sitar (a cheap model purchased by Harrison from India Craft in London in 1965)
- 1964 Ramirez Classical Guitar

=== Starr ===
- Ludwig Super Classic drum kit in Oyster Black Pearl finish with 22-inch kick drum (presented to Starr by Ludwig in New York City on 13 August 1965)

=== Amplifiers ===
- Three 1964 Vox AC-100 amplifiers (prototypes given to the Beatles by Vox at The Futurist Theatre, Scarborough on 9 August 1964)
- 1962 Vox AC-15 Twin amplifier
- Two 1963 Vox AC-30 amplifiers
- Two 1965 Vox AC-100 guitar amplifiers
- 1965 Vox AC-100 bass amplifier
- 1963–4 Fender Bassman amplifier

=== Keyboards ===
- 1965 Vox Continental Portable Organ
- 1964 Hohner Pianet C
- Steinway grand piano
- Challen upright piano
- Hammond RT-3 organ, with Leslie 145 rotating speaker cabinet and Leslie 147 power amp
- Harmonium
- Fender Rhodes piano as seen used by Billy Preston on the Rooftop Concert

== Miscellaneous ==
George Harrison owned many Indian instruments, including tambouras, a swarmandel (or Indian harp) and at least three sitars. All the Beatles kept pianos, guitars and other instruments at their homes to work on songs and demos. Most of these pieces never made their way into the studio with the well-known exception of Harrison's Moog synthesizer. Lennon's home Mellotron was never brought into the studio, though a Mellotron was rented for use during the Sgt. Pepper sessions and an Abbey Road Studios-owned Mellotron was used for the White Album. Both Harrison and Lennon were given Coral electric sitars. Other instruments were recorder, harmonica, banjo, trumpet, saxophone, glockenspiel, vibraphone, accordion, comb and paper, and assorted percussion (congas, bongos, Arabian loose-skin bongo, African drum, timpani, anvil, package case, maracas, tambourine, zill, güiro).

== Pop culture references ==
The "Beatle" style instruments have been used many times in pop culture. In Agent Cody Banks 2 during the fight scene, there is a display of the original instruments and Agent Banks uses Paul McCartney's Höfner bass to hit the villain. The instruments have also been replicated into plastic game controllers for the game The Beatles Rock Band.

== The Beatles as a five-piece, 1960–1961 ==
Period	Lennon	McCartney	Harrison	Sutcliffe/Newby+	Moore/Chapman/Best++
January–June 1960	Höfner Club 40	Zenith Model 17; Elpico amplifier	Futurama Resonet Grazioso	Höfner 333 bass	Moore's drums
June 1960	Höfner Club 40	drums	Futurama Resonet Grazioso; Selmer Truvoice Stadium amplifier	Höfner 333 bass	–
July 1960	Höfner Club 40	Rosetti Solid 7; Elpico amplifier	Futurama Resonet Grazioso; Selmer Truvoice Stadium amplifier	Höfner 333 bass	Chapman's drums
August–October 1960	Höfner Club 40	Rosetti Solid 7; Elpico amplifier	Futurama Resonet Grazioso; Selmer Truvoice Stadium amplifier	Höfner 333 bass; Watkins Westminster amplifier	Best's Premier drums
October–November 1960	1958 Rickenbacker Capri 325; Fender Vibrolux amplifier	Rosetti Solid 7; Höfner Club 40; Elpico amplifier	Futurama Resonet Grazioso; Selmer Truvoice Stadium amplifier	Höfner 333 bass; Gibson Les Paul GA-40 amplifier	Best's Premier drums
December 1960	1958 Rickenbacker Capri 325; Fender Vibrolux amplifier	Rosetti Solid 7; Höfner Club 40; Elpico amplifier	Futurama Resonet Grazioso; Selmer Truvoice Stadium amplifier	bass (Chas Newby)	Best's Premier drums
December 1960 – April 1961	1958 Rickenbacker Capri 325; Fender Vibrolux amplifier	Rosetti Solid 7; Elpico amplifier	Futurama Resonet Grazioso; Selmer Truvoice Stadium amplifier	Höfner 333 bass; Gibson Les Paul GA-40 amplifier	Best's Premier drums
December 1960 – April 1961	1958 Rickenbacker Capri 325; Fender Vibrolux amplifier	piano	Futurama Resonet Grazioso; Selmer Truvoice Stadium amplifier	Höfner 333 bass; Gibson Les Paul GA-40 amplifier	Best's Premier drums

+ Chas Newby (December 1960 only), deputising for Sutcliffe ++ Tommy Moore (January–June 1960), Norman Chapman (July 1960), Pete Best (August 1960)

== The Beatles as a four-piece live and in the studio, 1961–1966 ==
Period	Lennon	McCartney	Harrison	Best/Starr+
July–November 1961	1958 Rickenbacker 325; Fender Vibrolux amplifier	1961 Höfner Violin bass; Selmer Truvoice Stadium amplifier	Futurama Resonet Grazioso; 1957 Gretsch Duo Jet; Gibson Les Paul GA-40 amplifier	Best's Premier drumkit
November 1961 – July 1962	1958 Rickenbacker 325; Fender Vibrolux amplifier	1961 Höfner Violin bass; Selmer Truvoice Stadium amplifier; 'Coffin' speaker rig	1957 Gretsch Duo Jet; Gibson Les Paul GA-40 amplifier	Best's Premier drumkit
July–September 1962	1958 Rickenbacker 325; Vox AC-15 Twin amplifier	1961 Höfner Violin bass; Quad II amplifier; 'Coffin' speaker rig	1957 Gretsch Duo Jet; Vox AC-30 amplifier	Best's Premier drumkit (July–August); Starr's Premier drumkit (August–September)
September 1962 – April 1963	1958 Rickenbacker 325; 1962 Gibson J-160E; Vox AC-15 Twin amplifier	1961 Höfner Violin bass; Quad II amplifier; 'Coffin' speaker rig	1957 Gretsch Duo Jet; 1962 Gibson J-160E; Vox AC-30 amplifier	Starr's Premier drumkit
April 1963	1958 Rickenbacker 325; 1962 Gibson J-160E; Vox AC-15 Twin amplifier	1961 Höfner Violin bass; Vox T-60 amplifier	1957 Gretsch Duo Jet; 1962 Gibson J-160E; Vox AC-30 amplifier	Starr's Premier drumkit
April–June 1963	1958 Rickenbacker 325; 1962 Gibson J-160E; Vox AC-15 Twin amplifier	1961 Höfner Violin bass; Vox T-60 amplifier	1957 Gretsch Duo Jet; 1962 Gibson J-160E; Vox AC-30 amplifier	Starr's first Ludwig drumkit with first drop T logo drumhead
April–June 1963	1958 Rickenbacker 325; 1962 Gibson J-160E; Vox AC-15 Twin amplifier	1961 Höfner Violin bass; Vox T-60 amplifier	1962 Gretsch 6122 Chet Atkins Country Gentleman; 1962 Gibson J-160E; Vox AC-30 amplifier	Starr's first Ludwig drumkit with first drop T logo drumhead
June–September 1963	1958 Rickenbacker 325; 1962 Gibson J-160E; Vox AC-30 amplifier	1961 Höfner Violin bass; Vox AC30 bass head; Vox T-60 cabinet	1962 Gretsch 6122 Chet Atkins Country Gentleman; 1962 Gibson J-160E; Maton Mastersound MS-500 (August only); new Vox AC-30 amplifier	Starr's first Ludwig drumkit with first drop T logo drumhead
October–December 1963	1958 Rickenbacker 325; 1962 Gibson J-160E (stolen in December 1963); Vox AC-30 amplifier	1963 Höfner 500/1 bass; Vox AC30 bass head; Vox T-60 cabinet	1962 Gretsch 6122 Chet Atkins Country Gentleman; Rickenbacker 425; 1962 Gibson J-160E; Vox AC-30 amplifier	Starr's first Ludwig drumkit with first drop T logo drumhead
December 1963 – January 1964	1958 Rickenbacker 325; Vox AC-50 amplifier	1963 Höfner 500/1 bass; Vox AC100 bass amplifier	1962 Gretsch 6122 Chet Atkins Country Gentleman; 1962 Gretsch Tennessean; 1962 Gibson J-160E (used by Lennon and Harrison); Vox AC-50 amplifier	Starr's first Ludwig drumkit with first drop T logo drumhead
February 1964	1958 Rickenbacker 325; 1964 Rickenbacker 325; Vox AC-50 amplifier	1963 Höfner 500/1 bass; Vox AC100 bass amplifier	1962 Gretsch 6122 Chet Atkins Country Gentleman; 1962 Gretsch Tennessean; 1963 Rickenbacker 360/12; 1962 Gibson J-160E (used by Lennon and Harrison); Ramirez classical (studio only); Vox AC-50 amplifier	Starr's second Ludwig drumkit with second drop T logo drumhead
February–April 1964	1964 Rickenbacker 325; Vox AC-50 amplifier	1963 Höfner 500/1 bass; Vox AC100 bass amplifier	Second Gretsch Country Gentleman; Gretsch Tennessean; 1963 Rickenbacker 360/12; 1962 Gibson J-160E; Vox AC-50 amplifier	Starr's second Ludwig drumkit with third drop T logo drumhead
May–July 1964	1964 Rickenbacker 325; 1964 Rickenbacker 325/12; Vox AC-50 amplifier	1963 Höfner 500/1 bass; Vox AC100 bass amplifier	Second Gretsch Country Gentleman; 1962 Gretsch Tennessean; 1963 Rickenbacker 360/12; 1962 Gibson J-160E (used by Lennon and Harrison); Vox AC-50 amplifier	Starr's third Ludwig drumkit with fourth drop T logo drumhead
July 1964	1964 Rickenbacker 325; 1964 Rickenbacker 325/12; new Vox AC-50 amplifier	1963 Höfner 500/1 bass; Vox AC100 bass amplifier	Second Gretsch Country Gentleman (last time George used a Gretsch in the studio was for Beatles for Sale Then he switched to use almost exclusively Fender Stratocasters from Help to Let it Be); 1962 Gretsch Tennessean; 1963 Rickenbacker 360/12; 1962 Gibson J-160E (used by Lennon and Harrison); new Vox AC-50 amplifier	Starr's third Ludwig drumkit with fourth drop T logo drumhead
August–December 1964	1964 Rickenbacker 325; 1964 Rickenbacker 325/12; 1964 Gibson J-160E; Vox AC-100 amplifier	1963 Höfner 500/1 bass; Vox AC100 bass amplifier	Second Grestch Country Gentleman; 1962 Gretsch Tennessean; 1963 Rickenbacker 360/12; 1962 Gibson J-160E; Vox AC-100 amplifier	Starr's third Ludwig drumkit with fourth drop T logo drumhead
December 1964 – January 1965	1964 Rickenbacker Rose, Morris 1996 (replaced 1964 325 after it gets a crack in the headstock); 1964 Rickenbacker 325/12; 1964 Gibson J-160E; Vox AC-100 amplifier	1963 Höfner 500/1 bass; 1962 Epiphone Casino E230TD (studio only); Epiphone Texan FT-79; Vox AC100 bass amplifier	Second Gretsch Country Gentleman; 1962 Gretsch Tennessean; 1963 Rickenbacker 360/12; 1962 Gibson J-160E; Vox AC-100 amplifier	Starr's third Ludwig drumkit with fourth drop T logo drumhead
January–August 1965	1964 Rickenbacker 325; 1961 Fender Stratocaster (studio only); Framus Hootenanny 5/024 12-string (studio only); 1964 Gibson J-160E; Vox AC-100 amplifier	1963 Höfner 500/1 bass; 1962 Epiphone Casino E230TD (studio only); Epiphone Texan FT-79; Vox AC100 bass amplifier	Second Gretsch Country Gentleman; 1962 Gretsch Tennessean; 1961 Fender Stratocaster (studio only); 1963 Rickenbacker 360/12; 1962 Gibson J-160E; Vox AC-100 amplifier	Starr's third Ludwig drumkit with fourth drop T logo drumhead
August – September 1965	1964 Rickenbacker 325; 1964 Gibson J-160E; Vox AC-100 amplifier	1963 Höfner 500/1 bass; Epiphone Texan FT-79; Vox AC100 bass amplifier	Second Gretsch Country Gentleman; Gretsch Tennessean; 1963 Rickenbacker 360/12; Vox AC-100 amplifier	Starr's fourth Ludwig drumkit with fifth drop T logo drumhead
October 1965 – March 1966	1964 Rickenbacker 325; 1961 Fender Stratocaster (studio only) used almost exclusively on every Beatle song by George Harrison from 1965 to 1970 as electric guitar.; 1964 Gibson J-160E; 1965 Epiphone Casino (Used on "Think For Yourself"); Vox AC-30 and AC-100 amplifiers	1963 Höfner 500/1 bass; 1964 Rickenbacker 4001S bass (studio only); Fender Bassman amplifier	Second Gretsch Country Gentleman; 1961 Fender Stratocaster (studio only); Gibson ES-345; 1962 Gibson J-160E; 1965 Rickenbacker 360/12; 1965 Epiphone Casino (Used on "Day Tripper", Think For Yourself and I'm Looking Through You); Vox AC-30 and AC-100 amplifiers	Starr's fourth Ludwig drumkit with fifth drop T logo drumhead
April–June 1966	1965 Epiphone Casino; Gretsch 6120 (live concert only, studio Fender Stratocaster); 1964 Gibson J-160E; 1964 Rickenbacker 325 (Used on "And Your Bird Can Sing"); Vox AC-30 amplifier; Fender Showman amplifier; Vox 7120 prototype amplifier	1964 Rickenbacker 4001S bass (studio only); 1962 Epiphone Casino E230TD (studio only); Fender Bassman amplifier; Vox 4120 prototype amplifier	1961 Fender Stratocaster (used almost exclusively for Electric guitar parts by George Harrison from 1965 to 1970); 1965 Epiphone Casino; 1965 Rickenbacker 360/12; 1964 Gibson SG Standard; 1962 Gibson J-160E; Burns Nu-Sonic bass guitar (studio only); Vox AC-30 amplifier; Fender Showman amplifier; Vox 730 prototype amplifier	Starr's fourth Ludwig drumkit with fifth drop T logo drumhead
June–July 1966	1965 Epiphone Casino; 1964 Gibson J-160E; Vox 7120 prototype amplifier	1963 Höfner 500/1 bass; Vox 4120 prototype amplifier	1965 Epiphone Casino; 1965 Rickenbacker 360/12; 1964 Gibson SG Standard; Vox 730 prototype amplifier	Starr's fourth Ludwig drumkit with fifth drop T logo drumhead
August 1966	1965 Epiphone Casino (used live only by George, John used it both in studio and live); 1964 Gibson J-160E; Vox Super Beatle amplifier	1963 Höfner 500/1 bass; Vox Super Bass Beatle amplifier	1965 Epiphone Casino (live only for George as he used the Fender Stratocaster in studio); 1965 Rickenbacker 360/12; 1964 Gibson SG Standard (used very briefat on a couple of songs); Vox Super Beatle amplifier	Starr's fourth Ludwig drumkit with fifth drop T logo drumhead

+ Ringo Starr replaced Pete Best in August 1962

== See also ==
- List of Gibson players
- John Lennon's musical instruments
- Outline of the Beatles
- The Beatles timeline
- List of most valuable celebrity memorabilia

== Bibliography ==
- Babiuk, Andy (2002). Beatles Gear: All the Fab Four's Instruments, from Stage to Studio. San Francisco, CA: Backbeat Books. ISBN 978-0-87930-731-8.
- Everett, Walter (1999). The Beatles as Musicians: Revolver Through the Anthology. New York, NY: Oxford University Press. ISBN 978-0-19-512941-0. Archived from the original on 4 February 2021.
