= John Lennon's musical instruments =

Instruments played by John Lennon

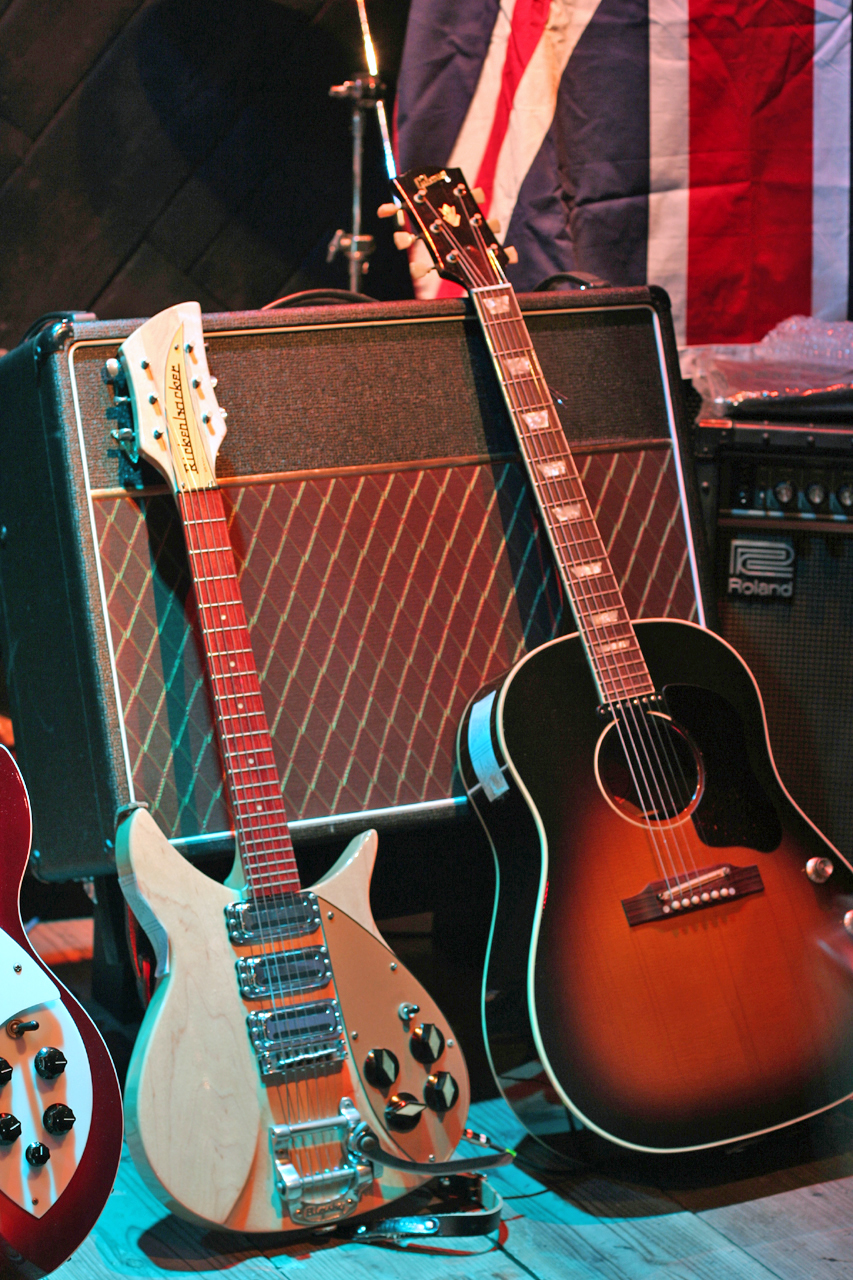
Replica guitars of those played by Lennon

John Lennon's musical instruments were both diverse and many, and his worldwide fame resulted in his personal choices having a strong impact on cultural preferences.

== Overview ==
John Lennon played various guitars with the Beatles and during his solo career, most notably the Rickenbacker 325 (four variants thereof) and Epiphone Casino, along with various Gibson and Fender guitars.

His other instrument of choice was the piano, on which he also composed many songs. For instance, Lennon's jamming on a piano together with Paul McCartney led to creation of "I Want to Hold Your Hand" in 1963.

We wrote a lot of stuff together, one on one, eyeball to eyeball. Like in 'I Want to Hold Your Hand,' I remember when we got the chord that made the song. We were in Jane Asher's house, downstairs in the cellar playing on the piano at the same time. And we had, 'Oh you-u-u/ got that something...' And Paul hits this chord [B minor] and I turn to him and say, 'That's it!' I said, 'Do that again!' In those days, we really used to absolutely write like that—both playing into each other's noses.

Lennon's musicianship went beyond guitar and piano, when he showed his proficiency on the harmonica in early Beatles records. His mother, Julia Lennon first showed him how to play the banjo and encouraged him to learn to play guitar, when they would practice together, "sitting there with endless patience until I managed to work out all the chords". According to Lennon, it was Julia who introduced him to rock 'n' roll and actively encouraged him to pursue his musical ambitions. After Julia's death in 1958 the instrument was never seen again and its whereabouts remain a mystery.

Lennon also played keyboards besides piano (electric piano, Hammond organ, Lowrey organ, harmonium, Mellotron, harpsichord, clavioline), saxophone, harmonica, six-string bass guitar (either he or George Harrison, when McCartney was playing piano or guitar), and some percussion (in the studio).

== Replica guitars ==
Rickenbacker makes several "Lennon" model electric guitars, Gibson makes a limited-edition replica of his J-160E and an "inspired by" John Lennon Les Paul replicating the modified Junior. Epiphone also makes two "Lennon" edition guitars; the EJ-160e and the Inspired by John Lennon Casino.

== Piano ==
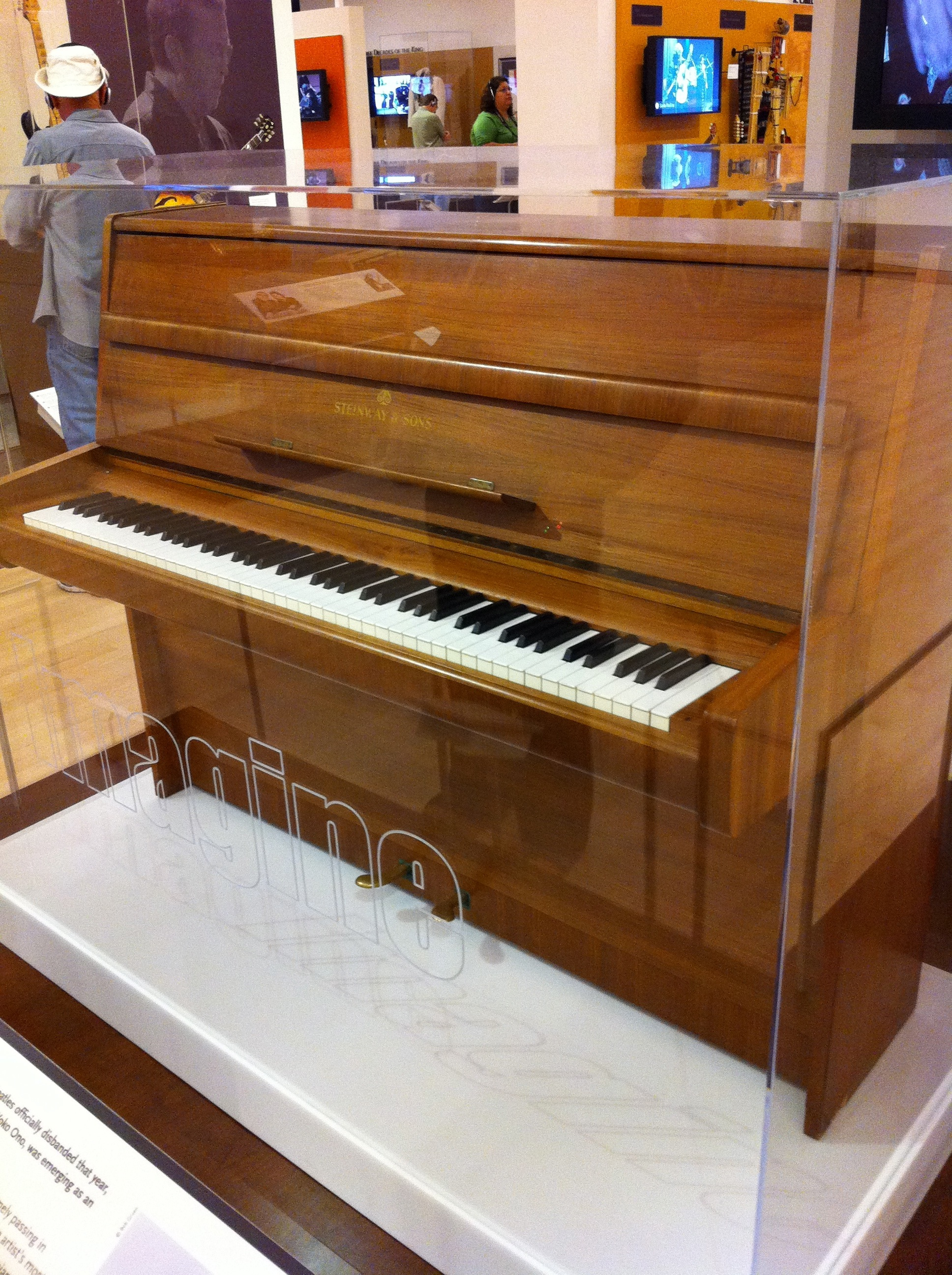
Lennon's Steinway piano on which he composed "Imagine"

Lennon composed his biggest solo hit "Imagine" on a Steinway upright piano. In 2000, this piano was bought by George Michael at an auction for £1.45 million. Later, the piano was on charity tour called the Imagine Piano Peace Project. The piano has been on display at Strawberry Field in Liverpool since 2020.

== Sound effects ==
Lennon used a variety of sound sources for his songs, such as radios, sound effect records, resonators, and even his own heartbeat. He recorded his, Ono's and their baby's heartbeat, for sounds on the Wedding Album and Unfinished Music No. 2: Life with the Lions.

== Instruments ==
=== Guitars ===
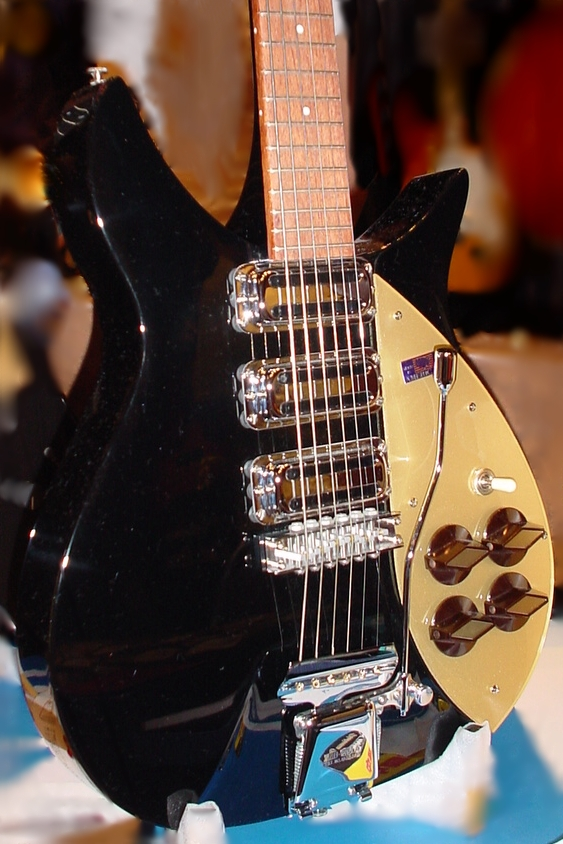
Rickenbacker 325 ('58 model)

Rickenbacker 325 ('64 model)

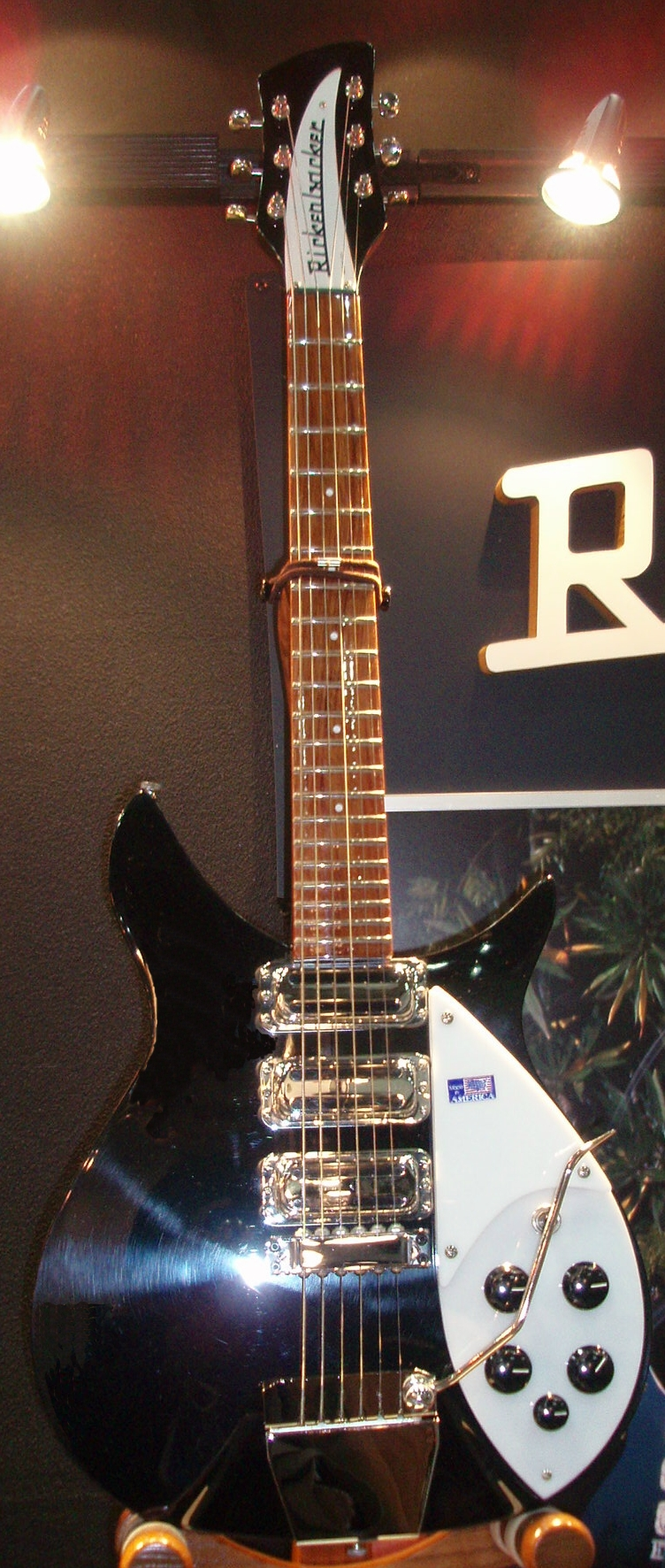
- Rickenbacker 325 (four models):
  - His original 1958 model, serial number V81, modified with Bigsby vibrato and nonstandard control knobs.
  - A 1964 six-string model used on the Beatles' first appearance on The Ed Sullivan Show, serial number DB122.
  - A twelve-string model (similar to DB122), with a trapeze tail piece. Only used a few times in the studio, most notably on "Every Little Thing". Lennon used it at home for songwriting purposes.
  - A Rose Morris model 1996, finished in Rickenbacker's Fireglo finish, and with an f-shaped sound hole. Used after Lennon's second Rickenbacker was damaged. Lennon used it for home studio use until it was given to Ringo Starr during the White Album sessions.

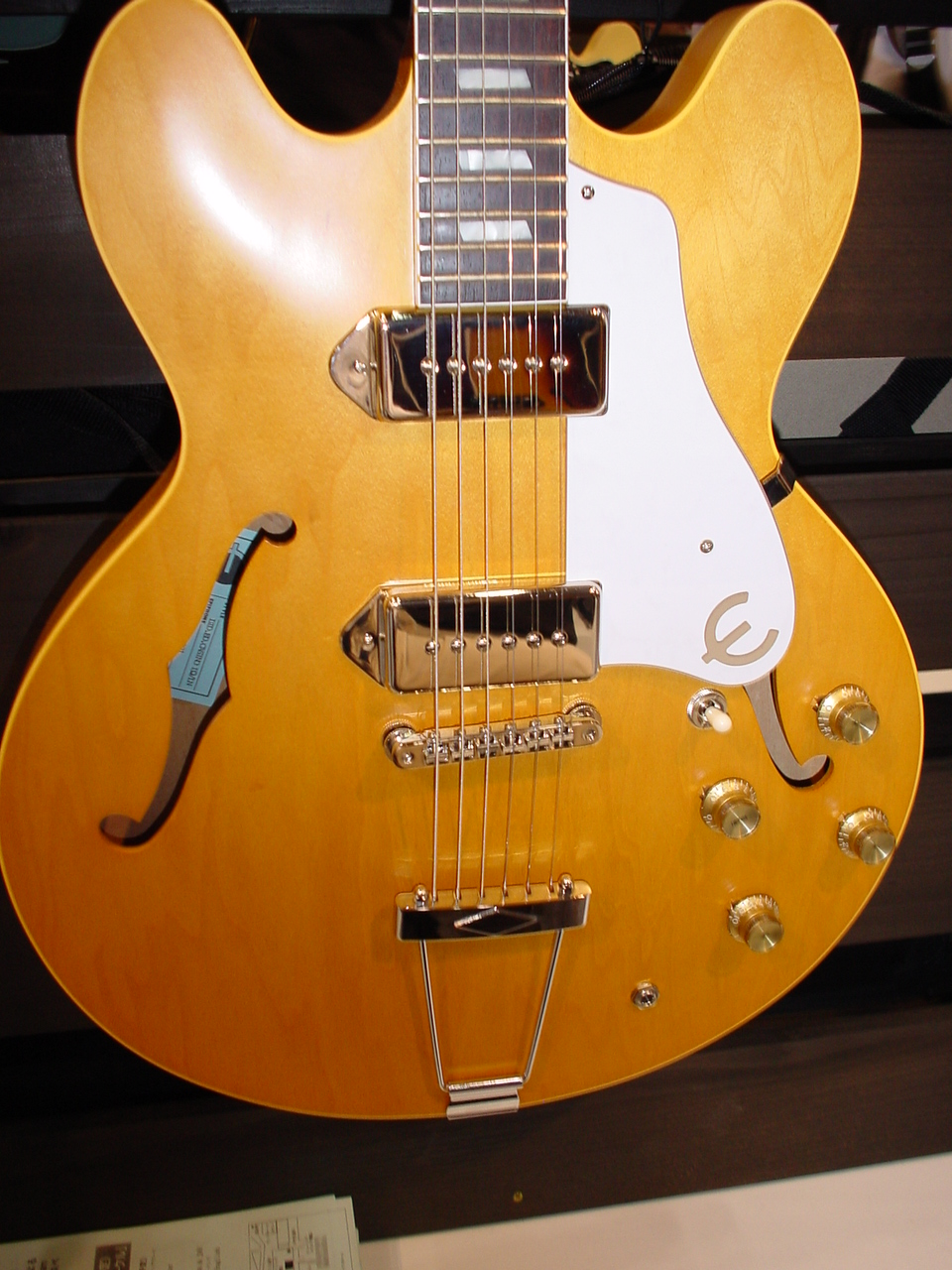
Epiphone Casino (Revolution model)

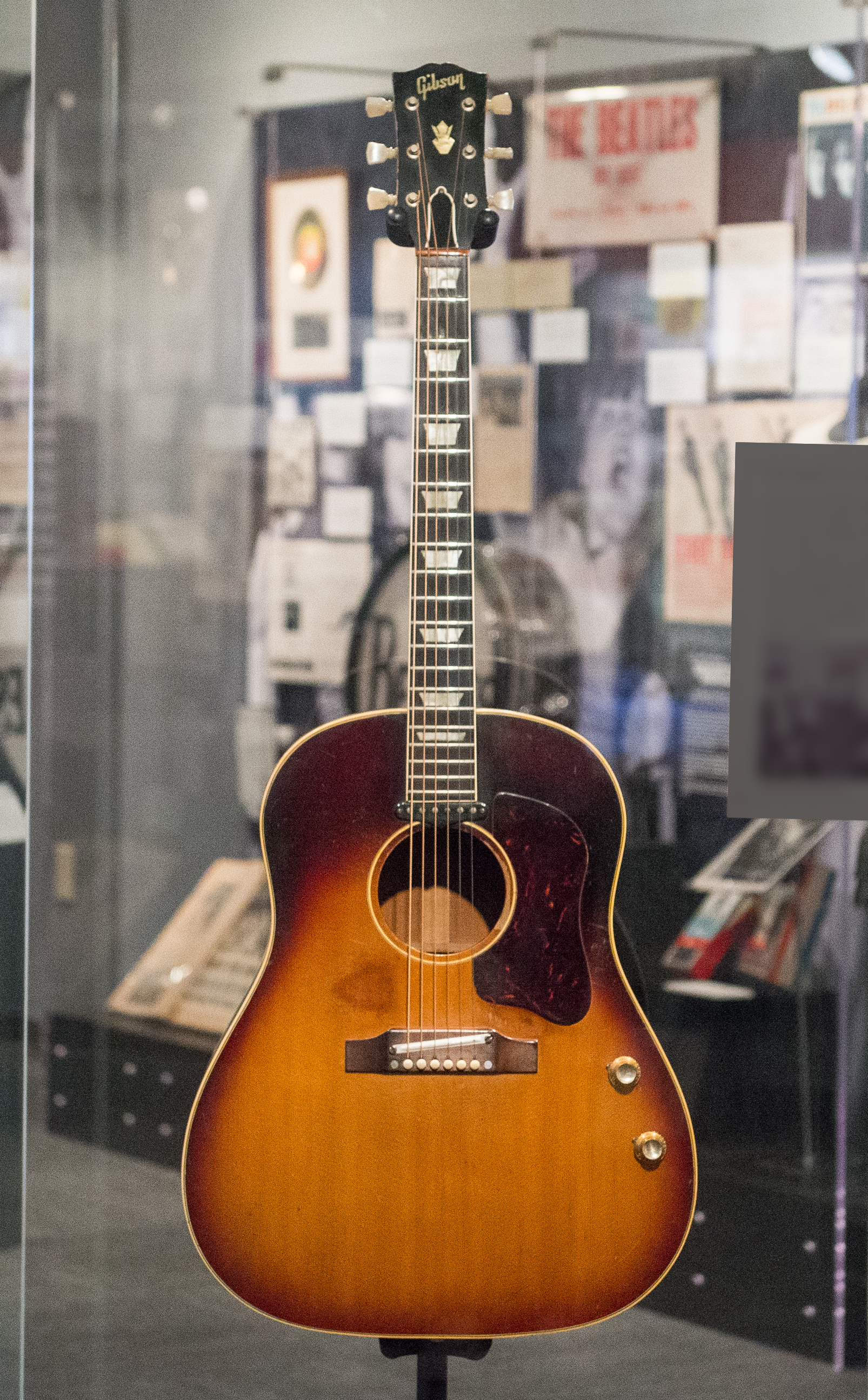
John Lennon's Gibson J-160E

- Epiphone Casino (In 1968 Lennon had his sunburst Casino professionally stripped of its paint, removed the pickguard and changed the tuning machines to gold Grovers)
- A twelve-string Framus Hootenanny acoustic used during the Beatles for Sale, Help! and Rubber Soul sessions and was possibly used on "Polythene Pam".

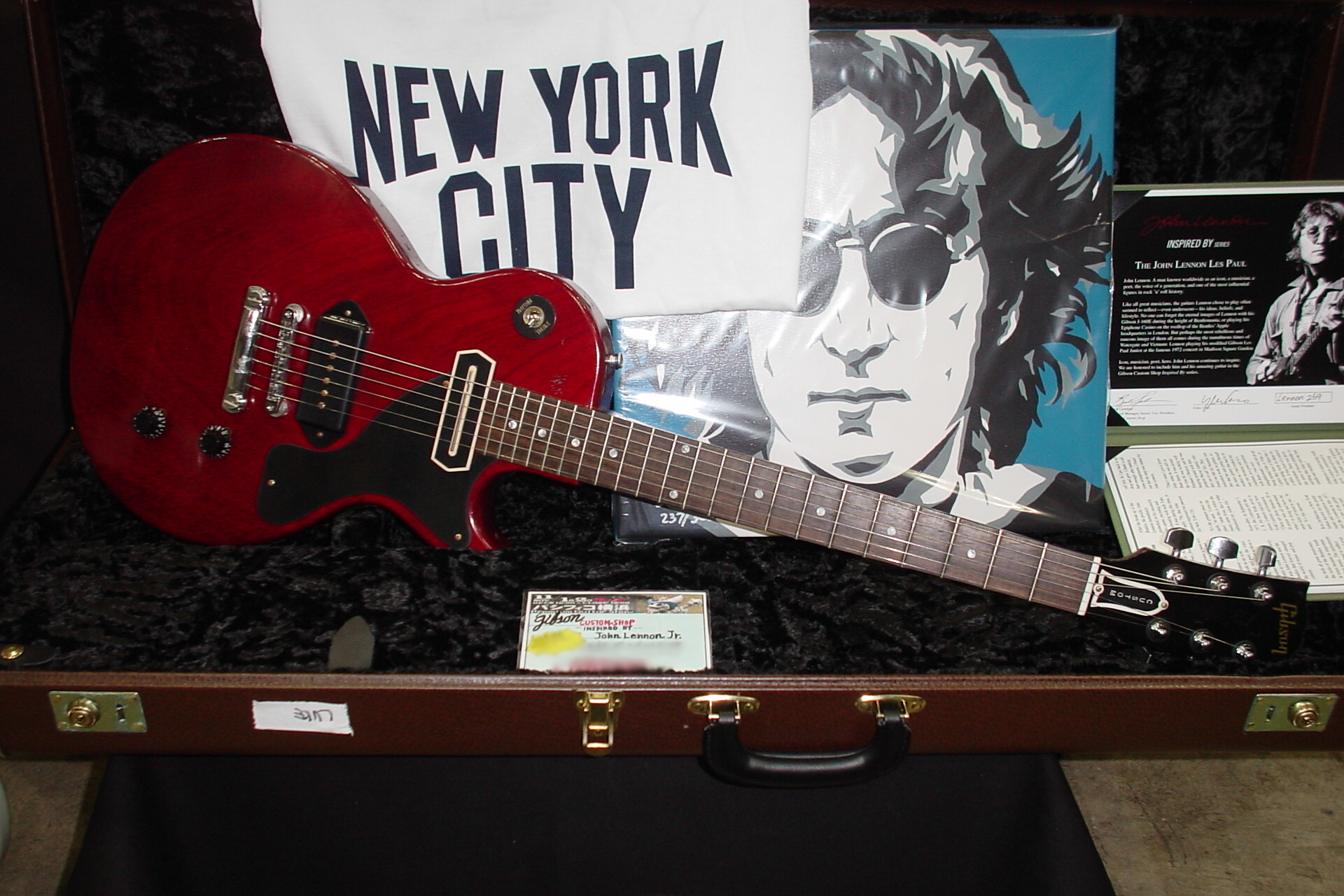
Gibson Les Paul Junior
John Lennon model

- Gibson Les Paul Jr. which was modified with the addition of a Charlie Christian pick-up
- Gibson J-160E Acoustic-electric guitar
- Gibson SJ-200 In "The Beatles: Get Back", Lennon is seen playing this distinctive acoustic-electric guitar (sunburst finish, floral pick guard pattern and "moustache" bridge decor) on different songs.
- 1962 Fender Stratocaster finish in Sonic Blue used from 1965 to 1968.
- Fender The STRAT: candy apple red "Strat" with 22 carat gold electroplated brass hardware bought in 1980.
- 1963 Fender Duo-Sonic #L22604 Bought from Manny's Music and later given to the band Man's lead singer Clive John's by Mal Evans and was used extensively in Man live shows and recordings. Currently resides in the guitar museum of Steve Bellamy.
- Fender Telecaster
- Höfner Senator: according to George Harrison it was bought in 1960 and used for his songwriting purposes. Later given to roadie Mal Evans.
- Guild Starfire XII: Given to him by Guild in August 1966, likely used on a 12-string guitar part on "While My Guitar Gently Weeps". Most likely used for his home studio, somehow it got to Yoko Ono's second husband Anthony Cox. Currently on display at the Hard Rock Cafe in Honolulu, Hawaii.
- Gretsch 6120: (used on the Revolver sessions), used for songwriting purposes at his home studio but has been in Lennon's cousin David Birch's hands since 1967. Currently on display at the Rock 'n' Roll Hall of Fame.
- A 1965 Martin D-28 (bought in early 1967 and taken to India in February 1968)
- An Ovation acoustic.
- A custom Yamaha acoustic given to him by wife Yoko Ono.
- Höfner Club guitar, used after his Gallotone Champion suffered some damage.
- Gibson Les Paul 25/50 (given to Julian in 1978)
- Fender Bass VI: The bass guitar that he and George Harrison would use when Paul McCartney would play piano or guitar. Used by John Lennon on The Beatles and Let It Be, and by George Harrison on The Beatles and Abbey Road.
- Vox Guitorgan, Lennon had received it as a gift from Dick Denny, the inventor of the instrument. Lennon eventually gave the guitar along with his Höfner Senator to road manager and friend Mal Evans. It was later auctioned.
- Sardonyx: a very rare semi-custom guitar built by Jeff Levin with custom electronics by Ken Schaffer. Lennon played the Sardonyx on Double Fantasy and used it in session the day he was killed.
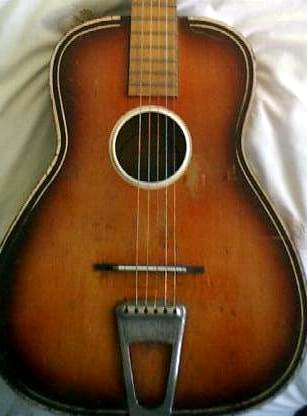
Gallotone Champion

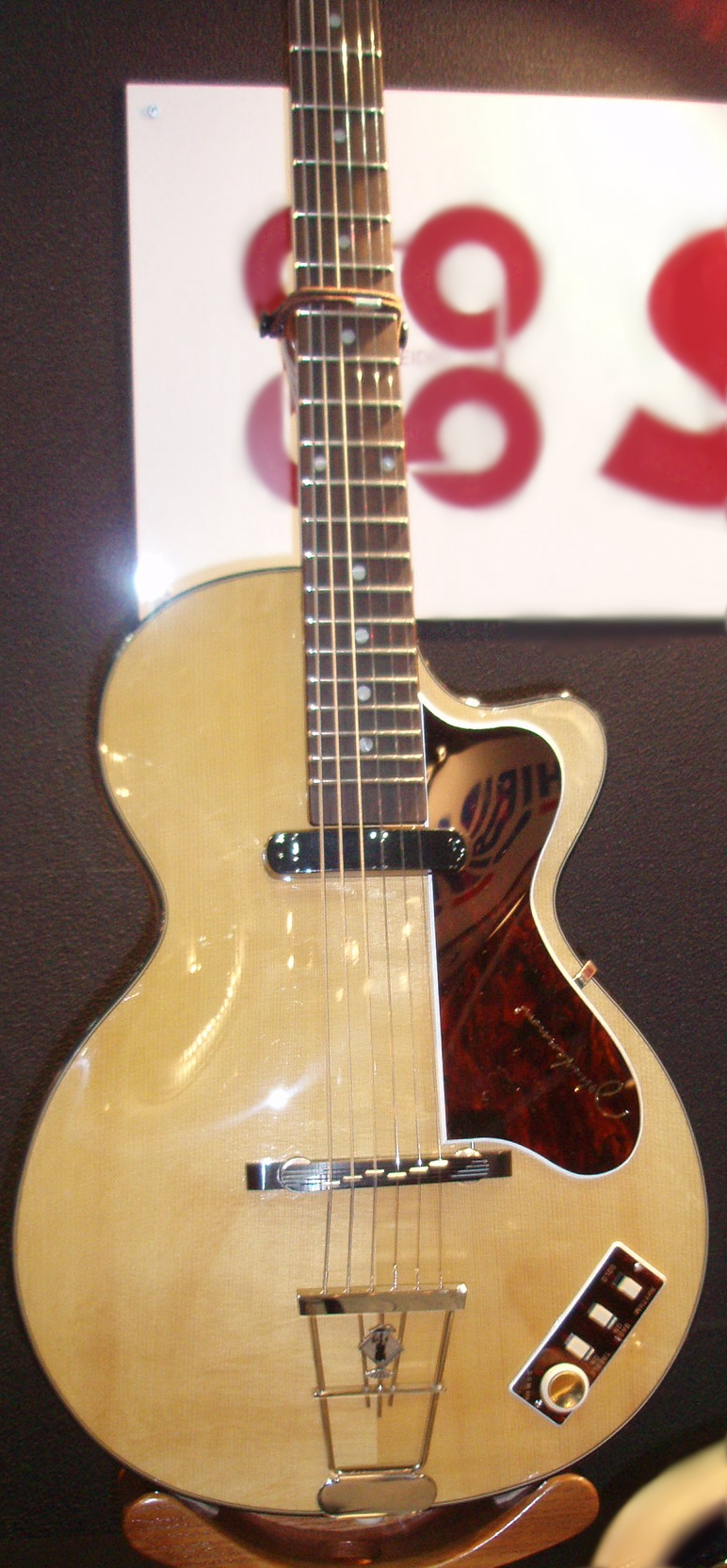
Hofner Club40 John Lennon Edition

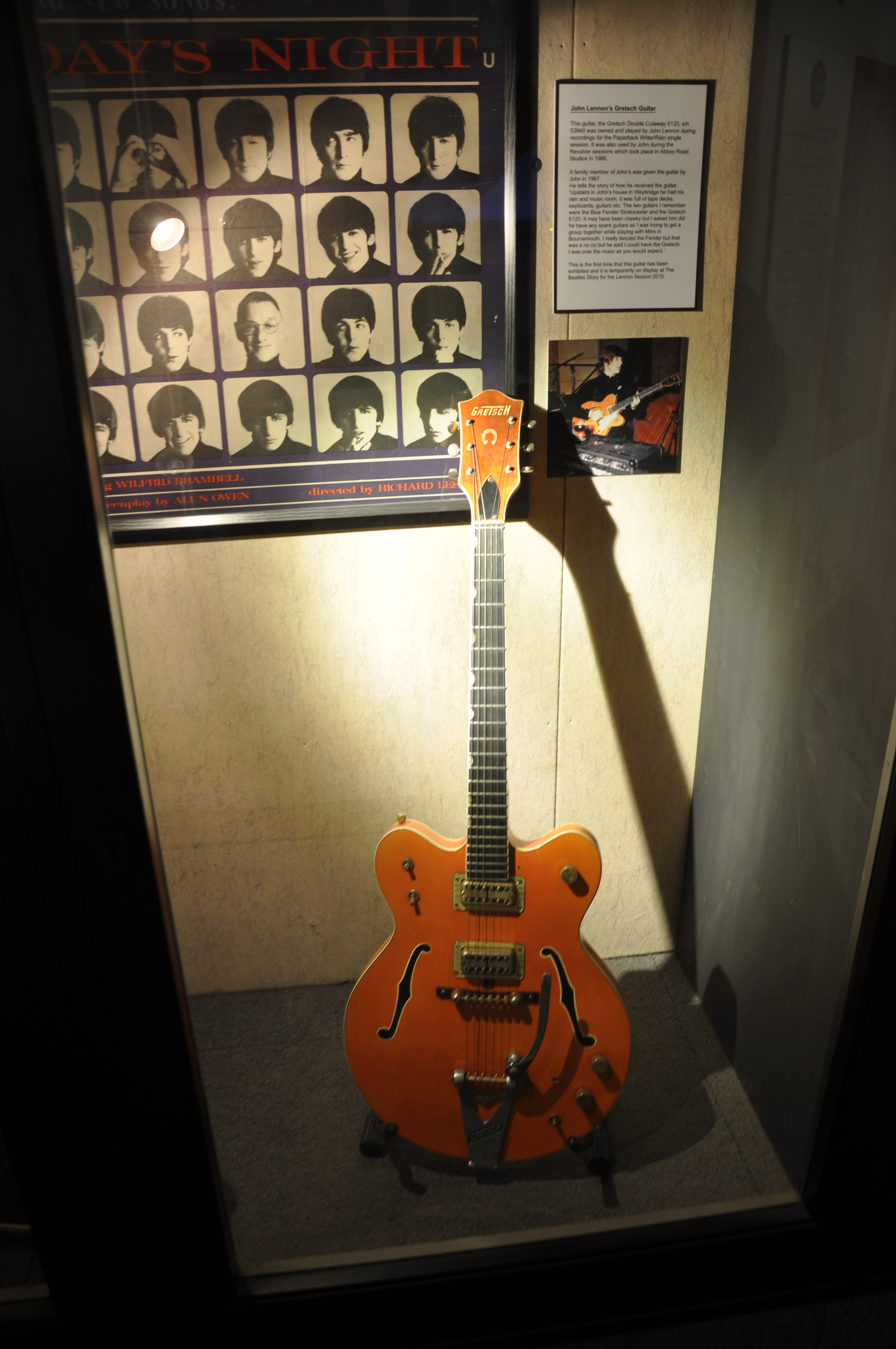
John Lennon's Gretsch 6120 (S/N 53940)

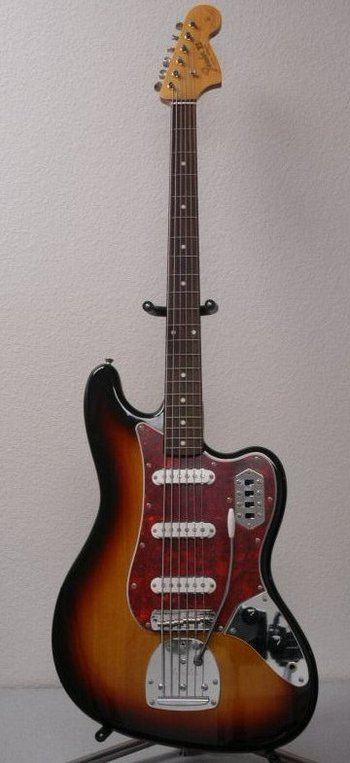
Fender Bass VI

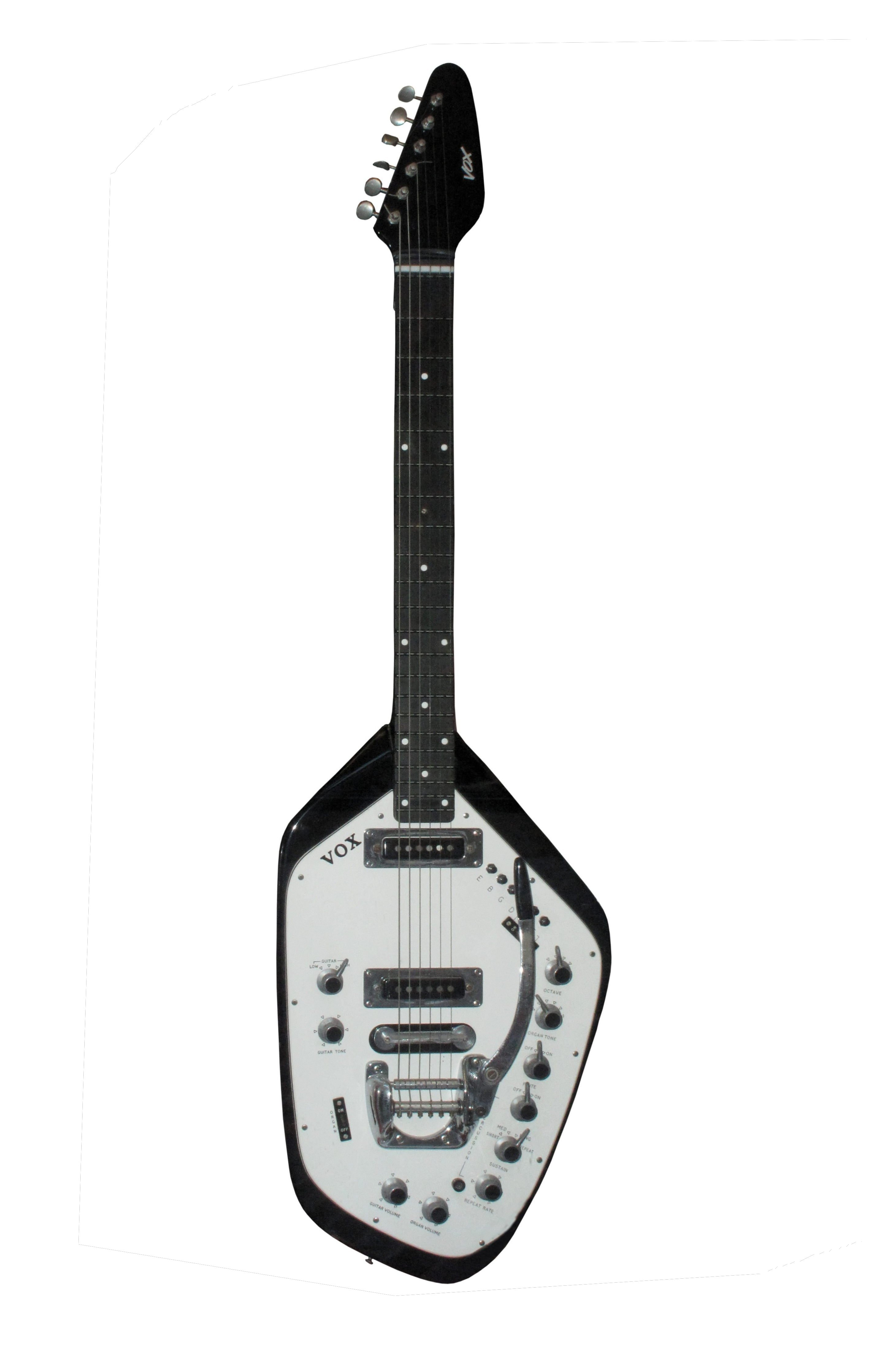
Vox V251 Guitorgan
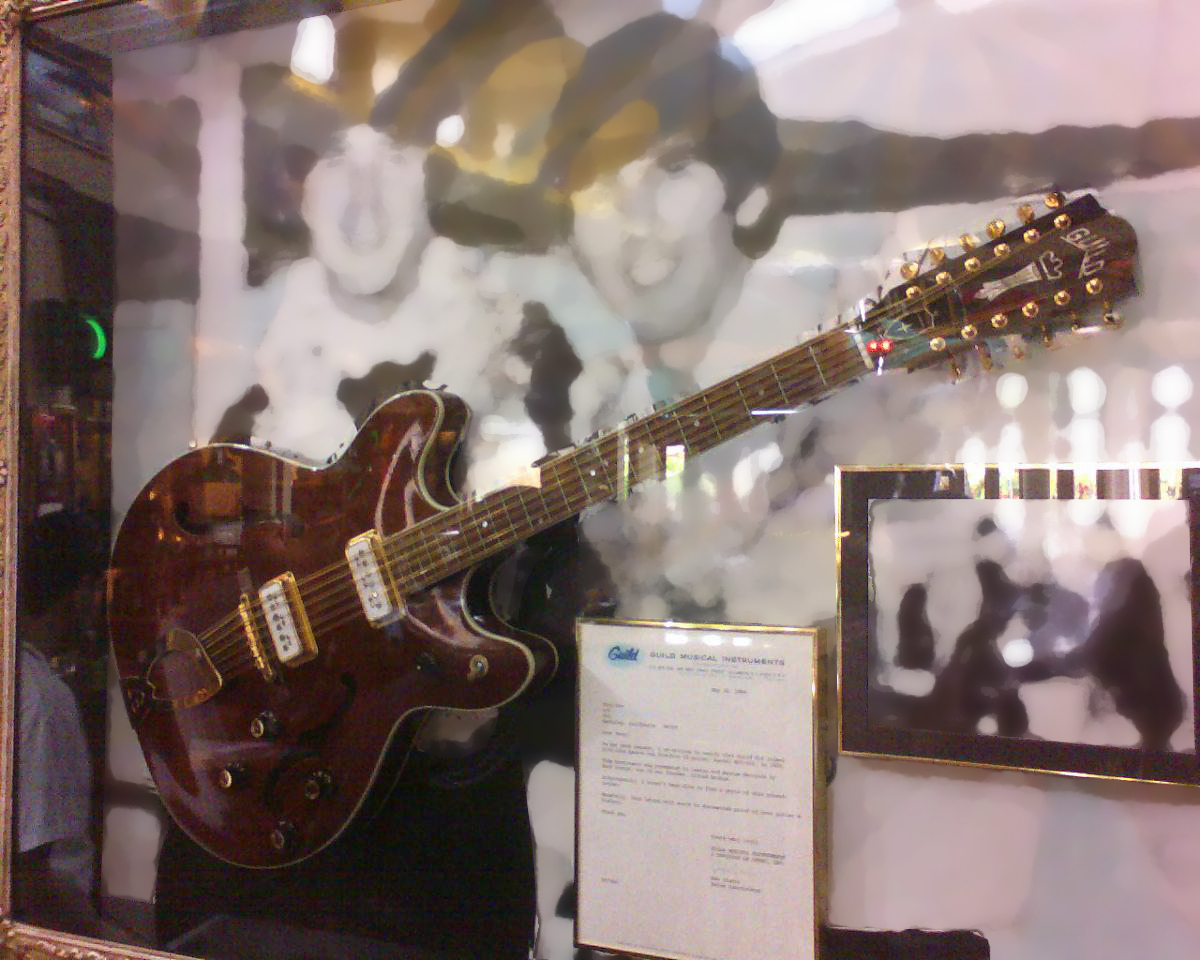
The Beatles' 1966 Guild Starfire XII 12-string

=== Amplifiers ===
- Various Vox amplifiers, such as the AC-30, UL7120 and UL730 and the Super Beatle
- Various Fender amplifiers, such as the Deluxe Reverb and the Twin Reverb
- Marshall amplifiers

=== Pedals ===
- Vox Tone Bender
- Dallas Arbiter Fuzz Face pedal (during the Let It Be Sessions)
- Gibson Maestro Fuzz pedal
- Vox Wah pedal
- Rush PepBox

=== Keyboards ===
- Steinway upright piano model Z
- Bechstein D-280 concert grand piano
- Rhodes, Wurlitzer and Hohner Pianet pianos
- Mellotron (the MK II model was used only at Lennon's home and is now residing at Interscope Records)
- Moog synthesizer used during Abbey Road.
- Sequential Circuits Prophet-5 used during Double Fantasy
- Vox Continental used at Shea Stadium and in the studio. Broke after Shea Stadium. Several other singular and dual manual Continentals were seen in the studio and at John's home from 1966 to 1970.
- Clavinet
- Hammond organ
- Harmonium
- Harpsichord
- Clavioline

=== Harmonicas ===
- Various Hohner diatonic, chromatic, chord and bass harmonicas

=== Percussion ===
- Tambourine
- Maracas
- Cowbell
- Congas

=== Headphones ===
- AKG K240 Sextett

=== Other ===
- Banjo
- Whistling
- Tape loops
- Saxophone

== See also ==
- List of Gibson players
- List of the Beatles' instruments
