= Roger Rossmeisl =

Roger Rossmeisl (1927 – 1979) was a German luthier, best known for designing electric guitars for the American companies Rickenbacker and Fender in the 1950s and 1960s.

== Life and work ==
Roger Rossmeisl was born in 1927 in Kiel, Germany. His father Wenzel Rossmeisl (June 28, 1902– April 3, 1975) was a German jazz guitarist and luthier who had had learned luthiery in Mittenwald, a historic center of violin and guitar manufacturing. In the late 1930s, Wenzel sent his son for traditional luthiery training in Mittenwald.

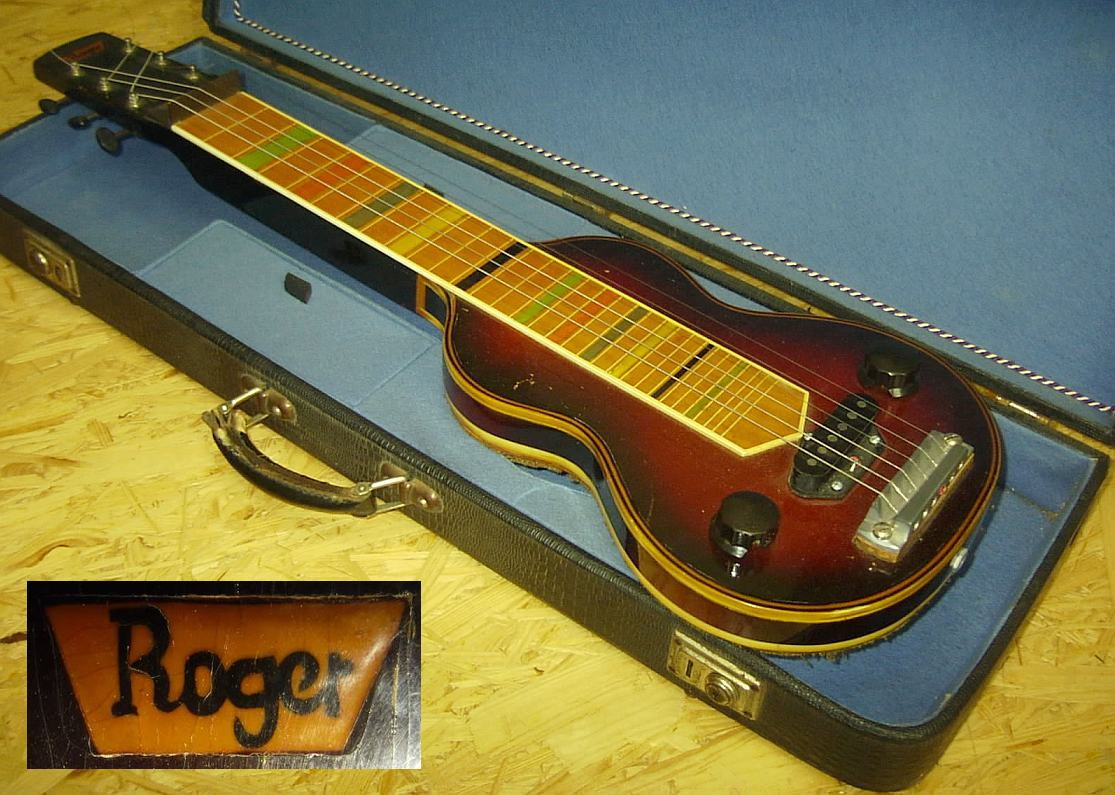
An electrical Roger-Hawaiian guitar (Lap Steel) with suitcase; Roger lettering (small photo)

Wenzel sold his products under the brand name Roger in the late 1930s, as one of very few guitar manufacturers in Germany until 1962. He also distributed guitars by the Italian manufacturer Eko. In 1947, Roger and Wenzel made a lap steel that was the first electric guitar in Germany. Based in Berlin the Rossmeisl's were pioneers in Germany in the design and manufacture of electric pickups. In 1946–7, Roger rebuilt pickups for the jazz guitarist Coco Schumann. They repurposed electrical components such as coils and magnets from Wehrmacht surplus electronics.

In September 1953, Roger completed his business in West Berlin and emigrated to the United States. After a short time at Gibson in Kalamazoo, Michigan, he moved to California to work for Rickenbacker. At Rickenbacker he was instrumental in the development of product ranges including the 300 series of electric guitars and the 4000 and 4001 bass guitars. Semie Moseley, later the founder of Mosrite, was an apprentice at Rickenbacker under Rossmeisl.

In 1962, Rossmeisl moved to Fender, where he was responsible for the development of archtop and semi-acoustic guitars such as the Fender Coronado. While at Fender Rossmeisl hired the young Philip Kubicki from a production line role to serve as his assistant in the company's research and development department.

Characteristic of his designs for Rickenbacker and Fender is the distinctive form of the guitar top; while traditional archtops have a uniform curvature similar to violins and cellos, Rossmeisl's designs have a strong bead on the slab edge and an almost flat surface in the center. This design feature is known as a "German carve".

Save for the Telecaster Thinline, most Rossmeisl-designed Fender guitars proved to be commercial failures that were phased out by the turn of the decade. Although Rossmeisl was assiduous in cultivating personal relationships with guitarists including Wes Montgomery and Joe Pass, his archtop Fender Montego I/II and LTD lines (designed to compete with Gibson's upscale, jazz-oriented Citation and Super 400) did not garner any prominent endorsers as jazz fusion emerged and could not compete with the more accessible price points of such Gibson hollow-body mainstays as the ES-175.

Rossmeisl gave up guitar design upon returning to Germany in 1973. He died in Berlin in 1979 at the age of 52.

== Instruments designed by Roger Rossmeisl ==
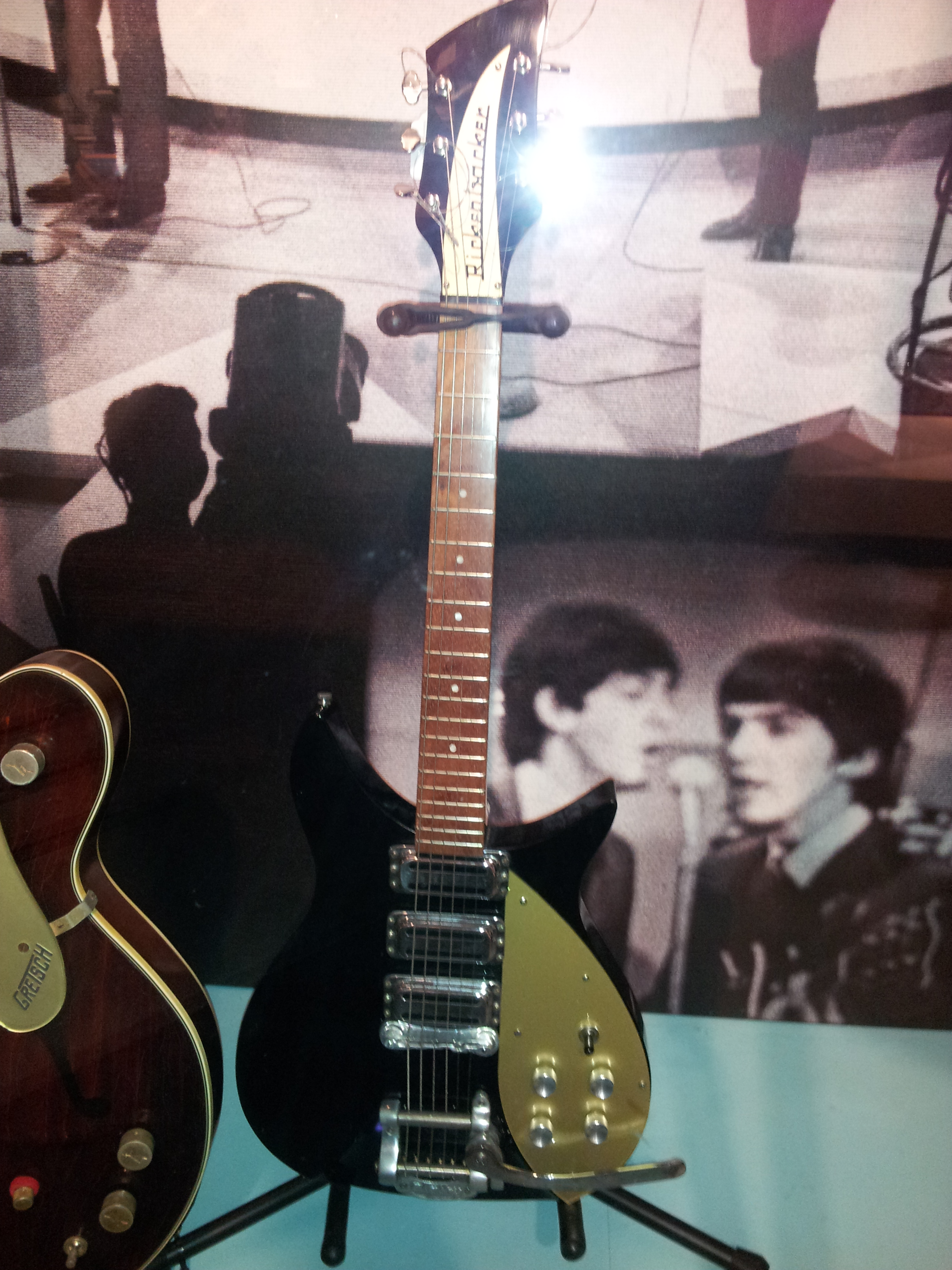
Rickenbacker 325

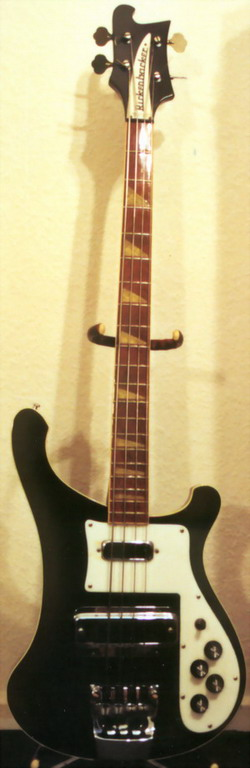
Rickenbacker 4001 Bass

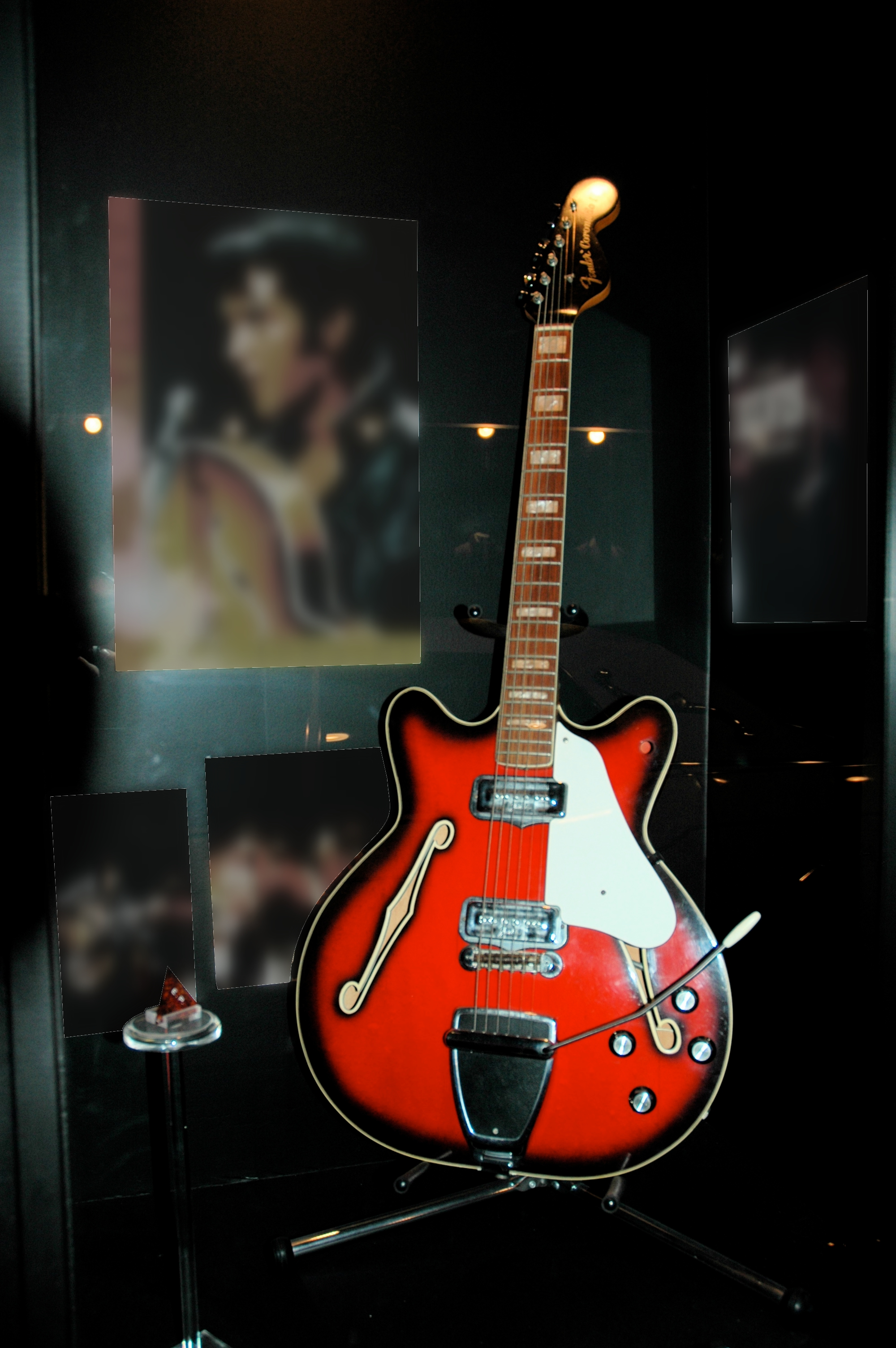
Fender Coronado II

=== Rickenbacker ===
- Rickenbacker Combo 800
- Rickenbacker Combo 600
- Rickenbacker 4000 Bass
- Rickenbacker 4001 Bass

=== Rickenbacker 300 Series ===
- Rickenbacker 325
- Rickenbacker 330
- Rickenbacker 330/12
- Rickenbacker 340
- Rickenbacker 340/12
- Rickenbacker 360
- Rickenbacker 360/12
- Rickenbacker 370
- Rickenbacker 370/12
- Rickenbacker 380L Laguna (discontinued)

=== Fender ===
- Fender King (later renamed to "Kingman")
- Fender Concert guitar
- Fender Classic
- Fender Folk Guitar
- Fender Palomino
- Fender Malibu
- Fender Coronado
- Fender Montego
- Fender Wildwood
- Fender LTD
- Fender Rosewood Telecaster
- Fender Telecaster Thinline

== Literature ==
- Rainer Kordus: Roger guitars – success story of a German luthier family, in electric guitars; special issue of the journal Guitar

== Resources ==
- Erfolgsgeschichte einer deutschen Gitarrenbauerfamilie, in: Stromgitarren; Sonderheft der Zeitschrift Gitarre & Bass zur Geschichte der E-Gitarre, S. 112–115. MM-Musik-Media-Verlag, Ulm 2004. ISSN 0934-7674
- Carlo May: Vintage-Gitarren und ihre Geschichten. Darin: Kapitel Alles Roger? – Die Rossmeisls und ihre Gitarren, S. 68–71. MM-Musik-Media-Verlag, Ulm 1994. ISBN 3-927954-10-1
