= Fender Coronado =

Electric guitar

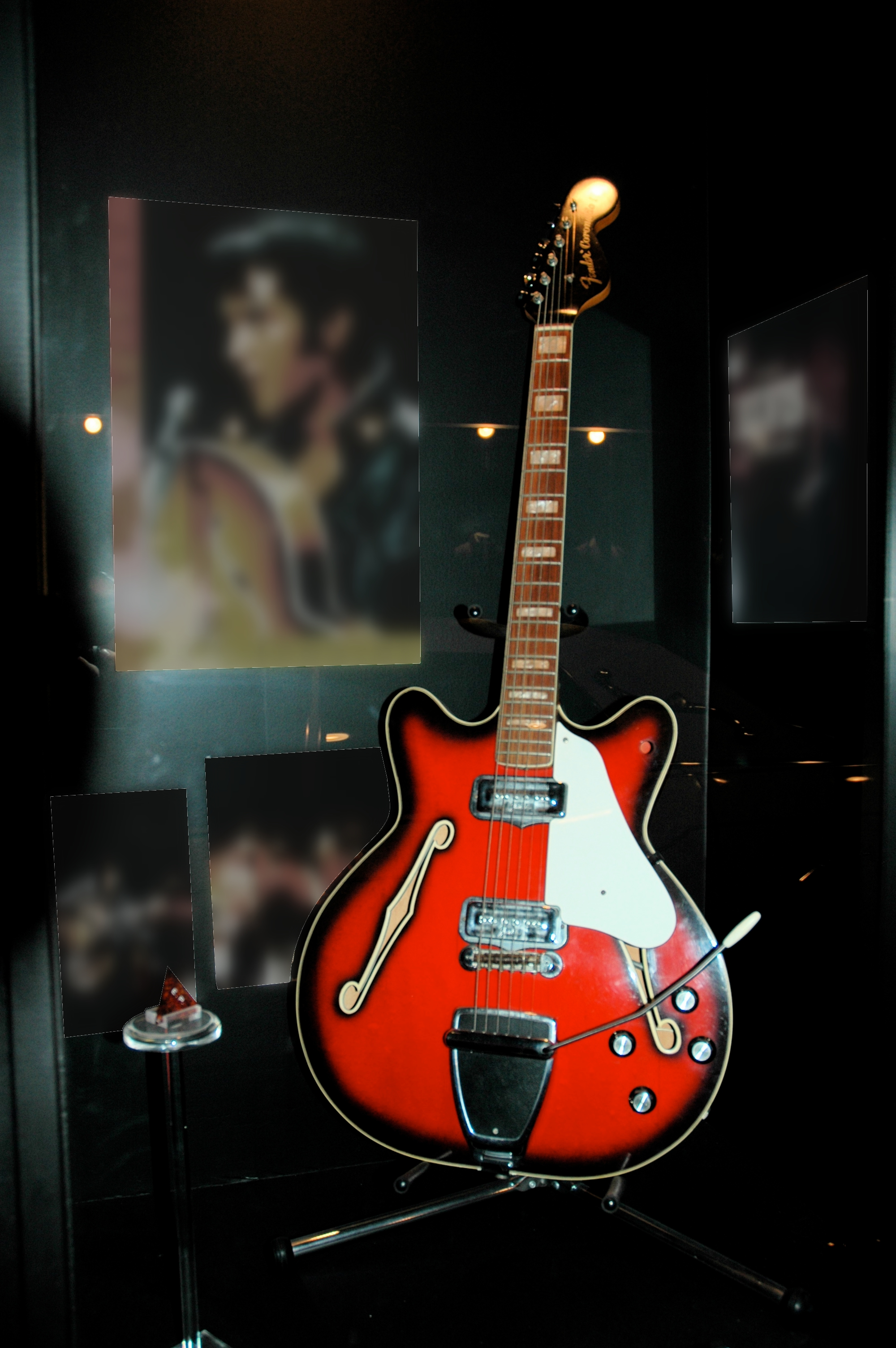
- Fender Coronado II
- Manufacturer: Fender
- Period: appr. 1966–1972, 2013–2018

Construction
- Body type: Hollow (original), Semi-hollow (reissue)
- Neck joint: Bolt-on neck
- Scale: 25.5"

Woods
- Body: Maple, Beech on Wildwood models
- Neck: Maple
- Fretboard: Rosewood

Hardware
- Bridge: Fixed or tremolo (reissue fixed only)
- Pickup(s): 1 or 2 DeArmond single coil (original), 2 Fidelitron humbuckers (reissue)

Colors available
- Sunburst, Cherry, custom colors, Wildwood

The Fender Coronado is a double-cutaway thin-line hollow-body electric guitar, announced in 1965. It is manufactured by Fender Musical Instruments Corporation. The aesthetic design embodied in the Coronado represents a departure from previous Fender instruments; the design remains an uncharacteristic piece of Fender history.

== Development and design ==
The instrument was designed by Roger Rossmeisl, who had previously also designed instruments for Rickenbacker, but who went on to create numerous models for Fender, in an attempt to capitalize on the increasing popularity of semi-acoustic guitars following the high-profile use of hollow-bodied instruments, such as the Epiphone Casino by bands such as The Beatles. During Rossmeisl's time designing for Fender, he also designed the Fender Montego, a "jazz box" style guitar which shares the Coronado's fixed F tailpiece, and the 1967 Fender Wildwood which shares the Stratocaster headstock.

Three versions of the Coronado guitar were produced from 1966 through 1972. The Fender Coronado I, discontinued in 1970, was the original single pickup design. The Coronado II had an added bridge pickup with relative tone and volume controls. The Coronado XII, released in 1967, was a twelve-string version of the guitar. Coronado basses were also manufactured.

The Coronado was a true hollow-bodied electric guitar. Like the Gibson ES-330 and Epiphone Casino, it did not have a central solid wood block in the body. This is in contrast with guitars such as the Gibson ES-335 which, although appearing similar, were constructed with a solid central block running lengthways through the archtop body.

The top, sides, and back of the body on the Wildwood body were constructed from laminated beechwood, and maple was used for the non Wildwood versions, the top being slightly arched, and featuring two generous, routed and bound "f" holes. The body of the instrument was finished in a high-gloss nitrocellulose lacquer. A number of Coronado II and Coronado XII guitars were offered in a special "Wildwood" finish. This involved specially prepared, heavily grained beechwood; a dye was injected into the growing trees, years prior to harvesting, which stained the grain pattern of the wood. Only one Blonde Coronado is known to exist, it is in a private collection in California. (If this Blonde Coronado has Black Binding, it is Olympic White that has "yellowed" over the years)

The Coronado also featured relatively thin C-shaped bolt-on maple neck, topped with a rosewood fingerboard, and a headstock shaped similarly to that of a Fender Stratocaster.

Unusual for Fender at the time, the Coronado's pickups were made by DeArmond, a company whose pickups were more usually found on Gretsch guitars, and the bridge was a free-floating, non anchored, 'tune-o-matic' style bridge, with a suspended tailpiece. Vibrato tailpieces were also available at extra cost from 1966 until the ceasing of the Coronado's production. The wiring harness used in the Fender Coronado line was manufactured by Rowe Industries of Toledo, Ohio and delivered as a completely pre-assembled set.

The Coronados all came in cases made by the Victoria Luggage Co, and were made in the USA.

The Coronado gained significant attention when used by Elvis Presley in the 1968 film Speedway, performing the song 'There Ain't Nothing Like a Song' with Nancy Sinatra in the final scene and is the only guitar used by Elvis within the entire film. Rossmeisl's Fender-creations were also used by Elvis in a separate film 'Clambake' where the Fender Wildwood is seen in two scenes.

An image of a Coronado is seen upon the Chill's compilation album 'Heavenly Pop Hit'.

Despite the expensive construction of the instrument, the Coronado achieved little success. The guitar was prone to feedback at high volumes, and the bolt-on neck construction, favoured by Fender, failed to appeal to purist jazz guitarists, who would make up a large part of the market for a hollow-bodied electric guitar. It has however gained a significant following after release for its natural resonance and bright and deep tone.

The song "Coronado II" by Polaris is named after the instrument.

== Models ==
All 6 String Guitar, 12 String Guitar and 4 String Bass.

Coronado I: one neck pickup, one volume and one tone control. Dot inlays. Available in either Cherry Red, Sunburst, or any DuPont custom finish.

Coronado II: two pickups—neck and bridge positions—two volume and two tone controls, as well as a three-position selector switch. Block inlays. Optional tremolo. Cherry, Sunburst, DuPont custom colors. Only one Blonde Coronado is known to exist, it is in a private collection in California. (If this Blonde Coronado has Black Binding, it is Olympic White that has "yellowed" over the years). The body and neck wood is maple with a Rosewood fingerboard and mother-of-pearl block inlays and a Fender Jazzmaster style headstock.

Coronado II Wildwood: The same as the Coronado II but with 6 colors of dyed Beechwood front, back and sides. The colors were indicated by Roman numerals and were really a guide only as every one looks totally different – 'I' – Green, 'II' – Gold and Brown, 'III' – Gold and Purple, 'IV' – Dark Blue, 'V' – Purple Blue and 'VI' – Blue Green. (an acoustic model named 'Wildwood' was made at the same time based on the Kingman using the dyed wildwood beech on the back and sides and a spruce top however early models sometimes had a wildwood top as well. The Wildwood was solid and not a veneer as suggested elsewhere). All Wildwoods featured maple necks, Rosewood fingerboards and Mother-of-Pearl block inlays. Some Kingman models from 1969 (not listed as Wildwoods) also used Wildwood back and sides and at least one 1971 Fender Telecaster used the Wildwood as a Veneer stuck onto an Alder body but this was never put into full production. Rogers Drums also used the 'Wildwood' Beechwood for a very small production of their Drums including the famous 'Dynasonic' Snare in the late 60s.

Coronado XII: two pickups—neck and bridge positions—two volume and two tone controls, as well as a three-position selector switch. Block inlays. Fender curved twelve string "hockey stick" headstock. Cherry, Sunburst, DuPont custom colours and six shades of Wildwood.

Coronado Bass I: bass version of the Coronado I. Has one neck pickup, one volume and one tone control. Dot inlays. Available in either Cherry Red, Sunburst, or any custom finish.

Coronado Bass II: bass version of the Coronado II. Has two pickups—neck and bridge positions—two volume and two tone controls, as well as a three-position selector switch. Has 21 frets. Available in Cherry, Sunburst, Wildwood, or a DuPont custom finish. The body and neck wood is maple with a Rosewood fingerboard and mother-of-pearl block inlays.

=== Options and variations ===
Fender Fantasy and Aztec: These were the 2 names planned before the name "Coronado" was selected. Early guitars often have no model name on the headstock, but rather simply "Fender". Several early Coronado II models saw the pickup toggle switch installed near the guitars' volume and tone knobs, rather than in the standard cutaway position. Additionally, due to issues with binding adhesive burning the wooden body, guitars were available in antigua finishes; rumored to have been specifically created to hide these marks. These included shading the body's outer edges and around the f holes.

Antigua: was a dark gray to cream finish to hide burned wood. The color remained through the life of the Coronado, and near the end, "Antigua" became the model name of the Coronado because it was the only (last) color available.

Candy Apple Red Burst (unofficial name): was created by shading (bursting) the edges, sides, and FHoles with metallic silver, then applying the stock see-through cherry red over it. This created a car look over the silver. There are a few red to black Antigua Coronado IIs.

Maple Board with Black Blocks and Binding: This was a catalogue option on the Coro II Bass and Guitar (including Wildwood) that has rarely been seen. Only a special Coro built by George Fullerton has been documented with this neck.

Black Body Binding: Olympic white coronados had black body and FHole binding. The only other Fenders to have black binding were the Custom Telecaster and Custom Esquire in olympic white. (Coro I in olympic white did not have bound FHoles.)

Sunburst Neck: On a few of the earliest Coro I and IIs, you will find the back of the neck sprayed in a matching sunburst (very rare on a II). At least one Cherry Red with Cherry Red neck Coro I was made.

== Users ==
- Elvis Presley
- Charley Pride
- Alex St. Clair
- Thom Yorke and Colin Greenwood of Radiohead both used the Fender Coronado Bass.
- Natalie Prass plays a Wildwood III model.
- Kostas Tournas
- Suzie Higgie, Falling Joys
- Ben Schneider of Lord Huron
- Steve Kilbey of The Church played a Coronado Bass
- Taylor York of Paramore.
- Jeff Lang
- Mike Doughty of Soul Coughing
- Courtney Taylor-Taylor of The Dandy Warhols
- Rose McDowall of Strawberry Switchblade
- Conor Curley of Fontaines D.C.
- Noah Kahan regularly plays an Antigua model in concert.
- Black Pumas
- Phil Upchurch
- Kevin Morby

== 2013 reissue ==
In 2013 Fender reissued the Coronado guitar and bass. They are part of their Modern Player series of products. Only the two pickup models are available and they use Fidelitron pickups instead of the original DeArmond ones. In addition the current guitars feature a semi-hollowbody (using a centre block) contrary to the fully hollow bodies of the originals.
