= Fender King =

American guitar model (1963-1971)

- Manufacturer: Fender
- Period: 1963-1971

Construction
- Body type: Dreadnought
- Neck joint: Bolt-on

Woods
- Body: Sitka Spruce top Mahogany back and sides
- Neck: Maple
- Fretboard: Rosewood

Hardware
- Bridge: Rosewood

Colors available
- Natural, Sunburst

The Fender King guitar was a flat-top acoustic guitar introduced by the Fender company in 1963, designed by the influential German guitar builder/designer Roger Rossmeisl. The guitar was re-introduced in 1966 as the Fender Kingman, and discontinued in 1971. Fender King guitars were sequentially numbered and the number placed on the back of the guitar on a small metal plate.

As the name suggests the King was the top of Fender's nascent acoustic guitar line introduced in late 1963 as the folk boom took hold of the market. In its acoustic line the standard Fender bolt-on neck design was carried over from the company's popular array of electric guitars and basses. This unique configuration married a high quality neck more akin to a Fender electric guitar than a typical acoustic instrument attached to a standard sized acoustic dreadnought body. Due to this unusual configuration a "tone bar" (derisively termed a "broomstick") of aluminum had to be added through the body for structural rigidity. In 1965-66 the name "King" was changed to "Kingman" and finally discontinued with the entire critically derided and poorly selling acoustic line in 1971.

The King was available in a variety of high quality woods including Brazilian Rosewood and later included in the bizarre "Wildwood" line of multi-colored dyed wood finishes offered by Fender at the time. The King/Kingman followed the standard Fender changes in neck inlays and hardware design changes which also help to date the instruments as serial numbers varied widely and offer little indication as to actual date of manufacture.
