= Philip Kubicki Factor Bass =

Electric bass guitar brand

Ex Factor Bass
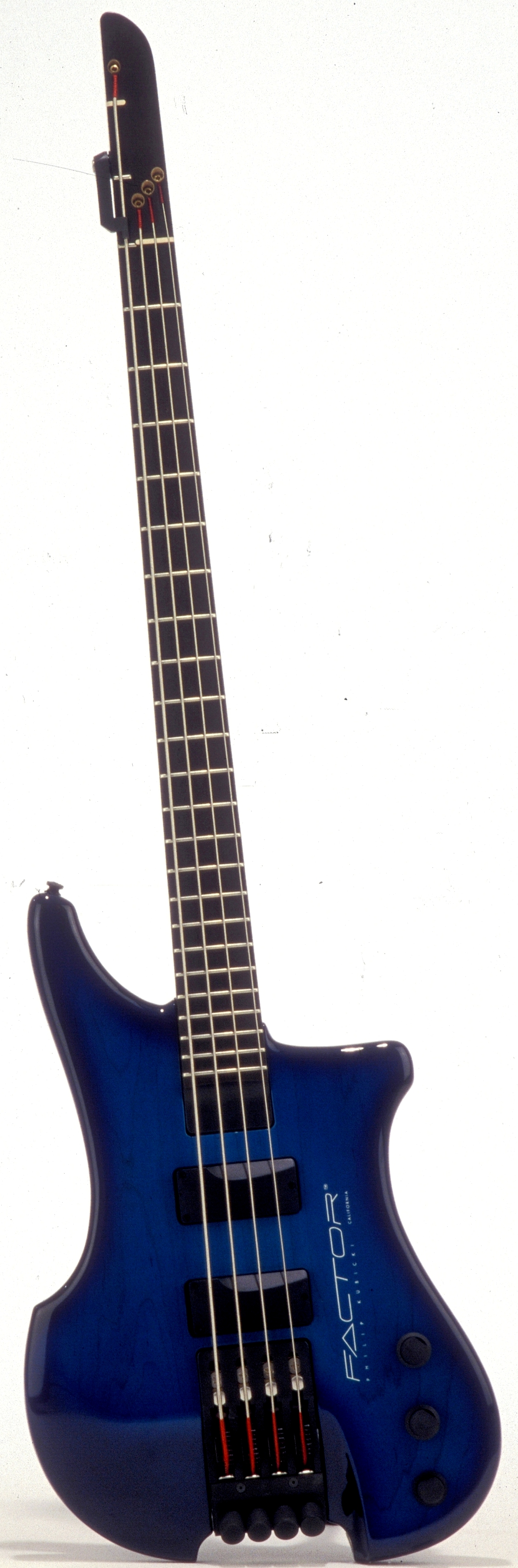
- Manufacturer: Kubicki
- Period: 1983 - present

Construction
- Body type: Solid
- Neck joint: Bolt-on

Woods
- Neck: maple
- Fretboard: ebony

Hardware
- Bridge: Fixed, with tuning machines
- Pickup(s): two humbucking

Key Factor 4 and 5
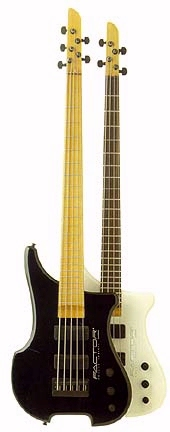
- Manufacturer: Kubicki

Construction
- Body type: Solid
- Neck joint: Bolt-on

Woods
- Neck: maple
- Fretboard: maple or rosewood

Hardware
- Bridge: Fixed
- Pickup(s): two humbucking

The Philip Kubicki Factor Bass is a brand of electric bass guitar made in America and sold factory-direct. Bass guitars designed by Kubicki are distinguished by a unique tuning module located in the body of the bass guitar rather than the headstock, as seen on most bass guitars today. The design criteria are based on human factors, or ergonomics, and the belief that a musical instrument should be inspirational to the player.

== History ==
=== First classical guitars – 1959 to 1961 ===
Phil Kubicki (correct pronunciation: [kuˈbit͡ski]) first became interested in guitars when he saw Andrés Segovia playing classical guitar on TV and then saw his first guitar on family visits to his grandparents' house. "For some reason my grandfather had a guitar in the closet," recalls Philip. "And that's where I'd head: to play with that guitar. It had one string that was a mile off the fingerboard. I think all of us instrument makers have had that kind of fascination - some little spark, back at the very beginning."

A few years later, while Kubicki was in high school in Whittier, California, a friend introduced him to Ernie Drumheller. "His hobby was making guitars. He invited my friend and me to come to his shop on Saturdays, and he taught us how to make guitars. I took off with it and built a half dozen classical guitars during my high school years."

=== Fender years – 1964 to 1973 ===
In 1964, while attending Fullerton Junior College, close to Fender Musical Instruments, Kubicki took a factory tour, filled out an application, and was hired by Roger Rossmeisl to work with him in his Acoustic Guitar Division. Rossmeisl then became head of the Research & Development for acoustic and electric guitars and asked Phil to be his assistant. The R&D position led to many prototypical, experimental instruments like the Fender Telecaster Thinline, the electric violin, the LTD and Montego Jazz guitars, and the first rosewood Telecaster for George Harrison and the first rosewood Stratocaster for Jimi Hendrix – which was the last guitar Fender made for Jimi Hendrix. In late 1973, Kubicki left Fender to start his own business.

=== Early independent career – 1973 to 1982 ===
The early products created after leaving Fender were acoustic guitars and various guitar-making supplies. During this time, an acoustic guitar and a dulcimer were made for Joni Mitchell. Until 1985, the primary products were guitar-making supplies that evolved into the manufacture of bodies and necks emulating the Fender design. Short-scale guitars called the "Arrow" and "Express" were a major effort during this period resulting in 275 numbered instruments.

=== The Factor Bass – 1983 to present ===
The ambition to make a line of original instruments began in 1983, culminating in the Factor bass. The first production model was sold in January 1985. Stuart Hamm, winner of the Bass Players' Best Bassist in both jazz and rock, gave more credence to the instrument. Worldwide recognition began when Vail Johnson, playing in Kenny G's band, toured internationally playing his Ex Factor bass. By this point, production of the Factor bass could not meet demand. In 1988, a licensing agreement between Kubicki and Fender Musical Instruments was established for the manufacture and sale of the Factor bass by Fender that lasted until 1991. During this period, the main emphasis was on the development of the Key Factor 4 and 5 string basses as well as other prototypes. As soon as the Fender contract ended Kubicki was immediately back in production selling its Factor bass line.

Until recently, Phil Kubicki concentrated on filling special orders making custom Ex Factor basses with deluxe wood veneers. Factor basses are made in America and sold factory direct.

Philip Kubicki was a renowned guitar designer and builder who was active in the musical-instrument industry for more than 50 years. He died March 18, 2013, at his home in Laconia, New Hampshire. He was 69 years old and had been diagnosed with stage four pancreatic cancer in mid January.

== Design criteria ==
Human factors were the inspiration for the Factor bass. The design criteria were to develop a bass that:

- Was balanced to naturally rest in playing position and was absolutely not head heavy
- Could be fine-tuned with a body-mounted tuner
- Offered a quick way to "D" tune the bass without changing string tension or having to transpose
- Had a neck that was more stable than solid wood without resorting to the heavy, cold, non-adjustable, and expensive graphite alternative
- Used only unique, in house-designed electronic components
- Eliminated fingerboard position markers
- Used no retrofit parts
- Had an original outward appearance that would be aesthetically pleasing

== Patents and innovations ==
The design criteria resulted in these unique features:

- a patented bridge tuner device
- a patented string clasp "D" string tuning mechanism
- a design patent for the overall Factor bass design
- a 32 piece rotary-cut laminated veneer neck
- integrated multi-function, 18V powered circuit board that uses a rotary switch to select one of the six positions available from the humbucking pick-ups
- unique neck side dashes that eliminate and replace fingerboard position markers
- all in-house designed knobs, pick-ups, bridge tuner parts, etc.
