= Gibson J-160E =

Acoustic-electric guitar

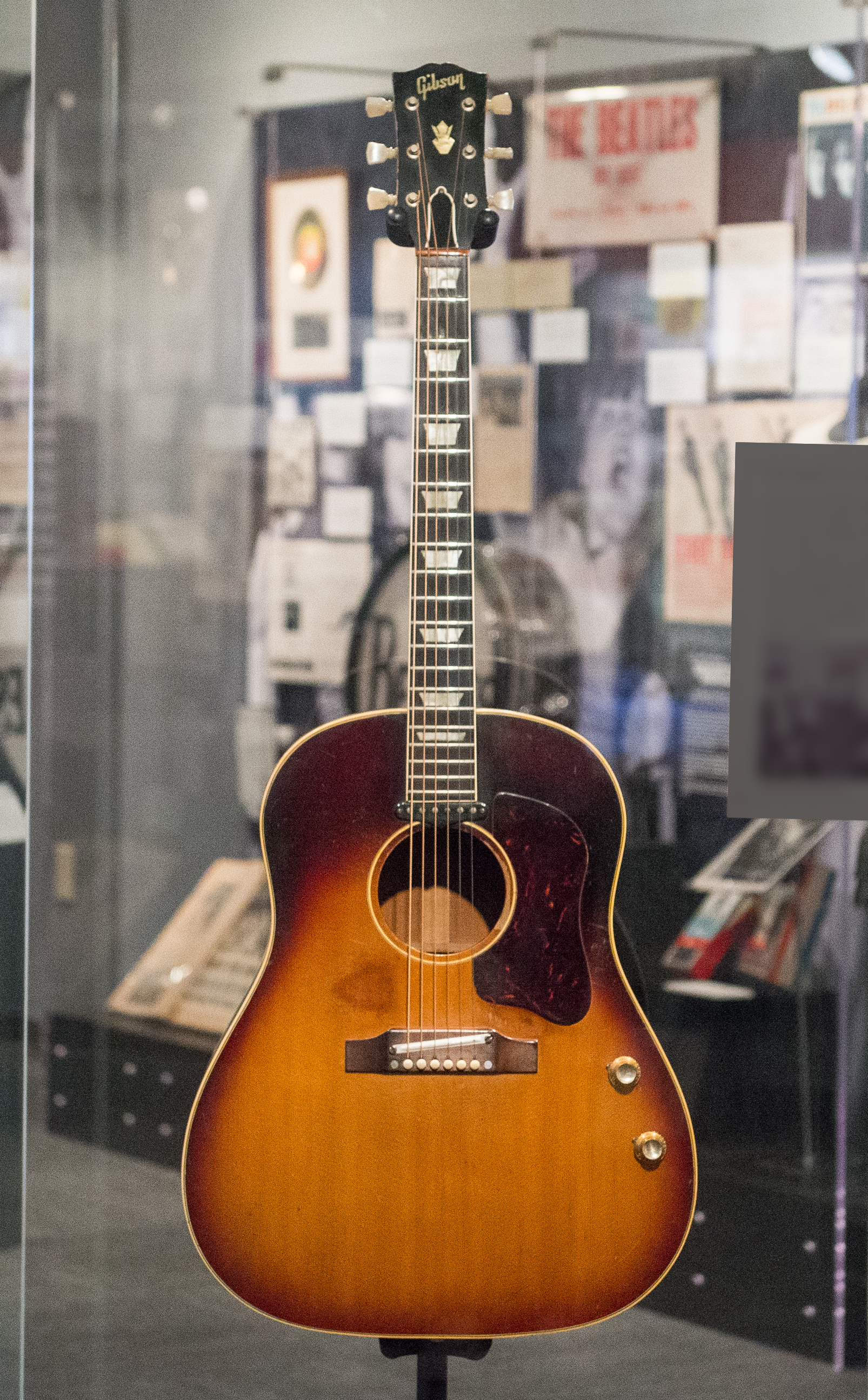
- John Lennon's 1962 Gibson J-160E
- Manufacturer: Gibson
- Period: 1954–present

Construction
- Body type: Round-shoulder dreadnought
- Neck joint: Dovetail

Woods
- Body: Sitka Spruce top Mahogany back and sides
- Neck: Mahogany
- Fretboard: Rosewood

Hardware
- Bridge: Rosewood
- Pickup: uncovered P-90

Colors available
- Natural, Heritage Cherry Sunburst, Vintage Sunburst

The Gibson J-160E is one of the first acoustic-electric guitars produced by the Gibson Guitar Corporation.

The J-160E was Gibson's second attempt at creating an acoustic-electric guitar (the first being the small-body CF-100E). The basic concept behind the guitar was to fit a single-pickup into a normal-size dreadnought acoustic guitar. The J-160E used plywood for most of the guitar's body, and was ladder-braced, whereas other acoustic Gibsons were X-braced. The rosewood fingerboard had trapezoid inlays, and the guitar had an adjustable bridge. For amplification, a single-coil pickup (an uncovered P-90 pickup) was installed under the top of the body with the pole screws protruding through the top at the end of the fingerboard, with a volume and a tone knob.

John Lennon and George Harrison frequently used one with The Beatles, both on stage and in the recording studio and their J-160E models (Lennon had two, as his original 1962 model was stolen at the end of 1963 and replaced with a newer model in early 1964) are probably the only guitars that have the distinction of being used on every Beatles album between 1963 and 1969. This model was also used by other famous British bands/artists during the 1960s and later, including The Hollies, Peter and Gordon, Dave Dee, Dozy, Beaky, Mick & Tich and Elvis Costello. Paul McCartney can be seen using a J-160E (made at the end of the 1960s) in footage that was recorded at High Park Farm in Scotland in early June 1971, so this Gibson model has the distinction of being used by three members of The Beatles, just like the Epiphone Casino. Gibson re-released a standard J-160E and also a John Lennon J-160E Peace model in the late 1990s, the latter based on the 1964 J-160E (it had its finish removed in 1968) that Lennon a.o. used during the Bed-In days of 1969. Epiphone also makes an EJ-160E John Lennon replica signature model since the end of the 1990s.

== See also ==
- List of most valuable celebrity memorabilia
