= Fender Wildwood =

- Manufacturer: Fender
- Period: 1966-1971

Construction
- Body type: Dreadnought
- Neck joint: Dovetail

Woods
- Body: Sitka Spruce top Mahogany back and sides
- Neck: Mahogany
- Fretboard: Rosewood

Hardware
- Bridge: Rosewood

Colors available
- Natural, Sunburst

The Fender Wildwood guitar was a flat-top acoustic guitar introduced by the Fender company in 1966. (See also the Fender Coronado which had a Wildwood model.)

== History ==
The Wildwood was a variation on the Fender King guitar, featuring a variety of dyed wood colors. The unique color patterns were achieved by injecting living beech trees with dye prior to being harvested to make the veneer for the back, sides, top and headstock. "Wildwood" guitars were available in gold, brown, purple, dark blue, purple-blue, green or blue-green. Fender offered other acoustic and electric models with the same veneer option, adding "Wildwood" to the model name (often noted on the pick guard) as with the "Wildwood" Fender Coronado.

Fender "Wildwood II's", like other Fender acoustic guitars of the time, were unique in that the neck of the acoustic guitar was the same as those used on Fender electric guitars and bolted to a block inside the acoustic guitar body. A "resonator bar" extended inside the body from the neck block to the bottom of the guitar, which reportedly benefited the tone of the guitar. Charlie Pride played a green Wildwood II onstage during the height of his career in the late 1960s.

Fender marketed an attachable pickup ref. FP-6 for this range and other flat-top acoustic guitars having the 'resonator bar', to which the pickup was attached. It was manufactured by Rowe Industries of Toledo, Ohio. The pickup is electromagnetic with integral volume and tone controls, and is finished in chrome, embossed 'Fender'. See www.musicpickups.com/Fender.html for photo and notes.

The guitar was discontinued in 1971.
