= Rickenbacker 325 =

Electric guitar

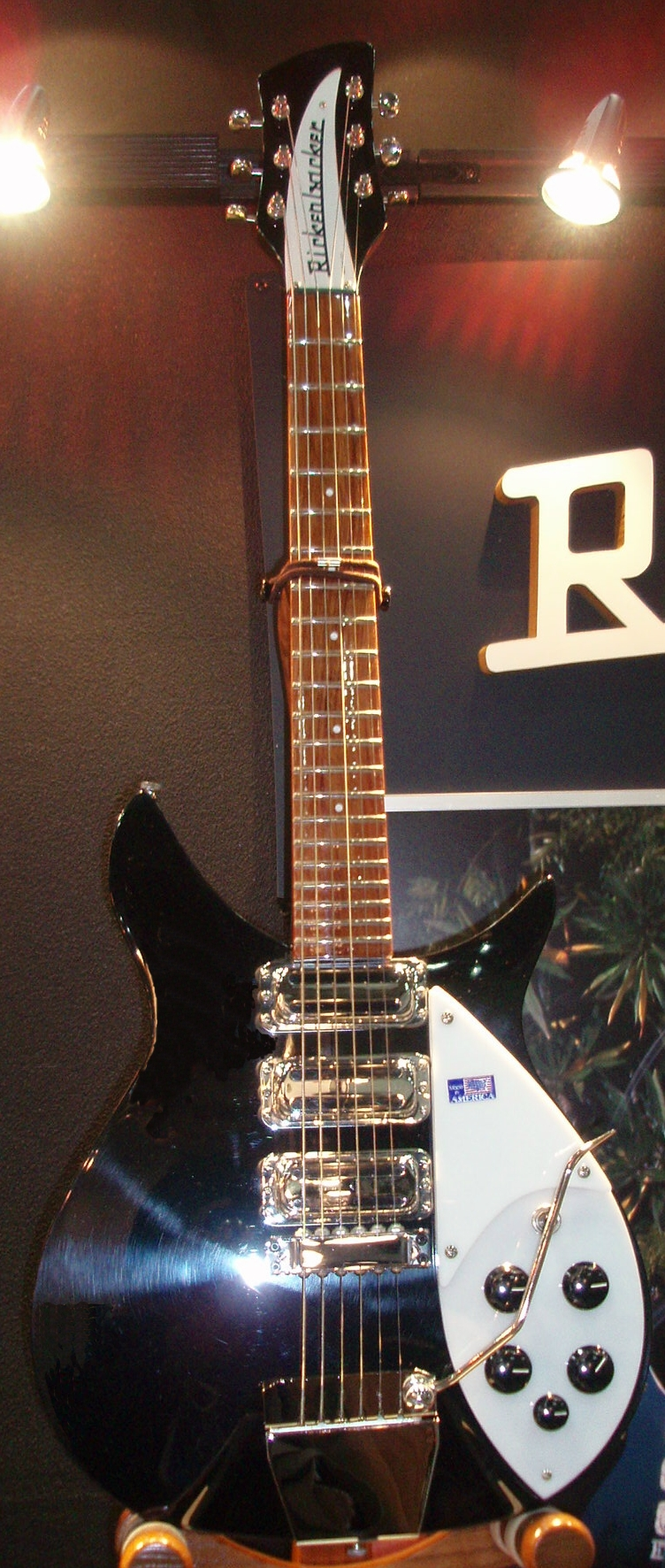
- Rickenbacker 325C64 (A reissue of the 1964 model 325 played by John Lennon)
- Manufacturer: Rickenbacker
- Period: 1958–present

Construction
- Body type: Semi-hollow
- Neck joint: Set-in
- Scale: 20 3/4 inches (530 mm)

Woods
- Body: Maple; alder on 50s instruments & reissues.
- Neck: Maple; alder on 50s instruments & reissues.
- Fretboard: Bubinga (1960s–2000s), Padauk (late 1950s), Chechen (current).

Hardware
- Bridge: 3-way
- Pickup: Three single-coil pickups

Colors available
- Mapleglo (natural), Jetglo (black), Fireglo (red sunburst)

The Rickenbacker 325 is the first of the Capri series of hollow body guitars released in 1958 by Rickenbacker.

== Overview ==
The 325 was designed by Roger Rossmeisl, a guitar craftsman from a family of German instrument makers. Production models had a 20 3/4-inch (530 mm) short scale which essentially makes it a Six-string alto guitar in Sizing, dot fretboard inlays, and a small (12 3/4-inch-wide [320 mm]) body. The body is unbound, semi-hollow, with an angled sound hole, and boasts "crescent moon"-style cutaways. These instruments gained prominence due to John Lennon's use of a 325 during the early years of The Beatles. Lennon's 1958 model was among the first batch made and has the pre-production feature of a solid top with no sound hole. All subsequent production short-scale 300-series Rickenbackers (310, 315, 320, 325) had sound holes until the late 1970s. This series is currently available only in "C" reissue form, although the reissues lack a sound hole to mimic Lennon's instrument. Multi-instrumentalist Toots Thielemans regularly played Rickenbacker guitars and his usage of a Combo 400 model inspired John Lennon, a fan of Thielemans, to take up the instrument. A photograph of Thielemans at a 1958 US trade shows a 325 that is likely to have been the very guitar later purchased by Lennon in Hamburg.

== Notable players ==
- John Lennon played 325s and their assorted variants during the 1960s (Including a 12-string made to match his second 325). A replica of Lennon's 325 is available as a guitar controller for The Beatles: Rock Band.
- Susanna Hoffs of The Bangles played the 325 and its full scale variant, the model 350.
- John Fogerty played his modified Fireglo 325 on many Creedence Clearwater Revival songs and live concerts, including their appearance at the 1969 Woodstock festival. Fogerty modified his model to include a Gibson humbucker pickup and a Bigsby vibrato.
- Maurice Gibb of Bee Gees used the 325 for all live performances between the late 1980s until 2003.
- Dave Gregory of XTC used a 1964 Rose-Morris 1996 model (the export equivalent of the 325) on several XTC and Dukes of Stratosphear recordings, notably "Wake Up", "I Bought Myself A Liarbird", and "Vanishing Girl".
- Donovan played the 325 throughout the late 1960s.

== Gallery ==
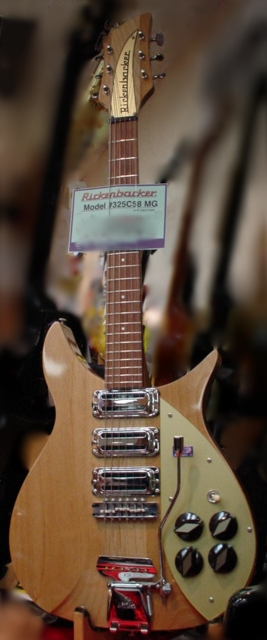
325C58 MG
A replica of the 1958 model played by John Lennon

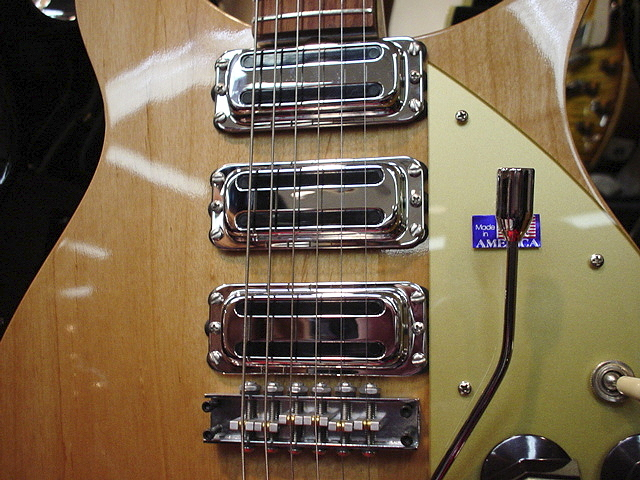
325C58 MG(Pickup Zoom)

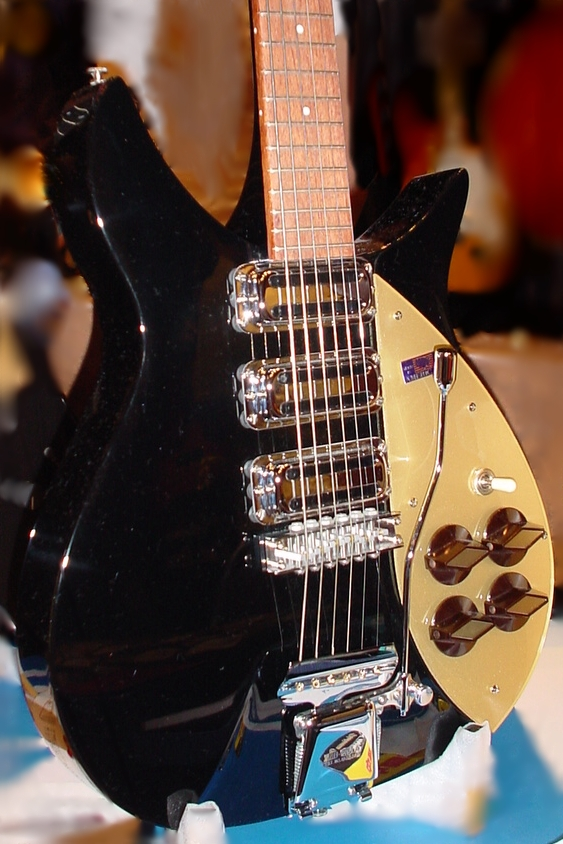
325C58 JG
A replica of another 1958 model played by John Lennon, technically called the "Hamburg" model

== See also ==
John Lennon's musical instruments
