= Epiphone Casino =

Electric guitar

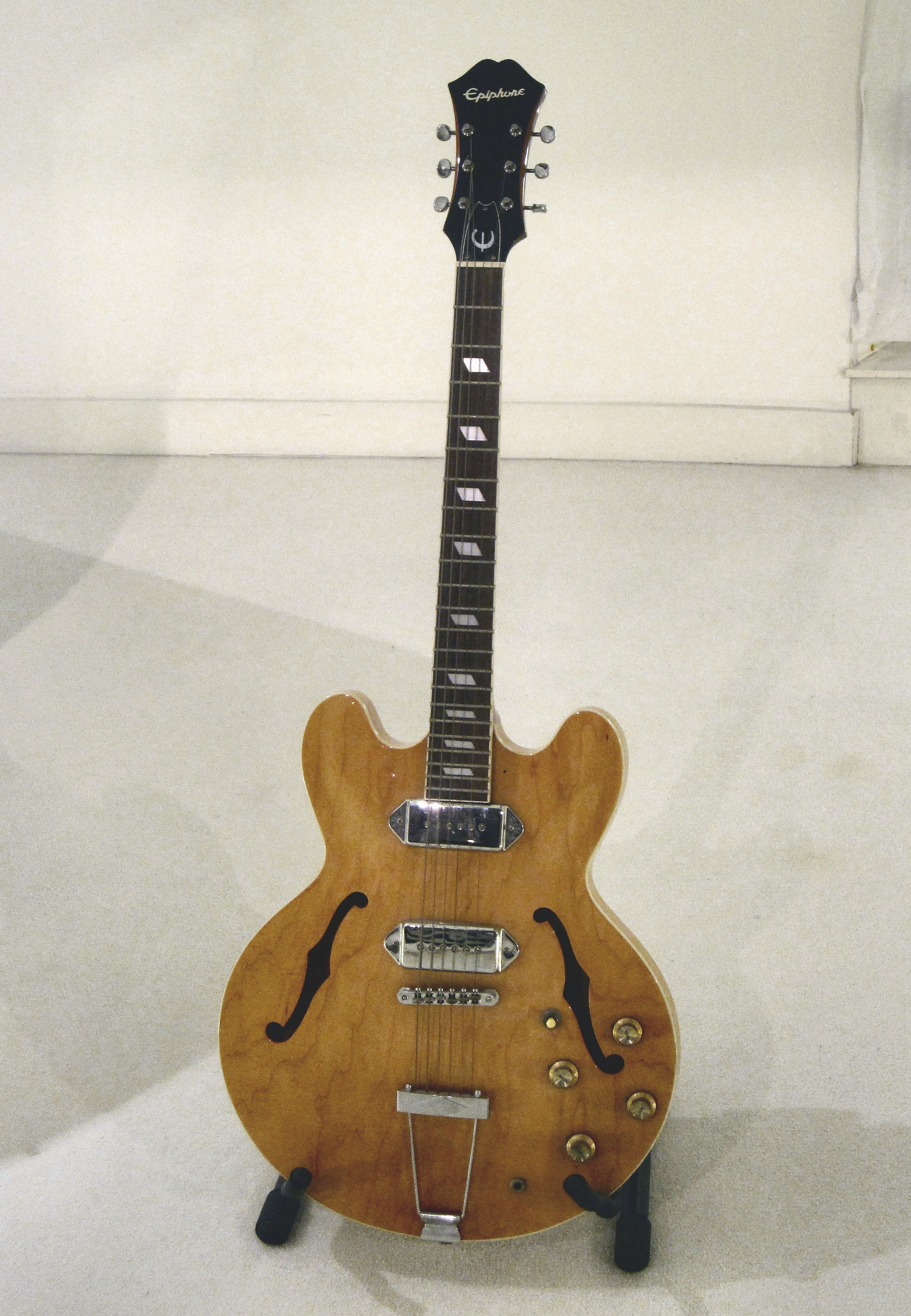
- Manufacturer: Epiphone
- Period: 1961–present

Construction
- Body type: hollow
- Neck joint: Set
- Scale: 24.75" with 12" fretboard radius

Woods
- Body: maple (laminated)
- Neck: mahogany on most models in most periods; sometimes maple
- Fretboard: rosewood on most models, ebony on some

Hardware
- Bridge: adjustable Tune-o-Matic style saddle, trapeze tailpiece.
- Pickup: 2 P-90s

Colors available
- Natural, Cherry, Sunburst, Turquoise

The Epiphone Casino is a thinline hollow body electric guitar manufactured by Epiphone, a branch of Gibson. The guitar debuted in 1961 and has been associated with such guitarists as Howlin' Wolf, Phil Upchurch, George Harrison, John Lennon, Paul McCartney, Noel Gallagher, Johnny Marr, Keith Richards, Dave Davies, Brad Whitford, Shirley Manson, Paul Weller, The Edge, Josh Homme, Daniel Kessler, Brendon Urie, Gary Clark, Jr., Glenn Frey, John Illsley, and Peter Green.

== Construction ==
Casinos have been manufactured in the United States, Japan, Korea and China. The Casino, also designated by Epiphone as model E230TD, is a thinline hollow-bodied guitar with either one or two Gibson P-90 pick-ups. Although generally fitted with a trapeze-type tailpiece, often a Bigsby vibrato tailpiece is used in its place (either as a factory direct feature or as an aftermarket upgrade). Unlike semi-hollow body guitars such as the Gibson ES-335, which have a center block to promote sustain and reduce feedback, the Casino and its cousin, the Gibson ES-330 are true hollow-bodied guitars. This makes it lighter, and louder when played without an amplifier, but more prone to feedback than semi-hollow or solid-body electrics. The Casino neck joins the body at the 16th fret instead of the 19th like on the Gibson ES models.

Through 1970, the Casino headstock was set at a 17-degree angle and the top was made of five laminated layers of maple, birch, maple, birch, and maple. With the exception of the John Lennon models, subsequent Casinos have been made with 14-degree headstock angle with five layer all maple laminated tops. Current versions have a laminated maple top, sides, and back, and a mahogany neck.

Per the Epiphone String Gauge Guide, the Casino comes with string gauges (from high to low): 0.010" 0.013" 0.017" 0.026" 0.036" 0.046".

== Use by the Beatles ==
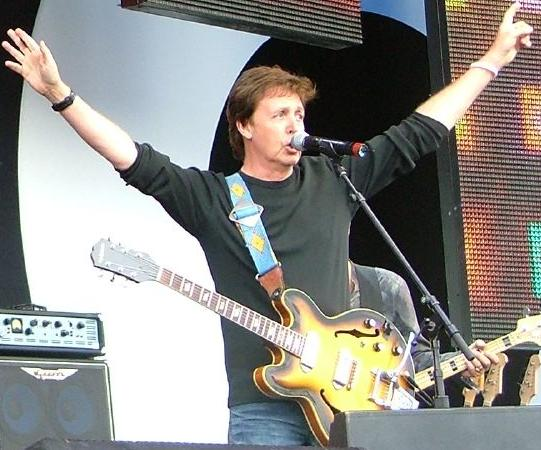
Paul McCartney playing a Casino at Live 8 in 2005.

In 1964, Paul McCartney, The Beatles' bass player, was the first Beatle to acquire a Casino (a 1962 model), using it for his studio forays into guitar work, including his guitar solos on "Ticket to Ride" (1965), "Drive My Car" (1965) and "Taxman" (1966); he also played it on “Helter Skelter” (1968).

In 1965 John Lennon and George Harrison bought 1965 Casinos. Harrison's came from the factory fitted with a Bigsby vibrato.

Lennon used the Epiphone Casino as his main electric instrument during the remainder of his time with the Beatles, replacing the Rickenbacker 325. In 1967 Lennon and Harrison had the pickguard removed during the making of Magical Mystery Tour album. In 1968 when the band were traveling in India, Donovan told Lennon and Harrison that sanding the finish off their Casinos would improve the tone. They did so before making the double album The Beatles. In the early seventies, Lennon replaced the original nickel Kluson tuners on his Casino with a set of gold Grover machine heads.

McCartney's 1962 Casino, kept in the original sunburst finish, is still owned by him and occasionally used live. Like Harrison's Casino, McCartney's came with a factory-installed Bigsby vibrato.

== Current Casinos ==
Epiphone currently builds several versions of the Casino. These include:

- Regular "Archtop-Series" Casino made in China and uses non-American made parts (Korea until 2007)
- In 2021, a Gibson USA made Epiphone Casino became available.
- In 2023, Epiphone released a new Chinese-made Casino as part of the Original Collection.
