= Tremolo (disambiguation) =

Tremolo is a musical technique.

Tremolo may also refer to:

== Music ==
- Tremolo (electronic effect), an electronic effect on some guitars
- The Tremeloes, a British pop group
- Tremolo (album), a 1997 album by Blue Rodeo
- Tremolo (EP), a 1991 EP by My Bloody Valentine
- Tremolo harmonica
- Tremolo arm or whammy bar, a device for shifting the bridge of a guitar to produce pitch-bending or vibrato
  - Floyd Rose locking tremolo
  - Ibanez RG Tremolo, a series of guitars
  - Kahler Tremolo System
  - Stetsbar Guitar Tremolo

== Other uses ==
- Tremolo (comics), a character in the Marvel Universe
