= Roland Jazz Chorus =

Guitar amplifier

Roland Jazz Chorus-120

Roland Jazz Chorus (JC) is the name given to a series of solid-state instrument amplifiers produced by the Roland Corporation in Japan since 1975. Its name comes from its built-in analog chorus effect. The Jazz Chorus series became increasingly popular in the late 1970s and early 1980s new wave and post-punk scenes because of its clean yet powerful sound, durability and relatively low cost when compared to the more commonly used tube amplifiers of the time such as Marshall or Fender. It also found favour amongst funk players in America. It also became popular to use for clean tones in heavy metal, with the most famous users being James Hetfield and Kirk Hammett from Metallica, and Wes Borland from Limp Bizkit.

Most models have controls based on the JC-120's standard setup. There are two channels, one clean, the other with effects. The built-in effects include stereo chorus, vibrato, reverb, and distortion. The amplifier features high and low inputs, a bright switch as well as a three band equalizer and volume for each channel.

For the first 40 years of the series' existence, all models were purely analog, transistor-based designs. However, the JC-40 and JC-22 models (introduced in the 2010s) depart from this in favour of an entirely digital signal processing (DSP)-based design, similar to other current Roland and Boss amplifiers.

== Timeline ==
Since its inception in 1975, the Roland Jazz Chorus amplifier has undergone several design iterations.

1975 JC-120, 120 watts, 2x12" speakers; JC-60, 60 watts, 1x12" speaker

1976 JC-160, 120 watts, 4x10" speakers; JC-80 60 watts, 1x15" speaker

1978 JC-200, 200W (head); JC-200S, 2x12" speakers (cabinet);

1979 JC-50, 50 watts, 1x12" speaker

1984 JC-120H, 120W head (“Bright” switch changed to “HI-TREBLE”); JC-77, 80 watts, 2x10" speakers

1986 JC-55, 50 watts, 2x8" speakers

1992 JC-20, 20 watts, 2x5" speakers

1996 JC-85, 80 watts, 2x10" speakers

1997 JC-90, 80 watts, 2x10" speakers (Eminence speakers)

2015 JC-40, 40 watts, 2x10’’, (introduced stereo input)

2016 JC-22, 30 watts, 2x6.5" speakers

2025 JC-120, DAW Software Plugin

== Notable users ==
The first Jazz Chorus prototype was created for Joni Mitchell around 1976, when she was working on Hejira (album) and The Last Waltz. She loved its chorus sound, as did Jaco Pastorius, who was playing with her at the time.

Once in production, the Jazz Chorus became one of the most famous and successful combo amplifiers from its period and its earliest users included Alex Lifeson, Albert King, Andy Summers (The Police), Chuck Hammer (Lou Reed), Larry Coryell, Robert Smith (of The Cure, although he used the rarer 160 Watt JC-160 with 4 x 10" speakers), Billy Duffy (The Cult, Theatre of Hate), Roger Hodgson of Supertramp, Joe Strummer, John Sebastian of The Lovin' Spoonful, Art Saiz, Chuck Willis, Prince, John McGeoch (Magazine, Siouxsie and the Banshees, PIL, the Armoury Show), Steve Hackett, Robert Fripp, Adrian Belew, Steve Rothery, Mdou Moctar, Neil Halstead (Slowdive) and Wayne Hussey (the Sisters of Mercy, The Mission) among others. Summers' use of the amp in turn inspired, for instance, Jeff Buckley, whose first amplifier was a Jazz Chorus.

Another notable user of the JC-120 was Johnny Marr of The Smiths who used the Roland JC-120 along with his Rickenbacker 330 and Telecaster to create the sounds present on The Smiths’ debut album. Other users include Steve Levine, producer of bands such as Culture Club, The Beach Boys and The Clash. He often combined it with effects pedals from Boss Corporation, a Roland subsidiary.

== See also ==
- Boss Corporation
- Effects unit
- Guitar amplifier
- Rock music
