= Dive bomb (guitar technique) =

Guitar technique lowering pitch

Dive bomb effect
Dive bomb effect, a typical deep pitch bend using a whammy bar, followed by string noise.

Dive bomb is a guitar technique in which the tremolo bar, or whammy bar, is used to rapidly lower the pitch of a note, creating a sound considered to be similar to a bomb dropping. One of the most recognized pioneers of this technique is Jimi Hendrix. Other musicians who used this technique are Ritchie Blackmore, Dave Murray, Herman Li, Eddie Van Halen, Randy Rhoads, Brian May, Joe Satriani and Tom Scholz of Boston. Some guitarists, such as K.K. Downing, Glenn Tipton, Jeff Hanneman and Dimebag Darrell have used a variation of this technique in which a harmonic, most commonly a pinch harmonic, is used instead of a normal fretted or open note creating a sound arguably closer to that of a bomb due to the squealing sound created by the harmonic.

It is usually best performed when using a locking tremolo (whammy bar) such as the Floyd Rose version so that rapid changes in string tension do not take the strings out of tune. This allows the guitarist to pick a note, and widely vary its tone, either by quickly pushing (or pulling) the bar as far as it goes either way or slowly moving the bar in the desired direction, depending on what effect the musician is trying to achieve. It is commonly done in combination with a pinch harmonic to get a more dramatic effect with the dive bomb.

Dive bombing is used in surf music. Dive bombing was used in Billy Idol's song "White Wedding", Rage Against the Machine's song "Calm Like a Bomb", Boston's "Smokin'", The Black Keys' song "Lonely Boy", George Thorogood's cover of Bo Diddley's "Who Do You Love?", The Rip Chords "Hey Little Cobra", and Van Halen's "Eruption".
