= Vibrato systems for guitar =

Mechanical device used to change the pitch of guitar strings

A vibrato system on a guitar is a mechanical device used to temporarily change the pitch of the strings. It adds vibrato to the sound by changing the tension of the strings, typically at the bridge or tailpiece of an electric guitar using a controlling lever, which is alternatively referred to as a whammy bar, vibrato bar, or tremolo arm. The lever enables the player to quickly and temporarily vary the tension and sometimes length of the strings, changing the pitch to create a vibrato, portamento, or pitch bend effect. Instruments without a vibrato have other bridge and tailpiece systems.

The pitch-bending effects have become an important part of many styles, allowing creation of sounds that could not be played without the device, such as the 1980s-era shred guitar "dive bomb" effect.

The mechanical vibrato systems began as a device for more easily producing the vibrato effects that blues and jazz guitarists had achieved on arch top guitars by manipulating the tailpiece with their picking hand. Guitar makers have developed a variety of vibrato systems since the 1890s.

A vibrato-equipped guitar is typically more difficult to re-string and tune than a fixed-tailpiece guitar.

Since the regular appearance of mechanical vibrato systems in the 1950s, many guitarists have used them—from Chet Atkins to Duane Eddy and the surf music of The Ventures, The Shadows, and Dick Dale. In the 1960s and 1970s, Jimi Hendrix, Jeff Beck, David Gilmour, Ritchie Blackmore, Jimmy Page, and Frank Zappa used vibrato arms for more pronounced effects. In the 1980s, shred guitarists Eddie Van Halen, Eric Johnson, Joe Satriani and Steve Vai, and metal guitarists Kerry King, Ritchie Blackmore, Kirk Hammett, Terje Rypdal, Vernon Reid, David Torn and David Duhig used vibrato in a range of metal-influenced styles, many aided by the development of the double-locking design pioneered by Floyd Rose or the later Kahler, which eliminated many of the tuning issues associated with more basic designs and allowed guitarists to employ dramatic "dive bomb" effects freely throughout a performance.

Dive bomb effect
Dive bomb effect, a typical deep bend using whammy bar; followed by string noise.

Clean Bigsby
Clear bend sound using Bigsby Vibrato Tailpiece.

melody with the whammy bar
Melody with distortion and delay, played with the whammy bar.

== Origin of names ==
Though a guitar's "tremolo arm" can produce variations of pitch, including vibrato, it cannot produce tremolo (rapid modulation of volume). However it has become common practice for electric guitarists and manufacturers to use the terms vibrato and tremolo the other way round when referring to hardware devices and the effects they produce. This reversal of terminology is generally attributed to Leo Fender and the naming of his 1954 Stratocaster mechanical vibrato system as a "Tremolo Device for Stringed Instruments". Additionally, the 1956 Fender "Vibrolux" guitar amplifier, used electronically generated tremolo that Fender called "vibrato". Other classic guitar amplifiers contain electronic "vibrato units" that produce a tremolo effect via a tremolo circuit.

Doc Kauffman's patent application for his "Vibrola" device (see below) spoke of "producing tremolo effects" in 1928.

Other widely used names for the device include "vibrato bar" and "whammy bar", the latter attributed to guitarist Lonnie Mack's aggressive, rapid manipulation of the pitch-bending device in his 1963 song "Wham!" It has also been called a "whang bar".

== Designs ==
Most vibrato systems for guitar are based on one of four basic designs:

1. Bigsby Vibrato Tailpiece, introduced in the late 1940s and used in close to original form on many guitars (including Gibson, Gretsch and Rickenbacker guitars)
2. Fender Synchronized Tremolo or strat trem, introduced on the Fender Stratocaster (1954), which inspired many designs, including:
  - Floyd Rose locking tremolo (developed late 1970s)
  - G&L Dual-fulcrum Vibrato, designed by Leo Fender (1981)
  - Fender two-point synchronized tremolo (1986)
3. Fender Floating Bridge, which has two main variants:
  - Fender Floating Tremolo or jag trem, introduced on the Fender Jazzmaster (1958)
  - Fender Dynamic Vibrato or stang trem, introduced on the Fender Mustang (1964)
4. Cam-driven designs based on pedal steel guitar concepts, include:
  - Kahler Tremolo System (1979)
  - Washburn Wonderbar (1980s)
  - Stetsbar tremolo (developed late 1980s)

Many other designs exist in smaller numbers, notably several original designs marketed by Gibson under the Vibrola name, which they also used for some licensed Bigsby units.

In 2015 the FOMOfx company released a "Digital Whammy Bar System" called Virtual Jeff with a control lever mounted on the body of the guitar. The design won awards in Australia and the USA. An updated model, the Virtual Jeff Pro, was released in 2022.

== Kauffman Vibrola ==
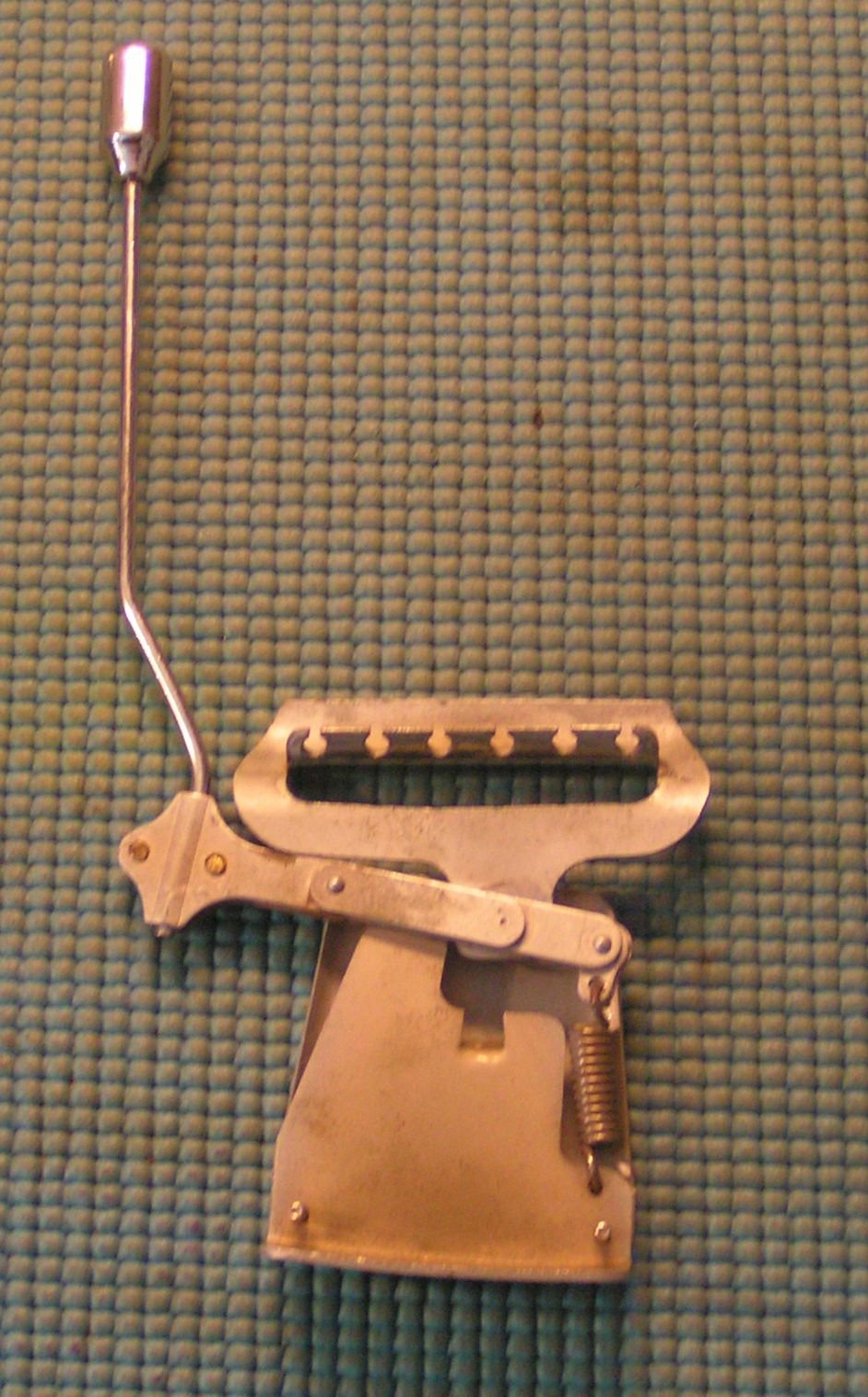
Kauffman Vibrola rear - note spring mechanism

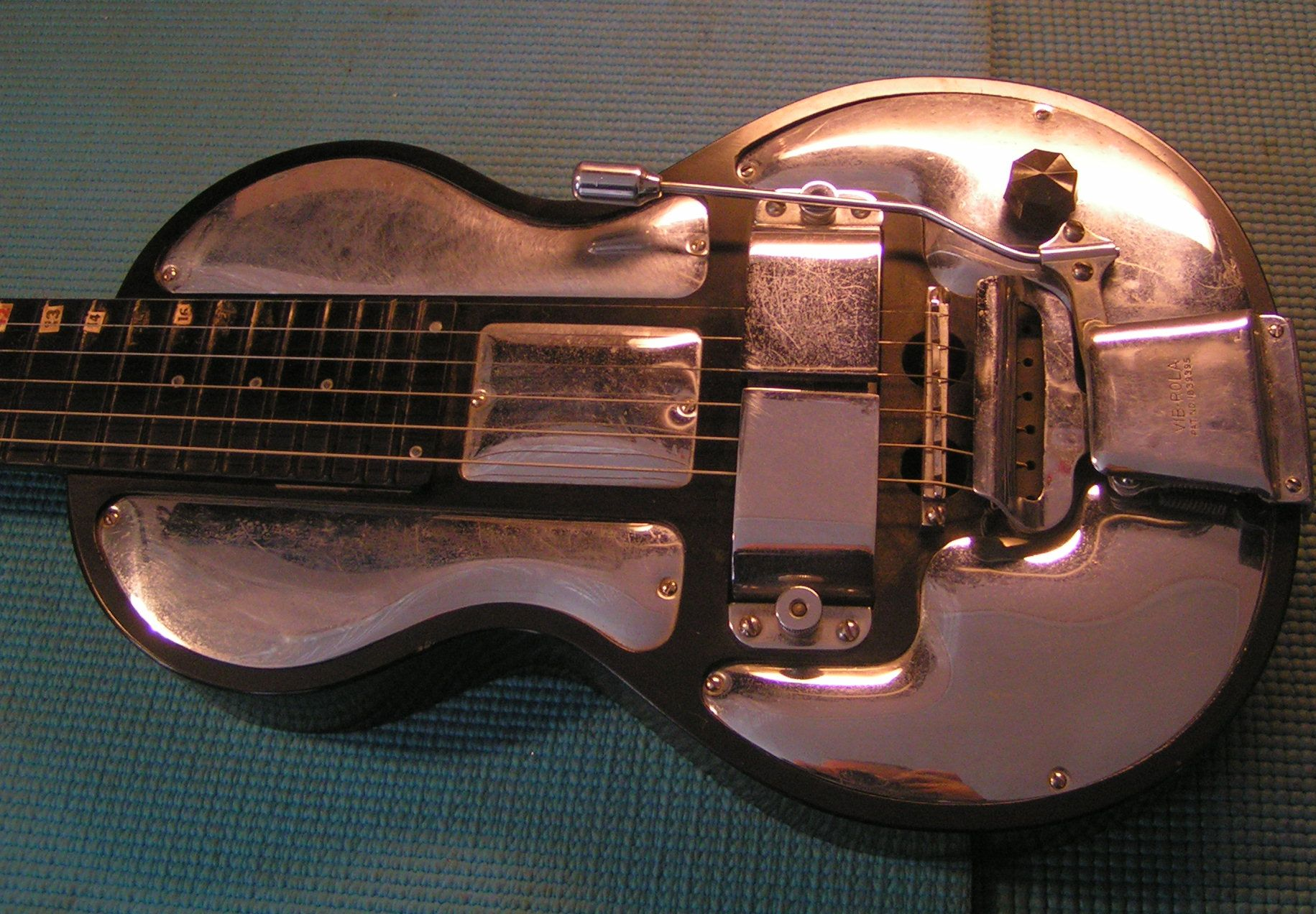
Kauffman Vibrola on Rickenbacker Electro Spanish

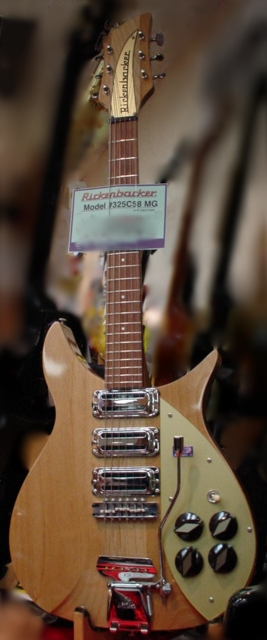
Kauffman Vibrola on Rickenbacker 325

The world's first patented mechanical vibrato unit was created and designed by Doc Kauffman. The initial patent was filed in August 1929 and was officially published in 1932 under the title, Apparatus for producing tremolo effects. Between 1920 and 1980 Kauffman collaborated with many pioneering guitar manufacturers including Rickenbacker, Gibson and Fender. In the late 1930s Rickenbacker produced the first commercial batch of electric Spanish guitars, utilizing the Kauffman "Vib-rol-a" as a stock option, thus setting precedence for electric guitars produced by Fender and Gibson.

The Epiphone guitar company first offered the Vibrola as an option on some archtop guitars from 1935 to 1937. Epiphone sold the Vibrola as an aftermarket option as well. This Vibrola was also used on some Rickenbacker lap steel guitars at around the same time and was introduced on their six string 'Electro Spanish' guitars beginning about 1937.

Some early Vibrolas on Rickenbacker guitars were not operated by hand, but rather moved with an electrical mechanism developed by Doc Kauffman to simulate the pitch manipulation available with steel guitars. The Vibrola distributed as an option with Rickenbacker Electro Spanish guitars was hand operated like the earliest Epiphone Vibrolas. A later unit was created and used on Rickenbacker's Capri line of guitars in the 1950s, such as John Lennon's 1958 Rickenbacker 325. It was a side-to-side action vibrato unit (rather than the up-down action of later units) that was notorious for throwing the guitar out of tune, hence Lennon's replacing his with a Bigsby B5 unit (Lennon's 1964 Rickenbacker 325 came fitted with a Rickenbacker Ac'cent vibrato unit).

== Bigsby ==
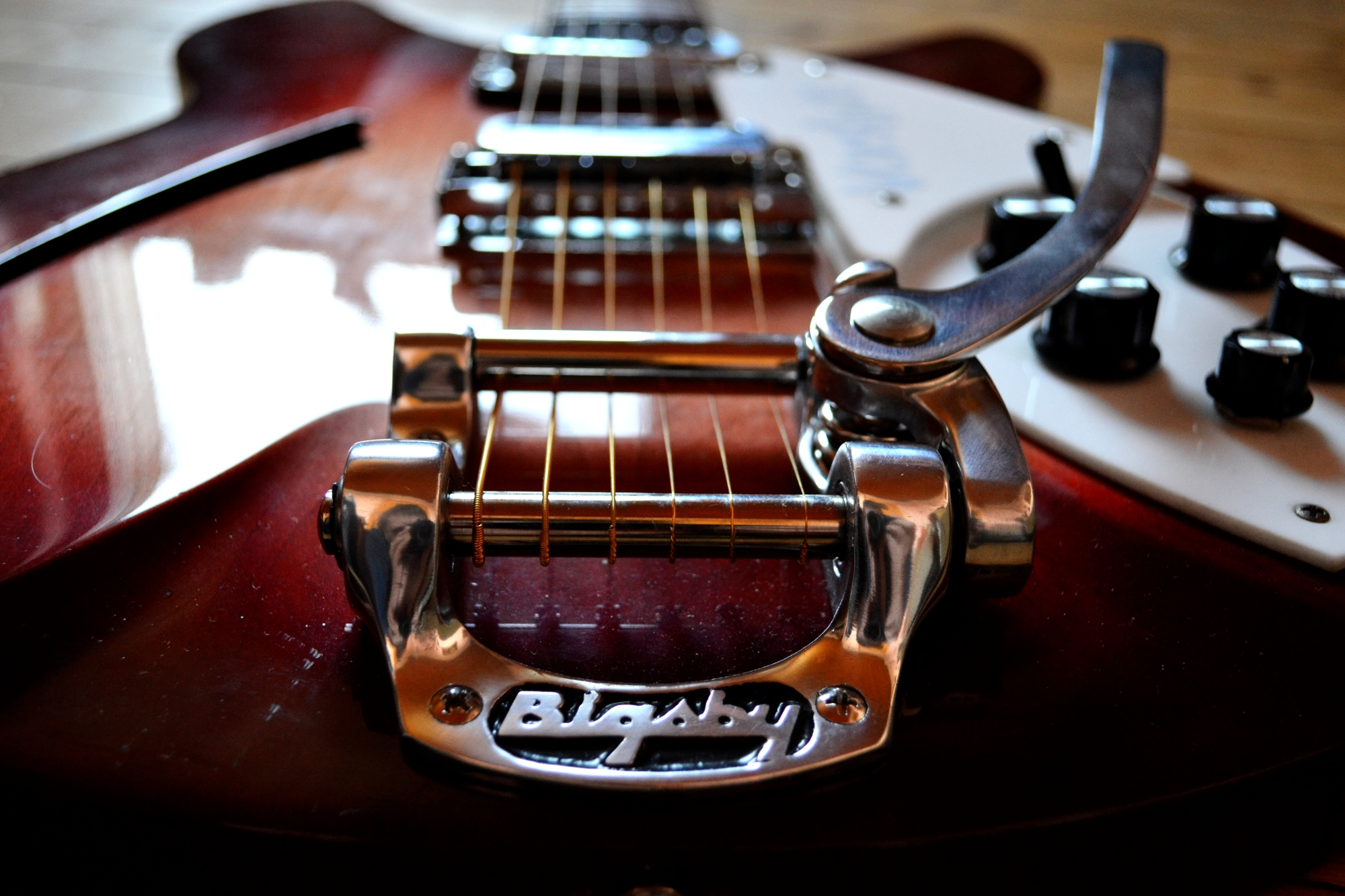
Bigsby on Rickenbacker 330

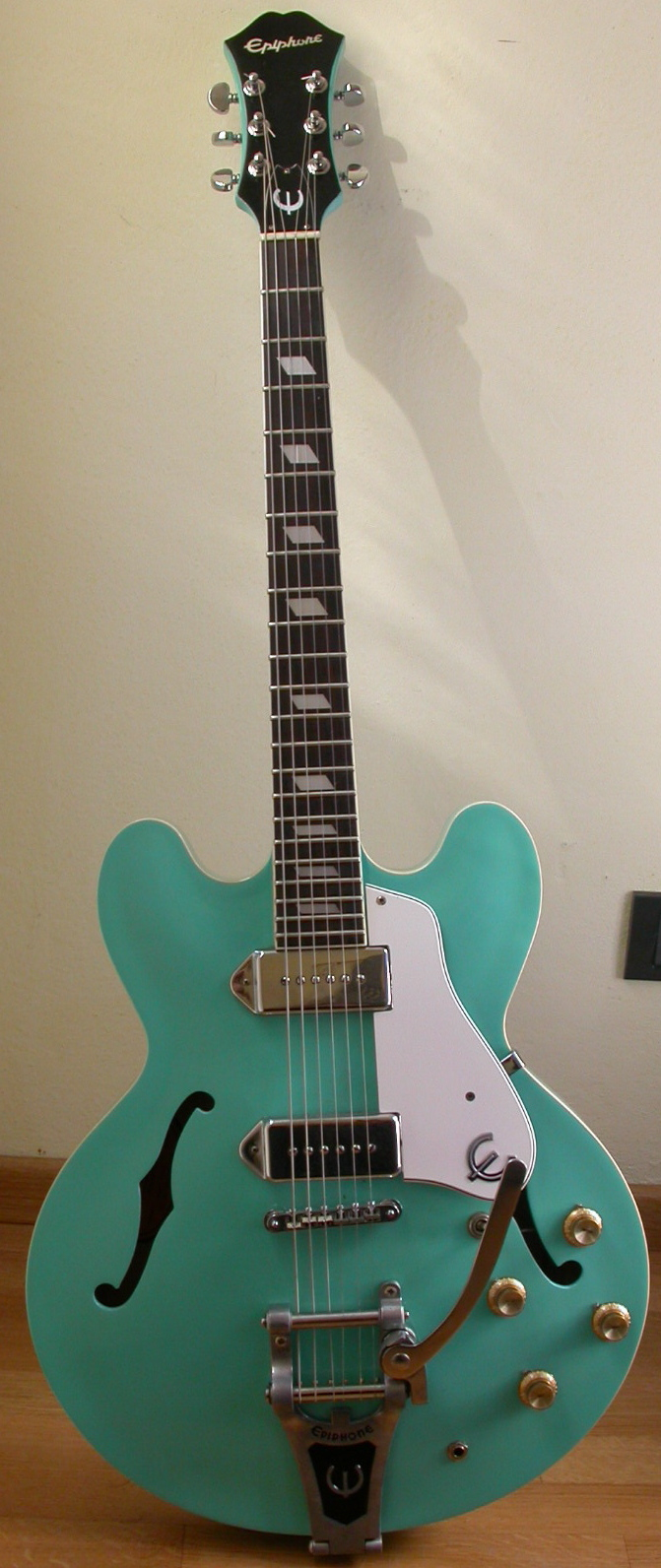
Bigsby on Epiphone Casino VT

The first commercially successful vibrato system for guitar was the Bigsby vibrato tailpiece, often just called a Bigsby, invented by Paul Bigsby (US Patent D169120 filed in 1952, issued in 1953). The exact date of its first availability is uncertain, as Bigsby kept few records, but it was on Bigsby-built guitars photographed in 1952, in what became its standard form.

In several interviews, the late Merle Travis, for whom Bigsby designed his first vibrato, recalled the prototype as being built for him in the "late '40s". The design uses a spring-loaded arm that rotates a cylindrical bar in the tailpiece, varying the string tension to create vibrato and other pitch variations. The string tension is balanced against a single, short helical compression spring, positioned under the arm pivot.

Blues-rock guitar pioneer Lonnie Mack, who considered Travis one of his three most significant guitar inspirations, was known for using a Bigsby on his 1958 Gibson Flying V electric guitar.

The Bigsby remains popular, especially on hollow-body guitars. It's available as a factory-fitted option on top-line models both hollow and solid-bodied from many makers, and as an aftermarket addition. It remains the only widely used design whose mechanism is entirely above the belly of the guitar body, making it particularly suitable for acoustic and semi-acoustic guitars.

== Fender designs ==
=== Fender "synchronized tremolo" ===
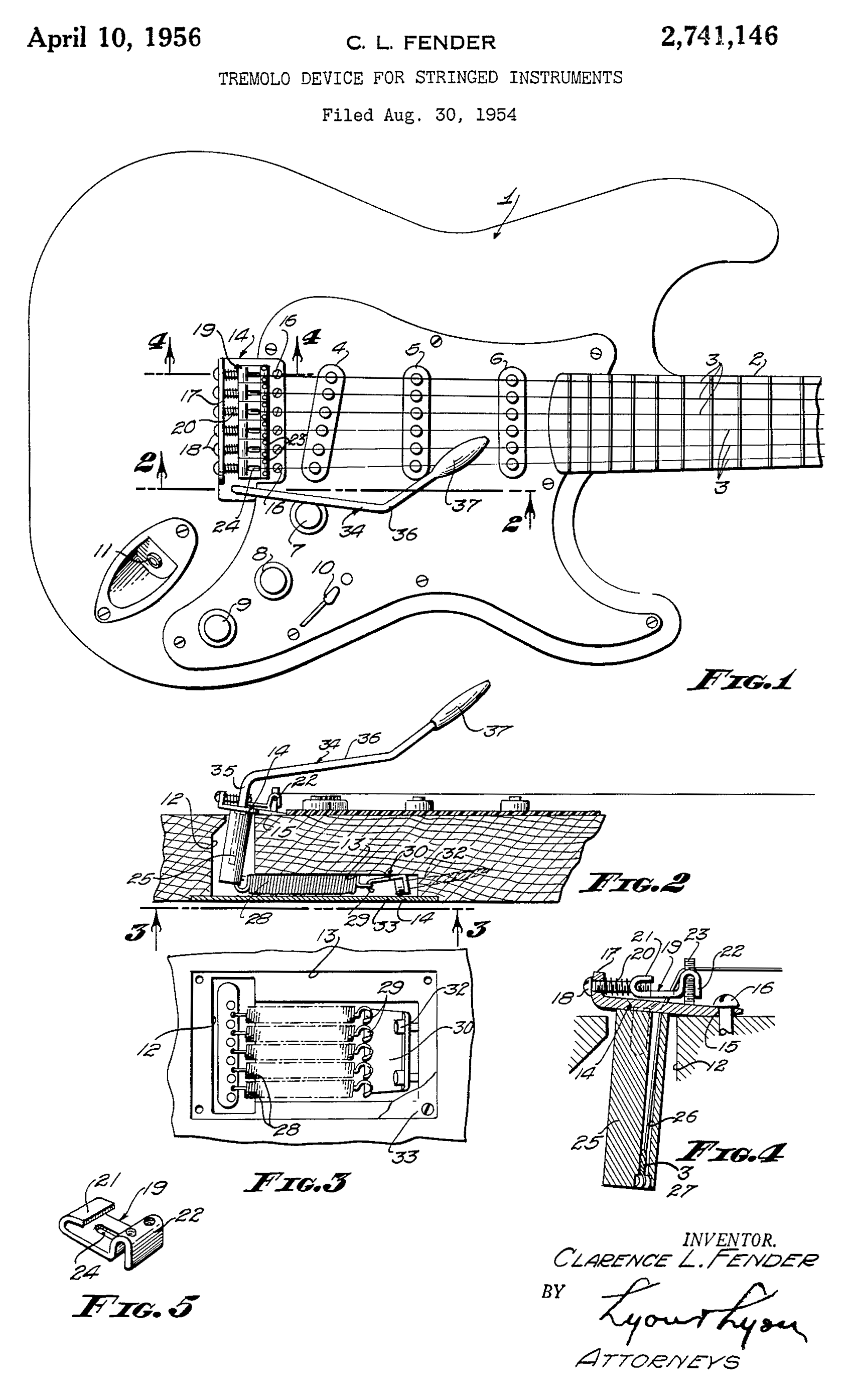
Sketch of Fender synchronized tremolo from 1954 patent application

After the Bigsby, the next major development was Leo Fender's synchronized tremolo, the device that introduced the term tremolo arm (U.S. patent 2,741,146 filed in 1954, issued in 1956). First released in 1954 on Fender's Stratocaster, the simple but effective design offers a greater range of pitch change than the Bigsby, and a better capability for up-bends. Fender incorrectly labeled the arm as a "tremolo arm" rather than a "vibrato arm", conversely referring to the tremolo circuit on his amplifiers as "vibrato".

Vibrato systems send a guitar out of tune when friction inhibits the vibrating length of string from returning to its original tension after a pitch bend. Fender's design is 'synchronized' in the way that the bridge saddles and string ends move together as one rigid unit, mostly eliminating sliding between string and saddle.

The unit attaches to the guitar's body with six steel wood screws. So the bridge can pivot smoothly about the screws, the upper portion of each one is unthreaded, they are not tightened all the way, and they pass through slightly oversized holes in the plate at the center of the design.

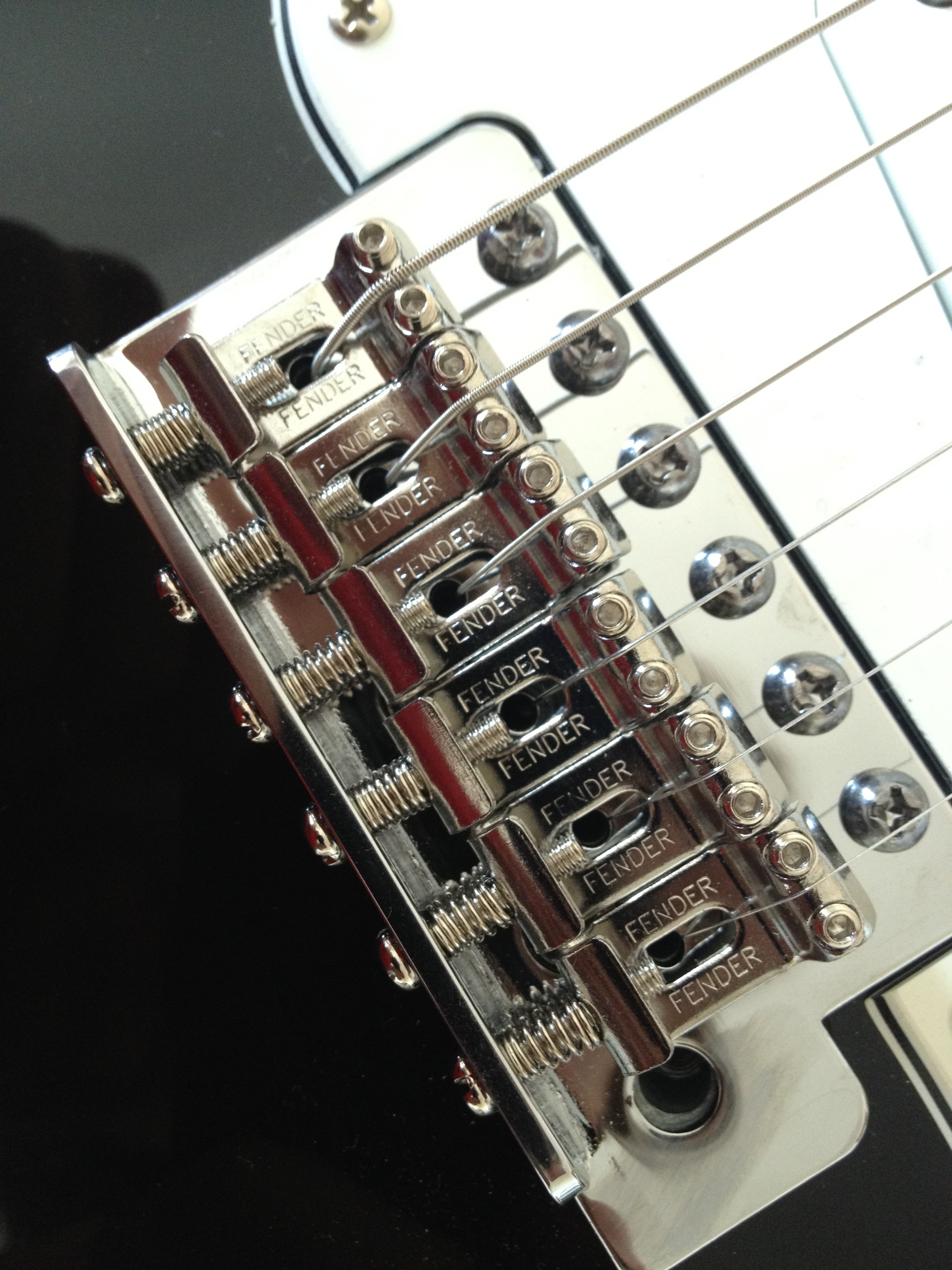
Bridge of synchronized tremolo

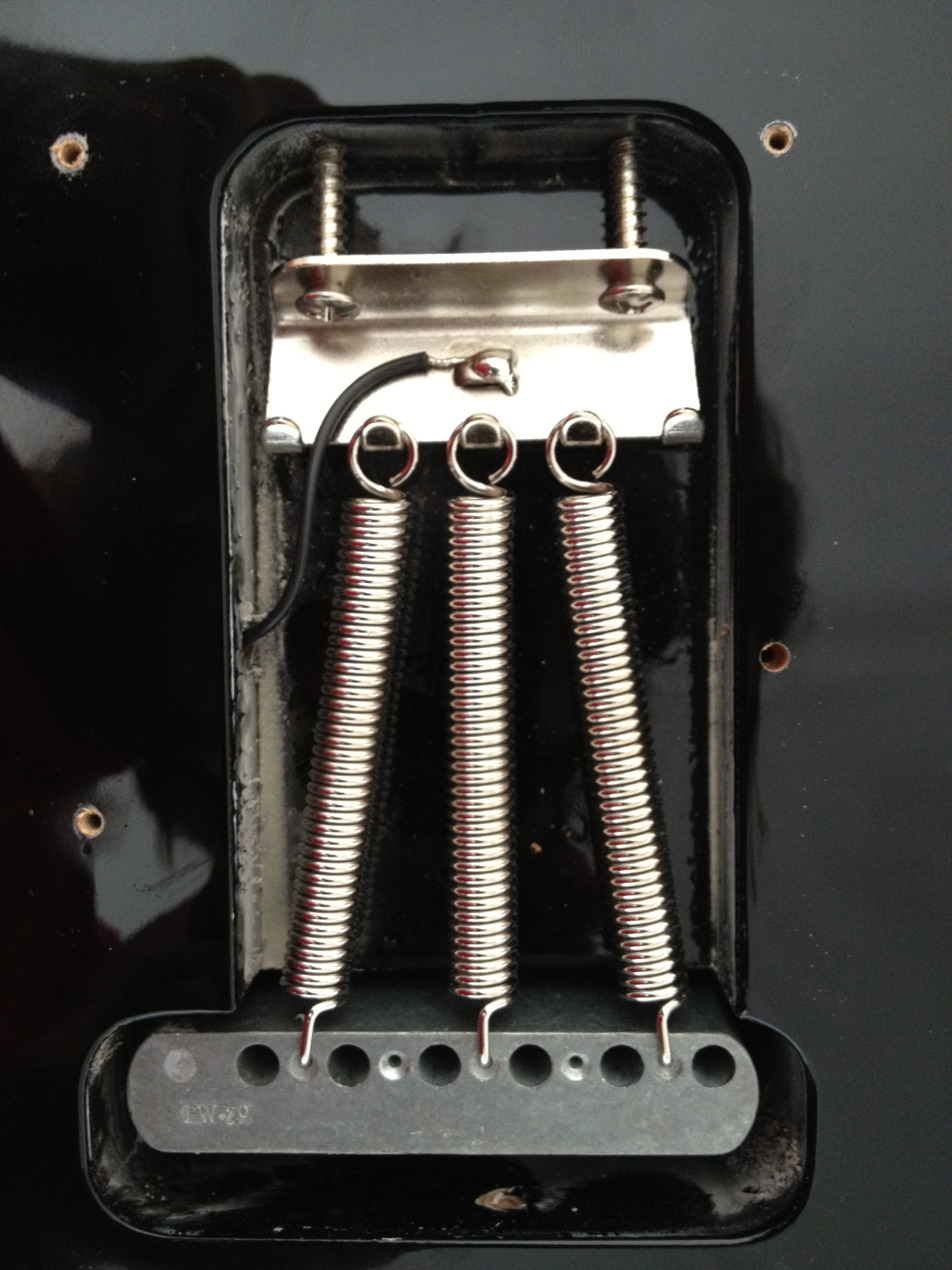
Rear view of synchronized tremolo. Note that there is provision for up to five springs. Only three are fitted here to allow for use of light strings, there being no other adjustment.

Six bridge saddles are held against this plate by string tension, individually adjustable both for height and intonation. Another of the components which make up the tailpiece consists of a solid block of metal, commonly made of zinc, but aftermarket products can be made out of materials such as titanium or brass (often like the saddles). The different compositions, as well as its mass, helps to determine the quality of the sound of the guitar. The block is secured to the base plate by three machine screws and resides in a cavity routed all the way through the guitar's body. In this cavity, up to five coil springs tether the end of the bridge block to the body, counteracting the pull of the strings, should this be the setup choice for the guitarist. There can even be differing sizes of tremolo arms in thickness depending on the date and country of manufacture.

The number and length of springs may be adjusted to set the neutral position of the bridge, determining the range of upward and downward pitch bending available. A bridge set to 'float' off the guitar lets the guitarist raise the pitch until the bridge presses against the body. Pitch bends are accomplished by pulling up or down on an arm screwed into the tailpiece block, usually free to swing.

The Fender synchronized tremolo is the most widely copied vibrato system. The original design is still in production virtually unchanged today.

The synchronized tremolo may have been the reason for the popularity of the Stratocaster among rock musicians in the late '60s and '70s. Owing to its superiority in aggressive use, all Fender guitars using any other vibrato system other than the synchronized tremolo were for a time withdrawn, to return to the catalog as classic or retro models in the '90s.

==== Fender two-point "synchronized tremolo" ====
Later models are pivoted about two specially shaped studs rather than a row of six screws. This development sacrifices economical manufacture for decreased friction at the pivot point.

The Fender two-point system is their standard and most popular design.

Featuring stainless steel block saddles since its introduction in 1986, the Fender two-point system has been redesigned with new vintage-style bent sheet steel saddles as of 2008. The Fender two-point system is available with two types of "tremolo bars": traditional "screw-in" type with a plastic tip at the end and deluxe "pop-in" type without the plastic tip.

Not to be confused with the similarly named Floyd Rose two-point locking tremolo, the two systems use the words two-point to describe entirely different concepts.

=== Fender floating bridge ===
The floating bridge featured on two Fender "tremolo arm" designs, both developed by Leo Fender subsequently to the original synchronized tremolo but overshadowed by it. Despite its not being the most popular bridge, there are benefits unique to guitars with this type of bridge (See 3rd bridge guitars).

==== Floating tremolo ====
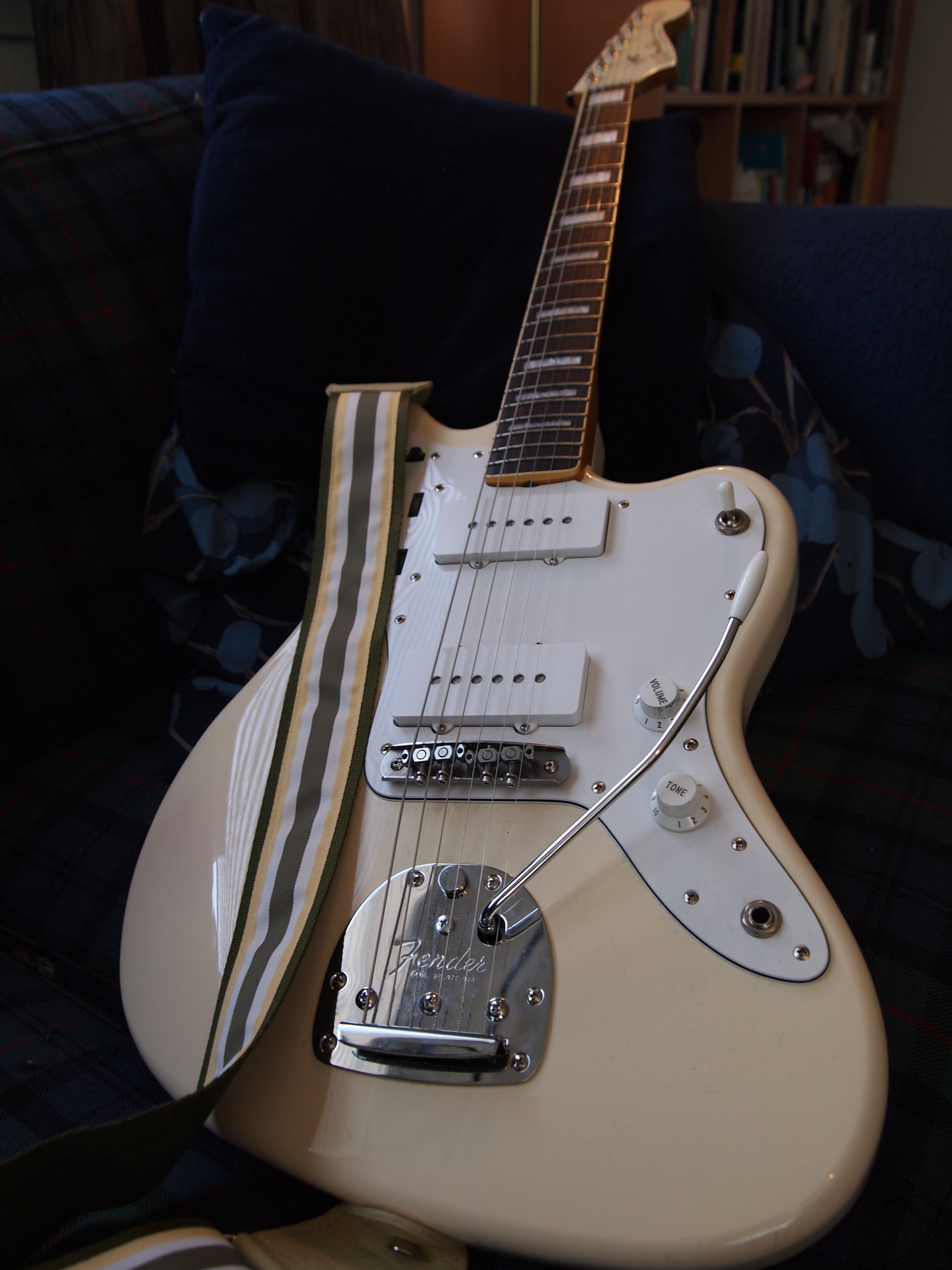
Fender floating tremolo on a Jazzmaster

The floating tremolo was designed by Fender for the Fender Jazzmaster, and first appeared with the release of the Jazzmaster in 1958. A larger, heavier and more complex vibrato mechanism than the synchronized tremolo and promoted over it by Fender as their premium "tremolo arm" mechanism, it never achieved the same popularity, though if properly set up according to Fender's recommendations, it held tune as well as or better than the synchronized tremolo unit. A major cause of the floating tremolo's increasingly poor reputation since its introduction is the far-increased availability and popularity of lighter guitar strings, which do not produce enough tension in standard tuning to compensate for the low break-angle over the bridge and, in the Jaguar's case, the exceptionally short scale length of 24 inches. This places relatively little downwards force on the bridge, making it unreliable in returning to the correct position after tremolo operation.

The main difference is that, while much of the mechanism of the synchronized tremolo including the springs is accessed by removing a rectangular plate in the back of the guitar body, and is mounted on the guitar body in a routed bay extending behind the pickups, the entire mechanism of the floating tremolo is mounted on a roughly triangular chromed plate in the front of the guitar body, on the opposite side of the bridge to the pickups. The string tension is balanced against a single short helical spring, in compression rather than tension, mounted on the back of the "tremolo mounting plate". The spring is adjustable by turning a screw located towards the center of this plate.

The ferrule ends of the strings are held on the top of the guitar in a tailpiece plate called the knife plate, which emerges from the mechanism, rather than the strings vanishing into the mechanism as with the synchronized tremolo. It is the knife plate that is moved when the tremolo arm is operated. Unlike the synchronized tremolo, the bridge is not moved directly by the mechanism, but only by the movement of the strings, and is allowed to tilt to accommodate this movement. This is called a floating bridge.

The Fender floating tremolo also features a knob that enables the player to lock, and thus disable, the tremolo mechanism. This facilitates quick retuning in the event of a string breaking and strives to provide tuning stability similar to a fixed bridge guitar. In practice, the lock doesn't generally achieve as much stability as a fixed bridge, leading some players to replace the mechanism with a fixed bridge and tailpiece. The "floating tremolo" was greatly favored by some surf music bands, particularly for its ability to produce a pronounced and distinctive vibrato on a sustained chord without disturbing the tuning of the guitar. To fully achieve this benefit however, correct setup, as per Fender's recommendations, was essential.

In addition to the Jazzmaster, Fender used the floating tremolo on the then top-of-the-line Fender Jaguars, released in 1962, and also on the Fender Bass VI, released in 1961. Jaguar and Jazzmasters share the same bridge plate and string saddles, though Jaguar bridges (and the earliest Jazzmaster bridges) have taller legs. The two are functionally interchangeable and replacement parts for each are identical. The Bass VI bridge has a wider plate and longer intonation screws to accommodate bass string intonation, and the saddles have threads cut for larger diameter strings. There have also been a small number of not very notable imitations by other makers, generally without the locking knob. Fender discontinued all floating tremolo models by 1980, but reintroduced both the Jazzmaster and Jaguar first as Japanese models in the mid 1980s, then as American-made reissues in the 1990s. The tremolo-equipped Bass VI was reintroduced as a US Custom Shop model in 2006.

An advantage or disadvantage, depending on taste, is string resonance audible at several fret positions where a simple relation exists between the length to the fret and the string length behind the bridge (for instance 48:12 = 4:1). At those positions, a high overtone rises in volume. This becomes clearer with an over-driven guitar sound. The overtone might sound odd, but it still has a harmonic relation to the note, so is not out of tune related to the open string. For staccato playing, it can be annoying. Muting the strings behind the bridge with felt or other material solves the issue.

==== Dynamic Vibrato ====
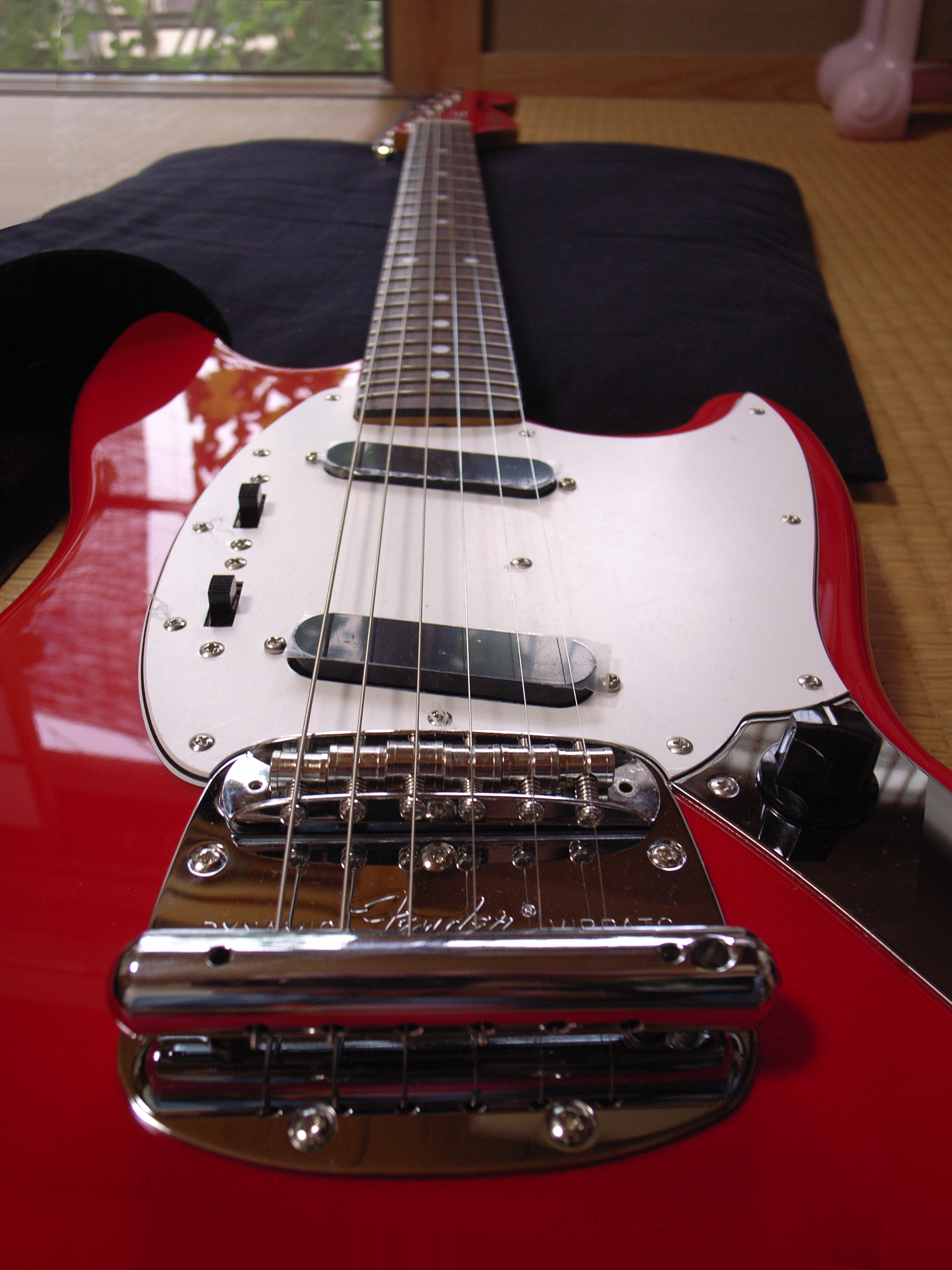
Fender dynamic vibrato on Mustang

The Fender Dynamic Vibrato (also colloquially referred to as the Mustang tremolo or Stang trem) was introduced in 1964 on the Fender Mustang, intended as a student model. It was also notably used on the Jag-Stang, a custom design by Nirvana frontman Kurt Cobain combining features of the Jaguar and the Mustang. Some late 1960s Mustangs were fitted instead with the floating tremolo, which was promoted by Fender as their premium unit, but later Mustangs returned to the Dynamic Vibrato.

The Dynamic Vibrato is still preferred by some lead guitarists above all other designs. It features a floating bridge similar to that of the floating tremolo, but the bridge is integral with the vibrato unit, unlike that of the floating tremolo, which is mounted separately. The strings are controlled by a tailpiece bar to which the vibrato arm is visibly connected, similar to the Bigsby, and the mechanism is installed from the top of the instrument, similar to the floating tremolo. It combines some features of all three basic designs.

The Dynamic Vibrato is often confused with the Fender floating tremolo, which it resembles. The original production runs of the two overlap by more than a decade, but the mechanisms are quite different. The existence of a few 1960s Mustangs factory fitted with the floating tremolo has probably added to the confusion. The concealed mechanism is in a chamber of a completely different shape and position, requiring an impractical amount of woodwork to convert from one to the other, and the mounting plate is of a different shape with different mounting holes.

The string tension is balanced against two medium length helical springs under tension, mounted on the underside of the tremolo mounting plate, one attached to each of the two feet of the tailpiece bar. Dynamic Vibrato units may be recognized by the integrated floating bridge and the stamps "Fender" and "DYNAMIC VIBRATO". Many but not all units also have the words "PAT PEND" or "PAT. NO. 3,241,418" stamped under the word "Fender". The Dynamic Vibrato was the last of the floating bridge designs Fender discontinued, with the Mustang in 1982—and the first they reintroduced, again with the Mustang, in 1990.

=== Other Fender designs ===
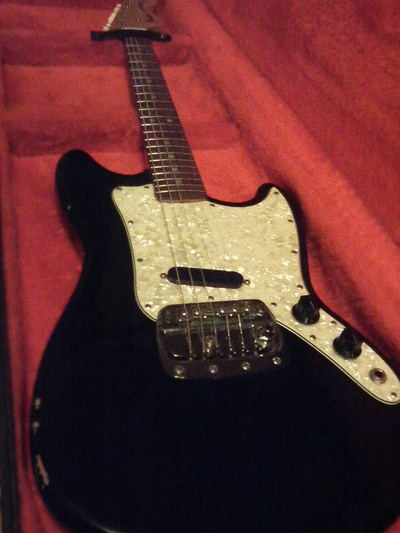
Fender Vibrato Tailpiece (or Fender Steel Vibrato) on Fender Bronco.

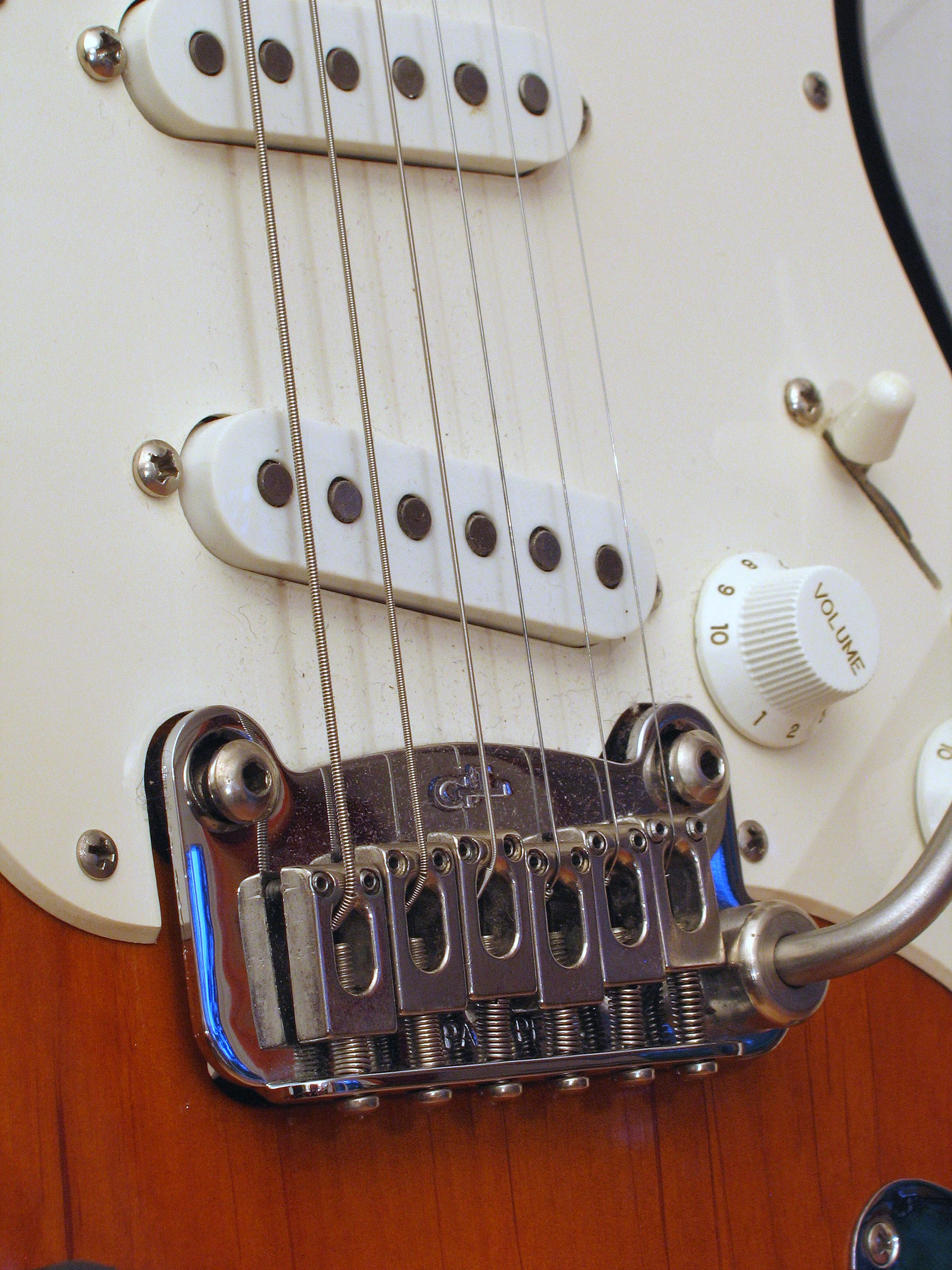
Dual-Fulcrum Vibrato on 1993 G&L Legacy.

Still another design appeared on the student model Fender Bronco, released mid-1967. This was simply known as the Fender vibrato tailpiece, or sometimes the Fender steel vibrato. It was again designed by Leo Fender although he had sold the company by the time it appeared. Basically, a synchronized tremolo simplified to reduce cost, it had little popularity, and as of 2005 was the only Leo Fender vibrato arm design not available on any current Fender model.

In 1981 G&L released the F-100 guitar with a dual-fulcrum vibrato designed by Leo Fender, one of G&L's owners.

== Gibson Vibrola ==
Variation of vibrato system by Gibson
Period	Name / nickname	Spec.
Earlier vibrato options
1950s	Gibson Vibra-Rest	adapter in guitar shape
1950s–	Licensed version of Bigsby vibrato tailpiece	
early 1960s	Maestro Vibrola or Epiphone Tremotone	roller bridge mechanism
Gibson Vibrola (Gibson Vibrola Tailpiece)
1962	Gibson vibrato: Sideways Vibrola; side-to-side vibrato	long tailpiece with folding arm
1962	ebony vibrato	short tailpiece with pearl inlay
1963	Deluxe Gibson Vibrato: Gibson Deluxe Vibrato	long tailpiece
1964–	Lyre Vibrola	long tailpiece with Lyre engrave
1967– present	Maestro Vibrola: Maestro	long and short

From the 1950s, Gibson offered either a guitar-shaped Gibson Vibra-Rest or a Bigsby vibrato tailpiece option.

Since the early 1960s, Gibson have marketed a number of vibrato system designs under the name "Vibrola".

Vibrola tailpieces include a licensed version of the Bigsby, earlier version of Maestro Vibrola (or Epiphone Tremotone) using roller bridge (U.S. patent 3,124,991 filed in 1961, issued in 1964), and several in-house Gibson designs. The Gibson designs did not have the impact of the Bigsby and Fender designs, and have inspired few if any copies, but they competed reasonably successfully and continue to sell.

Gibson designs tend to have the mechanism surface-mounted on the belly of guitar, similar to the Bigsby, and are therefore equally suitable for use on acoustic guitars and especially on archtops. This reflects the Gibson company's history as the developer of the archtop guitars, and their continued strength and focus on this market, but carries over even to the designs used only on solid body guitars, such as the Short Lyre Vibrola used on some Flying V and SG models. While these do require some woodwork for installation (primarily drilling), this is minimal in comparison to the routing required for the more common Fender synchronized, floating, and dynamic vibratos.

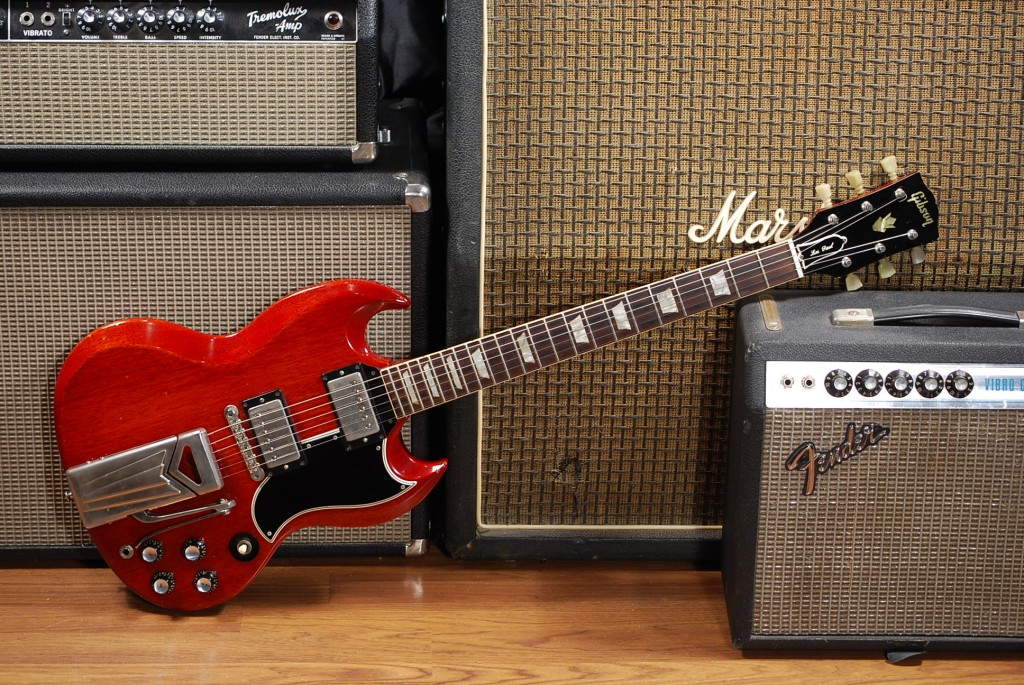
Gibson Vibrato (Sideways Vibrola) on 1962 Gibson Les Paul Standard (later SG)

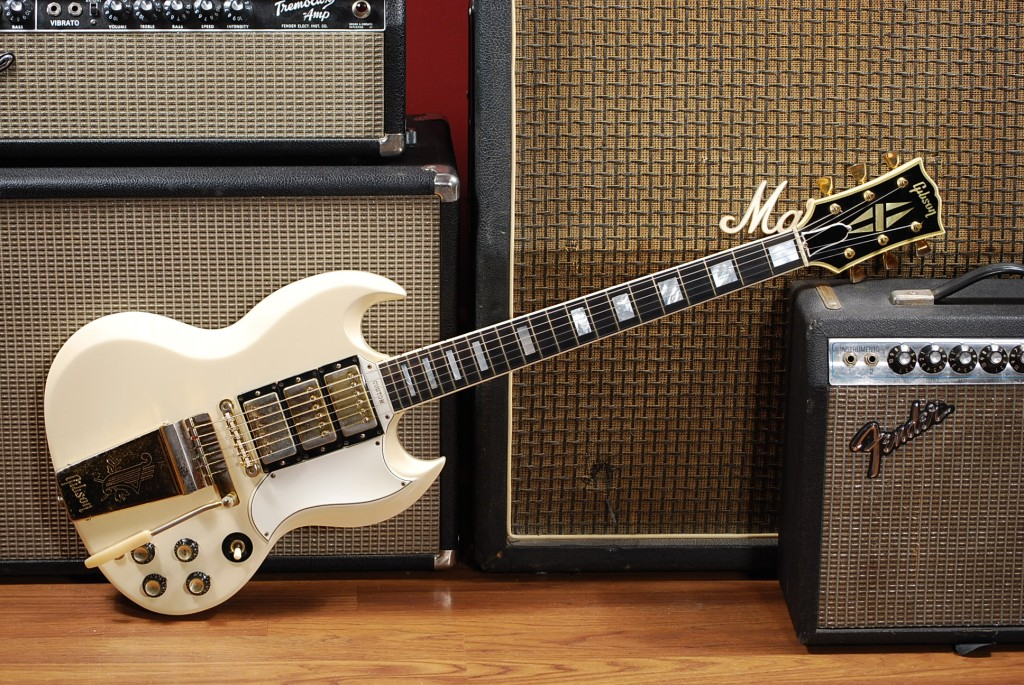
Gibson Deluxe Vibrola
(Lyre Vibrola, later Maestro Vibrola) on 1963 Gibson Les Paul SG Custom

The Gibson Vibrato, an earliest Gibson-designed vibrato systems, was a distinctive long tailpiece released in 1962 on some SG models. This mechanism later became known as the side-to-side vibrato (or Sideways Vibrola) because of the position of the lever, which emerged from the side of the long tailpiece. This lever had only restricted movement up and down in a plane close to that of the strings, so its action was unlike that of the Bigsby and Fender units, and remains unique. It was also described as the "Gibson Vibrola Tailpiece" in Gibson documents, but this name can be applied to any of the Gibson vibrato mechanisms. It was not a success and is of interest mainly to historians and collectors.
Also an earliest short vibrato, referred as "ebony vibrato with the inlaid pearl", was seen on the several Les Paul/SG Standard in the same year.

The Deluxe Gibson Vibrato (or Gibson Deluxe Vibrola, etc)—another long tailpiece mechanism, released in 1963—replaced the Gibson Vibrato. Its vibrato arm and all subsequent designs adopted the action popularized by Bigsby and Fender. Short version of Deluxe Gibson Vibrola was fitted as standard to the 1967 reissue Gibson Flying V. Also, there are two other names on the Deluxe Gibson Vibrato: "Lyre Vibrola" nicknamed after the lyre engraved on the cover plate, which was fitted to Gibson ES-335 series as an option by 1964; and "Maestro Vibrola" renamed for keeping Maestro brand, which was an option on the ES-335 by 1967.

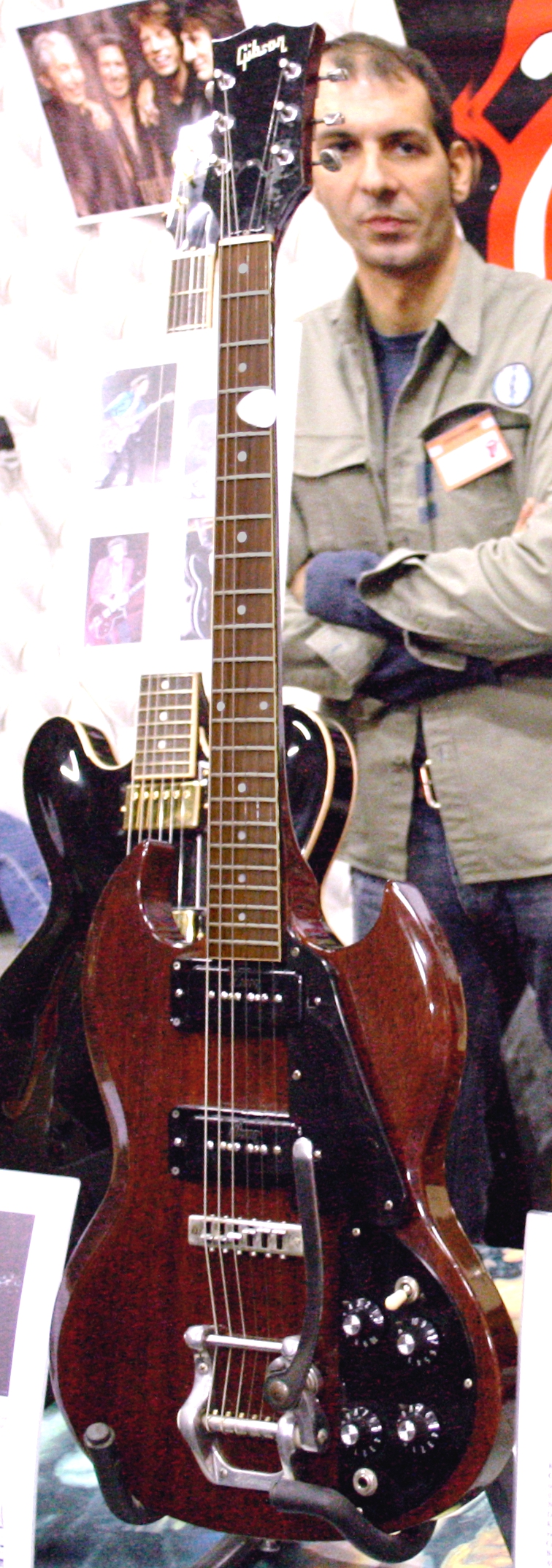
Bigsby on SG Pro

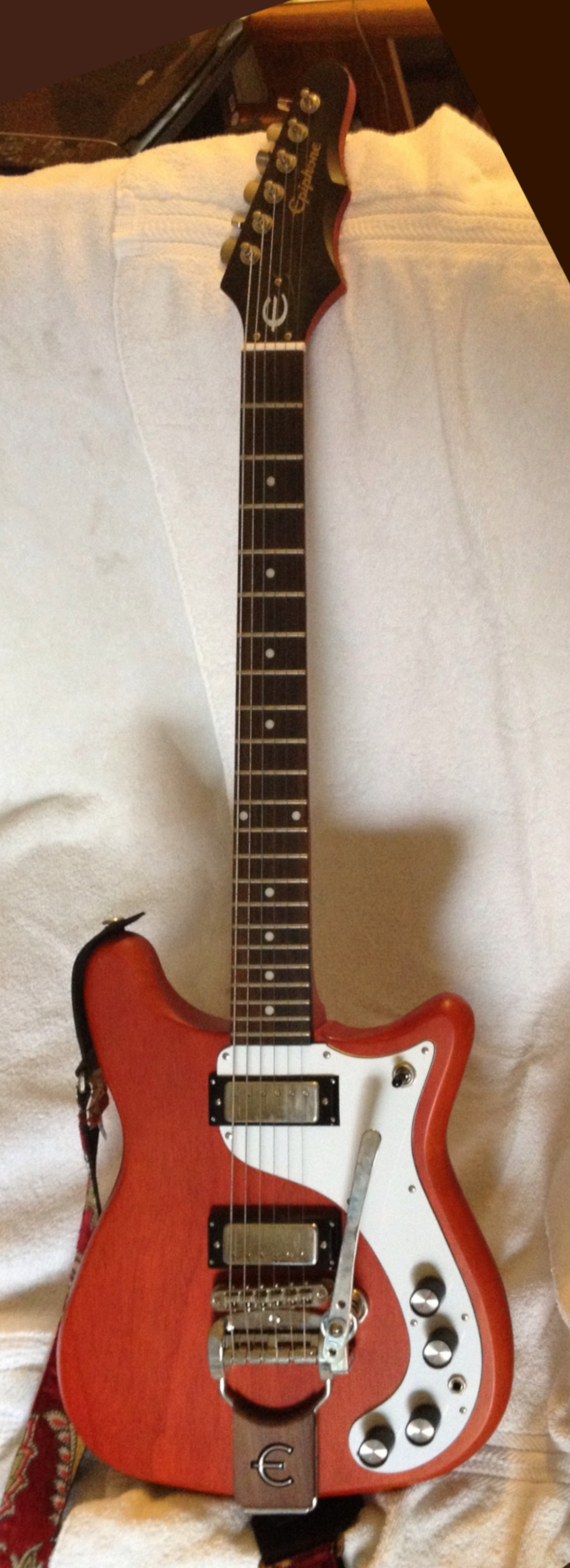
Epiphone Tremotone on Epiphone Wilshire

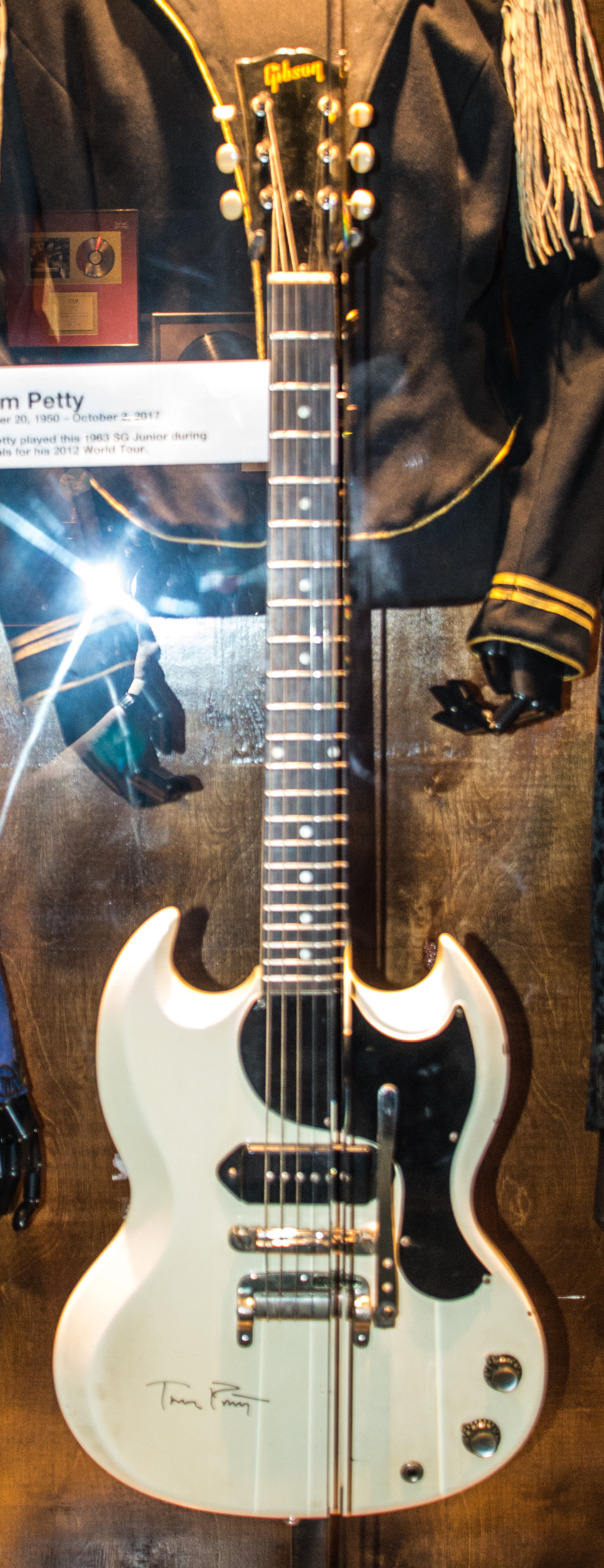
Maestro Vibrola (VMB-1-2) on Gibson SG Junior

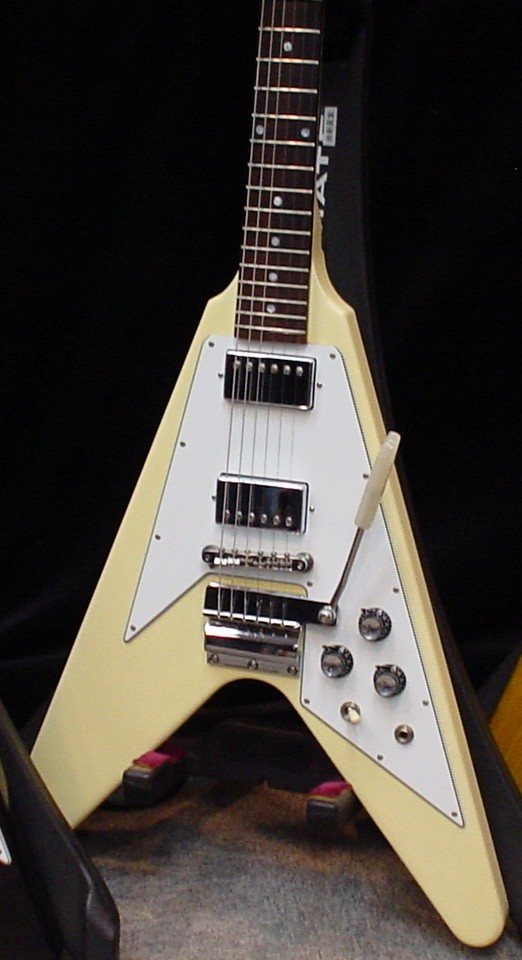
Short Vibrola on Flying V

Most Vibrola tailpieces, including the Bigsby, Lyre and Maestro, exist in both long and short versions. The long version replaces a trapeze-style tailpiece, such as found on most archtop guitars, and transmits the string tension to the guitar side. The short version replaces a string stop style tailpiece, such as found on the original Gibson Les Paul, and transmits the string tension to the guitar belly, so short versions are generally used only on solid body guitars. Long tailpieces can be used on almost any guitar (an exception being the Gibson Flying V where there is no room for one), and both long and short versions have been used on various models of Gibson SG and Gibson Les Paul guitars.

The Gibson designs were less suitable for the sounds that the Stratocaster tremolo and its derivatives made possible. They have almost always been offered as extra cost options on guitars that sold better in non-vibrato versions. As a result, some versions are rare and command high prices from restorers and collectors. Gibson encourages this trend by refusing to sell reissue units as parts, offering them only on complete guitars (a policy similar to most guitar manufacturers). As of 2006 Gibson was continuing to offer Vibrola units as options on many models, but also offered a few Fender-inspired tremolo arms such as the Floyd Rose on some Gibson branded guitars (Nighthawk, M3), and a wider variety through their Kramer and Epiphone brands. Kramer have always fitted Floyd Rose trems as standard and this association continues.

== Other designs ==
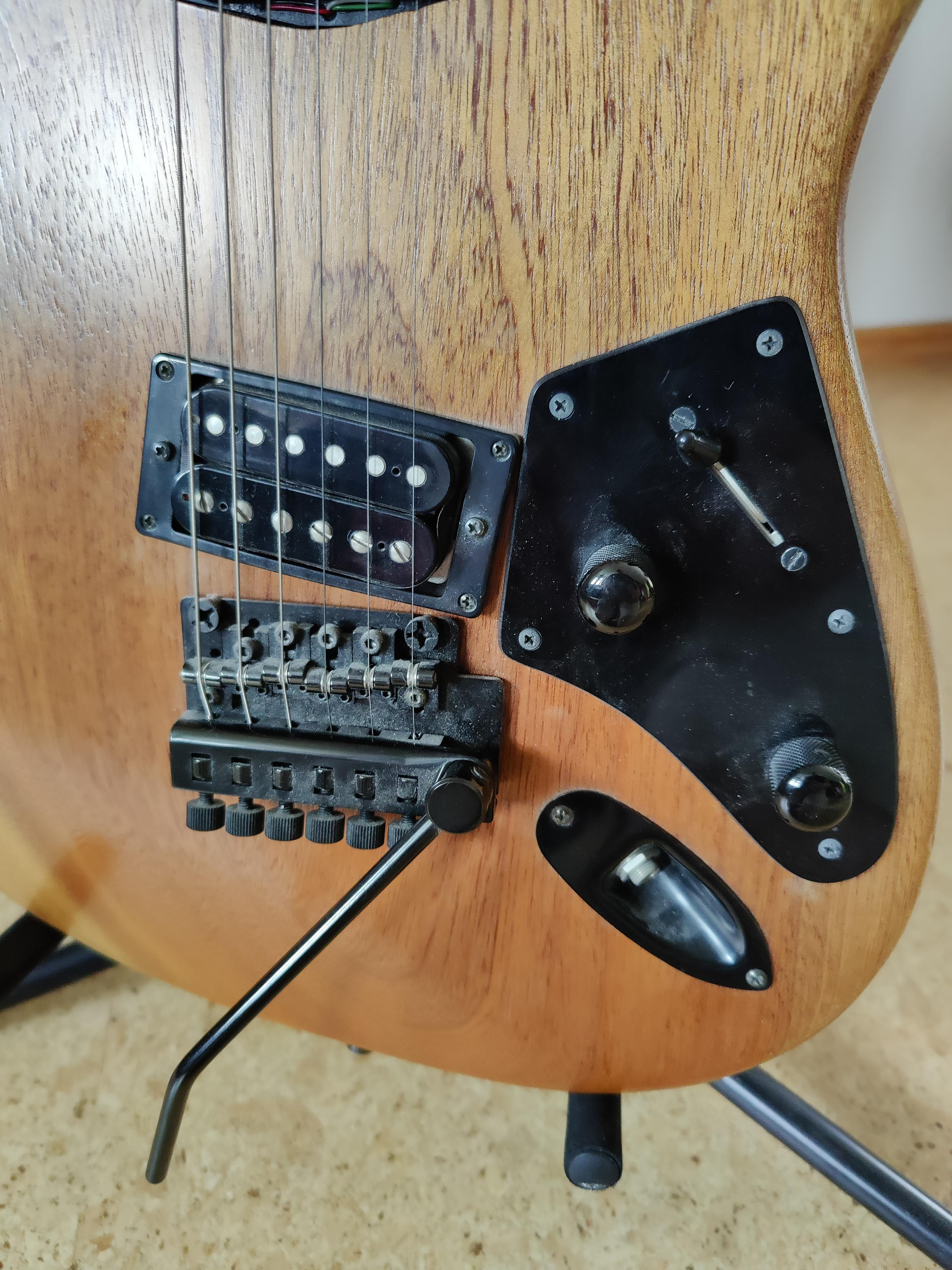
Rockinger tremolo system on Rockinger electric guitar

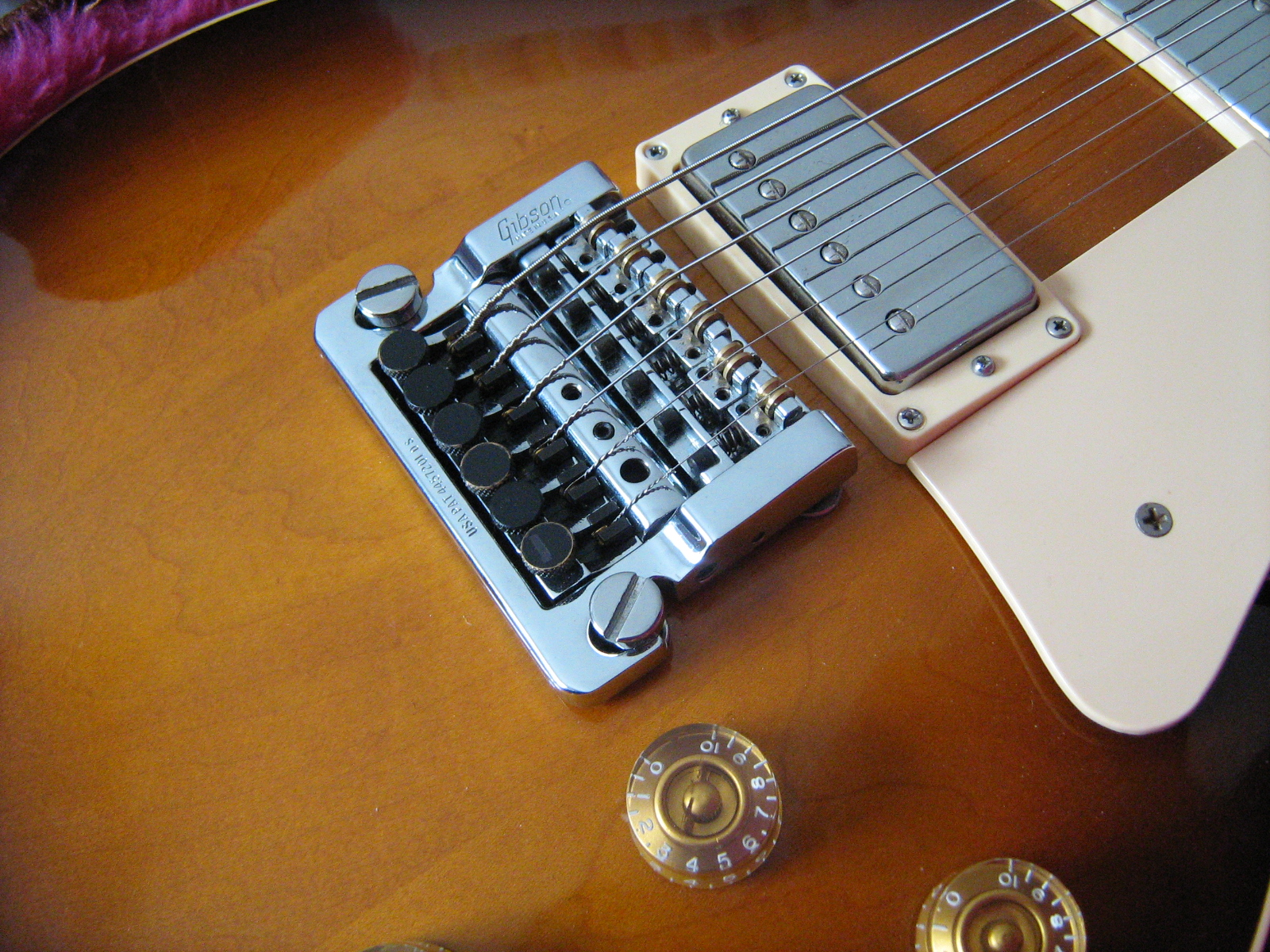
Kahler Tremolo System on Gibson Les Paul

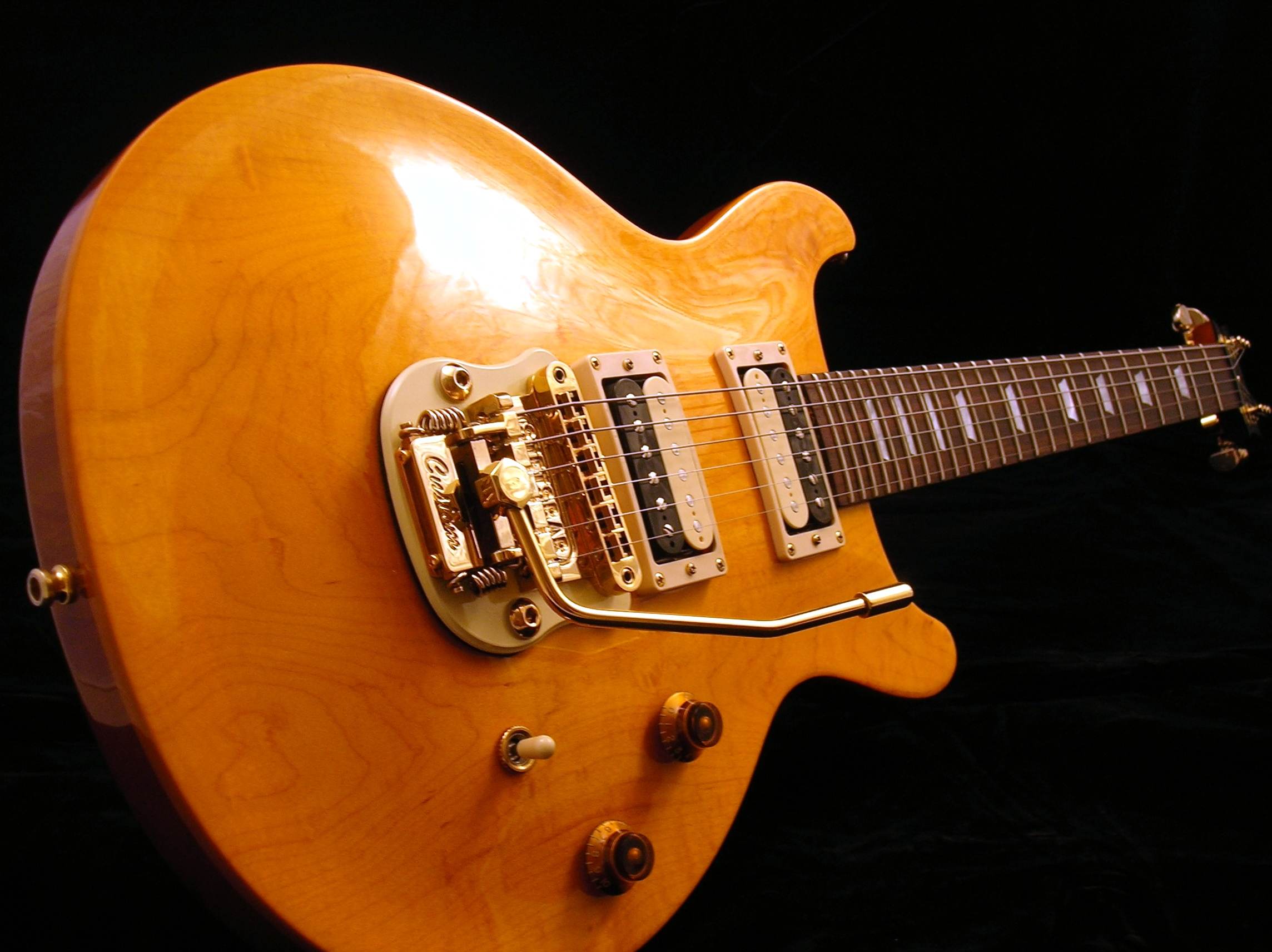
Stetsbar on Gibson Les Paul DC

Other notable vibrato designs include the Kahler, Washburn Wonderbar, Hagstrom Tremar, The Semie Moseley-designed Mosrite "Vibramute", the Stetsbar, the crossed-roller bearing linear tremolo and the early Rockinger from Germany. This last company was contracted by Kramer to develop a new fine-tuning tremolo with Edward Van Halen. The Rockinger designs proved problematic and Van Halen ultimately came to favor the Floyd Rose tremolo.

=== The Mosrite Vibrato ===
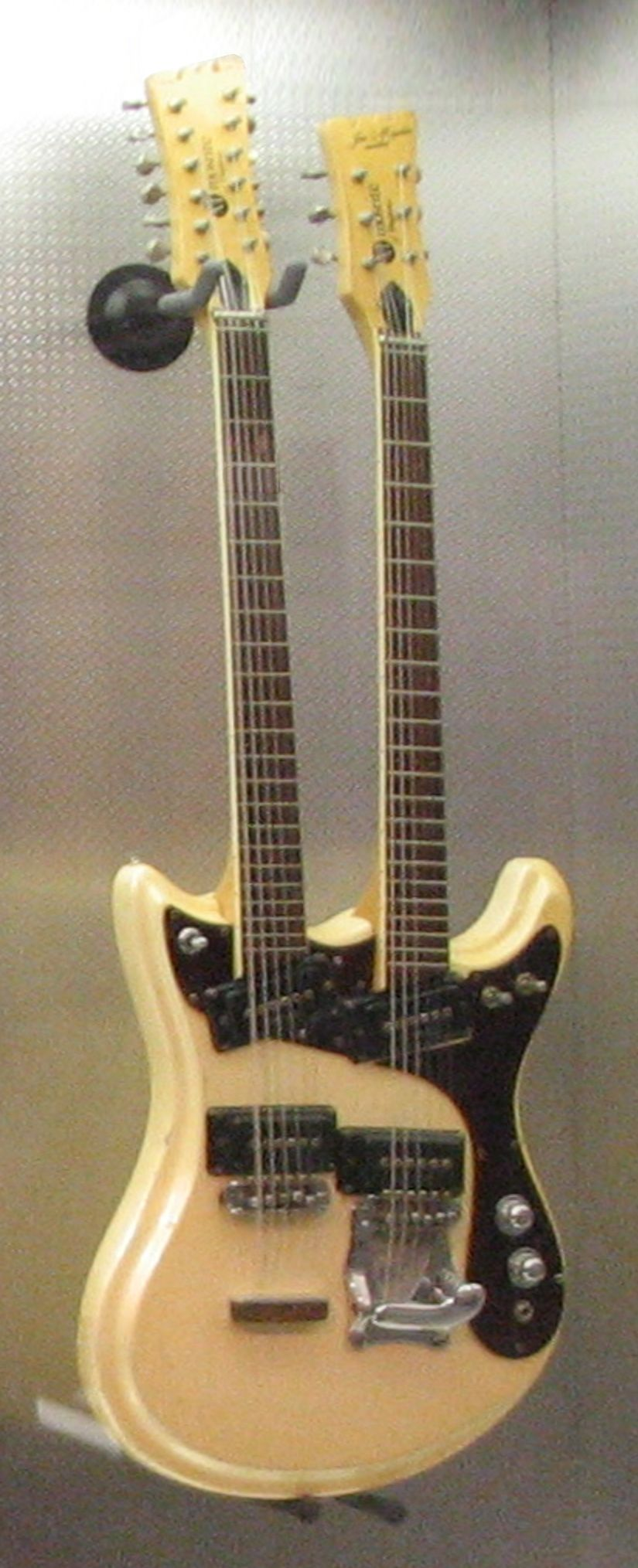
Mosrite Vibrato (6-string neck, right side in photo) on Joe Maphis model

Around 1962 Semie Moseley developed the vibrato unit used on his Mosrite guitars from the basic concept of the Bigsby vibrato, but with many engineering improvements. The entire vibrato unit is top mounted. The strings feed through six holes in the upright plate at the rear of the unit (somewhat similar to the Fender Floating Trem) and the bridge is also rigidly mounted. But the string saddles are vertically mounted grooved "wheels" that roll with the string during vibrato usage, and also make palm muting very easy to achieve. Moseley advertised the unit as the "feather touch" vibrato, and the touch is exceptionally light with all but heavy gauge strings. Pitch stability is excellent. Moseley made several designs of the unit, the first being sand cast, with early versions having an attached string mute beneath the bridge (much like the Fender Jaguar) and a rather short handle. This he called the "Vibramute". Two years later, he slightly simplified the design, going to a die cast design, eliminating the mute (which more players complained about than favored) and lengthening the vibrato arm slightly. This incarnation, called the "Moseley", was used on all Mosrite guitars from that point on. The actual feel and response of the two different models is virtually identical, however. Moseley also designed a companion 12-string vibrato for the 12-string version of the instrument, and this may have been one of the only – if not the only – vibratos designed for use on a 12-string guitar.

== Locking tremolo ==
=== Floyd Rose ===
Floyd Rose concept, using a blade edge pivot but otherwise based on the Fender synchronized tremolo. I is in pitch, II is a downbend, III an upbend.

Around 1979, Floyd D. Rose invented the locking tremolo. This vibrato system became highly popular among 1980s heavy metal guitarists due to its tuning stability and wide range of pitch variation. The original Floyd Rose system was similar to the Fender synchronized tremolo, but with a number of extra mechanisms. The first and most obvious is a locking plate on the head nut, tightened with a hex key that fixes the strings at this point after tuning. This provides extra tuning stability, particularly while using the vibrato arm—but it also prevents tuning with the machine heads.

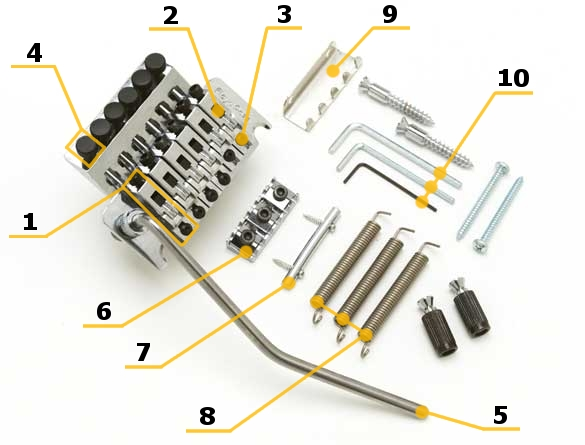
Floyd Rose Pro kit, double locking with fine tuners. See the image description for the numbered parts.

Fine tuners have been provided as part of the bridge mechanism on all but the earliest units to allow minor retuning without unlocking the nut. It is rumored, but has never been confirmed that Eddie Van Halen had a part in the inclusion of the fine tuning unit. In a 1982 Guitar World interview for Van Halen's Diver Down album, Eddie claimed that he co-invented the fine tuners.

Nonetheless, a gift of a unit to Van Halen by Floyd Rose himself gave the unit instant overnight success and credibility. Still more stability was provided by the addition of a second lock on the bridge nut, making a double locking tremolo system that was more complex to set up. The double locking design is sometimes called a two-point locking tremolo, inviting confusion with the Fender two-point synchronized tremolo, which is a different concept and not a locking tremolo at all.

Many guitars equipped with locking tremolo systems have a cavity routed in the body beneath and behind the bridge, extending the range of motion, a concept first popularized by Steve Vai.

Floyd Rose or Floyd Rose licensed locking tremolo units are available factory fitted on many guitars, as well as complete aftermarket retrofit kits. Fitting the correct kit to a guitar already fitted with a compatible tremolo may be quite straightforward; on others a high level of woodworking skill may be required, or it may not be possible at all.

The Fender Deluxe "Locking Tremolo" (better known as Fender/Floyd Rose) is essentially a modified American "2-point tremolo" bridge with locking saddles and pop-in arm. Designed by Fender and Floyd Rose himself, this type of tremolo bridge was introduced in the early '90s on the Deluxe Plus and Ultra series guitars. The concept is primarily intended for guitarists searching for the features of a locking tremolo system without the need to perform routing on their instrument. Nowadays, the Fender Deluxe tremolo is available on American Deluxe, Plus, Ultra Series and many Custom Shop guitars. The whole assembly also includes a set of locking machine heads and an LSR roller nut for optimal tuning stability.

Floyd Rose also produces complete guitars with their tremolo systems - most notably with the Speedloader system, which eliminates conventional peghead tuners, leaving all tuning to the bridge end of the strings. They accomplish this without sacrificing stability by requiring strings that are produced to extremely fine length tolerances, essentially having two ferrule ends and no tail. As of 2006 the Speedloader system is the latest Floyd Rose design, but has yet to catch on to the degree Floyd Rose's original tremolo did.

In 2015, the company began the commercialization of the FRX surface-mounting locking tremolo system, designed to fit exactly on Tune-O-Matic bridge guitars, but with a locking nut that is fastened to the truss rod cover. This model resembles the Washburn Wonderbar in that the springs and strings do not go through the body, thus eliminating the routing necessary to install the classic Floyd Rose tremolo in classic, fixed-bridge electric guitars.

=== Locking synchronized ===
One of the most simplified ways to have a double locking tremolo system without making any major alteration to a solid-body electric guitar can be done by using a modified American Series 2-point synchronized bridge with locking saddles, a set of locking machine heads and a low-friction LSR Roller Nut. Fender's version of this system is also known as Fender/Floyd Rose (Fender Deluxe Locking Tremolo Assembly), as it was developed in conjunction with Floyd Rose.

=== Other locking systems ===
Several other "locking" type vibrato systems have been developed, but none of these have gained the popularity that the Floyd Rose or vintage Fender "tremolo" systems have. The most notable of these is the cam-operated Kahler Double-locking tremolo, which is similar in practical use, but not in design, to the Floyd Rose. Another system that emerged in the 1980s was the Steinberger TransTrem system (meaning Transposing Tremolo).

Ibanez have their own range of double-locking vibrato systems on their range of guitars. The Edge III tremolo, featured on their low-mid range guitars, is a very similar bridge to a Floyd Rose. It features a pop in/out arm and lower profile tuners. Another system is the Edge Zero, which has what Ibanez calls the Zero Point System. This system lets the guitarist lock the guitar's floating state for tuning purposes. There is also the Edge Pro tremolo with a very low profile. Possibly its most notable feature is that it is designed to take strings without the removal of the ball end (or stringing backwards with the ball ends at the headstock). The Edge Pro also comes in a version called the Double Edge Pro, which has piezoelectric pickups for acoustic sound.

In 2007, the Super-Vee company developed a double-locking vibrato system that requires no modifications to the body or neck of the guitar. This system received a patent for its "Blade" technology, which is based on what they call "frictionless action." This action removes the contact pivot point that other vibrato systems rely on, aiming to eliminate wear irregularities that cause tuning instability. Super-Vee also received a patent for their side-locking nut system, which does not require instrument modification.

The Steinberger TransTrem, like the Floyd Rose Speedloader, requires special strings that can only be used on the TransTrem unit. However, the TransTrem had the novel design that the bar could be pushed in to "transpose" the tuning of the entire unit to various other keys. The system saw limited use (mainly due to its high price and limited string availability), although Edward Van Halen had continued to experiment with the system. Notable Van Halen songs where the TransTrem can be heard include "Get Up" and "Summer Nights", from the album 5150.

== Vibrato system additions ==
Various add-on gadgets strive to improve vibrato systems. An issue with nearly all vibrato systems is that bending one string can slightly drop the pitch of all the others—a problem not present on fixed-bridge instruments. One after-market tool, the Tremol-No, temporarily locks the vibrato mechanism. Two thumbscrews let a player choose between completely locked, downwards pitch only, or normal free movement. One of the guitarists who was well known for using this gadget is Guthrie Govan, who had it as a standard feature on his signature guitar models from Suhr Guitars. He has however since moved to Charvel guitars, and appears to have dropped it from his specs. A few vibrato system designs also have various ability to "lock" the system's action: Steinberger TransTrem, Ibanez Edge Zero, Fender Floating/Jaguar/Jazzmaster, and the ChordBender.

Many vibrato systems can be set up in such a way that they allow for changing string pitch both up and down. Eddie Van Halen preferred instead to have his set up so it is flush with the guitar body, which has two advantages: first, a broken string doesn't affect the pitch of the other strings, and it can accommodate attachment of a device called a D-Tuna to the bridge. This device can drop the low E-string down a whole step to D to extend the tonal variety of the guitar, even during live performance.

== Examples ==
=== Notable tracks ===
- Jimmy Shirley's 1945 recording "Jimmy's Blues" is an early recorded example of the Kauffman Vibrola.
- Chet Atkins favored the Bigsby unit, and it can be occasionally heard in a number of his recordings. Generally, Atkins used the Bigsby just to "dip" chords. His 1978 recording of "It Don't Mean a Thing (If It Ain't Got That Swing)" with Les Paul (another Bigsby user) is an example of how Atkins used the device.
- Duane Eddy established his "twangy guitar" sound with a Bigsby vibrato on his Gretsch guitar. Classic examples of this are his recordings of "Rebel Rouser" and "Peter Gunn".
- Lonnie Mack's "Wham!" (1963) is said to have inspired the nickname "whammy bar". According to Neil Young, who, like Mack, favors the Bigsby, "Did I do that first? No, I didn't do that first. You've got to look at guys like Lonnie Mack. He showed everybody how to use a wang bar."
- Prior to Jimi Hendrix, many guitarists used the Fender or Bigsby vibrato to approximate the pedal steel or slide guitar tones found in Hawaiian or Country music. This early vibrato was actuated after striking chords or individual notes; lowering or modulating the pitch as the notes decayed. Hendrix greatly extended the use of vibrato. His studio tracks "Third Stone from the Sun", "Axis: Bold as Love", and "Voodoo Child" (among others) introduced his use of the Stratocaster vibrato. Live tracks such as "The Star-Spangled Banner", "I Don't Live Today", and "Machine Gun" featured vibrato to mimic rockets, bombs, screams and other sound effects—all within the context of blues-based psychedelic rock.
- David Gilmour of Pink Floyd is also known for his controlled use of the vibrato bar.
- A more powerful and heavier use of the vibrato bar is the effect created by grabbing and shaking the bar violently. This style of playing occurs often in heavy metal leads. The band Slayer makes heavy use of vibrato bars; their 1986 song "Raining Blood" fully illustrates this style. They often combine vibrato effects with natural and artificial harmonics, to make a "screaming" or "squealing" sound. Slayer guitarists Kerry King and Jeff Hanneman began using these harmonic squeal effects in 1981.
- Night Ranger guitarist Brad Gillis has based his entire playing style around the use of the "floating tremolo," specifically the first-generation Floyd Rose unit. Some examples are on "Don't Tell Me You Love Me" and "(You Can Still) Rock in America".
- Dimebag Darrell can be heard using the bar extensively on Pantera studio albums.
- Kevin Shields (My Bloody Valentine) created "glide guitar," primarily characterized by extensive use of note bending, via continuous manipulation of the vibrato arm on his Fender Jazzmaster. An example of this is the album Loveless.
- Jimmy Page of Led Zeppelin used a Fender Stratocaster with a "trem" on live versions of the song "In the Evening" to create a pitch change with every chord.

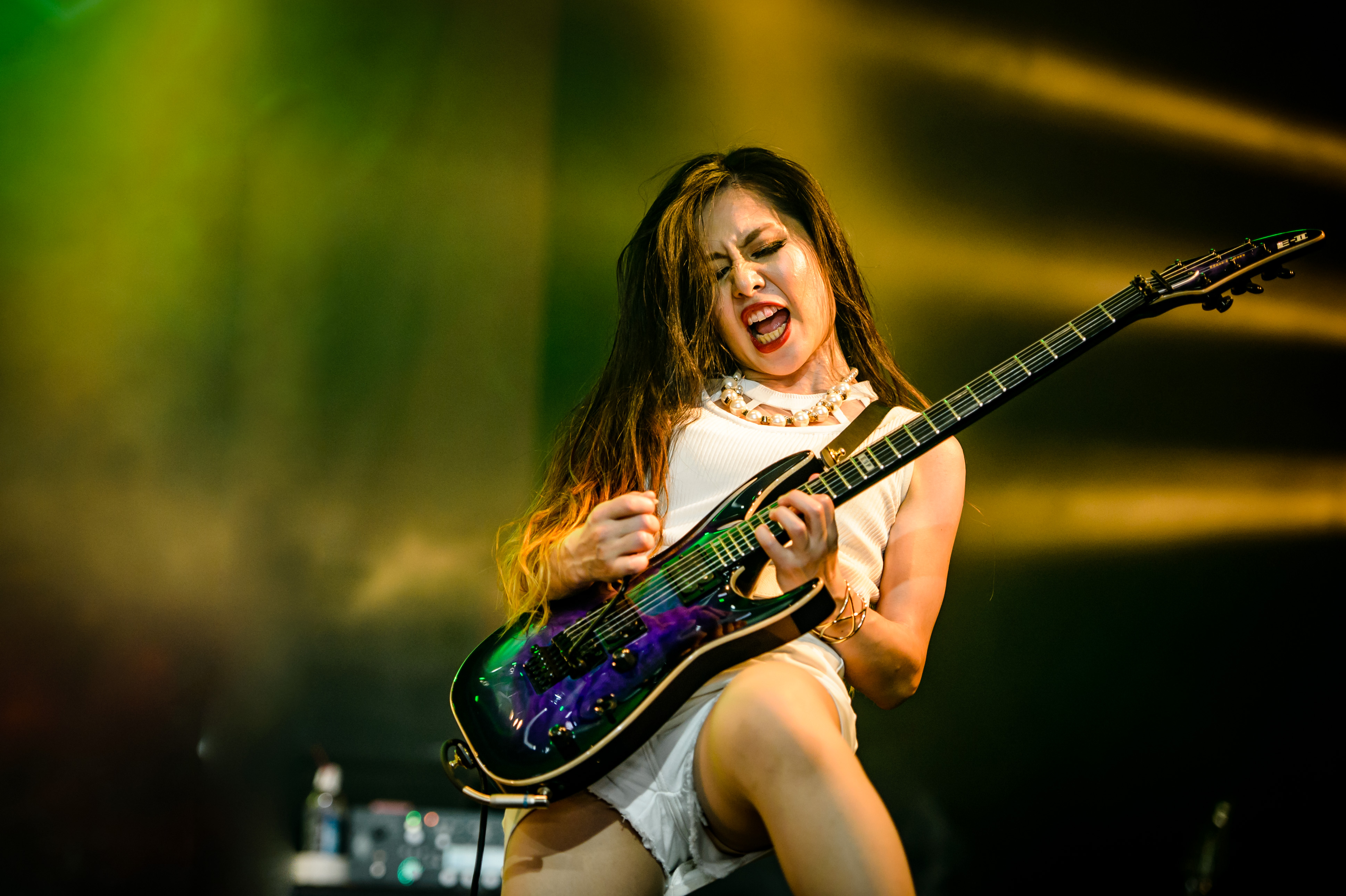
Lovebites guitarist Midori utilizing her guitar's whammy bar

- Tom Morello (Rage Against the Machine, Audioslave) used an Ibanez locking trem on many solos. On the track "Sleep Now in the Fire" from The Battle of Los Angeles, he uses the vibrato bar in unison with kill-switching to raise and lower the sound of the feedback from his amplifier. On the Audioslave track "Original Fire" from Revelations, he depresses the bar to slack and then taps the strings against the pickups and then releases the bar to raise the pitch of the sound. This emulates the sound of monkeys laughing.
- Lovebites guitarist Midori utilizes the whammy bar in her playing; notably the dive bombs on their song "Winds of Transylvania".
- Adrian Belew incorporated frequent use of the vibrato arm on his Stratocaster and Parker guitars. The vibrato arm is often integral to "sound effects" such as animal voices or industrial noises. On the track "Twang Bar King", from the album of the same title, he uses the "twang bar" in a particularly over the top way, effectively resulting in a parody of his own style and vibrato arm use in general.
- Neil Young makes extensive use of a Bigsby vibrato in most of his electric-guitar work, producing an almost constant shifting of pitch in some solos, and simple chord-vibrato in rhythm work. This is accomplished by keeping a grip on the arm of the unit while moving the pick. This technique is prominent on his more hard-rock songs such as "Like a Hurricane", "Hey Hey, My My (Into the Black)" and "Rockin' in the Free World".
- Joe Satriani uses the arm on his Ibanez Edge Trem System often; most of the time to make his signature "Satriani Scream", where he plays a harmonic near the bridge on the G-string and raises the bar. It can be heard on many songs, including "Surfing With The Alien", "The Extremist", and "Flying in a Blue Dream". This technique is used by many similar guitarists of the genre including Steve Vai, Paul Gilbert, Brian "Head" Welch and James "Munky" Schaffer of Korn, and John Petrucci of Dream Theater.
- Jeff Beck was an acknowledged master of the whammy bar. Arguably the best known example of his work is "Where Were You" from the 1989 album Jeff Beck's Guitar Shop.
- Kirk Hammett (Metallica) uses the whammy bar in some of his songs, such as the solos for "Master of Puppets", "Enter Sandman", "The Thing that Should Not Be", and his live solo on Live Shit: Binge & Purge.
- Les Claypool (Primus) installed a Kahler "bass tremolo" on his main four-string bass, a Carl Thompson fretted four string bass guitar. He uses the "tremolo" to create the wobbling bass tone heard on "Frizzle Fry", "Nature Boy", "Too Many Puppies" and "John the Fisherman", along with other Primus songs and in solo work.
- Andy Scott (Sweet) used the tremolo arm with his Gibson 335 and Fender Stratocaster. An example is the recording of "Sweet Fanny Adams/Desolation Boulevard", especially the "Sweet FA" end section.
- Rowland S. Howard's near continuous use of his Fender Jaguar's Floating Tremolo system in bands The Birthday Party, Crime and the City Solution, and These Immortal Souls influenced bands from Sonic Youth to the Yeah Yeah Yeahs. He coupled his use of the "tremolo" with volume and overdrive/fuzz effects to create sustained shrieks, expressive bursts of noise, extreme sound effects, and washes of warped pitch bending, feedback and distortion.
- Herman Li (DragonForce) used vibrato in almost all his guitar solos, producing several unique sound effects. "The Elephant" (first heard by Eddie Van Halen in the mid 1980s), where he turns the volume down, plays a note, raises the pitch with the arm and turns the volume up at the same time, creating a sound similar to an elephant's trumpeting. He also removes the arm and strums it across the strings, creating the "Pac-Man" noise, or runs it up and down the string, creating a "ghost noise". In the song "Cry For Eternity" he combines these, playing four pac-man noises, followed immediately by an Elephant noise.
- Edward Van Halen used many distinct animal noises with his vibrato. He used the "horse whinny" at the beginning of Van Halen's 5150 song "Good Enough". The "horse whinny" is accomplished by striking an artificial harmonic and then raising the arm and then lowering the arm while applying vibrato to mimic a horse's whinny. He is also heard in the mid 1980s doing other animal noises such as "the elephant" to mimic an elephant trumpet.

=== Sound files ===
Guitar vibrato
Brief sample of vibrato.

Riff with vibrato
Example of effects with the tremolo arm on some chords.

Guitar tremolo
Clean tremolo effect from an effects unit, sometimes called a "Vibrato unit", changes the volume and not the pitch

== See also ==
- B-Bender
- Tremulant (from Latin: tremulus)—pipe organ effect that produces both tremolo and vibrato effects
