= Stetsbar =

Vibrato system for electric guitars

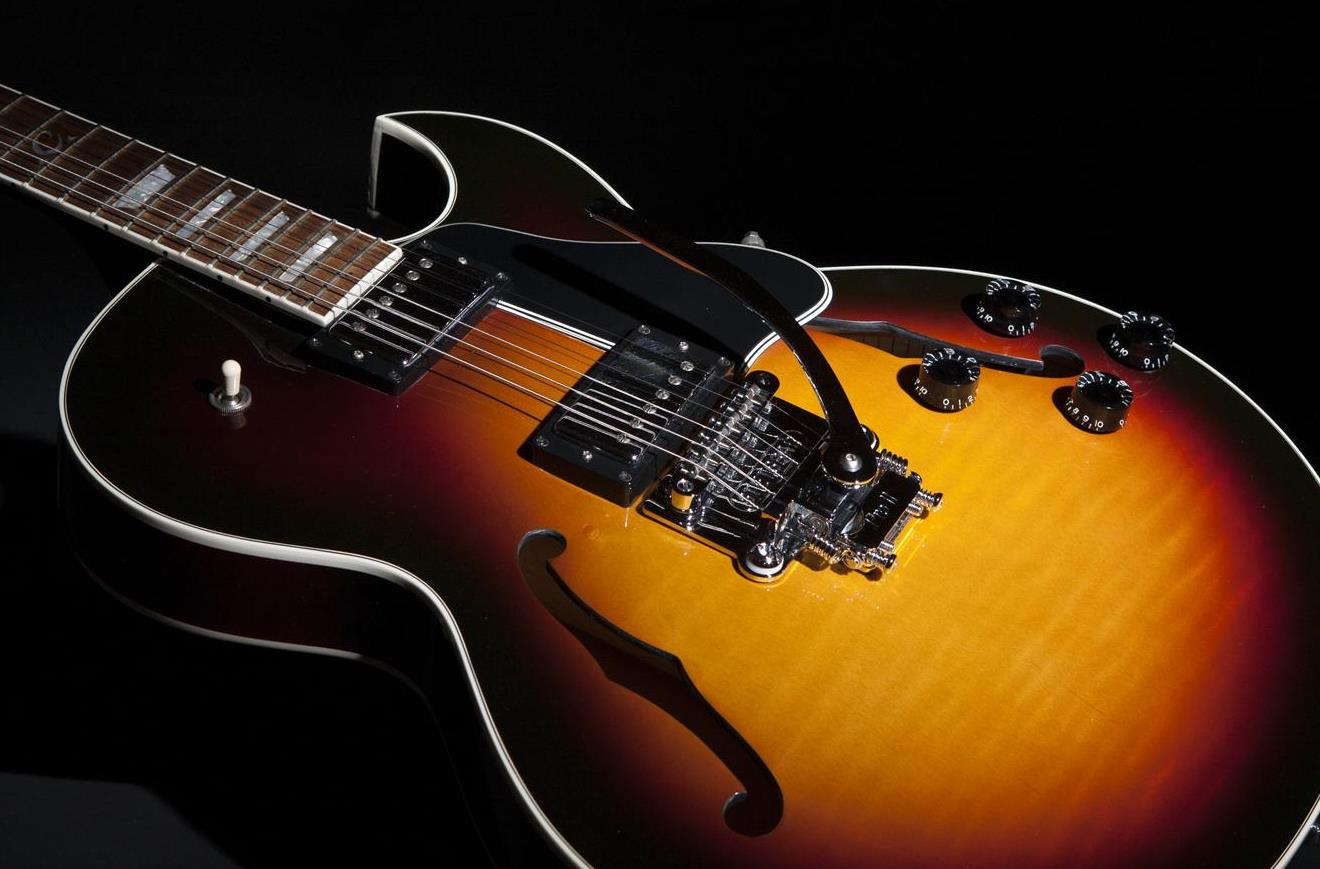
Stetsbar with Vintage Arm mounted on Gibson ES137

The Stetsbar Tremolo system is a vibrato bridge system for the electric guitar. Eric Stets developed the device in the late ‘80s, and patented it in 1995. He originally designed the device to provide a stable vibrato system that could retrofit to “stop-tail” (fixed tailpiece) guitars such as the Gibson Les Paul with no permanent modifications to the instrument.

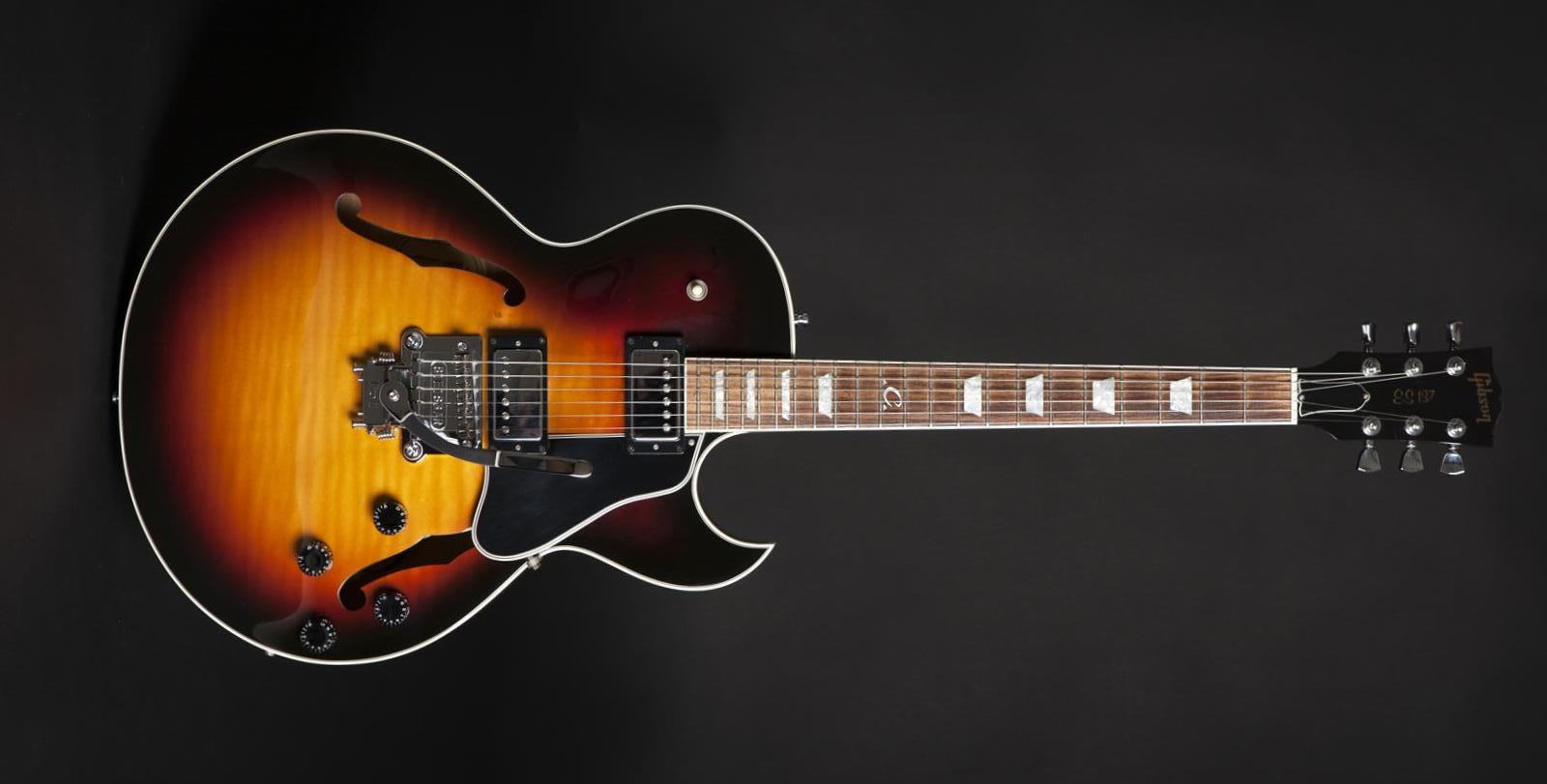
Gibson ES137 with Stetsbar mounted

The manufacturer now provides mounts to accommodate a variety of guitars.

== Principle of operation ==
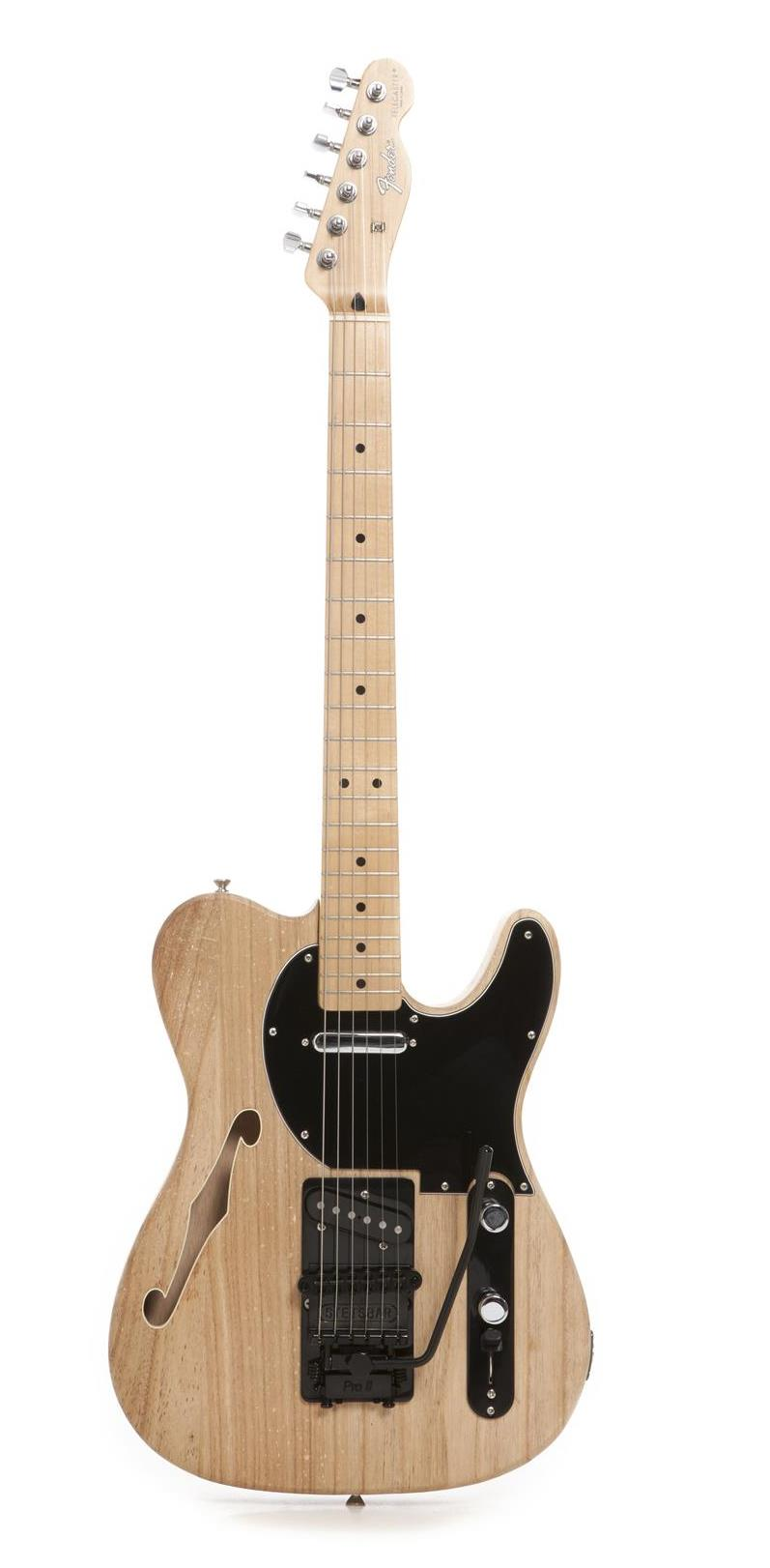
Stetsbar vibrato system mounted on a Fender Telecaster guitar

The Stetsbar is a floating vibrato system—the pull of the guitar strings is held in equilibrium at the scale length of the guitar by two heavy duty springs anchored to a spring retainer block on the unit's base plate.

When a player moves the vibrato bar up or down, the bridge operates with a linear motion in the same plane as the guitar strings. A Tune-O-Matic style bridge mounted on the bridge plate also holds the string anchor block. The bridge plate moves over a pair of linear roller bearings in the base plate. The claim is that the bridge and string anchors move as one eliminating friction over the bridge saddles. An advantage of surface mounting is that installation requires no additional holes or routs in the guitar. This makes installation simple and reversible, and means the device can be moved from one guitar to another.

The Pro II Stetsbar is further equipped with a 'floating lock' system. When engaged this keeps the unit in tune if a string breaks or the player double-stop bends a string. It also allows drop tuning on the fly, and still provides pitch-up movement.

== Available models ==
The Stetsbar comes in a number of variants, which differ only in base plate design. The manufacturer offers various finishes for the base plates and other parts to facilitate matching a guitar's existing hardware.

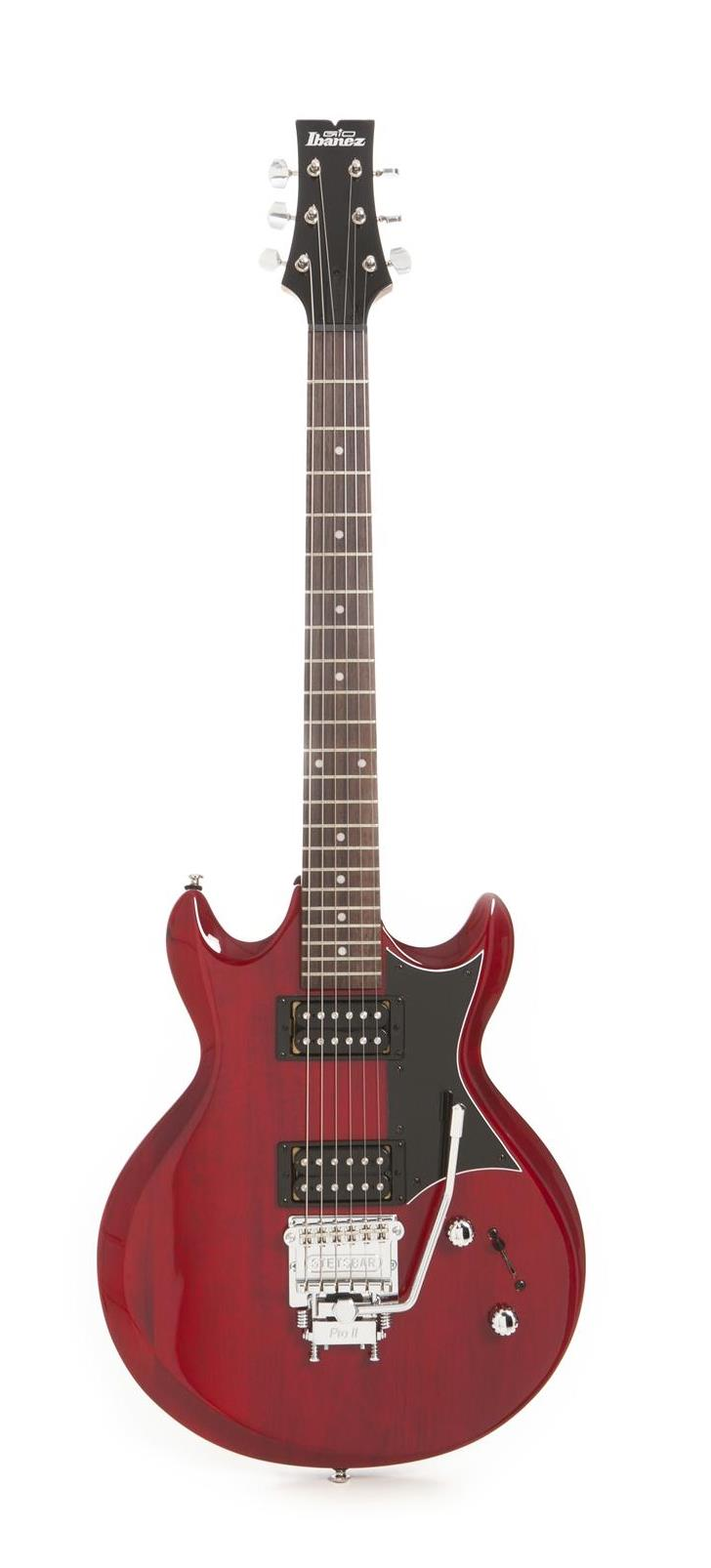
Stetsbar tremolo/vibrato system mounted on an Ibanez guitar

Available models are:

- Stop Tail – for guitars with a fixed tailpiece/bridge assembly, such as Gibson Guitar's Les Paul, Gibson SG, and Gibson ES-335 models. Installation uses the existing threaded stop tail bushings. The latest Pro II base plate replaces the rounded base plate with a rectangular design.
- T-Style – replaces a Fender Telecaster or similar guitar's bridge assembly. This base plate accommodates remounting the guitars diagonal bridge pickups, and offers both three and four screw hole fitting points common on various Telecaster style guitars.
- S-Style – replaces a Fender Stratocaster or similar guitar's tremolo. The Stetsbar's base plate clamps into the existing tremolo cavity.
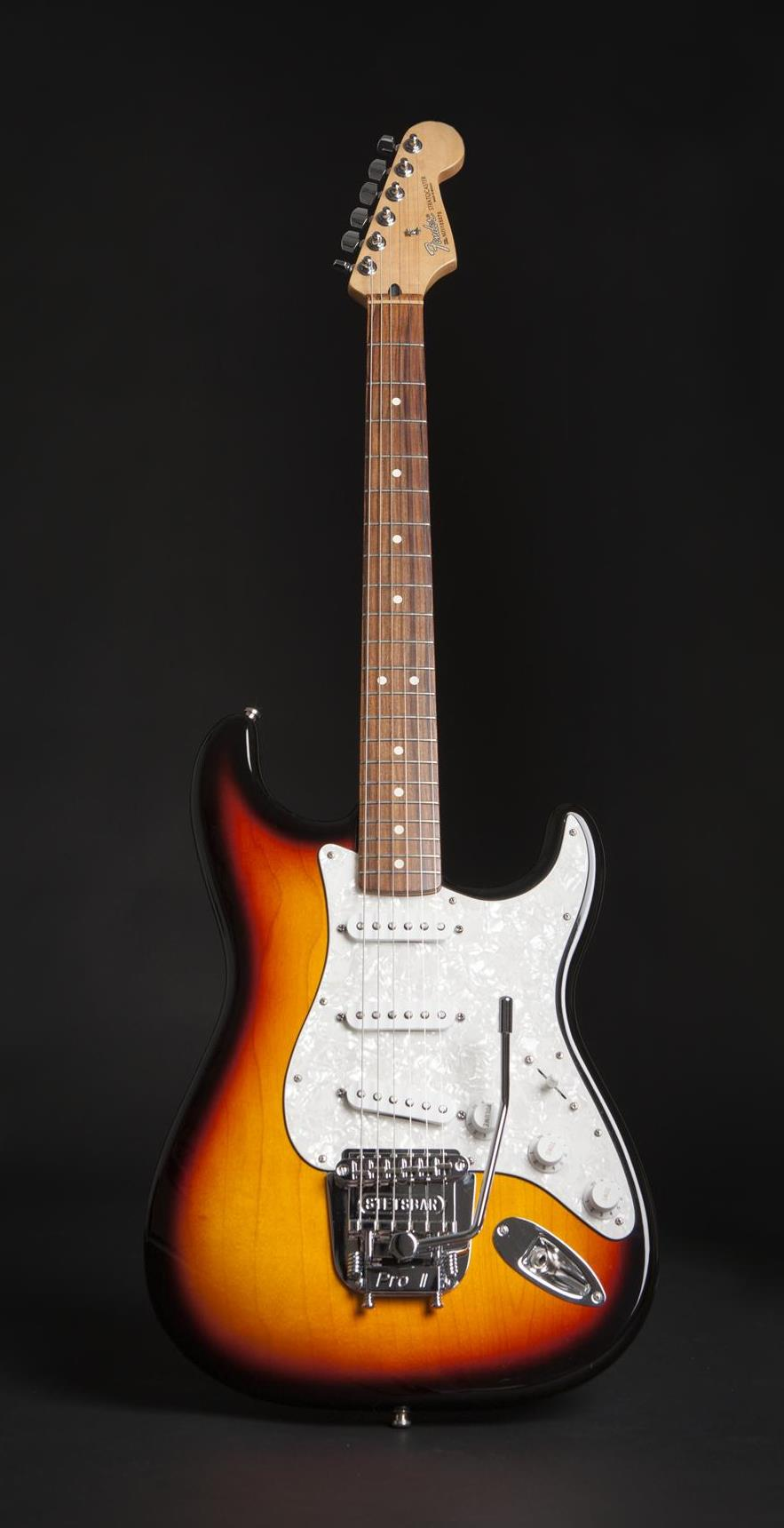
  Stetsbar tremolo/vibrato system mounted on a Fender Stratocaster guitar
- Hard Tail – mounts on guitars with a 5-hole hard tail mount point, such as certain Fender Stratocasters and Squier Telecasters.
- OEM – mounts on guitars that incorporate the vibrato during initial construction. Its minimal base plate is almost completely hidden under the main bridge plate, and it can be counter-sunk into the top of the guitar.

Variations of these models contain various makes of piezo pickup saddle or graphite bridges.

Accessory items now include a Stetsbar 'Vintage' Arm and a Stetsbar Fine-Tuner device suitable for use with Stetsbars and other guitars with similar stop-tail configurations.

== Notable users ==
Professional Stetsbar users include Jan Akkerman, Snowy White, Randy Bachman, Elliott Randall, Mike Chain, Reeves Gabrels, Hershel Yatovitz, Cask J. Thomson, John Bohlinger, and Dave Gutter of Rustic Overtones and Paranoid Social Club.
