= Tremolo (electronic effect) =

Guitar effect

Tremolo, in electronics, is the variation in amplitude of sound achieved through electronic means, sometimes mistakenly called vibrato, and producing a sound somewhat reminiscent of flanging, referred to as an "underwater effect". A variety of means are available to achieve the effect. For further information about the use of tremolo in music, including notation, see Tremolo.

== History ==
The first self-standing electronic tremolo effects unit may have been produced by DeArmond, in which a motor shakes a canister containing a "hydro-fluid" (not mercury as some people assume), oscillating the canister containing an electrolytic fluid that sends the signal to ground. Earliest references to DeArmond's tremolo unit date to 1941. Starting in the 1950s many companies began incorporating the effect into guitar amplifiers, including the Fender Tremolux and Vibrolux: Leo Fender marked the effect on Fender amplifiers as "vibrato", conversely calling the vibrato arm on his Fender Stratocaster a tremolo arm. The most notable early amplifiers with built-in tremolo functions were the 1961 Fender Princeton and the Gibson Falcon. In such amplifiers, the tremolo circuit was relatively simple, using as little as a dozen components and one half of a tube of the preamp circuit. The effect was achieved through "bias wiggle", in which the bias of a tube, in the preamp or output stage, was modulated (turned off and on, or partly off and on) in a pure sine wave. Such circuits typically had controls for speed and depth, and produced an effect described as "lush, warm, and roundly pulsing".

Later amplifiers, and particularly the Fender Blackface amps of the mid 1960s and the later Silverface amps, used a much more complex circuit, producing the kind of effect that was especially popular with surf musicians. Modulation was produced using an optocoupler, a light-dependent resistor whose pulsating signal (producing a lopsided wave) affects the preamp circuit.
