= Vibrato unit =

Diamond Pedals VIB1 Vibrato unit

A vibrato unit is an electronic effects unit used to add vibrato to the sound of an electric instrument, most often an electric guitar. Vibrato units may be individual stomp boxes or built into multi-effects units, but are traditionally built into guitar amplifiers. Vibrato units are particularly used in surf music.

The name vibrato unit is contrary to normal usage of the term vibrato, and in that sense the unit is incorrectly named. The guitaring tradition of using the term "vibrato" to refer to a tremolo effect began in 1956 with Leo Fender's use of the term in naming the Fender Vibrolux. In all other contexts the effect produced by a traditional vibrato unit is known as tremolo rather than vibrato.

A few guitar amplifiers do feature true pitch shifting vibrato, notably some models offered in the late 1950s and into the 60s by Magnatone and presently by Juke Amplification. Still other amplifier manufacturers describe the effect, in accordance with standard music terminology, as tremolo.

== History ==
What is now called a vibrato unit was one of the earliest electronic guitar effects. Danelectro, Gibson, and Premier all produced guitar amplifiers with built-in amplitude modulation units in the late 1940s.

The term vibrato was first applied to the effect in 1956 with the introduction of the Fender Vibrolux. Fender's first amplifier with this effect, the Fender Tremolux model 5E9, had been introduced in the previous year. Despite the different names, the effects circuits were similar, and the effects almost identical.

== Controls ==
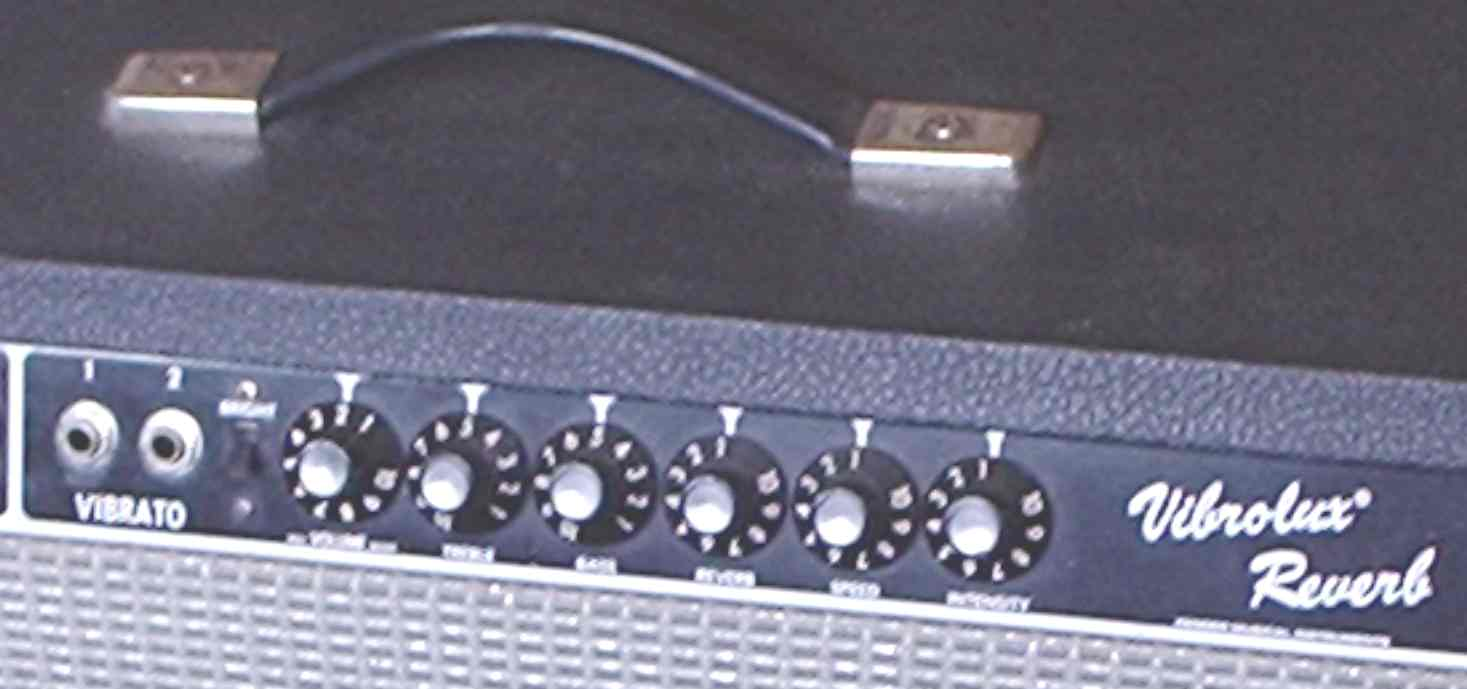
The vibrato/reverb channel of a Fender Vibrolux amplifier. The potentiometers, from left to right, read Volume, Treble, Bass, Reverb, Speed and Intensity.

A vibrato unit normally has three controls:

- Speed controls the frequency of the variation, typically from a maximum (fully clockwise) of five to ten hertz to a minimum which may be as slow as one cycle taking several seconds.
- Depth or intensity controls the amplitude (volume) of the variation. The minimum depth (fully anticlockwise) is typically (but not always) zero, that is no effect on the sound at all; The maximum depth does not normally cut the sound off completely at the cycle minimum, but may reduce it by as much as 6 dB, virtually a cut off to the ear.
- An on/off control, traditionally a pull-on switch on the depth potentiometer, a foot switch, or both. The off position bypasses the unit. In the case of an amplifier mounted unit where both switches are supplied, the unit is bypassed if the pull-on switch is off, regardless of the pedal. If the pedal is not plugged in, the unit is turned on and off by the pull-on switch; If the pedal is plugged in, then it controls the unit when the pull-on switch is on.

== Vibrato or tremolo? ==
Guitar vibrato
Guitar tremolo effect (changing volume) as Vibrato unit

The term "vibrato unit" was introduced on high-end Fender guitar amplifiers in the 1950s, starting with the Vibrolux amplifier in 1956, in the same period in which what is now called a "tremolo arm" was introduced on Fender guitars.

The "synchronised tremolo" was introduced in 1954 on the first Stratocaster guitar. The only previously successful "tremolo arm" was the Bigsby vibrato tailpiece, often simply called a "Bigsby". In 1958, Fender reinforced his usage with the "Fender floating tremolo" on the Jazzmaster and some subsequent guitars. The "synchronised tremolo" became the most copied of these three basic patterns of "tremolo arm", although both of the others continue to have some following.

In both the case of the "tremolo arm" and "vibrato unit", Leo Fender had reversed the established usage of the terms vibrato and tremolo. That is, he called a device that produced true vibrato a "synchronised tremolo", and a device that produced true tremolo a "vibrato unit". In fact he was using the terms interchangeably. The first Fender vibrato unit (1954) was called "tremolo", and some later Fender tremolo arms were called "vibrato tailpieces" or similar.

But the terms that became established were "tremolo arm" and "vibrato unit", both contrary to standard usage, with the result that electric guitarists traditionally use the terms "vibrato" and "tremolo" in the opposite senses to all other musicians when describing these hardware devices and the effects they produce.

== True vibrato ==
Demonstration of a vibrato effect pedal, varying the pitch of the signal.

Guitarists do also produce true vibrato in many different ways, including:

- As finger vibrato similar to that produced by movement of the left hand on the violin and other stringed instruments.
- By use of the vibrato arm provided (by whatever name) on many electric and some acoustic guitars.
- By manipulating the tailpiece of an archtop guitar not fitted with a tremolo arm, normally with the right hand. This is particularly a jazz and blues technique.
- By manipulating the strings between the head nut and machine heads. This is particularly used on open strings of a bass guitar.
- By use of effects units such as flangers, phasers and chorus effects, that are able to modulate the pitch rather than just the volume. Some manufacturers also produce vibrato pedals.
- By use of moving loudspeaker and/or moving loudspeaker baffle systems such as the Leslie speaker.
- By use of the motor-driven Kaufman Vibrato tailpiece built into some early Rickenbacker guitars, and similar units.

In common with all other musicians, all guitarists from classical to rock use the term vibrato to describe finger vibrato.

== See also ==
- Tremulant — a pipe organ effect involving tremolo & vibrato simultaneously; possibly one origin of confusions of tremolo & vibrato.
- Vibrato systems for guitar
