= List of Rickenbacker products =

Rickenbacker International Corporation
- Industry: Musical instruments
- Founded: 1931
- Founder: George Beauchamp and Adolph Rickenbacher
- Headquarters: 3895 South Main Street, Santa Ana, California, USA
- Area served: Global
- Key people: George Beauchamp, Adolph Rickenbacher
- Products: Lap and Console steel guitars Guitars; Bass guitars Electric violins Electric mandolins Electric banjos Amplifiers
- Website: Rickenbacker.com

This is a product list of items manufactured by Rickenbacker International Corporation, and predecessor companies, including musical instruments, amplifiers and accessories. The three Rickenbacker Vintage series (B - 1st, V - 2nd and C - 3rd) are listed in numerical order within the relevant product sections, not as a separate grouping, as are Specials and Limited Editions.

== Ro-Pat-In Corporation ==
=== Hawaiian Electro Guitar ===
- MODEL A "Frying Pan"
  - Model A-22 6 string
  - Model A-22 7 string
  - Model A-25 6 string
  - Model A-24 7 string

== Electro String Instrument Corporation ==
=== Electro Series ===
- MODEL ES
  - Model ES-16
  - Model ES-17

== Rickenbacker Electro Hawaiian Guitar ==
- MODEL 59
- MODEL 100
- MODEL 1002
- MODEL "ACE" - student
- MODEL B - Bakelite Steel Guitar
  - Model B-6
  - Model B-7
  - Model B-8
  - Model B-10
- MODEL BD - Bakelite Steel Guitar Deluxe
  - Model BD-6
  - Model BD-7
  - Model BD-8
- MODEL CW
  - Model CW-6
  - Model CW-7
  - Model CW-8
  - Model CW-10
- MODEL D
  - Model D-12
  - Model D-14
  - Model D-16
  - Model DC-16
- MODEL DW
  - Model DW-12
  - Model DW-16
- MODEL ES
  - Model ES-16
  - Model ES-17
- MODEL G
  - Model G-6
  - Model G-7
  - Model G-8
- MODEL JB-10 "Jerry Bird"
- MODEL NF
  - Model NF-6
  - Model NF-16
- MODEL NS
  - Model NS-6
  - Model NS100-6
  - Model NS100-8
- MODEL S
  - Model S
  - Model S59
  - Model S100
- MODEL SD
  - Model SD-6
  - Model SD-7
  - Model SD-8
- MODEL SW
  - Model SW-6
  - Model SW-8
- MODEL TW

=== Console Series ===
- Double-neck Range
  - Console 206
  - Console 208
  - Console 218
- Triple-neck Range
  - Console 500
  - Console 508
  - Console 518
- 700 Series
  - Console 700
  - Console 706
  - Console 708
  - Console 718
  - Console 758
  - Console 768

== Rickenbacker Electro Spanish Guitar ==
- Spanish Guitar (standard)
- Ken Roberts Model Spanish Guitar
- Model SP
- Model B Spanish Guitar
- Vibrola Spanish Guitar

=== 200 Series ===
- Model 220 "Hamburg"
- Model 230 "Hamburg"
- Model 230 GF (Glenn Frey Limited Edition)
- Model 230 GFLH
- Model 2050 "El Dorado"
- Model 2060 "El Dorado"

=== Rickenbacker 300 Series (Thin Body) ===
==== Standard 3/4 Range ====
- Model 310
- Model 315
- Model 320
  - Model 320B
  - Model 320B LH
- Model 320/12V63
- Model 325 (RM 1996)
  - Model 325C58
  - Model 325C64
  - Model 325 JL (John Lennon Limited Edition)
  - Model 325 JLLH
  - Model 325V59
  - Model 325V59 "Hamburg"
  - Model 325V63
  - Model 325V63 "Miami"
- Model 325/12
  - Model 325/12V63
  - Model 325/12 WRC

==== Standard Full Size Range ====
- Model 330
- Model 330/12
  - Model 330/12 Mid
  - Model 330S/12 (RM1997)
- Model 331LS "Light Show"
- Model 335
- Model 336/12
- Model 340
- Model 341LS "Light Show"
- Model 340S (RM1998)
- Model 340/12
- Model 345
  - Model 345S
- Model 350 "Liverpool"
  - Model 350V63 "Liverpool"
  - Model 350/12V63 "Liverpool"
  - Model 350 SH (Susanna Hoffs Limited Edition)
- Model 355 JL (John Lennon Limited Edition)
  - Model 355 JLLH
- Model 355/12 JL
  - Model 355/12 JLLH

==== Deluxe Semi-Acoustic 3/4 Range ====
- Model 360 (RM 1993)
  - Model 360B
  - Model 360B LH
  - Model 360CW (Carl Wilson Limited Edition)
  - Model 360 SPC RCA
  - Model 360 "Tuxedo"
  - Model 360V64
  - Model 360V64 LH
- Model 360/12
  - Model 360/12B
  - Model 360/12C63
  - Model 360/12 CW (Carl Wilson Limited Edition)
  - Model 360/12 RCA
  - Model 360/12V64
  - Model 360/12V66
- Model 362/12 - Double-neck
- Model 365
- Model 366
- Model 370
- Model 370/12
  - Model 370/12 LH
  - Model 370/12 RM (Roger McGuinn Limited Edition)
  - Model 370/12V67
- Model 375

==== Deluxe Semi-Acoustic Full Body Range ====
- Model 345F
- Model 360F
  - Model 360F "Blue Boy" (x3)
- Model 360/12F
- Model 365F
- Model 370F
- Model 375F

==== Deep Body Acoustic Range ====
- Model 380
  - Model 380L "Laguna"
  - Model 380L PZ
- Model 381
  - Model 381JK (John Kay Limited Edition)
  - Model 381V69
  - Model 381/12
  - Model 381/12V69
- Model 385
  - Model 385S
- Model 386
- Model 390
- Model 391
- Model 392

=== Combo 400 Series (Full Size Solid Body) ===
- Model 400 - student
- Model 420
- Model 425 (DUPA)
  - Model 425 - Student Model
  - Model 425V63
- Model 430
- Model 450
- Model 450/12
- Model 456/12
- Model 460
- Model 470
- Model 480
- Model 481 SF
- Model 483
- Model 490

=== Combo 600 Series (Solid Body) ===
- Model 600
- Model 610
- Model 610/12
- Model 615
- Model 620
  - Model 620VB
- Model 620/12
- Model 625
- Model 625/12 (one off for Mike Campbell)
- Model 650
  - Model 650A/C/D/E/F/S
- Model 660
- Model 660/12
  - Model 660/12 TP (Tom Petty Limited Edition)

=== Acoustic 700 Series ===
- Model 700C "Comstock"
- Model 700S "Shasta"
- Model 700C/12 "Comstock"
- Model 700S "Shasta"
- Model 730L "Laramie"
- Model 730/12L "Laramie"
- Model 730 Shiloh
- Model 760J "Jazz-bo"

=== Combo 800 Series (Solid Body) ===
- Model 800
- Model 850

=== Combo 900 Series (3/4 Solid Body) ===
- Model 900
- Model 950
- Model 1000

=== Rose Morris Series ===
- Model 1993 (330/60-12 Export)
  - Model 1993V
  - Model 1993V/12
- Model 1995 (615 Export)
- Model 1996 (325 Export) "The Beatle Backer"
  - Model 1996V
- Model 1997 (335 Export)
  - Model 1997V
- Model 1997SPC VB
- Model 1998 (345 Export)
  - Model 1998PT (Pete Townshend Limited Edition)

== Rickenbacker Electro Bass Guitar ==
- Tenor Guitar

=== Rose Morris Series ===
- Model 1999 (4001 Export)

=== 2000 Series ===
- Model 2020 "Hamburg"
- Model 2030 "Hamburg"
- Model 2030 GF (Glenn Frey Signature)
- Model 2030 Mid
- Model 2050 "El Dorado"
- Model 2060 "El Dorado"

=== 3000 Series ===
- Model 3000
- Model 3001

=== 4000 Series ===
- Model 4000
  - Model 4000 FL

==== 4001 Range ====
- Model 4001
  - Model 4001C64
  - Model 4001C64S
  - Model 4001 CS (Chris Squire Limited Edition)
  - Model 4001 FL
  - Model 4001 LH
  - Model 4001S
  - Model 4001S FL
  - Model 4001S PMC (Paul McCartney Limited Edition)
  - Model 4001V63
  - Model 4001V63 MG
  - Model 4001V63 PMC
- Model 4001-5

==== 4002 Range ====
- Model 4002 - Studio

==== 4003 Range ====
- Model 4003
- Model 4003AC (Al Cisneros Limited Edition)
- Model 4003 FL
- Model 4003 LH
- Model 4003 "Shadow"
- Model 4003 SPC "Redneck"
- Model 4003 SPC-8 "Redneck"
- Model 4003 SPC "Tuxedo"
- Model 4003S
- Model 4003SB
- Model 4003SB LH
- Model 4003S LH
- Model 4003S SPC "Blackstar"
- Model 4003VPCB
- Model 4003S/5
- Model 4003S/8

• Model 4003w

• Model 4003sw

==== 4004 Range ====
- Model 4004Ci "Cheyenne"
- Model 4004Cii "Cheyenne"
- Model 4004Cii-5 "Cheyenne"
- Model 4004L (Laredo)
- Model 4004 LK (Lemmy Kilmister Limited Edition)

==== 4005 Range ====
- Model 4005
- Model 4005/5
- Model 4005/6
- Model 4005/8
- Model 4005 LS "Lightshow"

==== Higher Range ====
- Model 4008 - 8 string
- Model 4080 - Double-neck (4 + 6 string)
- Model 4080/12 - Double-neck (4 + 12 string)
- Model 4080/12/6 - Triple-neck (4 + 6 + 12 string)

== Rickenbacker Electro Mandolin ==
- Model Mando Guitar
- Model 5000 (4 string)
- Model 5001 (5 string)
- Model 5002 (8 string)
  - Model 5002V58 Mandolin

== Rickenbacker Electro Banjo ==
- Model 6000 Bantar
- Model 6005 Banjoline
- Model 6006 Banjoline Deluxe

== Other Instruments ==
- Harpo Marx (Electric Harp)
- Electro Violin

== Amplifiers ==
=== B Series ===
- B-9A
- B-14A
- B-15A
- B-16 Head
- B-16 Combo
- B-22
- B-410

R35B

=== M Series ===
- Model M-8
- Model M-8E
- Model M-9
- Model M-10
- Model M-11
- Model M-11A
- Model M-12
- Model M-12A
- Model M-14A
- Model M-15
- Model M-15A
- Model M-16
- Model M-22
- Model M-23
- Model M-30
- Model M-88
- Model M-98

=== R Series ===
- R7
- R14
- R35B
- R220
- RG30
- RG16T
- RB30
- RB120

=== TR Series ===
- TR7
- TR 14
- TR25
- TR35B
- TR50

=== Others ===
- Cut Out 1943
- Ek-O-Tone reverb
- Lunchbox 1934
- Model 59
- Ninety-eight High Fidelity Amplifier
- PA-38
- PA-120

=== Extension Speakers ===
- E-12
- E-15
- The Speaker

== Accessories ==
=== Cases ===
- No. 700
- No. 21-D-1
- C300 (3/4 /D/S)
- C400
- C430
- C600 (D/S)

=== Microphones ===
- 664 Microphone

=== Pedals ===
- No. 300 - Pedal Volume Control for Hawaiian and Spanish guitars

=== Pics ===
- Pics 14-C
- Speed pics 61-C

=== Stands ===
- MS-10c
- MS-11C

=== Others ===
Pick Display Cabinets, Hawaiian Guitar Stand, Electro Strings, Slides, Amplifier Covers, Amplifier Legs, Guitar Legs, Amplifier Tube kits, Dust Cloth, Phantasmagorion,

== Colors and Body Finish ==
'Fireglo' (a shaded red), the company's longest running color option, has been made available every year since 1958, with 'Jetglo' (black) and 'Mapleglo' (natural) right behind, being made available every year since 1959. The colors' names usually have official abbreviations (such as 'JG' for 'Jetglo').

=== Current Available Colors ===
- Fireglo (FG) - a sunburst color; deep dark red that fades into a lighter maple center
- Jetglo (JG) - black
- Mapleglo (MG) - Natural
- Walnut (W) - Walnut unlacquered body with natural unpolished maple neck and fretboard. Introduced 2014 (not the same as WAL).
- Matte Black (MBL)
- Matte Autumnglo (MAG) - a matte sunburst color; deep brown that fades into a yellow center

Non-standard, only available for 650 series:

- Walnut Oil Finish (WAL)

Non-standard, 480/481/483 Series:

- Among the 'special' colors available for the 480 series guitars, AutumnGlo (AUTUM) and Walnut (WAL) are often mistaken as being the same. AutumnGlo on the 480 series represented a flat matte finish, where Walnut designated the same color and burst, but in a traditional lacquered finish.

=== Formerly available colors ===
- Blonde (1954 - 1957)
- Brown (1954 - 1957)
- Green (1954 - 1957)
- Turquoise Blue (1954 - 1957)
- Jet Black (1954 - 1957)
- Autumnglo (1957 - 1983)
- Natural (1957 - 1960)
- White (1957, 1969 - 1999)
- Burgundyglo (1963 - 1983)
- Azureglo (1969 - 1984)
- Ruby Red (1978 - 1984, 2012 - 2017)
- Silver (1978 - 1984)
- Red (1984 - 1997)
- Turquoise (1989 - 2002)
- Midnight Blue (1986 - 2019, mid-1960s 360/6's)

=== Colors of the Year: 2000-2006 ===
Rickenbacker produced a 'color of the year' for most of their models from 2000 to 2006.

- 2000: Sea Green
- 2001: Desert Gold
- 2002: Burgundy
- 2003 - 2004: Montezuma Brown
- 2004: Blue Boy
- 2005: Blue Burst
- 2006: Amber Fireglo

Other finish options:

Recently (as of February 2024), special limited edition runs (typically 25 units) of instruments have been commissioned including British Racing Green (BRG), Snowglo and Pillar Box Red.

Additionally, a selection of models were released to commemorate the 75th Anniversary of Rickenbacker in Dark Cherry Metallic (DCM),
