= Rickenbacher =

Rickenbacher is a surname. It originated as a toponymic surname for someone from one of many places named Rickenbach. Notable people with the surname include:

- Adolph Rickenbacker (originally Rickenbacher), co-founder of the Rickenbacker guitar company
- Eddie Rickenbacker (originally Rickenbacher), World War I flying ace, head of Eastern Airlines
- Karl Anton Rickenbacher, Swiss orchestra conductor
- Rudolf Rickenbacher, Swiss soccer player

== See also ==
- Rickenbacker (disambiguation)
