= Electro-Spanish Model B =

1935 electric guitar by Rickenbacker

Rickenbacher Electro-Spanish Model B
- Manufacturer: Rickenbacker

Construction
- Body type: Solid-Body,
- Neck joint: Bolt on
- Scale: 22.5"

Woods
- Body: Bakelite
- Neck: Bakelite
- Fretboard: Bakelite with pearl or paint dot inlay

Hardware
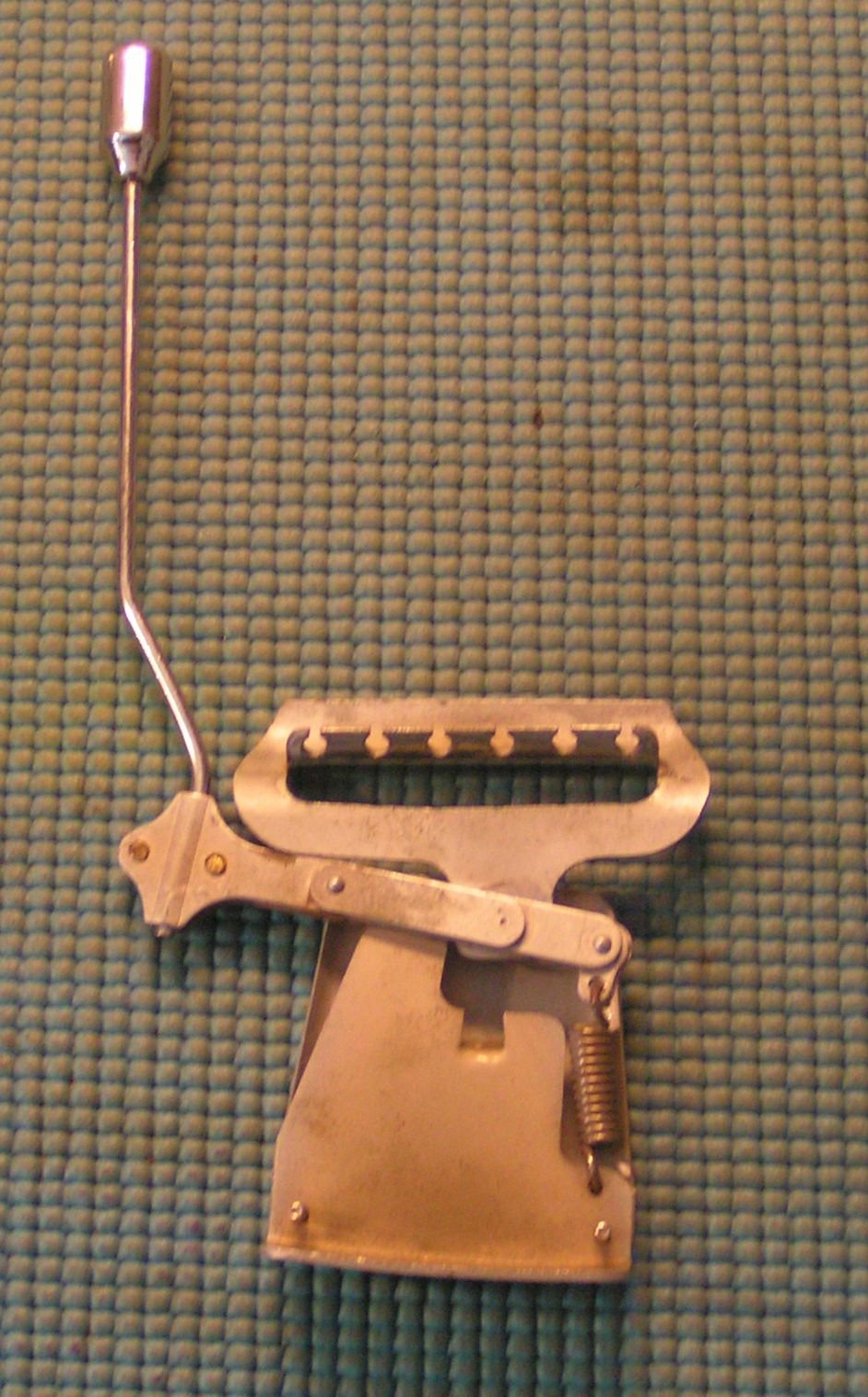
- Bridge: Vib-rol-a patented by Clayton Doc Kauffman Kauffman Vibrola

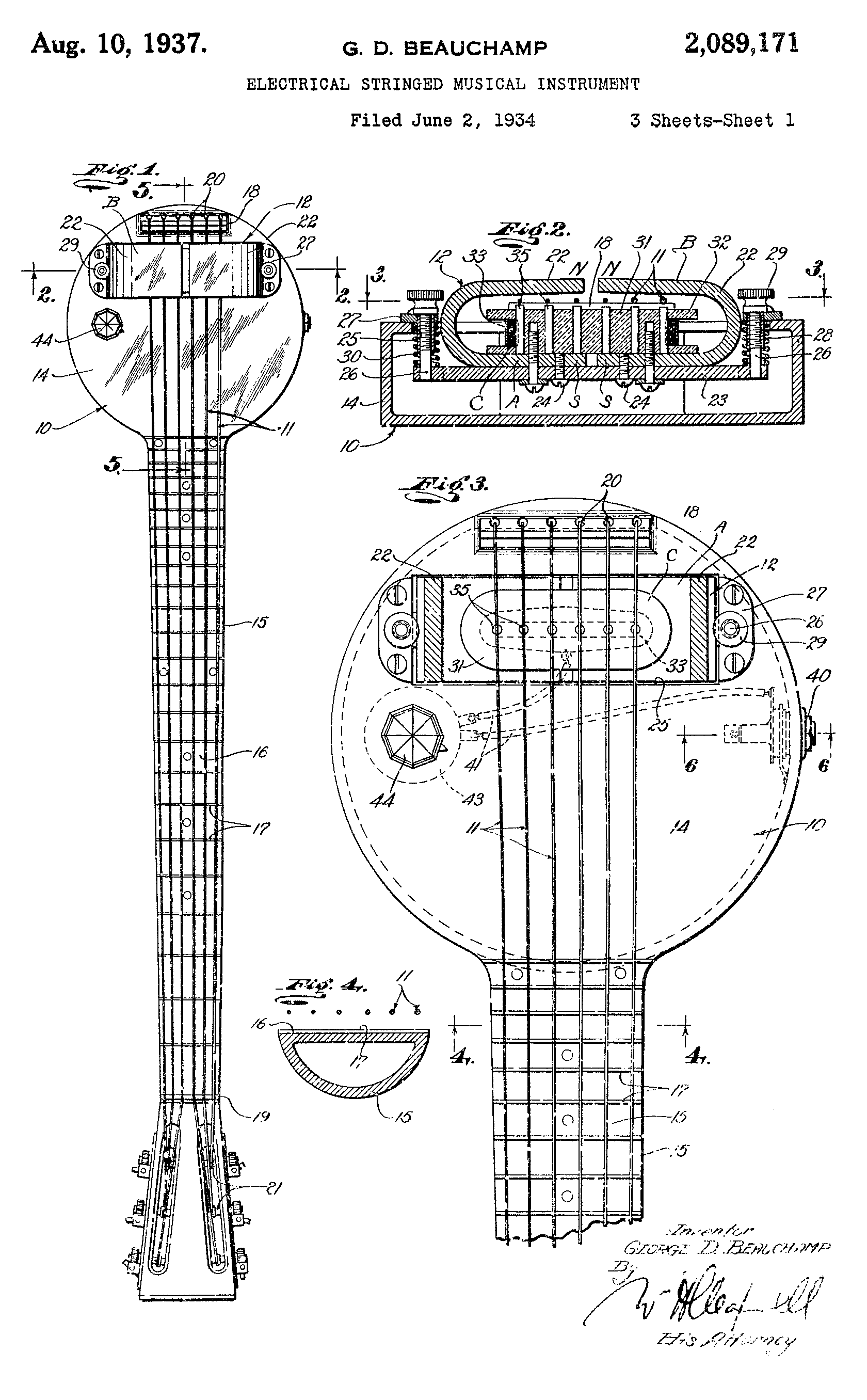
- Pickup(s): Horseshoe pickup Horseshoe Pickup

Colors available
- black/brown

The Electro-Spanish Model B was the world's first production, solid body (Bakelite) electrified guitar, officially released in 1935 by Rickenbacker, and based on the 1931 "Model B Hawaiian" Lap Steels. Unlike the Square-necked lap steel models, the "Electro-Spanish" model had a round neck and was meant to be played as a conventional guitar. Commercially, it was the most successful musical instrument manufactured by Rickenbacker. Though not entirely solid - it had thick plastic (Bakelite) walls and a detachable Spanish neck. The instrument was created to eliminate the feedback found in conventional electrification of stringed instruments.

The Electro-Spanish Model B set the stage for solid body guitars to develop; including the Fender Esquire in 1950 and the Gibson Les Paul in 1952.
