= Electro-Spanish Ken Roberts =

Early model of electric guitar

Rickenbacker Electro Instrument company electric Spanish Ken Roberts Model
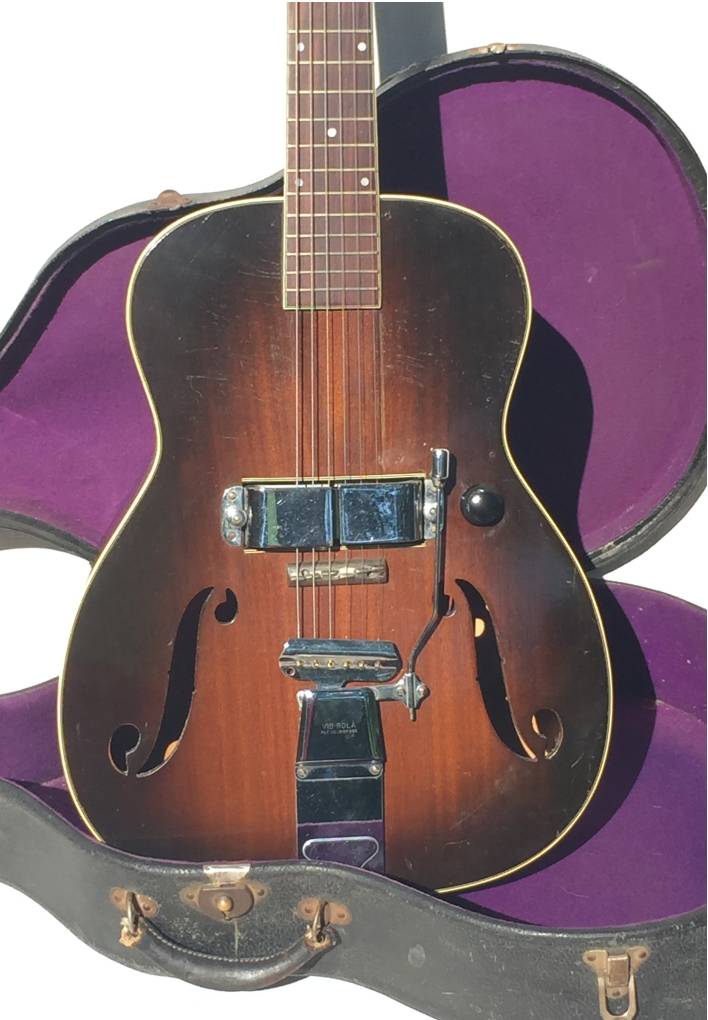
- Manufacturer: Rickenbacker
- Period: (1931–1938 production) Official Release 1935

Construction
- Body type: Hollow, Semi-hollow
- Neck joint: Set neck
- Scale: 25"

Woods
- Body: Mahogany (with binding)
- Neck: Usually Mahogany or Maple(with binding)
- Fretboard: Rosewood

Hardware
- Bridge: Vib-Rola
- Pickup: Horseshoe pickup

Colors available
- Sunburst

The Ken Roberts is an early model of the electric guitar made by Electro-Spanish, the precursor to the Rickenbacker brand. The first electric instrument to be named after an endorser, the Ken Roberts model anticipated several features that would become popular in future electric guitar design, like the use of a vibrato bridge and a neck joined to the body at a higher fret to aid access to higher notes.

== History ==
Produced between 1931–1938, the instrument line was officially released in 1935 and was terminated in 1938. It is estimated that less than 50 total quantity were produced & sold between 1935–1938. Less than 10 are known to survive as of 2017. It was the first electric guitar to offer players an extended neck that joined the body at the 17th fret, enabling extended playability on the 22 fret neck; a design element that persists in the current day electric guitar. Another key element found on the Electro-Spanish Ken Roberts, was the stock equipped hand-operated “Vib-rola” vibrato device produced by patent holder Clayton Doc Kauffman.

== Historical significance ==
The Rickenbacker Electro-Spanish Ken Roberts was revolutionary for its time. Its design elements set precedence for future electric guitars development in particular Fender and Les Paul who would later utilize the Doc Kauffman vibrola on his early "log" prototypes and personal signature models. The Electro-Spanish Ken Roberts was designed to play standing up vertical with a strap, as practiced in modern electric guitar performance. Concurrently with Rickenbacker's Spanish guitars, Hawaiian "lap-steel" instruments were also produced.

== Historian perspectives ==
Dan Orkin, Director of Content with Reverb.com, stated in 2017: "What makes this guitar special is that it is what most people consider the first modern electric guitar. There's a lot of debate about which was truly the first one of course. This was the popular guitar music of the time. Electric guitars like this, the Spanish style, really took off with jazz and a lot of the big band music of the time. You had the Vib-Rola system, designed by Doc Kauffman, who went on to collaborate with Leo Fender, and a body produced by Harmony, which was another big instrument manufacturer of the time. So this guitar was a really unique piece of guitar history. Only around 50 of these guitars were produced, and six or seven are known to exist today."

In 2014, vintage instrument boutique RetroFret composed a historical evaluation on a surviving Electro-Spanish Ken Roberts guitar. RetroFret stated: "Rickenbacker were the undisputed pioneers in the commercialization of the electric guitar, and the early Ken Roberts electric Spanish model is one of the most important, if relatively unknown, of their early creations. Although mostly forgotten by history, the Ken Roberts represents a fascinating and important step in the evolution of the modern electric guitar."
