= Uhrik =

Uhrik may refer to:

- Milan Uhrík (born 1984), Slovak politician
- Steven Uhrik, American businessman

== Other uses ==
- Uhrik Truckers, soccer team
