= NS6 =

NS6, NS-6, NS.6, NS 6, or, variation, may refer to:

== Places ==
- Sungei Kadut MRT station (station code: NS6), Sungei Kadut, Singapore
- Tada Station (Hyōgo), station code: NS06; Kawanishi, Hyōgo Prefecture, Japan
- Yoshinohara Station (station code: NS06), Kita-ku, Saitama, Japan
- Cape Breton-Richmond (constituency N.S. 06), Nova Scotia, Canada

== Other uses ==
- Blue Origin NS-6, a 2016 October 5 Blue Origin suborbital spaceflight mission for the New Shepard
- RAF N.S. 6, a British NS class airship
- Rickenbacker NS-6, electric guitar; see List of Rickenbacker products
- Netscape 6, webbrowser
- New Penguin Shakespeare volume 6

== See also ==
- NS (disambiguation)
- 6 (disambiguation)
