= Rickenbacker (disambiguation) =

Rickenbacker is a stringed instrument manufacturer.

Rickenbacker may also refer to:

- Eddie Rickenbacker, leading American World War I flying ace, Medal of Honor recipient, head of Eastern Airlines
  - Rickenbacker (car), an early car produced by Eddie Rickenbacker
  - Rickenbacker International Airport, Franklin County, Ohio, named in honor of Eddie Rickenbacker
  - Rickenbacker Air National Guard Base, named in his honor
  - Rickenbacker Field, original name of Dobbins Air Reserve Base, Marietta, Georgia, honoring Rickenbacker
  - Rickenbacker Causeway, Florida, also named for him
- Adolph Rickenbacker, co-founder of the company, cousin of Eddie Rickenbacker
- UNN Rickenbacker, a fictional starship from the 1999 personal computer game System Shock 2
