= Rickenbacker 330 =

American guitar model

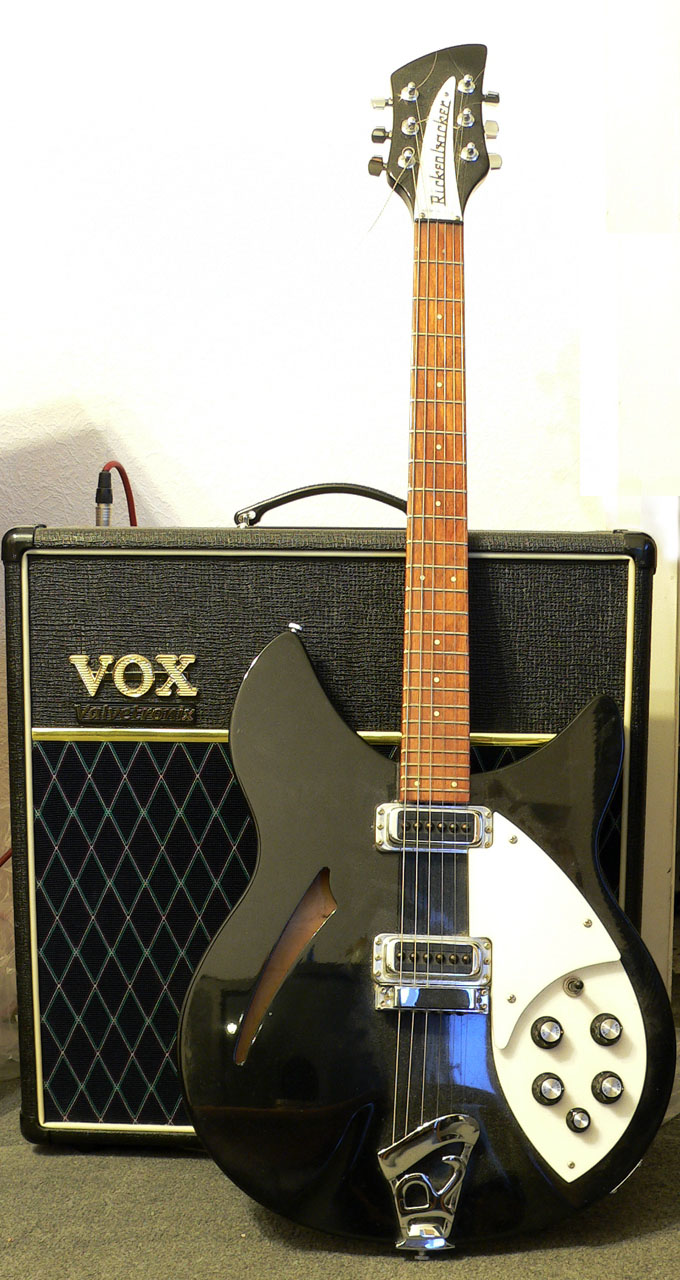
- Jetglo Rickenbacker 330
- Manufacturer: Rickenbacker
- Period: 1958–present

Construction
- Body type: Semi-hollow
- Neck joint: Set
- Scale: 24.75"

Woods
- Body: Maple
- Neck: Three-ply maple/walnut
- Fretboard: Rosewood with pearloid dot inlays

Hardware
- Bridge: Adjustable
- Pickup: 2 single-coil

The Rickenbacker 330 is part of Rickenbacker's 300 series of semi-acoustic guitars, also known as the "Capri" series. The 330 entered the Rickenbacker product line in 1958. It was designed by the German luthier Roger Rossmeisl. The guitar is associated by many players with the jangle-rock sounds of bands from the 1960s and 1980s. The instrument incorporates many features standard on Rickenbacker guitars, including a three-ply maple/walnut neck, a shallow headstock angle, and a thick rosewood fretboard finished with clear conversion varnish. The 330 also features a body with Rickenbacker's "crescent moon" double-cutaway shape with sharp, unbound edges, and an R-shaped trapeze tailpiece. One idiosyncrasy of the guitar is its dual truss rods, which allow for the correction of problematic and unwanted twists, as well as curvature, of the guitar's neck. The 330 is equipped with a monaural jack plate, lacking the Rick-O-Sound stereo functionality of other Rickenbacker models such as the Rickenbacker 360.

The Rickenbacker 330, like all Rickenbacker models, is manufactured in Santa Ana, California. It is not mass-produced, but rather produced-to-order for dealers and individual customers. It carries an MSRP of $1,999.00. The 330 is the top-selling instrument within Rickenbacker's lineup, as stated by former CEO John Hall.

From 1970 to 1974 Rickenbacker offered the 331, which became known as the "Light Show" model. This version had a built-in light organ with an external power supply. The 340 and 340/12, featuring an additional pickup (Model 340, 340/12 12 string version), were previously offered.

During the period where Rose-Morris served as the importer and wholesaler for Rickenbacker in the UK, the 330 was sold as the model 1997, and the 340 was called the 1998. Rather than featuring the standard Rickenbacker slash-shaped sound hole, both guitars featured a standard F-hole.

== Features ==
=== Model specs ===
- Number of frets: 21 (until 1970 and since 2023), 24 (1970 – 2022)
- Scale length: 62.9 cm (24 3/4")
- Neck width at nut: 41.4 mm (1.63")
- Neck width at 12th fret: 49.05 mm (1.931")
- Fingerboard radius: 25.4 cm (10")
- Weight: 3.6 kg (8.0 lbs.)
- Overall length: 100.3 cm (39 1/2")
- Overall width: 38.1 cm (15")
- Overall depth: 38.1 mm (1 1/2")
- Schaller tuning machines

Rickenbacker 330s are optimized for and equipped with 10–46 gauge, compressed, round-wound strings.

=== Pickups ===
Modern 330s are equipped with Rickenbacker's Hi-Gain single-coil pickups. Formerly, the model came equipped with Rickenbacker's "toaster-top" pickups. The Hi-Gains a have noticeably higher output level than the "toasters". The sound of the "toaster" pickups has been associated with such musical acts as the Byrds and the Beatles, while the newer Hi-Gain pickups are more representative of the sound of groups such as the Smiths, R.E.M., and Fugazi.

=== Fifth control knob ===
For each of the 330's two pickups there are two knobs that control tone and volume. However in 1961, a fifth "blend" knob was added to the guitar to expand the possible adjustment of the guitar's tone. Its primary function is to allow for the generally louder neck pickup to be reduced to comparable levels of volume with the bridge pickup. The knob is a potentiometer wired between the neck pickup and its volume knob. Since it is only wired into the neck pickup side and not in the circuit of the bridge pickup, it only affects the volume of the neck pickup in both the neck and middle switch positions and has no effect in the bridge position. The potentiometer value on older models was 500k offering variable resistance from 0 - 500kΩ. More recent productions have a 330k potentiometer which offers a variable resistance from 0 - 330kΩ.

=== Bridge pickup capacitor ===
Vintage Rickenbacker 330s included a 0.0047 μF capacitor between the switch and the volume knob for the bridge/treble pickup, which functioned as a high-pass filter. Some players credit this capacitor for creating the more vintage "jangly" tone as opposed to the much fuller sounding bridge pickup without the capacitor. A side effect of this capacitor was a volume reduction in the bridge pickup's output; this contributed to the need for the fifth control knob. The capacitor was removed from the circuit by the mid-1980s. A popular modification is to reintroduce the capacitor back into the circuit on more modern 330', but it is usually attached to a push/pull potentiometer switch so it can be engaged by pulling up the knob and disengaged by pushing the knob back down.

=== "Paddle" headstock ===
Rickenbacker 330' feature a slim headstock shape, but from a period around 1984 until 2007, they changed the headstock size to a wider shape. Originally, this change was done to accommodate larger tuning keys as the company transitioned in the type of tuners they were using at the time. The headstock remained in place throughout the entirety of the 1990s and was phased out in 2007 due to a large demand for a return to the slimmer headstock style. The large headstock is often referred to as the "paddle" or "Gumby" headstock.

Vintage reissue models were immune to the larger headstock changes and maintained the slimmer headstock style throughout the entire "paddle" period

== Notable players ==
- Kevin Parker of Tame Impala
- Pete Townshend
- Peter Buck of R.E.M.
- Paul Weller of the Jam & the Style Council
- Brix Smith of the Fall
- Johnny Marr of the Smiths
- Wendy Melvoin of Prince and the Revolution
- The Edge of U2 (330/12)
- Remi Matsuo of Glim Spanky
- Peter Banks played a white model 1997 while with Yes (and had the band's logo on the guitar)
- Guy Picciotto of Fugazi
- Joe Hawley of Tally Hall
