= Rickenbacker 300 series =

The Rickenbacker 300 series is a series of semi-acoustic guitars manufactured by the Rickenbacker Company. The series was launched in 1958, shortly after F.C Hall took over Rickenbacker. The guitars were created by Roger Rossmeisl, a German guitar maker.

== Model number and rank ==
The Rickenbacker model numbering system indicates many variables such as scale length, number of pickups, and deluxe features such as binding and inlay. Each subseries has a base model number. If that base model number is increased by 10, the guitar features an additional pickup, a 5 added to the model number signifies the addition of a vibrato, and adding a 1 denotes a model with special features (such as the 331 "Light Show" guitar with internal multicolored lights and translucent plastic top).

There are three main groups in the 300 series:

The 310 group instruments (310 to 325) feature a 20 3/4 in (530 mm) short scale, dot fretboard inlays, and small 12 3/4 in (320 mm) wide bodies. The body is unbound, semi-hollow, and boasts "crescent moon"-style cutaways. Sound holes are present on only some of these guitars. These instruments were originally intended to be student models, but gained prominence due to John Lennon's use of a 325 during the early years of The Beatles. Lennon first heard of Rickenbacker guitars from an early musical hero of his, Jean "Toots" Thielemans. Lennon was able to obtain his first 325 from a Hamburg, Germany music store in 1960. Although accounts differ as to whether the instrument was part of the shop's regular inventory or if Lennon had it specially ordered, George Harrison maintained in an interview with Guitar Player Magazine that Lennon bought it "'on the knocks'—ten percent down, and the rest when they [catch] you!" This series is currently available only in "Vintage" or "C" reissue forms.

The 330 group consists of full scale guitars with standard features. These models (numbers 330 to 345) feature 24 3/4 in (630 mm) scale necks, unbound 15 in (380 mm) wide bodies with Rickenbacker's trademark "slash" sound hole, and pearl dot fretboard inlays.

The deluxe 360 model group, numbers 360 to 375, have hollow bodies with rounded top edges and binding on the back edges, stereo "Rick-O-Sound" output in addition to standard mono output, and large triangular fretboard inlays made from crushed pearl. There are two body styles for these models: the earlier or "old style" which was produced from its introduction to approximately 1964, and the new style, with rounded top edges. The original style shared the body style of the 330, with sharp edges and cutaways, distinguishable only by the front, back and neck binding and triangle inlays. For examples of the different styles, one could see George Harrison of The Beatles, who used an old style 360/12 (which was actually the second of three prototypes) in the movie and on the album A Hard Day's Night, while Roger McGuinn of The Byrds used a new style 360/12 with a factory-added third pickup and onboard compressor.

In addition to the three main groups, there are two other models: The model 350 (now existing only as the reissue models 350V63 and 350/12V63) is a full-scale version of the three-pickup 320 as it would have been produced in 1963 (although the 350 itself was not introduced until much later). This shares all of the same features as the 320, with the exception of scale length.

The model 381 is, in reality, a hollow body archtop guitar and is seen as the flagship of the 300 Series in the form of the model 381V69. Its body style is similar to the 330, but with a Gothic carved top and back providing extra depth. The "1" in the model name signifies pickups, as the 380 was originally intended as an acoustic guitar with electric guitar styling (although the 380 was supplanted by the 381's popularity.) It was most famously used by John Kay of Steppenwolf.

Rickenbacker guitars sold in Europe had traditional f-shaped sound holes until the 1980s. This was at the request of European instrument dealers, who were afraid that buyer response to the non-traditional "slash" sound holes would be poor. An example is the 1996, a (now discontinued) reissue of the export version of the 325.

== Notable Models ==
- Rickenbacker 325
- Rickenbacker 330
- Rickenbacker 330/12
- Rickenbacker 340
- Rickenbacker 340/12
- Rickenbacker 350
- Rickenbacker 360
- Rickenbacker 360/12
- Rickenbacker 370
- Rickenbacker 370/12
- Rickenbacker 380L Laguna (discontinued)
