= Frying Pan (guitar) =

First electric lap steel guitar

Rickenbacker Electro A-22 "Frying Pan"
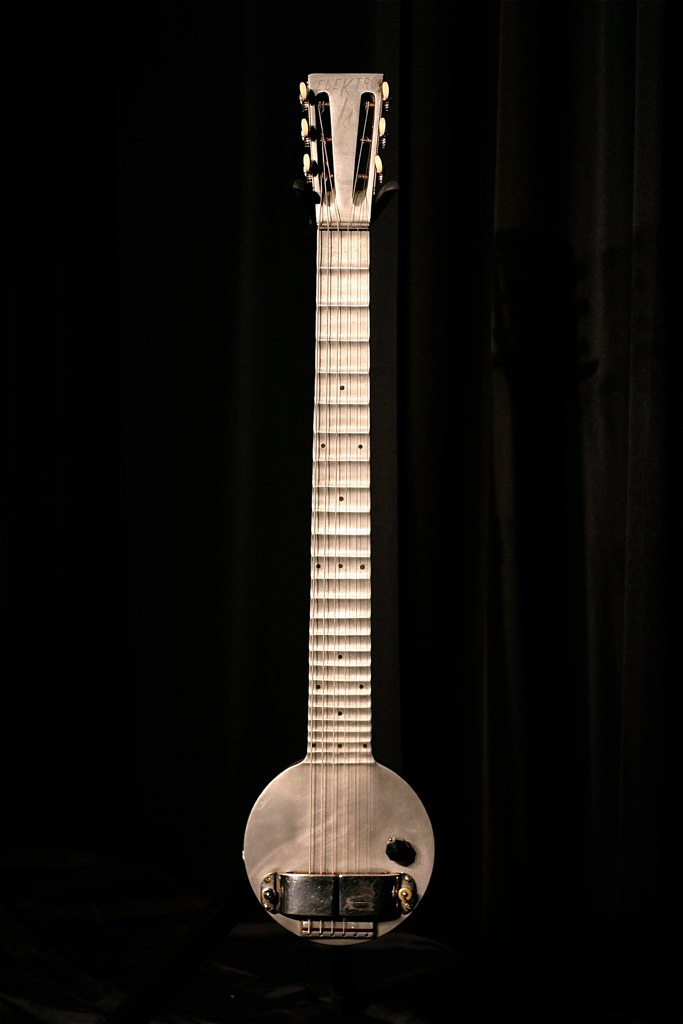
- Manufacturer: Ro-Pat-In Company (later renamed to Rickenbacker)
- Period: 1931/1932 – 1939

Construction
- Body type: Cast aluminum
- Neck joint: Set

Woods
- Body: Cast aluminum
- Neck: Cast aluminum
- Fretboard: Aluminum

Hardware
- Bridge: Aluminum
- Pickup: One Rickenbacker horse-shoe magnet pickup

Colors available
- Bare metal

The Rickenbacker Electro A-22, nicknamed the "Frying Pan", is the first electric lap steel guitar, also widely considered the first commercially successful electric guitar. Developed in 1931/1932, it received its patent in August 1937. A previous attempt, the Stromberg company‘s transducer-based "Stromberg Electro", was introduced in 1928. It used a "vibration-transfer rod" from the instrument's sounding board attached to magnets inside the guitar, and was not successful. George Beauchamp created the "Fry-Pan" in 1931, and it was subsequently manufactured by Electro String Instrument Corporation under the name Electro, later named Rickenbacker. The instrument gained its nickname because its circular body and long neck make it resemble a frying pan.

It was designed to capitalize on the popularity of Hawaiian music in the 1930s. The instrument was made of cast aluminum, and featured a pickup that incorporated a pair of horseshoe magnets that arched over the strings designed by Paul Barth with George Beauchamp. Beauchamp and machinist Adolph Rickenbacker began selling the guitar in 1932, but Beauchamp was not awarded a patent for his idea until 1937, which allowed other guitar companies to produce electric guitars in the same period.

The prototype for the design was made available on display at Harrods starting in 2007.

== Development ==
In the 1930s, Hawaiian music enjoyed widespread popularity in the United States. However, Hawaiian music featured the guitar as the main melodic instrument, and the volume of acoustic guitars was insufficient for large audiences. Beauchamp, an enthusiast and player of Hawaiian music, mounted a magnetic pickup on his acoustic resonator steel guitar to produce an electrical signal that was electronically amplified to drive a loudspeaker, producing a much louder sound. After discovering that his system produced copious amounts of unwanted feedback from sympathetic vibration of the guitar's body, Beauchamp reasoned that acoustic properties were actually undesirable in an electric instrument.

Beauchamp had previously promoted the development of John Dopyera's resonator guitar, and co-founded the National String Instrument Corporation. With National's Paul Barth and Harry Watson, Beauchamp had a prototype electric guitar built. He was acquainted with Adolph Rickenbacker, who owned the machine company that manufactured the aluminum resonators and brass bodies for the National instruments. With Rickenbacker on board and having the needed financing, they began production of a lap steel guitar with a solid aluminum body and neck. Rickenbacker produced the instruments from 1932 to 1939.

== Gallery ==
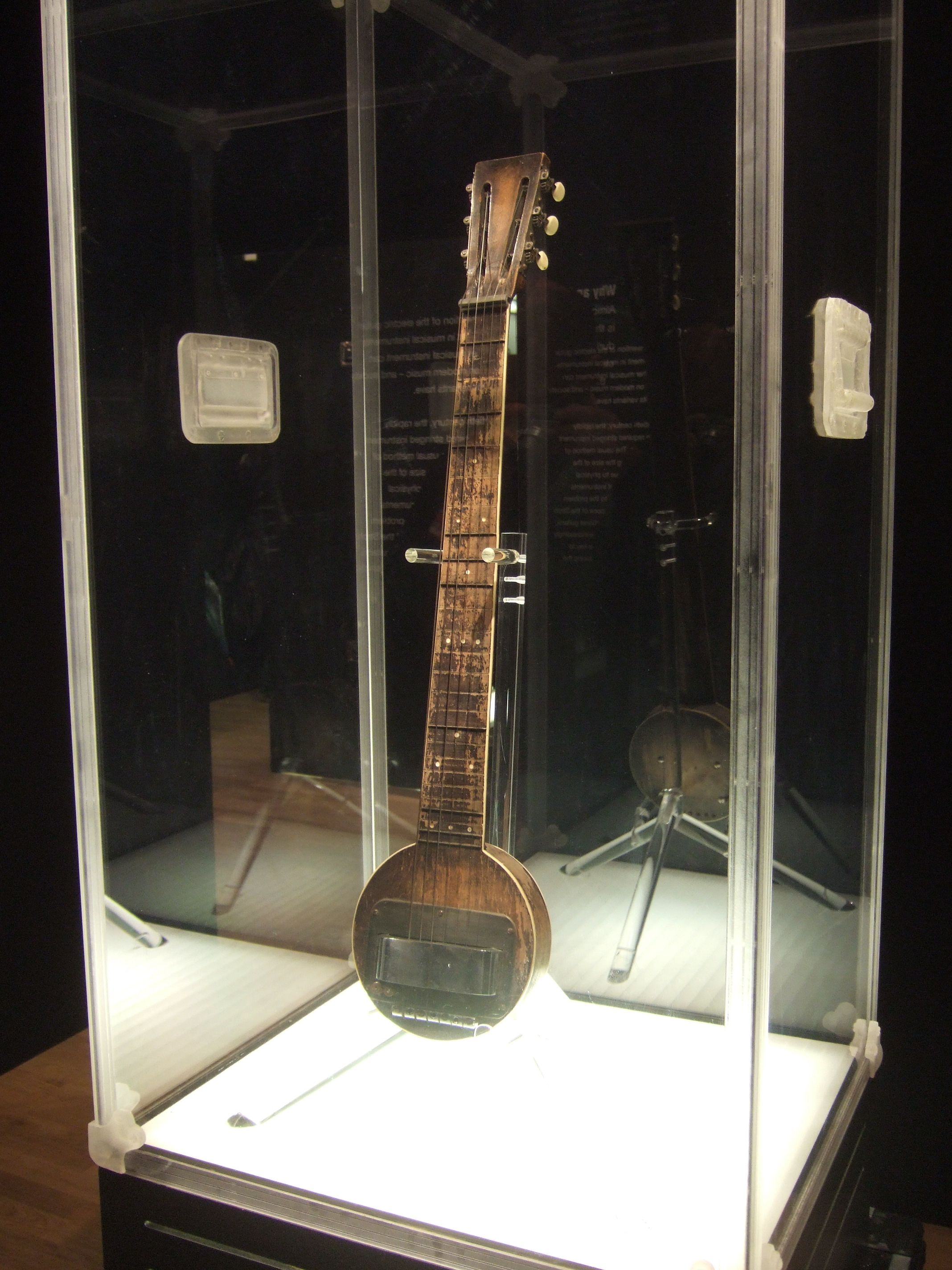
1931 prototype
(one-piece maple,
25" scale, 25 fret)

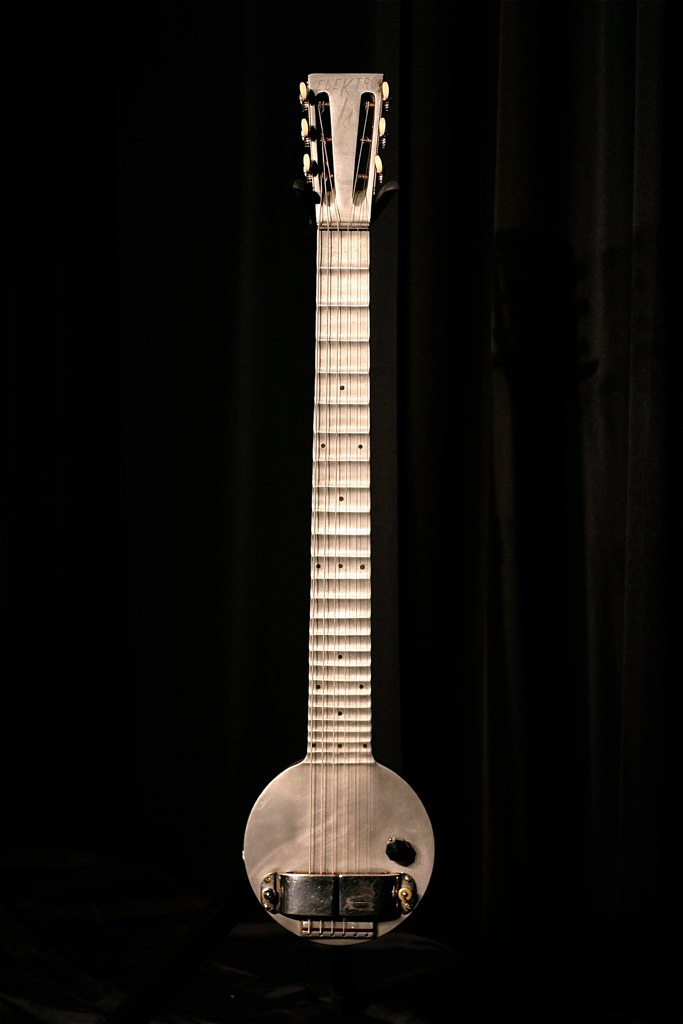
1932 Ro-Pat-In Elektro A25 (one-piece aluminum cast, same size as prototype)

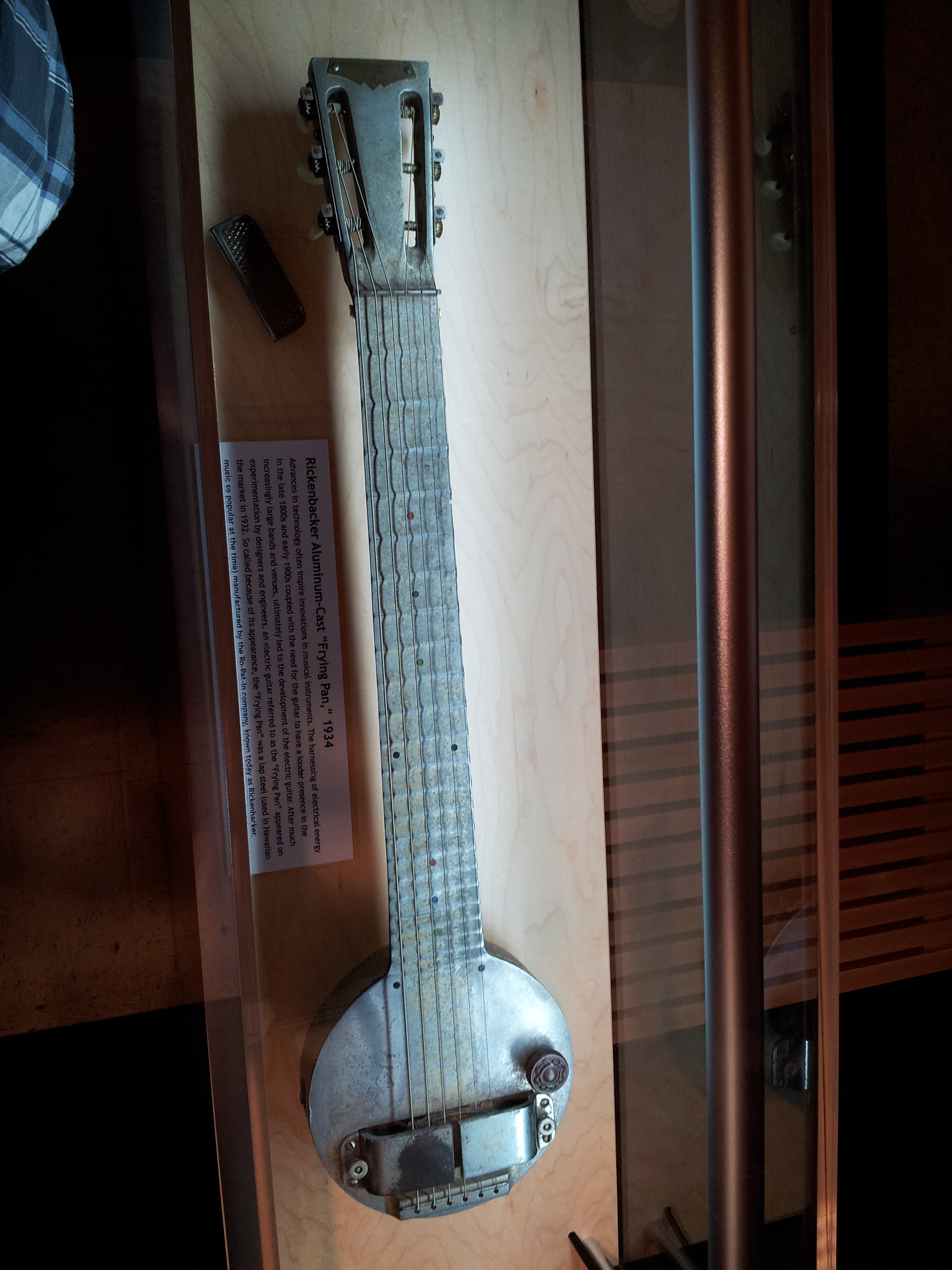
1934 Rickenbacker Electro A22 (22.5" scale, 23 fret)

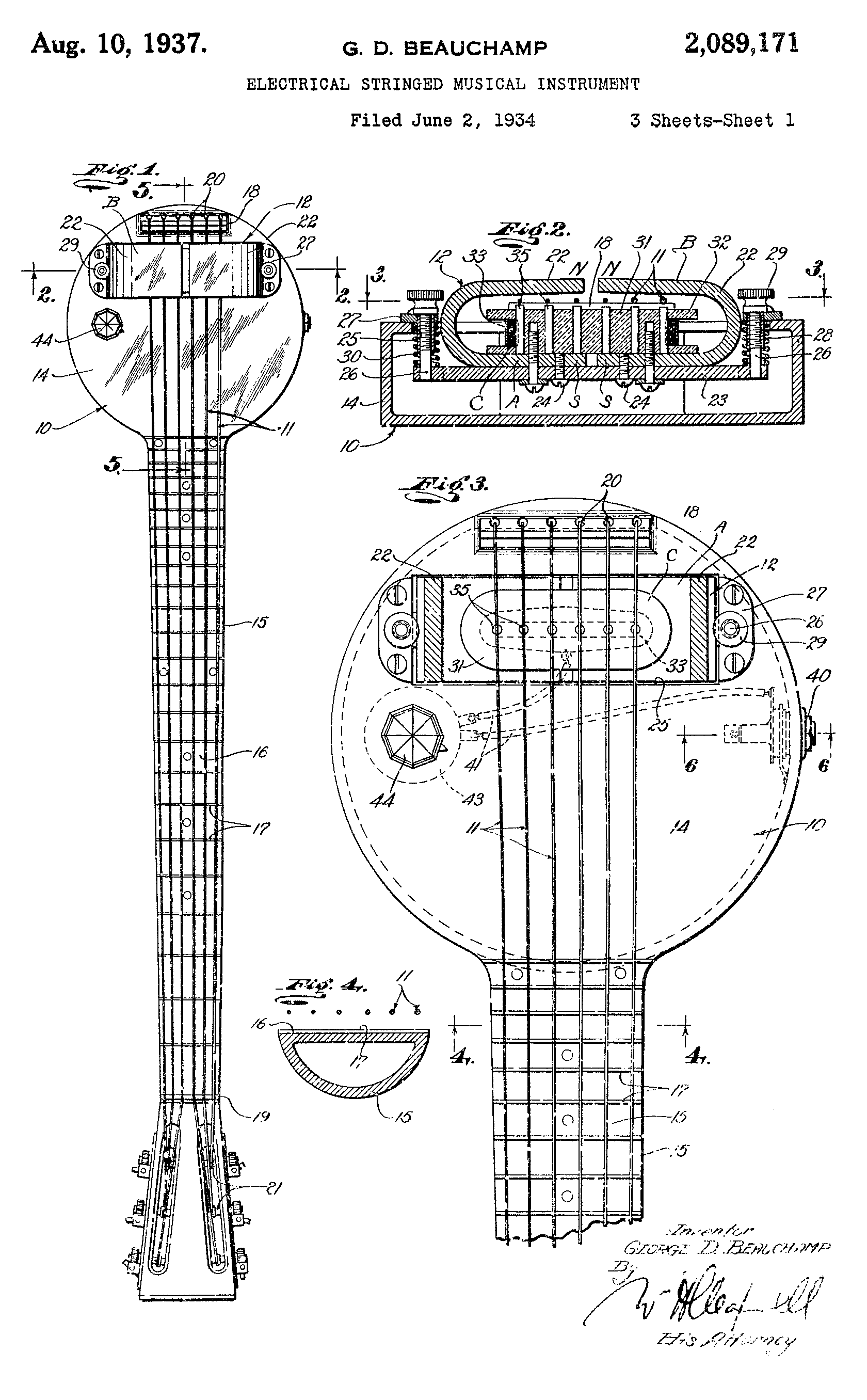
1934 U.S. patent 2,089,171 (filed 1934, issued 1937, 24 fret)
