= Rickenbacker 400 series =

Series of electric guitars

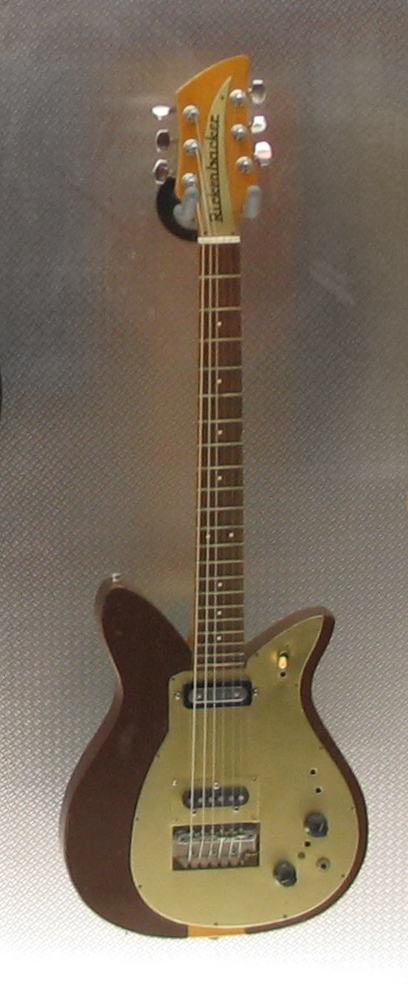
A 1957 Rickenbacker combo 400 with "tulip" style cutaways.

The Rickenbacker 400-Series was a line of lower cost solid body electric guitars that Rickenbacker introduced in 1956.

== Combo 400-450 Series: 1956-1957 ==
The 400 series initially consisted of the single pickup Combo 400 model introduced in 1956, which had distinctive Tulip style cutaways and the pickup at the neck position. In 1957 Rickenbacker unveiled a 2-pickup variant of the Combo 400 named the Combo 450. While the Combo 400 continued to come equipped with a DeArmond pickup, the Combo 450 marked the debut of the famed "toaster" pickup design.

In 1958, Rickenbacker 400-series production waned. The Combo 400 appears to have been phased out entirely before the end of 1957. The Combo 450 continued to be made in 1958 albeit on a very limited basis. 1958 serial-numbered Combo 450 guitars differ from earlier examples for how their bodies feature a transitional concave curve instead of a convex curve where the lower bought meets the neck joint.

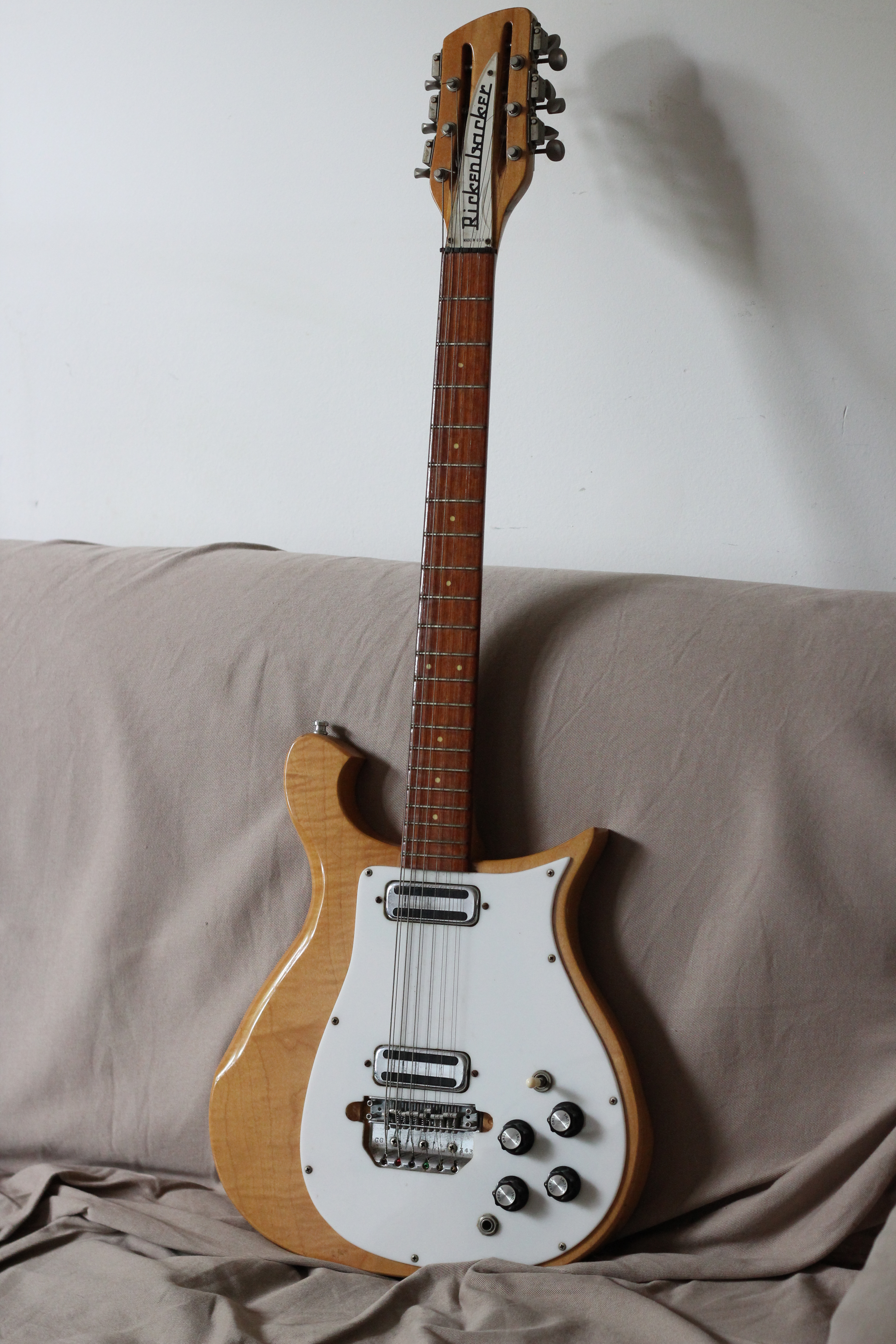
A 1966 Rickenbacker 450 12 string

Jazz Guitarist Jean "Toots" Theilemans was an early user and endorser of Rickenbacker guitars in the 1950s, using a Rickenbacker Combo 400 while playing as part of the George Shearing Quintet; this inspired a young John Lennon, a fan of Toots, to acquire a Rickenbacker for himself (a 325 model) while in Hamburg Germany in the early days of The Beatles.

== Hiatus: Mid-1958 to Late-1959 ==
Rickenbacker serial numbers for solid body guitars made between September 1959 and October 1960 did not contain date code information. Following the completion of a final few Combo 450 guitars in 1958, 400-series production would not resume until circa serial number 4C100, which is ascribed to September 1959. In 1958, the design was updated with the "cresting wave" body design, similar to the higher-end 620 model, the single pickup model had its pickup moved to a central position between the bridge and the neck and was redesignated the 420. A version with a vibrato tailpieces was released as the 425 model. The two pickup 450 version was also upgraded to the new body style.

== 1960s ==
The most famous adopter of a 400-series Rickenbacker guitar remains George Harrison of The Beatles, who in 1963, bought a 1962 Model 425 serial #BH439 while on a trip to the USA. Prior to taking delivery of the instrument, George had its finish changed from Fireglo to Jetglo. George briefly toured with his 425 and is believed to have played it on the studio recording of I Want to Hold Your Hand. Harrison's guitar, which predates the vibrato option, is alternately identified as being both a 425 (as 1962-1963 period Rickenbacker literature denotes his model) and also a 420 (as the non-vibrato variant of the 425 would later be renamed by Rickenbacker.)

By 1964 Rickenbacker had become virtually synonymous with the electric twelve-string guitar. This same year, they introduced the Model 450/12, which was a 12 string version of the Model 450. The Model 456/12 soon followed, which was a Model 450/12 equipped with Rickenbacker's proprietary "converter comb" that allowed for the selection of octave strings to be muted.

== Rickenbacker 400-Series Legacy ==
In 1971 Rickenbacker introduced the more modern 430, (followed by a prototype deluxe 470 model which never saw commercial release) though this line was dropped in 1982. 1973 saw the arrival of the 480, which featured the Rickenbacker "R" style trapeze tailpiece, and an updated body style reminiscent of Rickenbacker's 4000 series of electric bass guitars. The 480 was discontinued in 1984. The 400 series were never as popular as other guitars and basses in Rickenbacker's line, such as the 300 series, and in the 1980s, apart from some vintage reissues of the 450 and 480, were dropped from production.

== Notable users ==
- Kat Bjelland of Babes In Toyland (Model 420)
- Carrie Brownstein of Sleater-Kinney (Model 425)
- George Harrison of The Beatles (1962 Model 425 Serial #BH439)
- Paul Hopfensperger of The Teazers (1974 Model 480)
- Courtney Love of Hole (Model 425)
- Tom Petty of Tom Petty and the Heartbreakers (1964 Electro Model ES17)
- Serge Pizzorno of Kasabian (480 and 481 Models)
- Johnny Ramone of The Ramones (1959 Model 450 & 1966 Model 450)
- Fred 'Sonic' Smith of the MC5 (Model 450/12)
- Robin Zander of Cheap Trick (1959 Model 450)
- multi-instrumentalist Jazz musician Toots Thielemans
