= George Beauchamp =

American inventor

- Born: George Delmetia Beauchamp; March 18, 1899; Coleman County, Texas, United States
- Died: March 20, 1941 (aged 42); Los Angeles, California, United States
- Occupation: Inventor

George Delmetia Beauchamp (/ˈbiːtʃəm/; March 18, 1899 – March 30, 1941) was an American inventor of musical instruments. He is known for designing the first electrically amplified guitar to be marketed commercially, using transducer pickups, which amplified the sound of the guitar and revolutionised music. He was also a founder of National Stringed Instrument Corporation and Rickenbacker (originally Rickenbacher) guitars.

== Biography ==
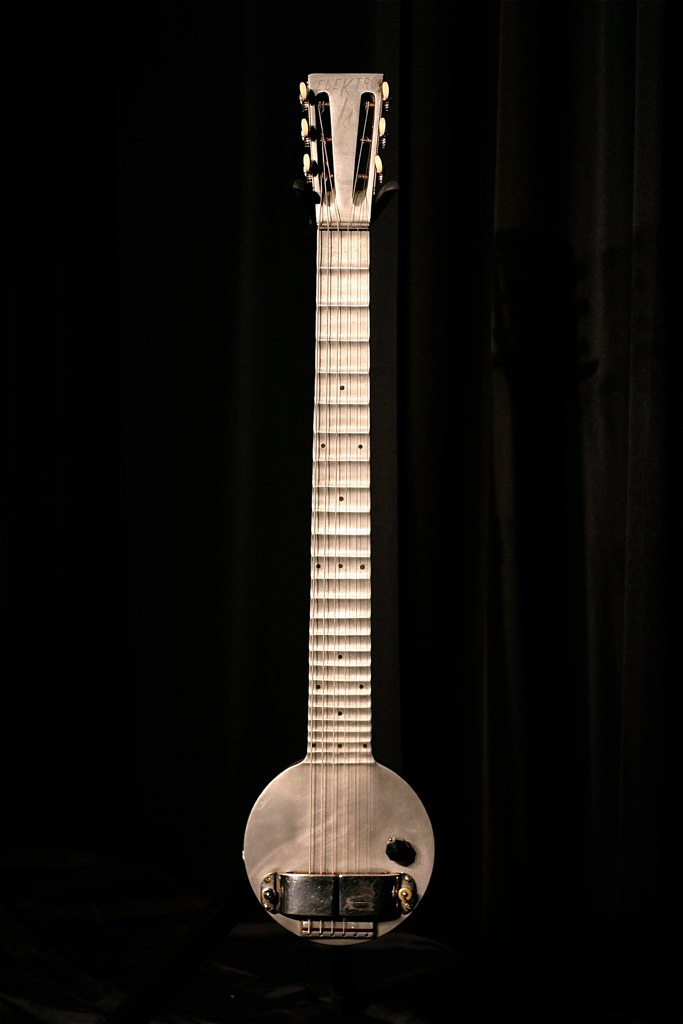
The "Frying Pan", 1932

He was born in Coleman County, Texas, on March 18, 1899. Beauchamp performed in vaudeville, playing the violin and the lap steel guitar, before he settled in Los Angeles, California. During the 1920s, he experimented with the creation of electric lap steel guitars, electric guitars, electric bass guitars, electric violins, and instrument amplifiers. In 1931, he joined with Paul Barth and Adolph Rickenbacker to form the Ro-Pat-In Corporation to produce and sell electrified string instruments. The most notable of these, the Rickenbacher A-22 (and A-25) lapsteel guitar – known as the "frying pan" – is widely regarded as the first mass-produced electric guitar. Production of the instrument began in 1932. In 1937, Beauchamp secured a United States patent for his version of the electric guitar.

Beauchamp married Myrtle Johnston in 1917. They had two children. He died of a heart attack in 1941 while deep sea fishing near Los Angeles.

== Inventions ==
- 1: Patent applied for the single-cone dobro guitar, patent #1,808,756
- 2: Patent applied for metal finger picks (now commonly used for steel guitars and banjos), patent #1,787,136
- 3: Patent applied for the electric lap steel guitar (nicknamed "the frying pan"), patent #2,089,171
- 4: Patent applied for the electric guitar (called the electro Spanish guitar, which was a hollow-body electric guitar), patent #2,152,783
- 5: Patent applied for the electric violin (called the electro violin), patent #2,130,174

Catalogues from the Electro String Instrument Corporation show a range of electric instruments. In 1932, Beauchamp's Ro-Pat-In company marketed the electric lap steel guitar. The electric guitar was supposedly marketed the same year; early catalogues showing the instrument are not dated.
