= Doc Kauffman =

Inventor of the guitar vibrato system

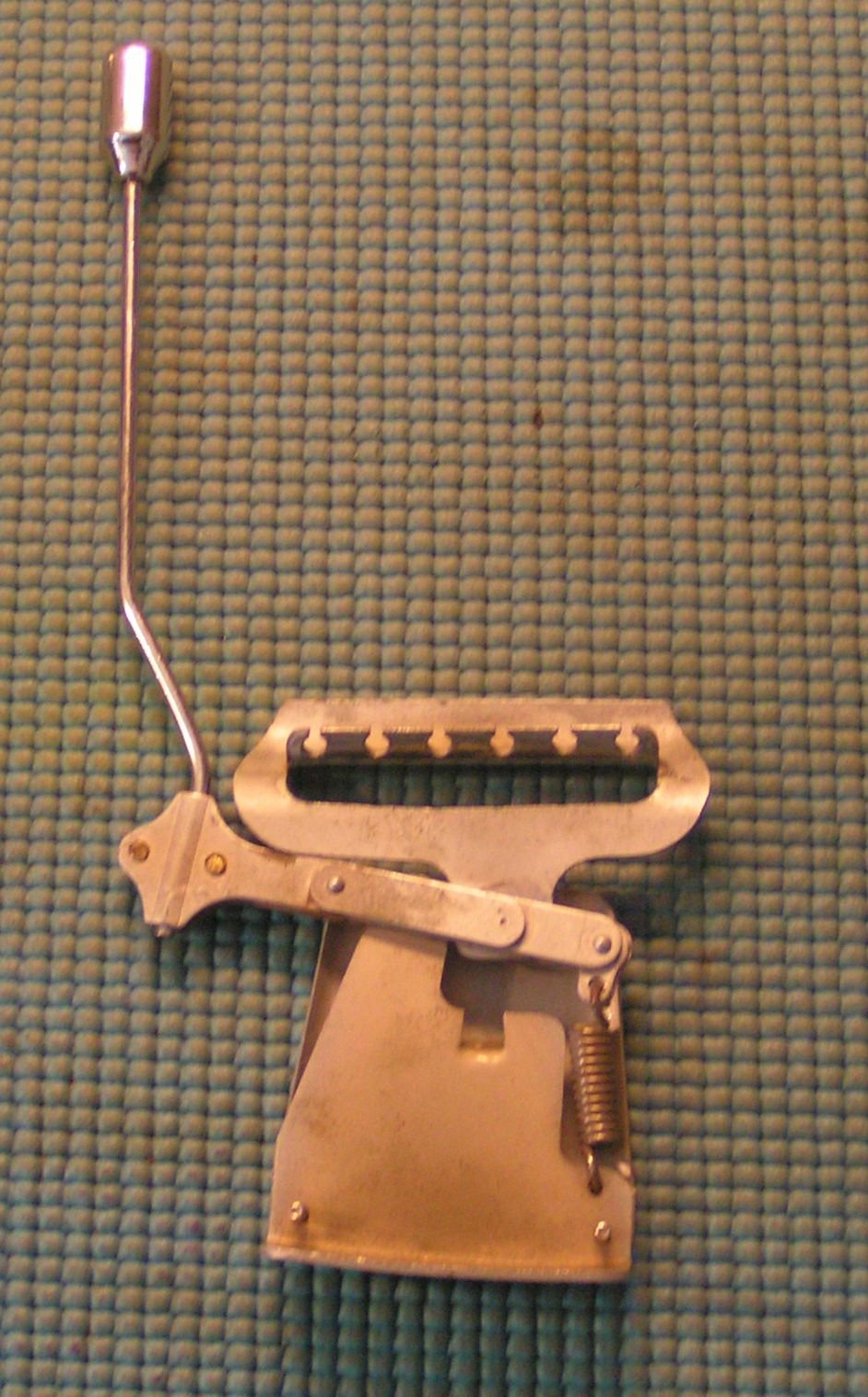
Kauffman Vibrola

Doc Kauffman (born Clayton Orr Kauffman May 4, 1901, died June 26, 1990) was a lap steel guitar, electric guitar engineer, inventor and pioneer of the world's first patented guitar vibrato system. The patent for "Apparatus for producing tremolo effects" was applied for in 1928 and officially granted to Doc Kauffman on January 5, 1932.

== Rickenbacker Legacy ==
During the 1930s, Doc Kauffman served as chief electric guitars designer for Rickenbacker. Having invented and patented the first mechanical vibrato unit, Kauffman adapted it for use on the Electro-Spanish Ken Roberts model as the instrument's standard bridge. This resulted in the first electric guitar produced and sold with a vibrato system as a stock feature. This addition strongly influenced the subsequent development of electric guitars in the 1940s and 1950s – most notably the tailpieces of the Fender Stratocaster and by Bigsby.

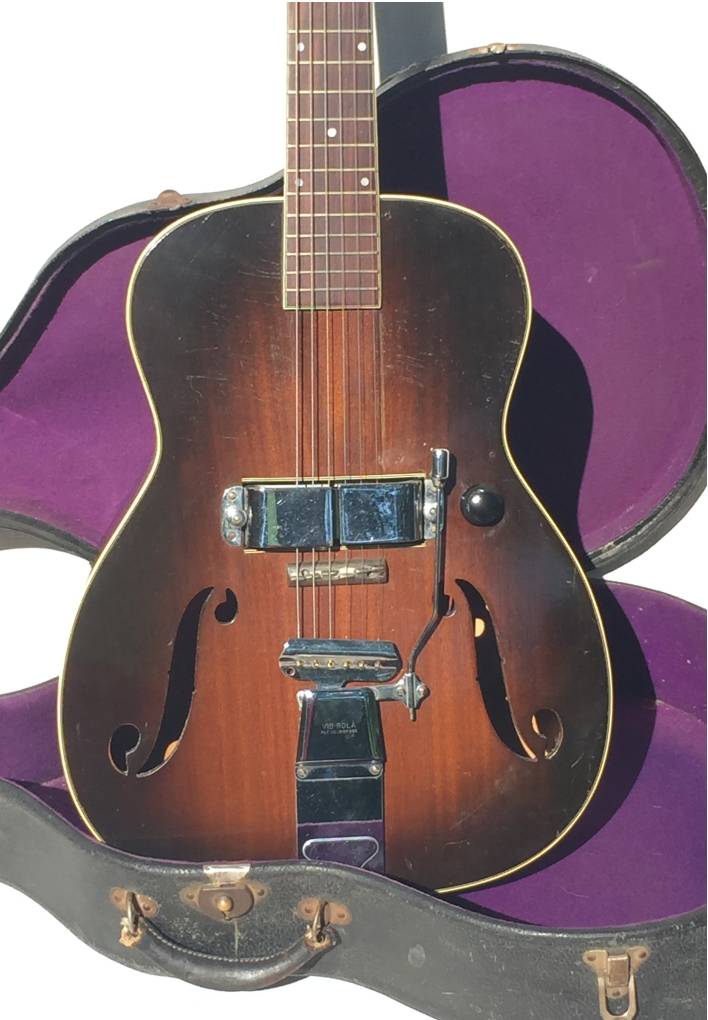
Doc Kauffman Vibrola found on Ken Roberts Model

== Fender Legacy ==
In the early 1940s, Doc Kauffman and Leo Fender would enter a business partnership, forming the K&F company in 1945. K&F only lasted 3 years, having produced amplifiers and lap steel guitars in small quantities. After Kauffman left, K&F was transformed into the Fender Electric Instrument Company. Kauffman and Fender remained friends until Kauffman's death in 1990. Doc Kauffman considered Leo Fender such a close friend, that Leo was listed as next of kin, after Doc's children, in Doc's final will & testament. Leo died just one year after Doc in 1991.

== Les Paul & Gibson ==
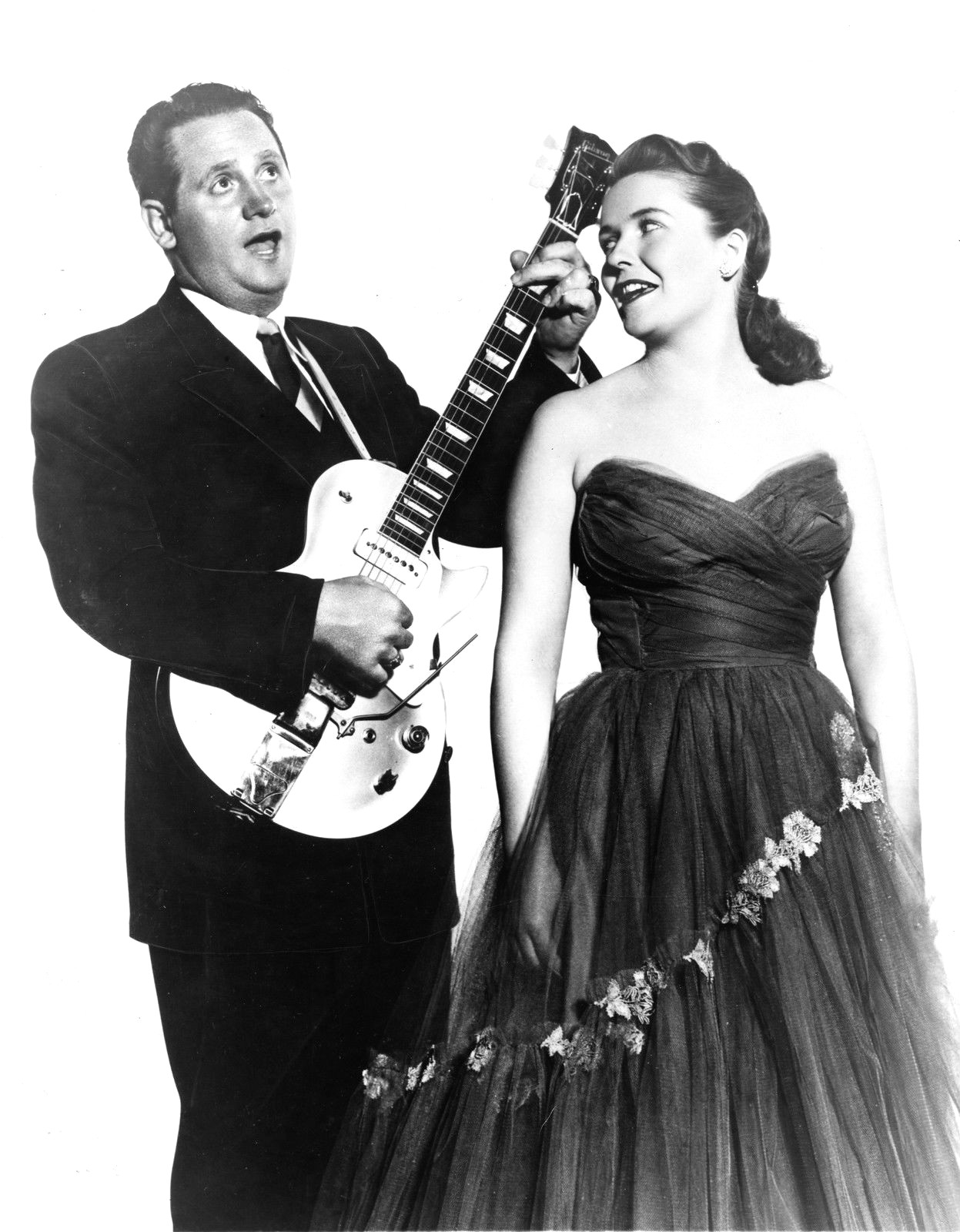
Kauffman Vibrola on Les Paul's early 1950s Les Paul Model

Les Paul and Doc Kauffman struck a friendship in the 1930s. Les would later utilize the Kauffman Vibrola on his prototype "Log" guitars developed in the 1940s. Les favored the Vibrola to such a degree, he removed the stock bridge on his brand-new 1952 signature Gibson model and installed a Vibrola.
