= Rickenbacker 360 =

Semi-acoustic guitar made by Rickenbacker

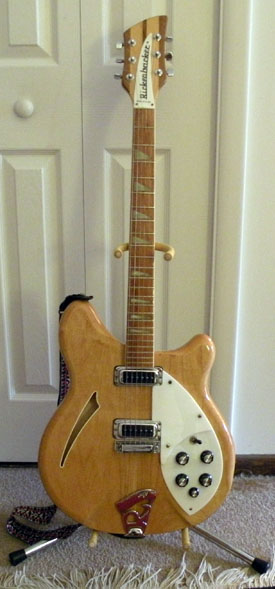
- Manufacturer: Rickenbacker
- Period: 1958–present

Construction
- Body type: Semi-Hollow
- Neck joint: Set

Woods
- Body: Maple Carved, with white plastic binding along the back
- Neck: Three-ply Maple/dyed maple/maple (not walnut)
- Fretboard: Rosewood with pearloid triangle inlays and white plastic binding

Hardware
- Bridge: Adjustable
- Pickup: Two Single-coil pickups

Colors available
- Mapleglo (natural), Fireglo (sunburst), Jetglo (black), Midnight Blue, Ruby

The Rickenbacker 360 is a semi-acoustic guitar made by Rickenbacker, and part of the Rickenbacker 300 Series. The instrument incorporates many features standard on Rickenbacker guitars, including a three-ply maple/walnut neck, shallow headstock angle, a thick rosewood fretboard finished with clear conversion varnish, and double truss rods. The 360 also features stereo or mono output, a body with Rickenbacker's "crescent moon" cutaway shape and rounded top edge and bound back, and an R-shaped trapeze tailpiece. A twelve-string version of the 360 (Rickenbacker 360/12) is available. A three-pickup version of this model is also available, the 370.

George Harrison of The Beatles had been extensively using an earlier style 360/12 (closer resembling the 330/12 model), but retired it immediately from stage performances upon receiving the new style 360/12 (having rounded cutaways and top edge) in August 1965. The first recording by The Beatles of this new model 360/12 can be heard on the song "If I Needed Someone". Roger McGuinn, of The Byrds, played a 12-string Rickenbacker 370. The six-string Rickenbacker 360 model is favoured by artists including R.E.M.'s Peter Buck and Against Me!'s Laura Jane Grace. The 360 was once produced with slanted frets for "a natural finger angle," but negative response led Rickenbacker to switch back to perpendicular frets.
