= Rickenbacker 360/12 =

Model of 12-string electric guitar

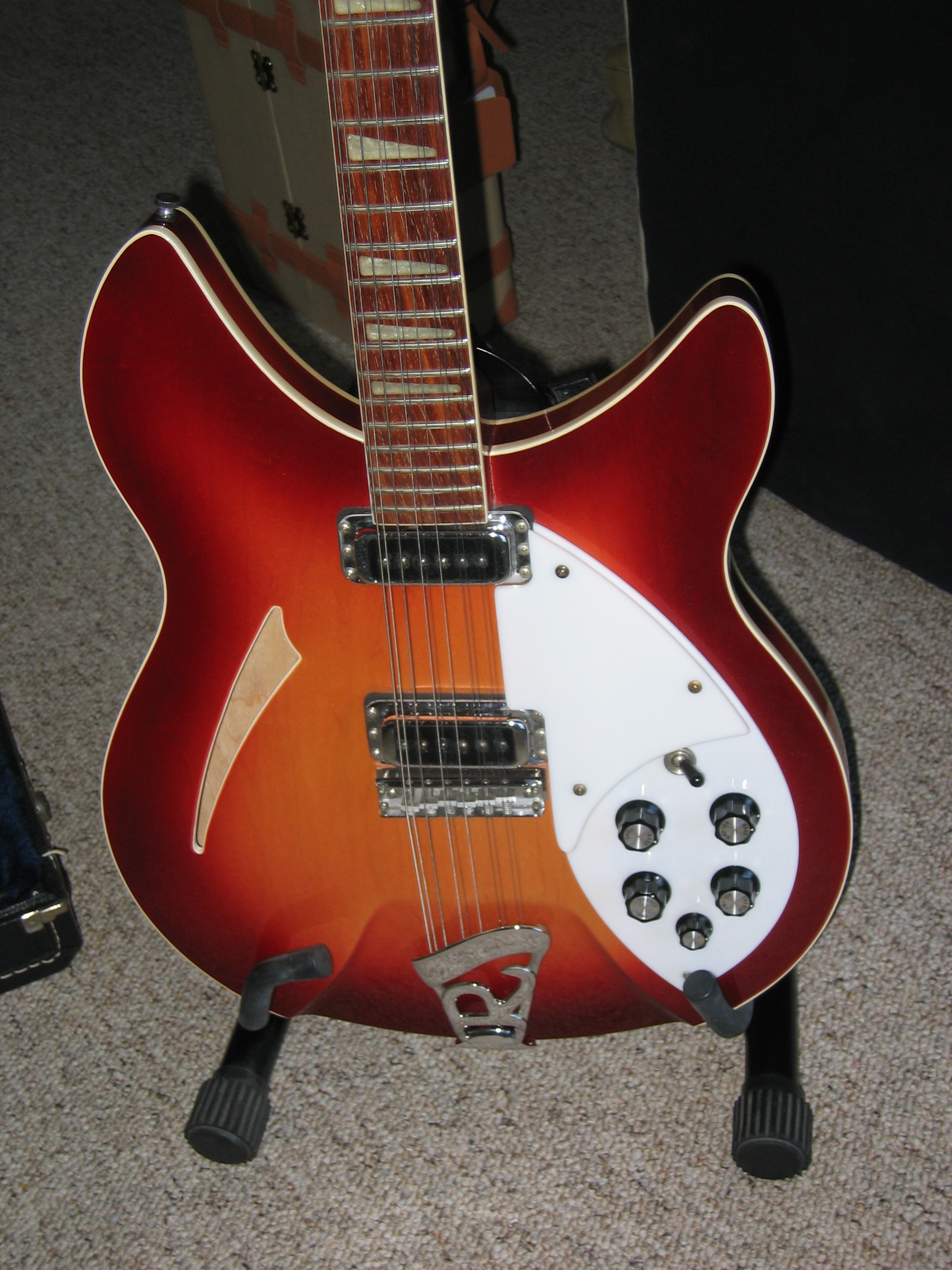
- Manufacturer: Rickenbacker
- Period: 1963–present

Construction
- Body type: Semi-hollow
- Neck joint: Set neck

Woods
- Body: Maple carved, with white plastic binding along the back
- Neck: Three-piece maple
- Fretboard: Rosewood with pearloid triangle inlays and white plastic binding or similarly configured, sealed ebony on custom ordered instruments.

Hardware
- Bridge: Adjustable
- Pickup(s): Two single-coil pickups: nickel–chrome standard, gold and black chrome custom order

Colors available
- Mapleglo (natural), Fireglo (sunburst), Jetglo (black), Midnight Blue, Ruby (Note: Not available all years except by custom order.) (bright red)

The Rickenbacker 360/12 is the Rickenbacker company's 12-string variant of its 360 electric guitar model. Mainly known for producing "jangly" sounds, it was among the first electric 12-string guitars. The 360/12 was given worldwide attention when George Harrison used it on many Beatles recordings, introducing the distinctive new sound of this guitar on "I Call Your Name", which the band recorded in March 1964. In the late 1960s, the company made alternative models such as the Rickenbacker 370/12, which became the favored instrument of Roger McGuinn of the Byrds.

Rickenbacker used an innovative headstock design that incorporates both a slotted-style peghead and a solid peghead, thereby eliminating the need for the larger headstock normally associated with a 12-string guitar. Another feature unique to Rickenbacker 12-strings is the ordering of the courses. Most 12-strings have the octave course on the bass side of the standard course; Rickenbacker reverses this convention. This feature, along with the semi-hollow body design and thru-body neck structure, contribute to its unique timbre.

== Origin ==
Rickenbacker began developing its electric twelve-string in 1963. The folk music revival of the early 1960s witnessed a surge in the popularity of acoustic twelve-string guitars, but the electric variety was still rare. The company created three prototypes, all incorporating the unique headstock design submitted by employee Dick Burke. The design features three tuners on each side mounted as on a standard guitar, with the tuner posts projecting out from the face of the headstock. Two parallel channels are machined into the face of the headstock, reminiscent of the slots in the headstock of a classical guitar, but cut only halfway through the headstock. The headstock routs on 360/12s made after 2005 extend through the headstock, though vintage reissue guitars such as the 360/12C63 remain as before.

Three more tuners are attached to each side of the headstock. The knobs of the tuners project towards the rear of the headstock, and the posts transect the slots in the headstock. The original tuners (machines) were Kluson brand, though after 1982 Grover Rotomatics were used for a time, with Schaller M6 Minis becoming standard in 1985. This innovation minimizes the size of the headstock, and keeps the instrument from feeling "head-heavy" in the player's hands. It is also one of the very few twelve string guitars to use a conventional width six-string neck, making it somewhat more difficult to play cleanly for those with large hands/fingers, as the string courses are much closer together than they would normally be on most twelve string guitars.

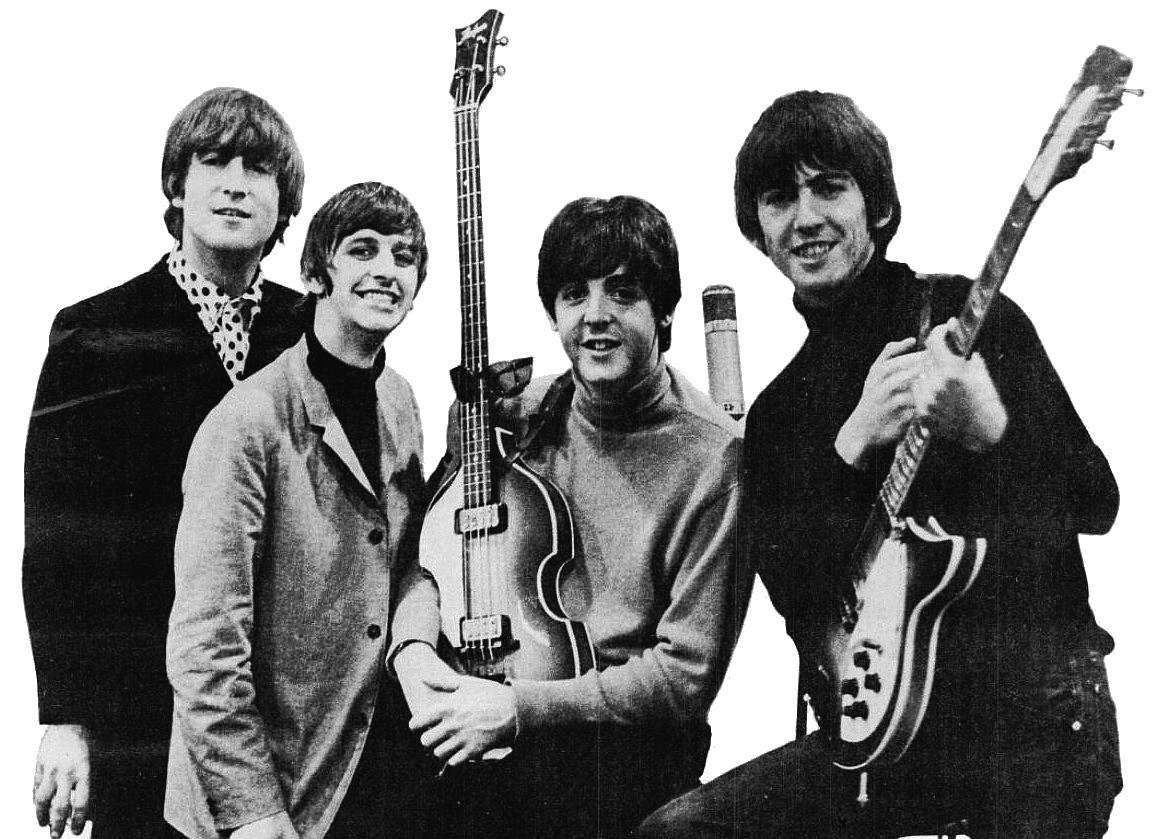
The Beatles in 1964, showing George Harrison with his original-style 1963 Rickenbacker 360/12

Rickenbacker gave the first of these prototypes to Suzi Arden, a Las Vegas country music entertainer. Another prototype was featured at a special display at the Savoy Hilton hotel in New York City in 1964. This display was a showcase for The Beatles, who were in town to play on The Ed Sullivan Show. Despite missing the display due to illness, George Harrison ended up with the twelve-string prototype. His prominent use of the instrument in the film A Hard Day's Night led to high demand for Rickenbacker's twelve-string.

When production began in 1964, Rickenbacker changed some features from those of the prototype. The edge of the body was rounded off around the top of the guitar, and white plastic binding was added to the soundhole. Production models retained the prototypes' use of the rectangular trapeze tailpiece until late 1964, when twelve-string models were fitted with Rickenbacker's "R" tailpiece. The last 360/12 OS was produced in Fireglo and made in December 1968 S/N HL1725.(Ref. R.Smith) After 1969, the 360/12 gained a 24-fret neck instead of the traditional 21-fret neck. Two models were produced: the two-pickup 360/12, and the three-pickup 370/12 (favored by Roger McGuinn of The Byrds).

A notable variant of the 360/12 was the Model 366, that took a standard 360/12 and added a convertible comb device to the body used to clamp the octave strings down against the fretboard, effectively muting them on the fly for obtaining a conventional six-string sound from the same instrument during live performances.

== Notable players ==
- Jeff Buckley
- Glen Campbell used one on his 1965 album The Bandits – The Electric 12 (World Pacific Records, WP-1833)
- Mike Campbell of Tom Petty and the Heartbreakers
- Dave Gregory of XTC
- George Harrison of The Beatles
- Steve Howe of Yes used one on the track "Awaken" on their 1977 album Going for the One
- Paul Kantner of Jefferson Airplane
- Johnny Marr of The Smiths
- Roger McGuinn of The Byrds
- Tom Petty
- Pete Townshend of The Who
- Marty Willson-Piper of The Church
- Carl Wilson of The Beach Boys
