= RetroFret =

Coordinates: 40.678204°N 74.001724°W

RetroFret Vintage Guitars
- Type: Private
- Genre: Musical
- Founded: Brooklyn, New York City
- Founder: Steven Uhrik
- Website: retrofret.com

RetroFret is an American vintage musical instrument boutique and repair shop located in Brooklyn, New York. Founded in 1983 by luthier Steven Uhrik, RetroFret's early business was primarily musical instrument repair services. In the mid-1990s, the business grew into a moderately stocked showroom that served local, international & professional musicians. By the mid-2000s, the showroom had grown vastly, displaying over 200 instruments & musical artifacts from around the world.

== History ==
Founder Steven Uhrik began his career as an apprentice violin restorer and opened his first business called "New York String Service" focused on repairs. The business slowly expanded into RetroFret, a combination service & retail store. RetroFret opened in 1983 in Gowanus, Brooklyn in the defunct headquarters of the American Society for the Prevention of Cruelty to Animals building, which the ASPCA had occupied from 1913 to 1979. In 2018 the business moved to Carroll Gardens, Brooklyn.

== Inventory ==
RetroFret's showroom is considered by many industry professionals to be one of the highest quality, museum-grade inventory displays in the United States. At one point the store had for sale country and honky-tonk musician Lefty Frizzell's 1949 Gibson Bigsby J-200, personalized with "Lefty Frizzell" on the pickguard. The guitar sold for $350,000 to country musician Merle Haggard.
