= Rickenbacker =

American guitar manufacturer

Coordinates: 33.695250°N 117.867835°W

Rickenbacker International Corporation

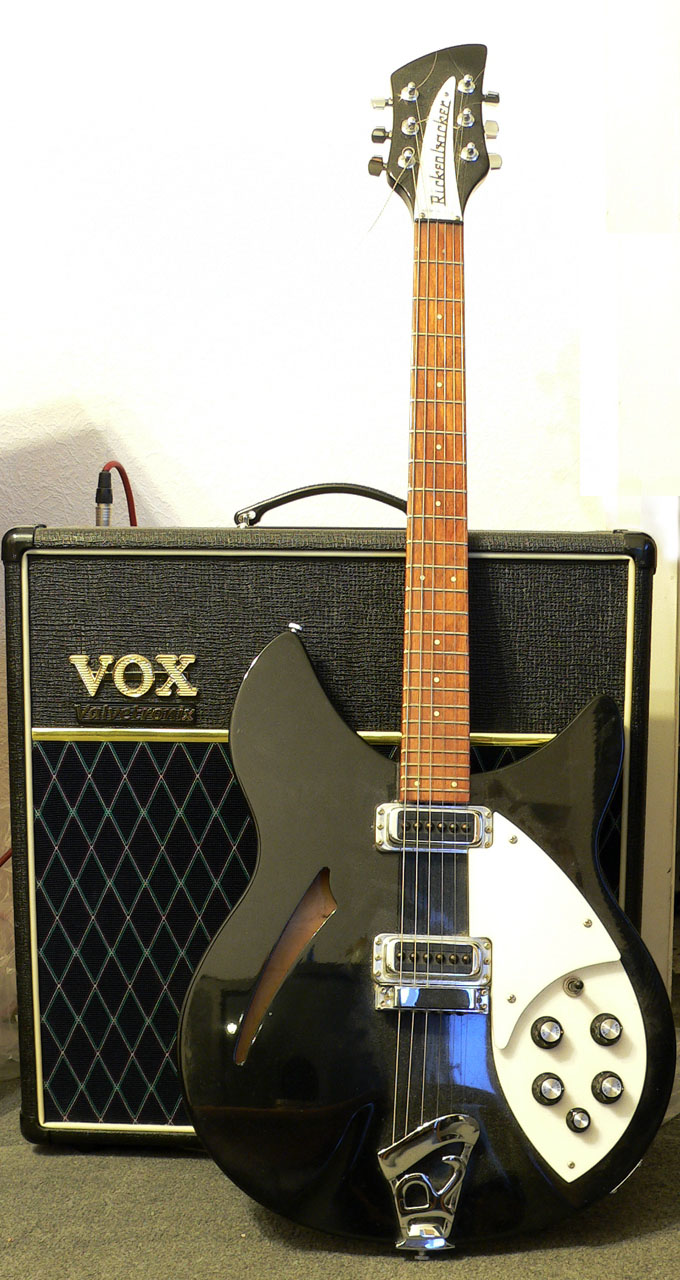
- Rickenbacker 330JG
- Type: Private
- Industry: Musical instruments
- Founded: 1931; 95 years ago
- Founder: Adolph Rickenbacker; George Beauchamp
- Headquarters: Santa Ana, California, United States
- Area served: Worldwide
- Key people: Adolph Rickenbacker; George Beauchamp
- Products: Electric, acoustic, lap and console steel guitars, basses, amplifiers, electric violins, electric mandolins, electric banjos
- Website: www.rickenbacker.com

Rickenbacker International Corporation is a string instrument manufacturer based in Santa Ana, California, United States. Rickenbacker is the first known maker of electric guitars, having introduced an electric lap steel guitar in 1932, and produces a range of electric guitar and bass guitar models.

== History ==
=== Founding ===
Adolph Rickenbacker and George Beauchamp founded the company in 1931 as the Ro-Pat-In Corporation (ElectRo-Patent-Instruments) to sell electric lap steel guitars. Beauchamp designed his instruments in collaboration with Paul Barth and Harry Watson, who had been active in the National String Instrument Corporation. The Ro-Pat-In brand name would eventually transform into the "Rickenbacher" brand, and ultimately the modern 'Rickenbacker’ was adopted. Early examples bear the brand name "Electro" or "Electro String".

The early instruments were nicknamed "Frying Pan" because of their long necks and small circular bodies. They are the first known solid body electric guitars. They had a single pickup with two magnetized steel covers, shaped like horseshoes, that arched over the strings. By the time Rickenbacker ceased producing the "frying pan" in 1939, they had made several thousand units.

Electro String also sold amplifiers to accompany their guitars. A Los Angeles radio manufacturer named Van Nest designed the first Electro String production-model amplifier. Shortly thereafter, design engineer Ralph Robertson refined the amplifiers, and by the 1940s at least four different Rickenbacker models were available. James B. Lansing of the Lansing Manufacturing Company designed the speaker in the Rickenbacker professional model. During the early 1940s, Rickenbacker amps were sometimes repaired by Leo Fender, whose repair shop evolved into the Fender Electric Instrument Manufacturing Company.

=== Early history ===
George Beauchamp was a vaudeville performer, violinist, and steel guitarist who, like many acoustic guitarists in the 1920s, was looking for some way to make his instrument cut through an orchestra. He first conceived of a guitar fitted with a phonograph-like amplifying horn. He approached inventor and violin-maker John Dopyera, who made a prototype that was, by all accounts, a failure. Their next collaboration involved experiments with mounting three conical aluminum resonators into the body of the guitar beneath the bridge. These efforts produced an instrument that so pleased Beauchamp that he told Dopyera that they should go into business to manufacture them. After further refinements, Dopyera applied for a patent on the so-called tri-cone guitar on April 9, 1927. Thereafter, Dopyera and his brothers made the tri-cone guitars in their Los Angeles shop, under the brand name National. On January 26, 1928, the National String Instrument Corporation opened, with a new factory located near a metal-stamping shop owned by Adolph Rickenbacher and staffed by experienced and competent craftsmen. The company made Spanish and Hawaiian style tri-cone guitars as well as four-string tenor guitars, mandolins, and ukuleles.

Adolph Rickenbacher was born in Basel, Switzerland in 1887 and emigrated to the United States to live with relatives after the death of his parents. Sometime after moving to Los Angeles in 1918, he changed his surname to "Rickenbacker". In 1925, Rickenbacker and two partners formed the Rickenbacker Manufacturing Company and incorporated it in 1927. By the time he met George Beauchamp and began manufacturing metal bodies for the "Nationals" being produced by the National String Instruments Corporation, Rickenbacker was a highly skilled production engineer and machinist. Adolph Rickenbacker became a shareholder in National and, with the assistance of his Rickenbacker Manufacturing Company, National boosted production to fifty guitars a day.

Unfortunately, National's line of instruments was not well diversified and, as demand for the expensive and hard-to-manufacture tri-cone guitars began to slip, the company realized that it would need to produce instruments with a lower production cost to remain competitive. Dissatisfaction with what John Dopyera felt was mismanagement led him to resign from National in January 1929. He subsequently formed the Dobro Manufacturing Corporation, later called Dobro Corporation, Ltd, and began to manufacture his own line of resonator-equipped instruments (dobros). Patent infringement disagreements between National and Dobro led to a lawsuit in 1929, with Dobro suing National for $2 million in damages. Problems within National's management, as well as pressure from the deepening Great Depression, led to a production slowdown at National. This ultimately resulted in part of the company's fractured management structure organizing support for George Beauchamp's newest project: development of a fully electric guitar.

By the late twenties, the pursuit of electrified instruments had been accelerating and experimental banjo, violin, and acoustic guitar pickups had been growing works in progress. George Beauchamp had experimented with electric amplification as early as 1925, but his early efforts utilizing microphones, did not produce his desired effects. Beauchamp also pursued constructing a one-string test guitar out of a 2X4 piece of lumber and an electric phonograph pickup. As problems at National became more apparent, Beauchamp's home experiments became more rigorous, and he began to attend night classes in electronics and collaborate with fellow National employee Paul Barth. When they finally developed a prototype electric pickup that met their satisfaction, Beauchamp asked former National shop craftsman Harry Watson to make a wooden neck and body to hold the pickup. Somebody nicknamed it the "fry-pan" because of its shape, though Rickenbacker liked to call it the pancake. The final design Beauchamp and Barth developed was an electric pickup consisting of a pair of horseshoe-shaped magnets that enclosed the pickup coil and completely surrounded the strings.

=== Fry-pan & Electro-Spanish ===
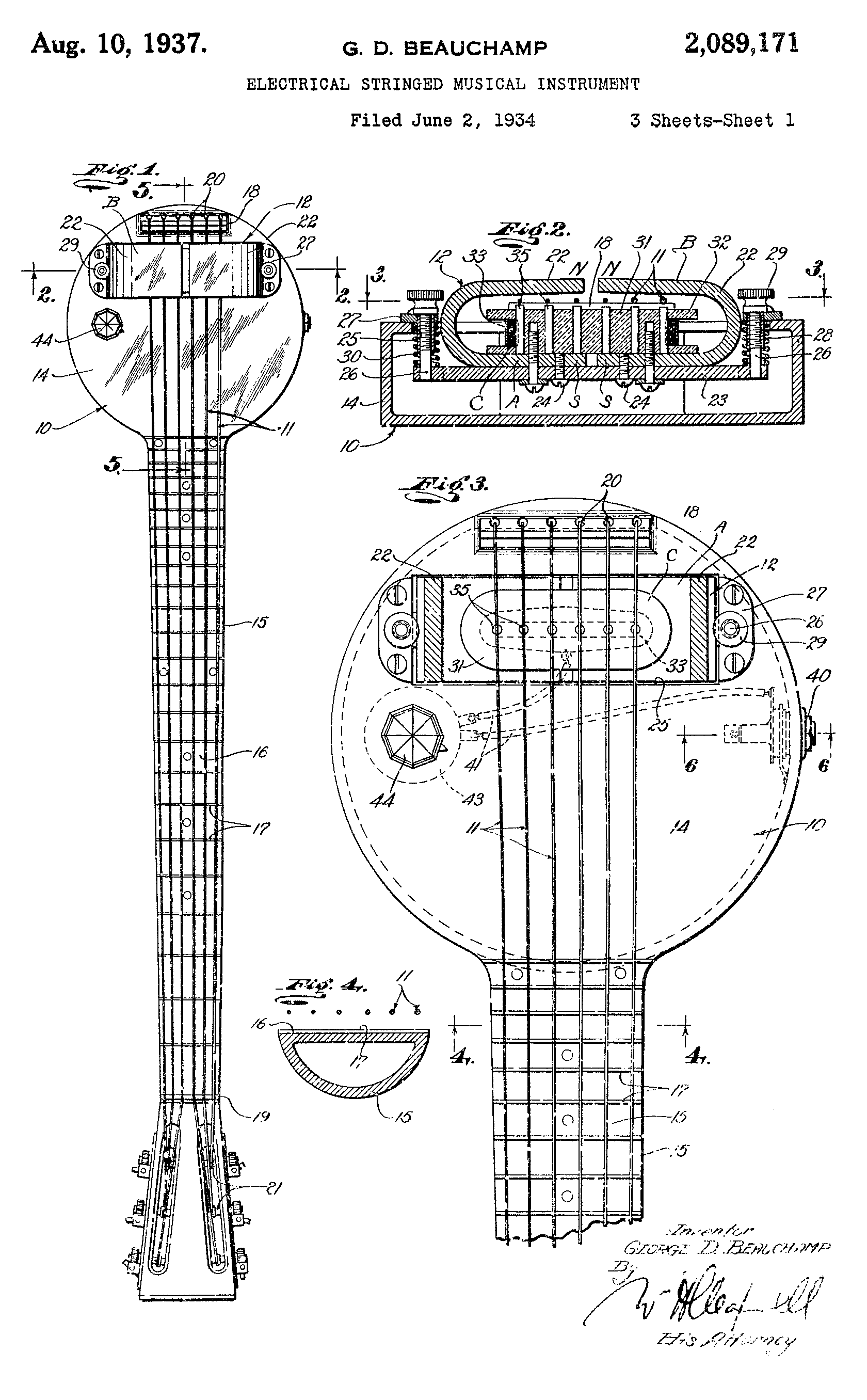
Sketch of Rickenbacker "frying pan" lap steel guitar from 1934 patent application

At the end of 1931, Beauchamp, Barth, Rickenbacker and several other individuals banded together and formed the Ro-Pat-In Corporation (elektRO-PATent-INstruments) to manufacture and distribute electrically amplified musical instruments, with an emphasis on their newly developed A-25 Hawaiian Guitar, often referred to as the "fry-pan" lap-steel electric guitar, as well as an Electric Spanish (standard) model and companion amplifiers. In the summer of 1932, Ro-Pat-In began to manufacture cast aluminum production versions of the Fry-Pan as well as a lesser number of standard Spanish Electrics also known as "Electro-Spanish" models, built from wooden bodies similar to those made in Chicago for the National Company. These instruments constitute the origin of the electric guitar by virtue of their string-driven electro-magnetic pick-ups. In 1933 the Ro-Pat-In company's name was changed to Electro String Instrument Corporation and its instruments were labeled simply as "Electro". In 1934 the name of "Rickenbacker" was added in honor of the company's principal partner, Adolph Rickenbacker.

During the early production of the A-22 Fry-Pan, Beauchamp and Rickenbacker would experiment with wooden-bodied Spanish guitars and solid body prototypes; ultimately giving birth to the Electro-Spanish Model B and the Electro-Spanish Ken Roberts. Both models had been experimental, produced as early as 1931, and officially released in 1935. The Electro-Spanish Ken Roberts model was subject to a limited production of forty-six. There were several new design elements found on the Electro-Spanish Ken Roberts. The instrument was the first of its kind to be named for an endorser. While most arch-top guitars had 14-fret neck joints, the Electro-Spanish Ken Roberts fingerboard joined the body at the 17th fret allowing much greater access to the higher frets, creating a full 25-1/2" inch scale. This addition made the Electro-Spanish Ken Roberts the first production full-scale (25-1/2") electrified guitar.

Another new feature on the Electro-Spanish Ken Roberts is the stock Kauffman Vib-rola tailpiece, the world's first patented tremolo (U.S. patent 2241911A). The Ken Roberts is the first instrument of any type to feature a hand-operated vibrato as standard equipment. It also marks Rickenbacker's first link to the unit's originator, Clayton Doc Kauffman, who would become a design collaborator for the company a couple of years later.

=== Model B Electric ===
In 1935, the company introduced several new models including the Model "B" Electric Spanish guitar, which is the first known solid-body electric guitar. Because the original aluminum Fry-Pans were susceptible to tuning problems from expansion of the metal under hot performing lights, they made many of the new models from cast Bakelite, an early synthetic plastic used in bowling balls.

Rickenbacker continued to specialize in steel guitars well into the 1950s, but with the advent of rock and roll, F.C. Hall, owner of Radio & Television Equipment Co. (Radio-Tel), purchased the Electro String Company from Adolph Rickenbacker in 1953. Hall overhauled the business and began focusing on standard electric and acoustic guitars rather than the steel guitars the company pioneered. In 1956, Rickenbacker introduced two instruments with the "neck through body" construction that became a standard feature of many of the company's products, including the Combo 400 guitar, the model 4000 bass, and, later, the 600 series. Neck Thru consists of a single wooden piece from the neck through the central body section.

In 1958, Hall introduced prototype called "capris" (the same name of Hall family's cat from the pronunciation of the French noun for whim).

In 1963, Rickenbacker developed an electric twelve-string guitar with an innovative headstock design that fit all twelve machine heads onto a standard-length headstock by mounting alternate pairs of machine heads at right-angles to each other. After including the twelve-string guitar in the Rickenbacker 300 Series.

=== Guitars and 1960s rock and roll ===
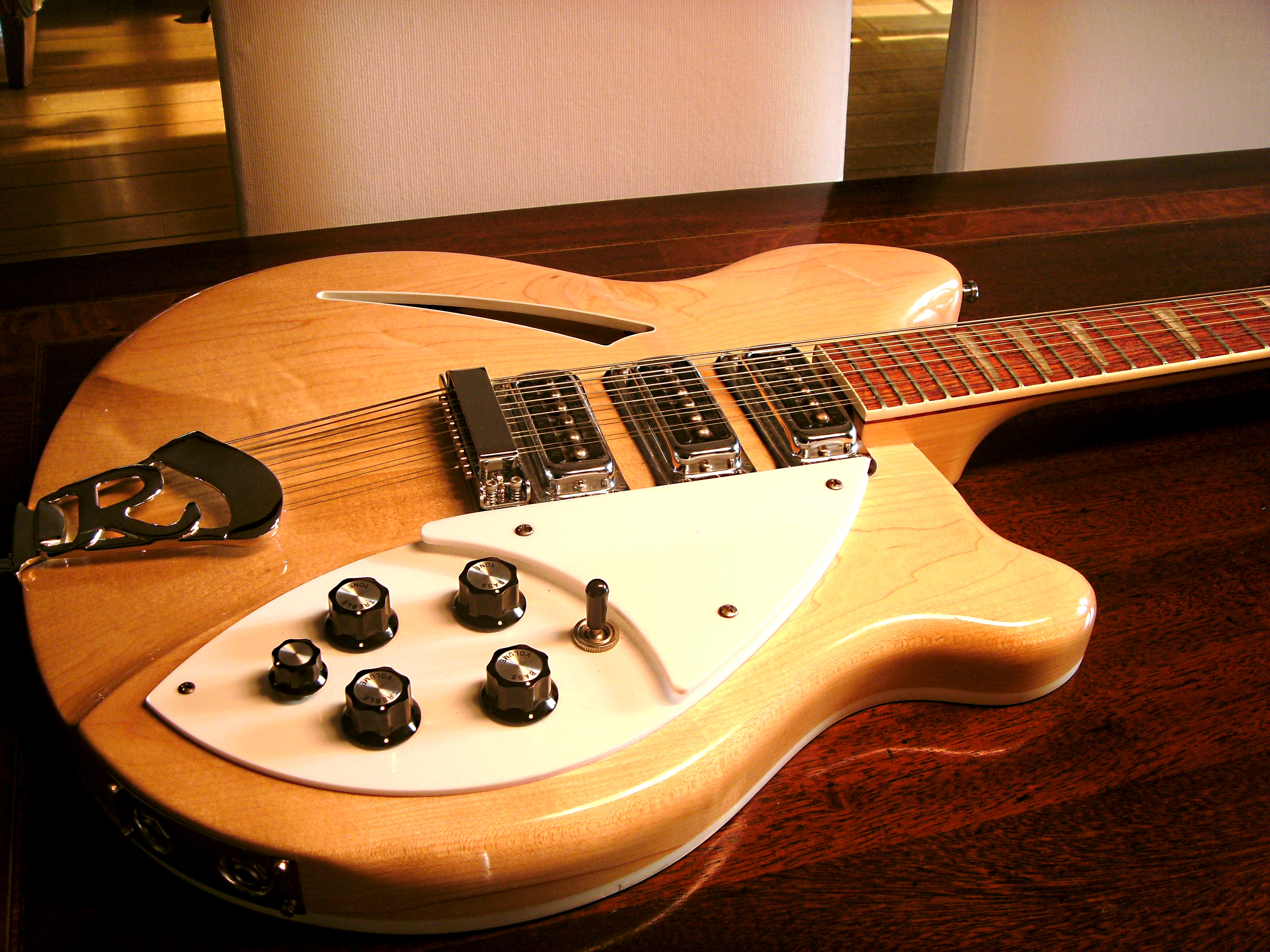
Body of a 370/12, with the distinctive R-tailpiece, sharkfin inlays and stereo jacks

In the 1960s, Rickenbacker benefited tremendously when a couple of Rickenbacker guitar models became permanently intertwined with the sound and look of the Beatles. In Hamburg in 1960, Beatles guitarist John Lennon bought a Rickenbacker 325, which he used throughout the early days of the Beatles. He eventually had the guitar's natural alder body refinished in black and made other modifications, including adding a Bigsby vibrato tailpiece and regularly changing the control knobs. Lennon played this guitar for the Beatles' 1964 debut on The Ed Sullivan Show, as well as for their third Sullivan appearance, pre-taped the same day but broadcast two weeks later. During Lennon's post-Beatles years in New York, he had this guitar restored to its original natural wood finish and the cracked gold pickguard replaced with a white one.

Rickenbacker made two new 325s for Lennon and shipped them to him. At the same time, the Beatles were in Miami Beach, Florida, on the same 1964 visit to the United States: a one-off custom 12-string 325 model and an updated six-string model with modified electronics and vibrato. He used this newer six-string model on the Beatles' second appearance on The Ed Sullivan Show.

Lennon accidentally dropped the second 325 model during a 1964 Christmas show, breaking the headstock. While it was being repaired, Rickenbacker's UK distributor Rose Morris gave Lennon a model 1966 (the export version of a 325, available exclusively in a red finish and with an F-hole). Lennon later gave the 1966 to fellow Beatle Ringo Starr.

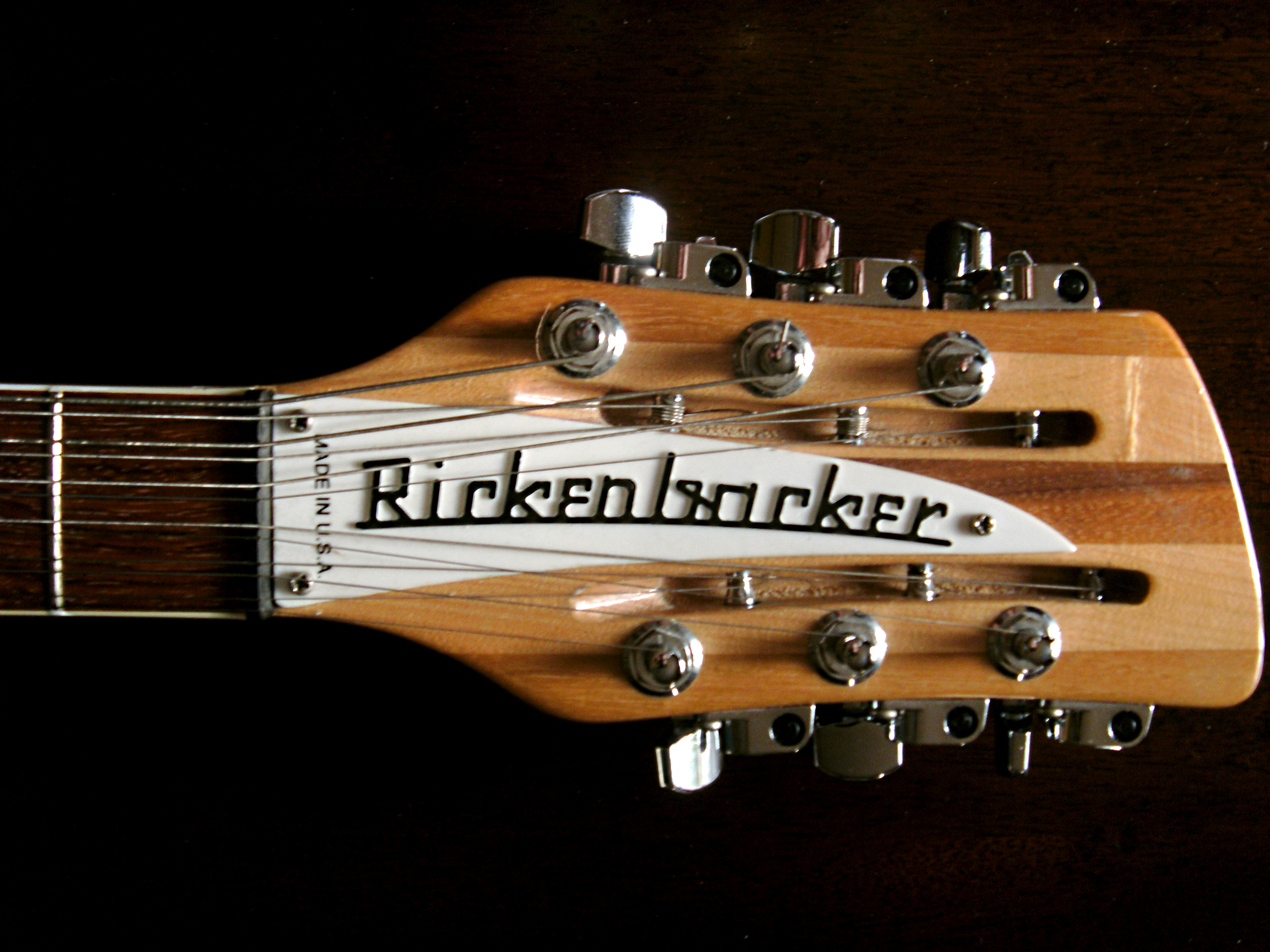
The typical 12-string headstock, with the slotted tuners for the octave strings

Beatles guitarist George Harrison bought a 420 during a brief visit to the United States in 1963. In February 1964, while in New York City, F.C. Hall of Rickenbacker met with the band and their manager and gave Harrison a 360/12, the second electric twelve-string built by Rickenbacker. This instrument became a key part of the Beatles' sound on their LP A Hard Day's Night and other Beatles songs through late 1964. Harrison played this guitar sporadically throughout the remainder of his life.

On August 21, 1965, during a Beatles concert tour, Randy Resnick of B-Sharp, a Minnesota music store, presented Harrison with a second model 360/12 FG "New Style" 12-string electric guitar, distinguishable from Harrison's first 12-string by its rounded cutaways and edges. A television documentary produced by KSTP-TV in Minneapolis documents the event. Harrison used this guitar on the song "If I Needed Someone" and during the Beatles' 1966 tours. This 12-string's whereabouts are unknown, as it was stolen at some point after the band ceased touring.

After the Beatles' 1965 summer tour, Paul McCartney frequently used a left-handed 1964 4001S FG Rickenbacker bass rather than the lightweight Höfner basses he had used previously. The instrument gained popularity among other bassists influenced by McCartney's highly melodic style.

In 1967, McCartney gave his 4001 a psychedelic paint job, as seen in the promo film for "Hello, Goodbye" and in the Magical Mystery Tour film. A year or so later, someone sanded off the finish. A second, over-zealous sanding in the early 1970s removed the "points" of the bass's cutaways. McCartney used the Rickenbacker bass during his time with Wings and through his solo career. He continues to record with it to this day.

Partly because of the Beatles' popularity and their consistent use of the Rickenbacker brand, many guitarists adopted them, including John Fogerty (Creedence Clearwater Revival), Paul Kantner (Jefferson Airplane), and John Entwistle and Pete Townshend of the Who. As both the British Invasion and the 1960s wound down, Rickenbacker guitars fell out of fashion for a time. Rickenbacker basses, however, remained popular through the 1970s and beyond. In the late 1970s and early 1980s, Rickenbacker guitars experienced a renaissance as new wave and jangle pop groups turned to them for their distinctive chime. Demand is particularly high among retro groups influenced by the sound and look of the 1960s.

In 1971, Rickenbacker offered its 331LS Lightshow model and matching bass (model 4005LS), which contained a three-channel light organ with a dimmer. Each channel corresponded to the pitch of the strings being played. The soundboard on these models was replaced with thin Plexiglas cutouts over a translucent moire diffraction material.

== Hallmarks of Rickenbackers ==
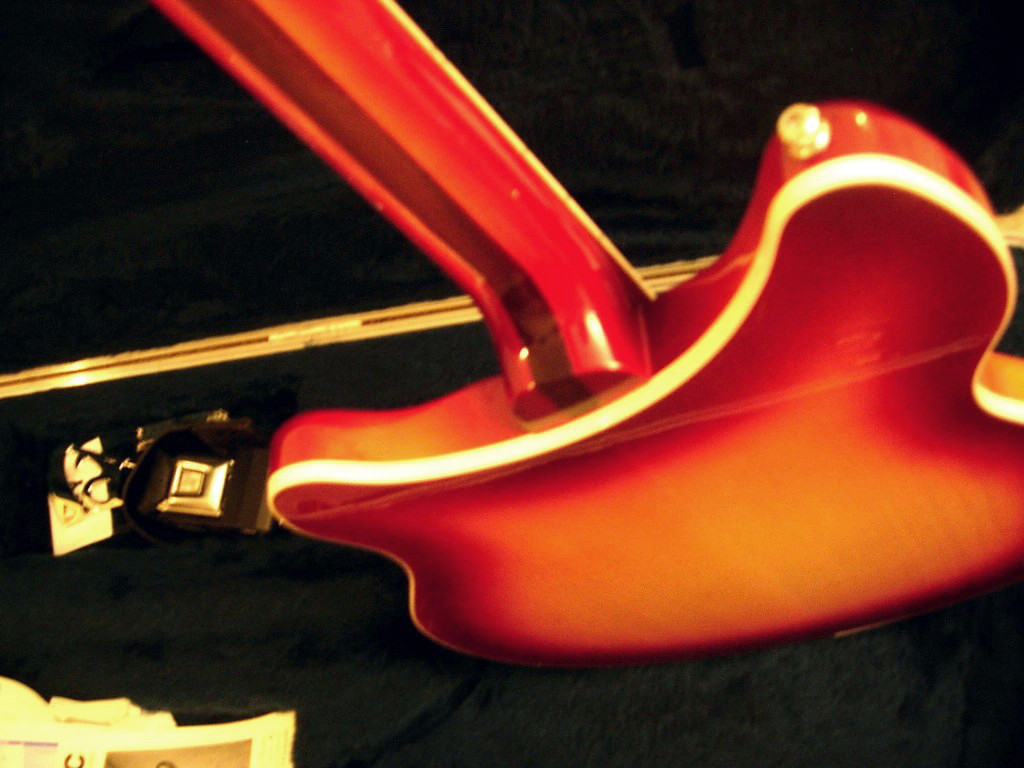
Double truss rod neck

Some Rickenbacker models feature a stereo "Rick-O-Sound" output socket, allowing each pickup to be routed to different amplifiers or effects chains. Another feature is the use of two truss rods to correct twists and curvature in the neck. Rickenbacker guitars typically have a set neck made of multiple pieces of wood laminated together lengthwise, while their basses have a one-piece neck that extends through the entire body. Rickenbacker instruments are known for narrower necks (41.4 mm versus 43 mm at the nut for most competitors) and lacquered rosewood fingerboards, giving them a different feel.

Known for their bright jangle and chime, early Rickenbacker guitars were often favored by folk rock, and British Invasion bands such as the Searchers, the Beatles and the Who. The early models were equipped with low-output toaster pickups. With the late-1960s advent of heavy rock, these were phased out circa 1969–70, and replaced by high-gain pickups with twice the output. Still, the early models were viewed by Pete Townshend as pivotal in his refinement of feedback techniques and the eventual development of the Marshall sound.

Since the 1960s, a diverse cross-section of artists have played Rickenbacker guitars. In 1979, Tom Petty and Mike Campbell of Tom Petty and the Heartbreakers used vintage 1960s models to attain that toaster-pickup jangle. The high-gain pickup sound is associated with acts such as the Jam and R.E.M.

== Basses ==
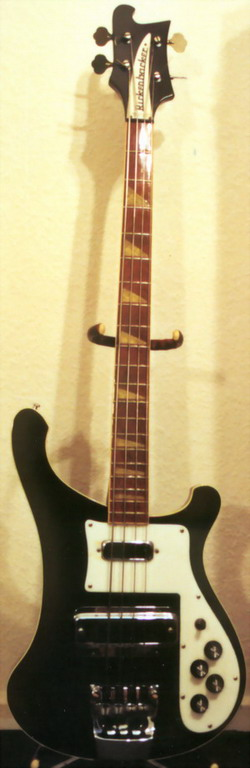
Rickenbacker 4001JG

The 4000 series were the first Rickenbacker bass guitars, introduced in 1957. They followed the 4000 with the 4001 (in 1961), 4002 (limited edition bass introduced in 1977), 4008 (an eight-string model introduced in the mid-1970s), 4003 (in 1979, replacing the 4001 entirely in 1986 and still in production in 2024), and most recently the 4004 series. They also made the 4005, a hollow-bodied bass guitar (from 1965 to 1984)—which did not resemble other 4000 series basses, but rather the new style 360-370 guitars. The 4001S (introduced 1964) was basically a 4001 but with no binding and dot fingerboard inlays. It was exported to England as the RM1999. However, Paul McCartney received one of the early 4001S instruments (his unit was left-handed, and later modified to include a zero fret). Along with McCartney, other early adopters of the 4001 were Roger Waters of Pink Floyd, John Entwistle of the Who, Pete Quaife of the Kinks, Chris Squire of Yes (who technically used the RM1999 British import) and Geddy Lee of Rush.

The model 4003S ("standard") arrived in 1985, was discontinued in 2000, and relaunched in 2015. This was similar to the 4001S with its dot neck markers and no binding. From 1985 to 2002, the 4003 and 4003S had black hardware and black binding options available. Later special editions included the 4003 Blue Boy, 4003 CS (Chris Squire), Blackstar, Shadow Bass, Tuxedo and 4003 Redneck.

Rickenbacker basses have a distinctive tone. The 4001 and 4003 basses have neck-through construction. The 3000 series, made from the mid-1970s to mid-1980s, were cheaper instruments with bolt-on 21-fret necks. There was also a glued-in "set neck" 4000 version in 1975–1976 (neck set like a Gibson Les Paul), which featured a 20-fret neck, dot inlays, no binding (similar to the 4001S) and only a single bridge-position mono pickup. Fred Turner of Bachman-Turner Overdrive used the 4000 extensively on the Not Fragile album, as seen in a promotional clip for "You Ain't Seen Nothing Yet." This bass also appears on the gatefold sleeve of Four Wheel Drive.

In the 1970s, the Rickenbacker bass became a staple of progressive rock, as exemplified by British bassists Mike Rutherford (Genesis) and Chris Squire (Yes). Squire was one of the first to run a Rickenbacker in stereo by splitting the signal, sending the signal through both a guitar amp and a bass amp. Combined with his aggressive picking technique on Rotosound roundwound strings, the effect was a growling, grinding, "concrete mixer" tone that continues to be admired and emulated.

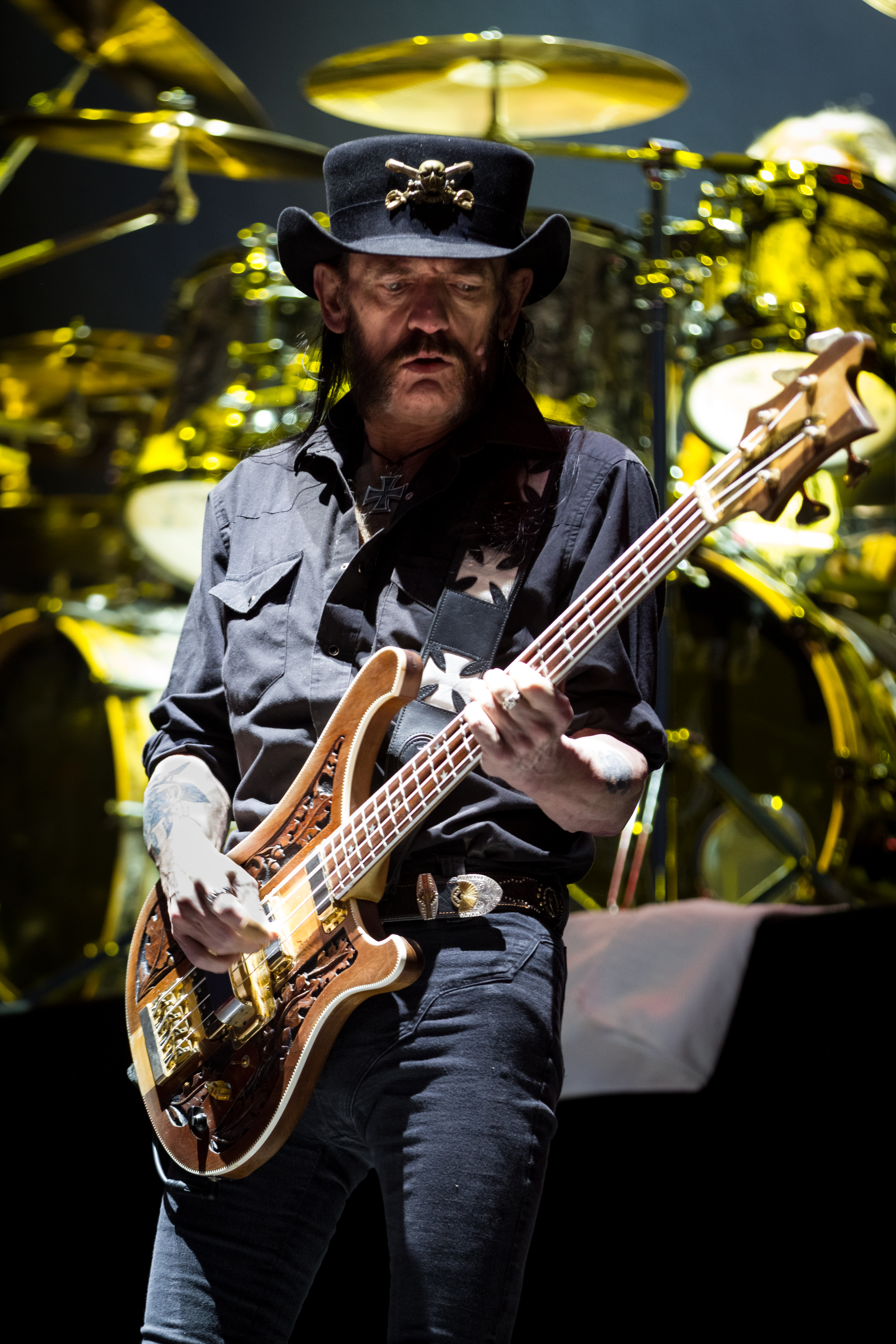
Lemmy Kilmister playing his signature 4004LK

In the hard rock vein, Deep Purple's Roger Glover was a prominent Rickenbacker aficionado. Geddy Lee of Rush used a Rickenbacker on the band's earlier material. Another enthusiast was Metallica bassist Cliff Burton, whose heavily modified 4001, red with white hardware and trim, debuted during the group's Kill 'Em All era. Also noteworthy was Motörhead vocalist/bassist Ian "Lemmy" Kilmister, for whom Rickenbacker produced a 60-bass run of "Lemmy Kilmister" signature basses: the 4004LK, fitted with three pickups, gold hardware, and elaborate wood carving in the shape of oak leaves. In 2019, the company produced a 420-bass run of Al Cisneros signature basses honoring the prominent Sleep and Om bassist, a long-time Rickenbacker proponent. Cisneros's 4003AC model features a signature pickguard, green inlays on the fingerboard, and a removable thumb rest.

The sound of Rickenbacker basses featured early on in the UK punk/new wave explosion of the late 1970s and early 80s and was used by: Glen Matlock (Sex Pistols), Paul Simonon (the Clash), Peter Hook (Joy Division), Bruce Foxton (the Jam), Paul Gray (the Damned, Eddie & the Hot Rods), Tony James (Generation X), Michael Bradley (the Undertones), Youth (Killing Joke) and in the U.S., Mike Mills (R.E.M.) and Kira Roessler (Black Flag).

Brazilian bassist Alex Malheiros from Azymuth used a 4001 bass during the band's early years (most notably between 1972 and 1977). His approach to samba, jazz and funk has some echoes of Chris Squire and Paul McCartney.

== Acoustic guitars ==
Rickenbacker has produced a number of uniquely designed and distinctively trimmed acoustic guitars. Although a small number of Rickenbacker acoustics were sold in the 1950s and were seen in the hands of stars like Ricky Nelson and Sam Cooke, the company concentrated on their electric guitar and western steel guitar business from the early 1960s onward. From about 1959 through 1994, very few Rickenbacker acoustic guitars were made.

In 1995, an effort was made to re-introduce Rickenbacker acoustics, with factory production beginning in their Santa Ana manufacturing facility in 1996. Four models of flat top acoustic Rickenbackers were depicted in factory literature (maple or rosewood back and sides, jumbo or dreadnaught shape). Each of these four models was also available in both six- and twelve-string configurations, yielding a range of eight distinct instruments. (The 760J "Jazzbo", an archtop model, was only built as a prototype, with three examples known to exist.) It is estimated that fewer than 500 Rickenbacker acoustic guitars were built before the factory shut down the acoustic department in mid-2006.

In late 2006, Rickenbacker gave a license to build Rickenbacker-branded acoustics to Paul Wilczynski, a luthier with a workshop in San Francisco, California. He continued to offer all eight models of the Rickenbacker flat top guitar line, building each instrument to order, until his license expired on February 1, 2013.

== Pickups ==
Rickenbacker manufactures three pickups for their current standard models: high-gain single-coil, Vintage Toaster single coil, and humbucking. All three pickup designs share the same footprint, so they can retrofit into most current or vintage models. The tone varies from one style to the next, partially because of the types of magnets used but also due to the amount of wire wound around the pickup's bobbin.

Most contemporary models come with single-coil high-gain pickups as standard equipment. Many post-British-Invasion players such as Peter Buck, Paul Weller, and Johnny Marr have used instruments with these pickups. Rickenbacker's HB1 humbucker/dual coil pickup has a similar tone to a Gibson mini-humbucker pickup, and comes standard on the Rickenbacker 650C and 4004 basses. Vintage reissue models, and some signature models, come with Toaster Top pickups, which resemble a classic two-slotted chrome toaster. Despite their slightly lower output, Toasters produce a brighter, cleaner sound, and are generally seen as key to obtaining the true British Invasion guitar tone, as they were original equipment of the era.

In addition to the standard pickups, vintage reissue bass models are equipped with Horseshoe wrap-around style pickups, very similar to the pickups on the earliest Rickenbacker Frying Pan models.

== Trademark enforcement ==
Rickenbacker is known for its efforts to prevent the sale of counterfeits of its instruments.

== See also ==
- List of Rickenbacker players
- List of Rickenbacker products
