= Adolph Rickenbacker =

American manufacturer and electric guitar inventor (1887–1976)

- Born: Adolf Rickenbacher; April 1, 1887; Basel, Switzerland
- Died: March 21, 1976 (aged 88); Orange County, California, U.S.
- Occupation: Inventor

Adolph Rickenbacker (born Adolf Rickenbacher, April 1, 1887 – March 21, 1976) was an American production engineer and machinist who, together with George Beauchamp, created the first electric string instrument, and co-founded the Rickenbacker guitar company, also with Beauchamp.

Rickenbacker was born in Basel, Switzerland as Adolf Rickenbacher. As a child in 1891, he immigrated to the United States with older relatives after his parents died, settling in Columbus, Ohio and later southern California. He Anglicized both his own name, and that of his company's brand, to Rickenbacker to capitalize on the popularity of his second cousin, America's top scoring flying ace of the First World War, Eddie Rickenbacker, who due to the wave of anti-German sentiment caused by the war, had felt pressure to change the spelling of his surname in an effort to "take the Hun out of his name." Eddie was already well known as a racing driver at the time, and his change received wide publicity. "From then on", as he wrote in his autobiography, "most Rickenbachers were practically forced to spell their name in the way I had..."

The Rickenbacher manufacturing Company produced parts for the National String Instrument Corporation, manufacturer of John Dopyera's Resonator guitars. Of particular importance was his ability to form guitar bodies with one of the largest deep drawing presses available. Rickenbacker held the title of Engineer at National. In October 1931, he joined George Beauchamp and Paul Barth to create Ro-Pat-In (ElectRo-Patent-Instruments), which was later renamed Electro String and became the producer of Rickenbacker guitars. Rickenbacker who was a significant investor in the guitar businesses was given the title of president, Paul Barth vice president, and George Beauchamp secretary-treasurer.

In 1934 Rickenbacker, along with George Beauchamp, filed a patent application for an "electrical stringed musical instrument". They received the patent in 1937 and developed an electric guitar for the mass market.

Adolph Rickenbacker died from cancer in Orange County, California in 1976 at the age of 88.
