= Rowe Industries =

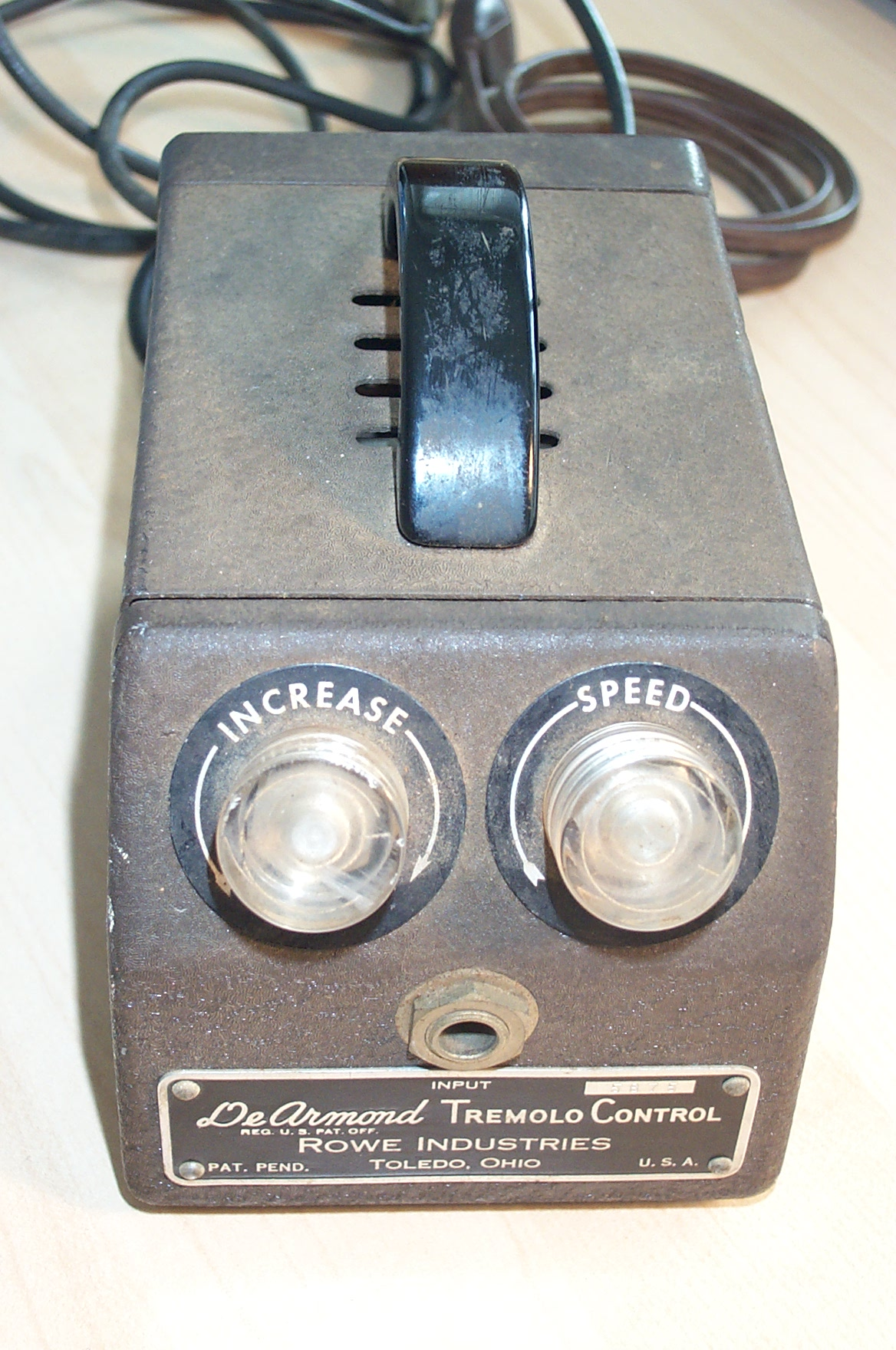
The DeArmond Tremolo Control manufactured by Rowe Industries was the first music effects unit

Rowe Industries was a manufacturer of guitar pickups and other music-related devices, as well as electrical components utilized in the aerospace industry into the 1980s.

Owner Horace "Bud" Rowe established a working relationship with budding electrical component designer Harold "Harry" DeArmond (January 28, 1906 – October 12, 1999). DeArmond is credited with developing the first commercially available detachable guitar pickup.

== Rowe-DeArmond collaboration ==
=== Early developments ===
Harold "Harry" DeArmond (January 28, 1906 – October 12, 1999) was an industrial designer of electrical components. His younger brother John was a budding guitarist at age 10 but wanted to make his guitar louder and better-sounding, and in 1935 created a magnetic pickup using components from the ignition coil of a Ford Model A. Harry realized the commercial potential of such a device, and began developing the idea into something commercially feasible. In part to support this undertaking, he founded DeArmond Research, at 4124 Secor Road in Toledo, Ohio (West Toledo), which he operated until the 1960s. One of his early contracts was as a design consultant for small manufacturing firms owned by entrepreneur Horace Rowe, a relationship that lasted through 1975.

In 1931, Rowe founded his first company, Fox Electrical and Manufacturing, located at 3120 Monroe Street in Toledo, Ohio. Among other commercial directions, Fox manufactured small electric motors, which required the tooling to create coils of insulated copper wire. DeArmond interested Rowe in turning the company's knowledge of coil winding to the building of guitar pickups. The name was changed to Fox Sound Equipment Corporation in 1935. A pickup-building operation was soon opened.

Bud Rowe consolidated his companies in 1940 as Rowe Industries, under which it operated through 1970.

=== The first DeArmond pickups ===
The first RH ("round-hole") and FH ("F-hole") guitar pickups were constructed in 1939. "Mounted within a metal casing, …six Alnico II pole pieces on a bakelite spool" with a coil of 42-gauge copper wire. (That same year, John DeArmond, age 14, hopped a train to California, where he worked as a musician until he was able to join the Navy.)

The RH was designed to fit into the opening of a standard ("round hole") guitar, with a wire clip at one end and two adjustable spring-steel arms at the other, making the device readily removable. To avoid interfering with performance, the device projected only a few millimeters above the soundboard.

The FH model had a significantly different appearance. One end of the metal-cased coil assembly fitted onto a 1/8" steel rod (called the pressure rod by the manufacturer), itself mounted parallel to the guitar's strings a short span away from the sixth (or "low E") string; this allowed the player to adjust the pickup's location for preferred tonal character and for minimal interference with performance. The end of the pressure rod was clamped across the strings between the guitar's bridge and tailpiece assemblies. The configuration was soon nicknamed "monkey on a stick" because of a resemblance to a popular child's toy of the era. As with the RH model, the FH could easily be installed and removed without modification (or damage) to the instrument. Later, an option was offered with a shorter pressure rod intended to be attached to the side of the guitar's neck with two small screws; this provided less interference with the guitarist's right hand as well as an aesthetically "cleaner" appearance.

Each pickup models was offered in a variant — the RHC and FHC respectively — that had a volume-control potentiometer. The FHC-B has a twelve-foot cable but no volume control, being intended for use with a volume pedal. The FHC-C had a volume control (potentiometer) in a small box on the cable, ten inches from the pickup.

The pressure-rod pickup design originally used an output cable with a threaded female connector on one end and a 1/4" plug on the other, a common configuration for high-impedance microphones of the era. The connector (Amphenol 80-75-MC1F, Switchcraft 2501F) had a knurled coupling ring, which allowed the fitting to attach to a corresponding male-threaded connector on the volume box or "module" which completed the signal path to the amplifier. The plastic insulation of the cables became stiff or brittle with age, prompting players to repair or replace these themselves in order to keep using the pickup. Eventually, DeArmond replaced the one-piece (twelve-foot) integral cables and the threaded connectors with a 1/8-inch phono jack on the pickup and provided an 1/8"-plug-to-1/4"-plug cable.

=== The Rhythm Chief ===
DeArmond introduced model 1000, the Rhythm Chief archtop guitar pickup, in 1948. This was followed late 1953 by the model 1100 Adjustable Rhythm Chief with individual polepiece screws and a fancier look (chrome plating, and later, gold plating). The 1100 was presented to the public along with the introduction of the 210, the adjustable-pole soundhole model.

=== Tap-style guitar ===
To promote the sensitivity of his pickups, Harry DeArmond developed a fretboard-tapping technique for guitar performance, creating notes with hammer-on and pull-off rather than picking, and sometimes playing two guitars simultaneously.

DeArmond's method was adopted by Jimmie Webster, a designer and demonstrator for Gretsch Guitars. Webster wrote a brief instruction book in 1952, popularized the technique in his travels, and in 1959 recorded an LP, Webster's Unabridged: Jimmie Webster's Stereo Guitar (RCA Victor LPM-1942).

=== The "gold foil" and 2000 models ===
In the 1950s, with the increasing popular interest in "electrified" guitars, some manufacturers turned to Rowe Industries rather than expending resources on making their own pickups. As a result, Harry DeArmond is best known for pickups used on inexpensive "beginner" instruments as well as quality guitars.

Most widely distributed were the so-called "gold foil" pickups, primarily installed in inexpensive Harmony Company guitars. Generally, these have a chrome-plated metal casing, with cut-out shapes (leading to further colloquial naming: diamond, S, moustache, scroll, and more), beneath which was placed a metalized plastic shim, for aesthetic reasons as well as to simply keep dust away from the pickup's inner parts. Being very simple in design, most of these pickups had no height adjustment, and often needed to be installed on some sort of a riser or pedestal to achieve optimum distance from the strings. Though widely scorned for years, these "cool"-impedance pickups eventually achieved popularity, in part because of the unique tone imparted by the heavy steel mounting plates. (The "gold foil" pickups were sometimes called "Golden Tone" pickups in catalogue copy; these should not be confused with the later "Goldtone" two-coil humbucking pickups.)

Among the finest — and most complex — DeArmond pickups were the Model 2000. These are best known for appearing on better models of Gretsch guitars, where they were called the Dynasonic (or sometimes DynaSonic, later renamed the FidelaTone so as not to clash with Rogers Drums over their Dyna-Sonic snare). These feature a moderately complex system of individual polepiece height adjustment, with the result that the steel components account for part of the pickup's unique tonal characteristics.

Harmony and Gretsch were the most important DeArmond customers. Besides them Rowe Industries pickups (including pressure-rod models) were factory installed by a wide range of other brands: C.F. Martin & Company used DeArmonds on their electrified D-18E and D-28E models. Other brands include Airline, D'Angelico, Eko, Epiphone, Fender, Galanti, Guild, Hofner, Kustom, Levin, Meazzi, Messenger, Micro-Frets, Premier, Silvertone, and Standel.

=== Effects devices and amplifiers ===
In 1941, Rowe Industries introduced the world's first effects unit intended specifically to modify the sound of an electric guitar. The floor-based Model 601 Tremolo Control contained a 120V AC motor that rocked a small sealed bottle fitted with two electrical contacts and containing electrically conductive fluid. The variable frequency of the "make and break" action of the mechanism created a type of tremolo effect. Bo Diddley and many other artists used this device. A foot-pedal version, the Model 800 Trem Trol followed in 1948, greatly reducing the awkward bulk of the 601.

In the early 1960s, Rowe Industries created a line of guitar amplifiers, including a series for C. F. Martin & Company.

Seeing a rising market for relatively simple (yet profitable) effects devices, in the later 1960s Rowe increased output of new effects-box models,

the Square Wave Distortion Generator and the DeArmond Wa-Wa pedal. The DeArmond Weeper… Wa-Wah pedal. …three versions of phase shifters including the model 1900 Pedal Phasor, the model 1920 Tornado Phase Shifter and the model 1930 Twister Phase Shifter.

=== Legacy ===
Harry DeArmond retired in 1976, by which time his company had designed and manufactured over 170 different pickups for a wide range of stringed instruments, and many amplifiers and effects units. DeArmond and Rowe each received multiple patents, which were utilized far beyond the music industry, including widely in the aerospace industry:

During the 1960s, in addition to their music-related products, Rowe Industries produced components for radar, aerospace and missile defense systems, including the Nike-Hercules missile, the Nike-X, the Apollo moon shot and the B-52 communications system.

A DeArmond pickup was used by guitarist Vic Flick on a 1939 English Clifford Essex Paragon De Luxe guitar recording the original James Bond Theme at CTS studios in Bayswater, London.

== Later use of trade names ==
Around 1998, Fender had acquired interests in various brands, including Guild Guitars and the DeArmond name. Fender launched a line of import Guild guitars from Korea and Indonesia under the DeArmond brand. The better Korean guitars had Dynasonic-style pickups also branded as DeArmond, and made in the United States, but there was no tangible connection to Rowe Industries or Harry DeArmond. The later "2K" pickups (subsequently appearing on models of Fender guitar) looked cosmetically like the Model 2000 but were just single-coil pickups, as is true of almost all subsequent copies.
