= Oberheim OB12 =

Synthesizer released in 2000

OB•12
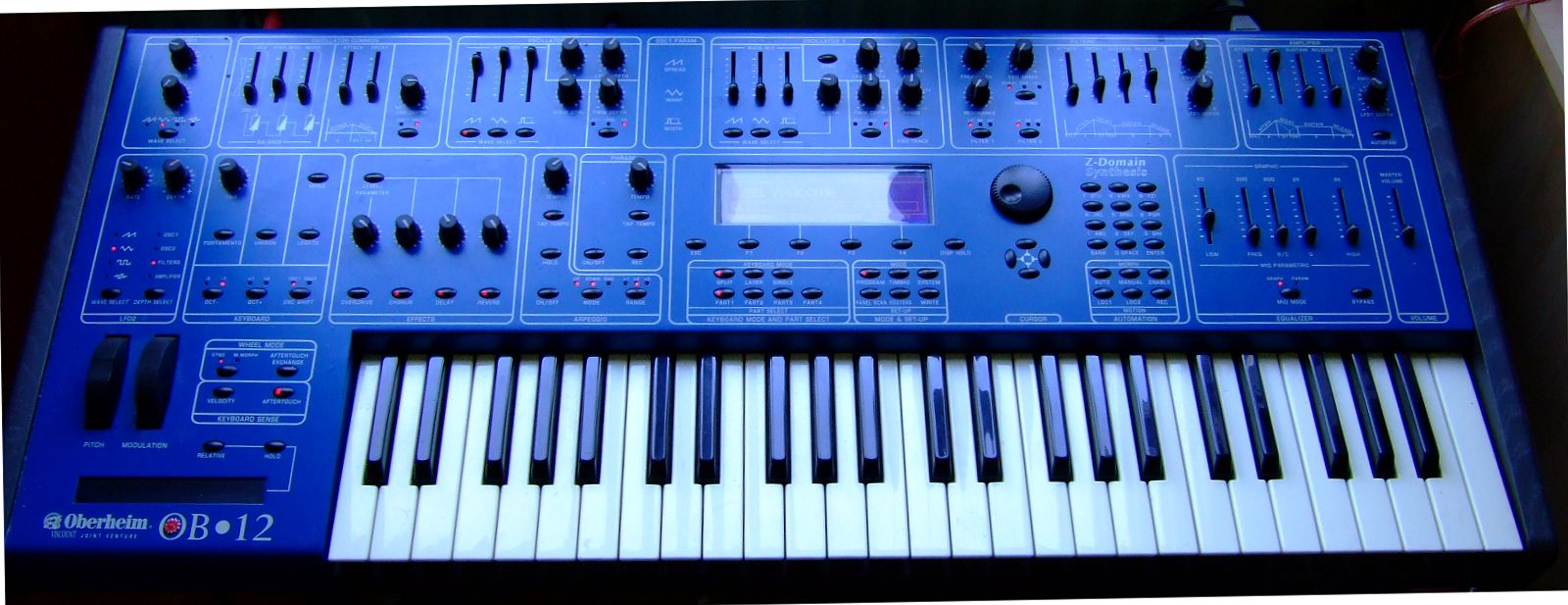
- OB•12 front panel
- Manufacturer: Oberheim / Viscount
- Dates: 2000–2005
- Price: RRP €1,400 (2000)

Technical specifications
- Polyphony: 12
- Timbrality: 4
- Oscillator: 2 + Noise + Ring Modulator
- LFO: Sawtooth, Triangle, Square, S&H noise
- Synthesis type: Virtual Analog Subtractive Synthesis
- Filter: 2× 12dB multimode
- Storage memory: 256 Timbre, 256 Programs; 16,000-event phrase recorder (196 memory slots); 2 motion recorder memory slot
- Effects: Overdrive, Chorus, Delay, Reverb, EQ

Input/output
- Keyboard: 49-key Aftertouch, Velocity
- Left-hand control: 2× Wheel, Ribbon
- External control: MIDI

The Oberheim OB•12 is a Virtual Analog synthesizer, designed and realised by the Italian musical instrument manufacturer Viscount, in production between 2000 and 2005.

The synth used Oberheim brand name under license from Gibson, which bought Oberheim rights after the original company went out of business in 1987.

The OB•12 was the second and last Oberheim synth whose creation had not involved original Oberheim company founder Tom Oberheim, the first one being the Oberheim OB-Mx.

Despite a brilliant look, an advanced synthesis engine, numerous features, a great hands-on interface and a very particular sound, the instrument failed to gain musicians’ favour, mostly because of its "non-Oberheim Oberheim" status. Also, the synth earned a reputation for being unreliable, since early versions of OB•12 contained several bugs in the operating system software. Eventually, most of the bugs were rectified, but it was already too late to save the instrument's reputation, and it was discontinued, bringing an end to the Oberheim / Viscount "joint venture," and ultimately Oberheim itself.

== Architecture and features ==
Oscillators and Sound Generators

Each of the 12 voices has 2 Oscillators. Each Oscillator has sawtooth, triangle and square/pulse waves, mixable in variable proportions. This feature is similar to the Roland SH-101, whose oscillator had mixable sawtooth, pulse (square) and a sub-oscillator.

In Oscillator 1, each waveform can be modified: saw's "spread" parameter adds a second detuned sawtooth, triangle "wrap" progressively clips the waveform adding inharmonic content, and pulse wave has variable pulse width; PWM is also available, and the modulation source can be chosen from LFO1, LFO2 and OSC ENV. Oscillator 2 can frequency-modulate (FM) Oscillator 1.

In Oscillator 2, saw and triangle waveforms cannot be modified/modulated: only the pulse wave can be varied; PWM is also available. Unlike OSC1, the second oscillator provides fine detune and coarse detune +-24 steps, and keyboard tracking may be disengaged. Oscillator 2 can be synced (slave) to Oscillator 1 (master oscillator).

An Oscillator Common section is provided to balance the mix of OSC1 and OSC2, the ring modulator and the noise generator.

Multimode Dual Filter

The OB•12 has two VCF, each one being a 12 db (2 pole) filter.
For each filter, mode can be chosen between high pass, low pass, band pass and off.
Filters routing can be parallel, split or serial, the latter resulting in a 24 db (4 pole) filter.
Cutoff, resonance, modulators and keyboard tracking affect both VCFs.

The Delta parameter, available in parallel and split mode, change the cutoff frequency of the second filter; by using bandpass mode for both filters and by widening their cutoff frequencies, two formants peak may be formed, creating vocal-like timbres.

Besides the OB•12, 1983's OSC OSCar synthesizer is the only synth having this facility; in the OSCar this function is called "separation" and has a dedicated knob in the filter section, unlike the OB•12, whose Delta parameter is inside filter's edit menu.

Envelopes

Two DADBSR envelopes are present, one routed to the VCF and the second to the VCA. While the control panel has sliders for the typical ADSR envelopes, the 'envelope edit' menu adds control for delay time before the attack, break-point level after decay, and variable sustain time.

A third ADD envelope is destinated to pitch modulation. While the control panel has sliders for the typical AD envelope, the 'envelope edit' menu adds control for Decay1 Level and Decay2 Time, thus resulting in a more complex envelope; Decay1 Level is effectively a "break point" kind of function; variable envelope depths for OSC1 and OSC2 are provided, thus providing much bigger programming flexibility.

LFOs

The OB•12 has two LFOs, offering sawtooth, triangle, square and random waveforms. LFO1 offers Fade (gradual fade-in of the amplitude) and Delay time (retards the onset of modulation). Both can be routed to Osc1 pitch, Osc2 pitch, Osc1 PWM, Osc2 PWM, VCF cutoff and VCA level; LFO1 can also modulate Pan. Both LFOs have a variable dedicated Cutoff which filters some of the harmonics, providing smoother LFO waveshapes. LFO2's depth is routed by default to the modulation wheel; a button on the top panel exchange the modulation wheel and aftertouch functions, to provide more modulation routings for the modulation wheel.

Performance features

Almost all sound parameters have a dedicated knob or slider and can be changed in real-time.

Real time modulation sources include pitch wheel, modulation wheel, ribbon controller, keyboard velocity and aftertouch. While the first wheel is destinated to the modification of the pitch to up to 24 semitones, the other modulation sources have a large choice of destinations, including many parameters related to LFOs, envelopes, oscillator and oscillator common functions; the ribbon controller can control up to two parameters at the same time.

With the Morph function, morphing between two sounds can be accomplished, either in real time (using the modulation wheel), or automated (with a definable morphing time); the result is an interpolation from one timbre to another, causing the initial timbre to 'evolve' into the final one.

Similar to the Morphing function, the onboard Motion Recorder is very useful to record modifications of all the synth parameters that are controlled by continuous controllers (knobs and sliders) and have them available for playback. The Motion Recorder consists of two memory slots, each one storing up to two minutes' worth of controllers movements.

Automations section also spots a multimode arpeggiator with UP, DOWN, UP/DOWN and Random mode; the arpeggio can be transposed to up to 4 octaves; there are 7 regular beat patterns (1/4, 1/4t (triplet), 1/8, 1/8t, 1/16, 1/16t, 1/32) and 7 irregular patterns (presets) providing more complex rhythmic possibilities.

Alternatively to the Arpeggiator, there is another feature that is dedicated to the generation of sequenced patterns: the Phrase Recorder. The Phrase Recorder section is effectively a phrase sequencer whose purpose is to record single note melodies and have them available for loop playback, triggered from the pilot key. There are four Phrase Recorder sets, and by recording and assigning a phrase for each key of the keyboard, a total of 196 phrases could be stored in memory, provided that the total number of the events won't exceed the 16,000 notes memory.

Effects

The OB•12 offers four independent FX units, all available at the same time, and with a flexible routing facility. These effects, which are totally configurable, are Overdrive, Chorus, Delay and Reverb. In addition, there is an EQ section, whose mode can be exchanged between a 5 bands graphic EQ or 3 band parametric EQ.

Voice modes

The OB•12 is 12 voice polyphonic, and 4-part multi-timbral. Besides polyphonic playing, Mono (normal or Legato) mode can be chosen, and a very flexible Unison facility is on board too. Since Unison use 3 notes polyphony for each played note, the Unison mode reduce the polyphony to 4 notes.

Internal organisation

Patches can be stored in 512 memory locations. Of those, 256 are Timbres (single sounds) and the other 256 are Programs (multi sounds); a Program can consist of up to 4 Timbres, layered or split. Unison, Mono are Timbre parameters, while Effects, Arpeggiator/Phrase recorder settings and EQ settings are stored as part of a program.

Rear panel

Rear panel presents standard MIDI in/out/thru ports, 4 mono jack outputs (L, R, AUX 1 and AUX 2), 1 Digital Out (S/PDIF), and 4 (2 pedal and 2 switch) inputs.
