= Ace Tone =

Japanese manufacturer of electronic musical instruments

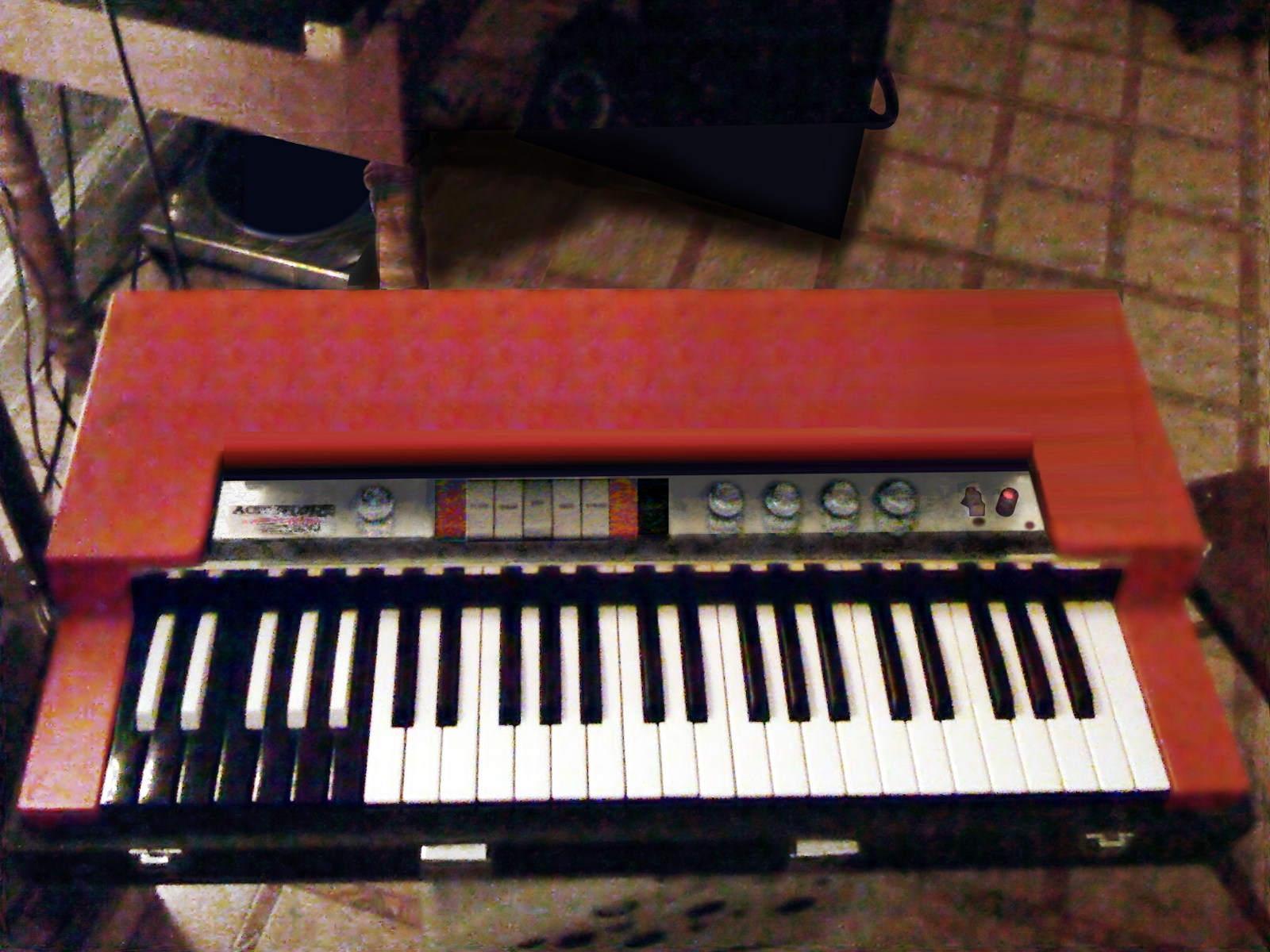
Ace Tone TOP-1

Ace Electronic Industries Inc., or Ace Tone, was a manufacturer of electronic musical instruments, including electronic organs, analogue drum machines, and electronic drums, as well as amplifiers and effects pedals. Founded in 1960 by Ikutaro Kakehashi with an investment by Sakata Shokai, Ace Tone can be considered an early incarnation of the Roland Corporation, which was also founded by Kakehashi. Ace Tone began manufacturing amplifiers in 1963.

== History ==
Ikutaro Kakehashi began learning practical mechanical engineering as a teenager, and found there was a demand for electronics repair in Japan following the end of World War II. After recovering from tuberculosis in 1954, he opened a goods store in Osaka and began assembling and repairing radios. He attempted to build an electric organ in the late 1950s from spares, including parts of an old reed organ, telephones and electronic components, and started a business in 1960, initially making amplifiers. He subsequently designed an organ that was sold by Matsushita.

In 1964, Kakehashi designed his first hand playing electronic drum, the R1 Rhythm Ace, constructed from transistor circuitry. It was designed to be attached below the manuals on a home organ, and had six buttons that created a variety of percussion sounds. It was presented at that year's NAMM Show. However, it lacked automatic accompaniment and so was unsuccessful.

In 1965, Ace Tone established a US distribution agreement with Sorkin. In 1967, the company introduced the Rhythm Ace FR-1, which allowed a variety of automatically played popular rhythms with a variable tempo. It was commercially successful and led to partnership with the Hammond Organ Company, who added Ace Tone's rhythm units to its range of instruments. At the end of the 1960s, Ace Tone began manufacturing guitar effects boxes, such as fuzz which was modelled on an earlier Gibson model.

== Products ==
=== Electronic keyboards ===
==== Clavioline ====
- Canary S-2 (1962) — Vacuum tube clavioline, exhibited on 1964 Summer NAMM, but not released.
- Canary S-3 (Three legs) — Transistor clavioline

==== Combo organs ====
- TOP-1 (1968 or 1969)
- TOP-3 (Phenix) (1965)
- TOP-4 (Phenix)
- TOP-5 (c. 1969)
- TOP-6 (c. 1972)
- TOP-7
- TOP-8
- TOP-9 (1968 or 1969)
- GT-2 (c. 1975) — predecessor of Hammond X-2 (c. 1978) and possibly Hammond B-100W (c. 1983)
- GT-5 (c. 1971) — predecessor of Ace Tone X-3/X-3W (c. 1978) and possibly Hammond B-250W (c. 1983)
- GT-7 (1971) — predecessor of Hammond X-5 (c. 1978) and Hammond B-200 (c. 1980).
- X-3/X-3W (c. 1978) — although model name evokes Hammond X series, it was shipped under Ace Tone brand.

Combo organ accessories

- OR-30 Transistorized Bench Amplifier
- PK-2 Organ Bass Pedals
- Expander/Expression Pedal EXP-4
- HP-10 Headphone (for combo organ)
- HP-20 Headphone

==== Home organs ====
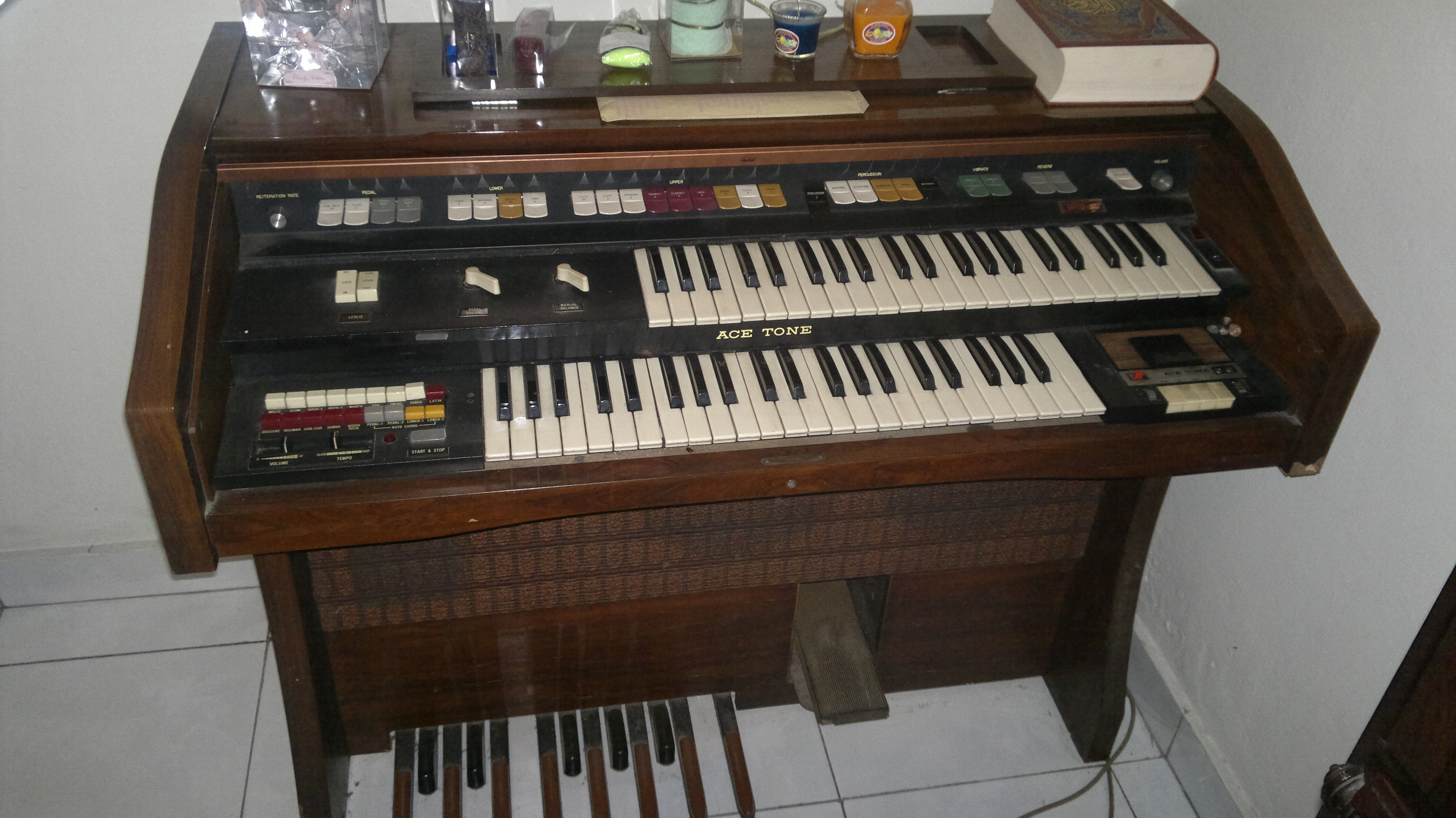
Ace Tone unknown home organ model. (possibly Ace 3000 in the 1970s)

- TO-S1 (c. 1966)
- A-122
- B-422
- B-5
- C-422S
- Ace 1000 / 2000 / 3000 (c. 1970s) — designed based on Hammond Cadette series. Ace 3000 has built-in cassette recorder on the lower right.

==== OEM Organs ====
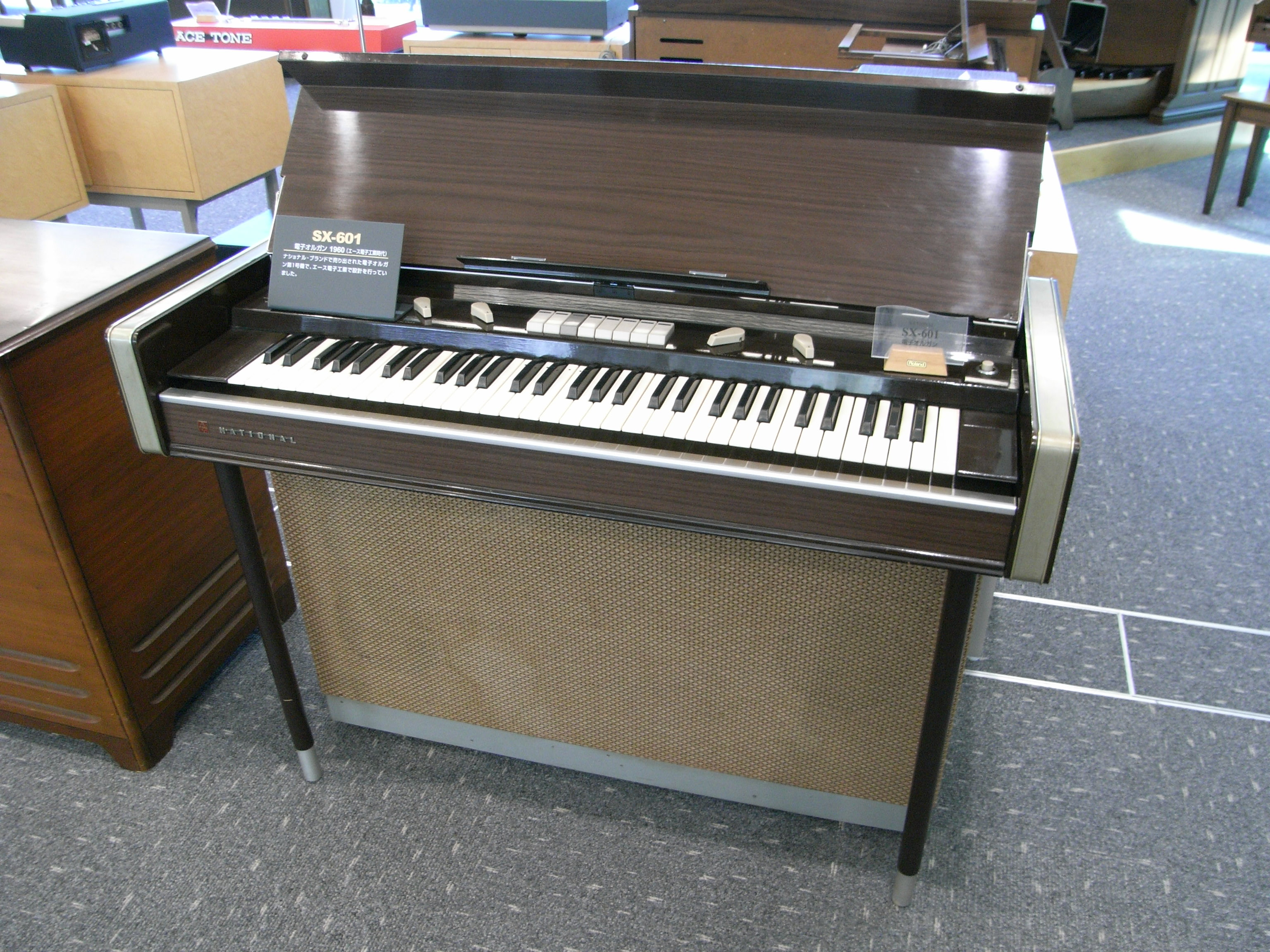
National SX-601 (1963) exhibited at Roland Corporation Hamamatsu Lab.

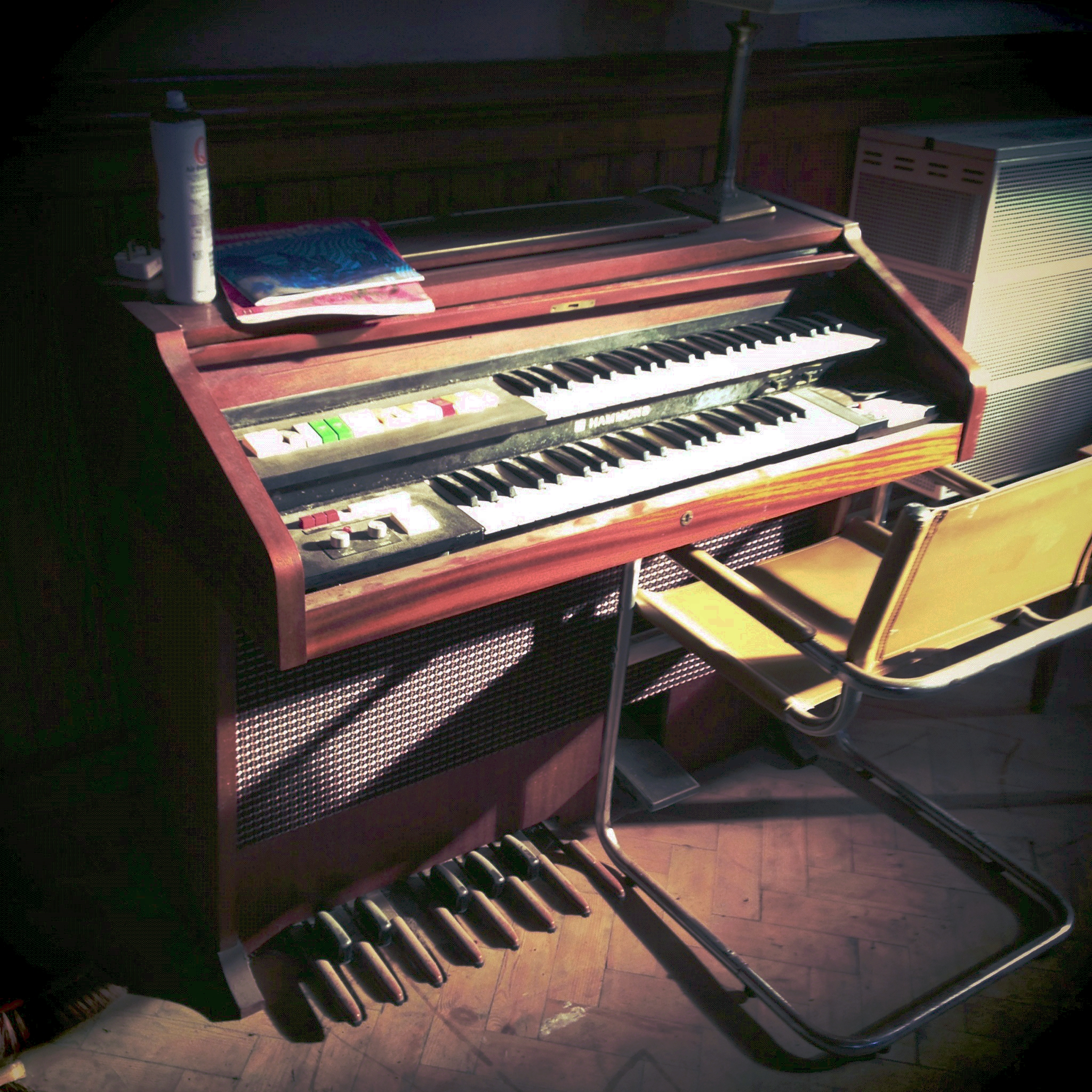
Hammond VS-300 Cadette (1973–?)

- National (Panasonic) SX-601 (1963)
- Hammond VS-300 Cadette (1973–?) — although early Cadettes were built in Japan by Yamaha/Nippon Gakki, later models in the United Kingdom were built by Ace Tone/Nihon Hammond. (Note: Nihon Hammond: In the mid-1970s, Ace Electronic Industries Inc. was restructured and "ACE TONE" brand was taken over by Nihon Hammond established circa 1970, a joint enterprise of Hammond Organ Company in Chicago and Sakata Shokai in Osaka, Japan.)
- Hammond F 1000 / 2000 / 3000 (1970s) — these models were built in England during the 1970s, were variations of Ace 1000 / 2000 / 3000 designed & built in Japan, based on Hammond Cadette series.

==== Electronic piano ====
- AP-100 Electronic Piano

==== Synthesizers ====
- Multistrings SY-5
- PS-1000 Monosynth (1975) — similar to Roland SH-3/SH-3A (1974)
- SY-100 Monosynth (Note: Ace Tone 2 VCOs monophonic synthesizer SY-100 (image). Vintage Synth Explorer forum. Archived from the original on December 2, 2020.)

=== Effects ===
- Analog Delay EH-50
- Analog Delay EH-100
- Echo Chamber EC-1
- Reverb/Echo Chamber EC-10 Professional Echo
- Echo Chamber EC-20
- FUZZ/BOOSTER
- Fuzz Master FM-1 (c. 1966–68)
- Fuzz Master FM-2 (c. 1968–)
- Fuzz Master FM-3 (c. 1971–)
- Graphic Equalizer QH-100
- Stereo Phasor LH-100
- Twin Ace FW-1 (Fuzz + Wah)
- Wah Master WM-1

=== Drum machines ===
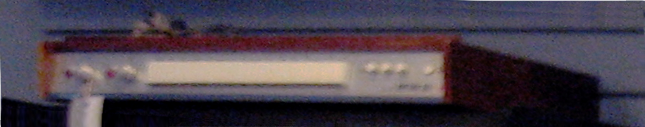
FR-2L / Hammond Auto

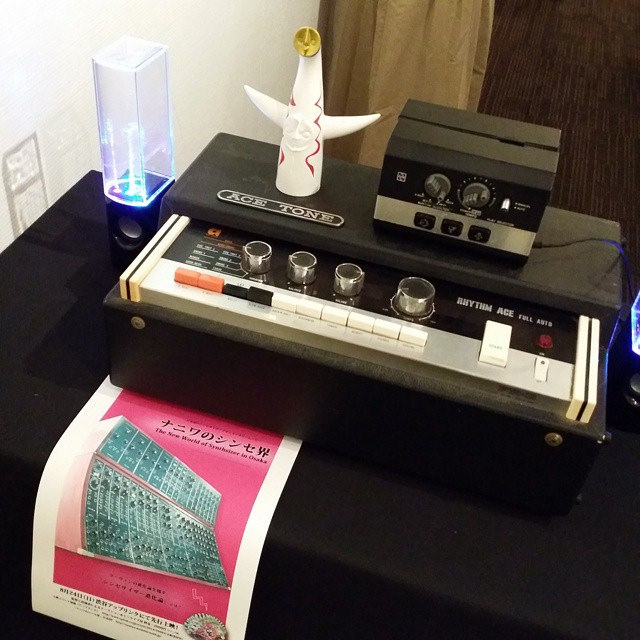
FR-3

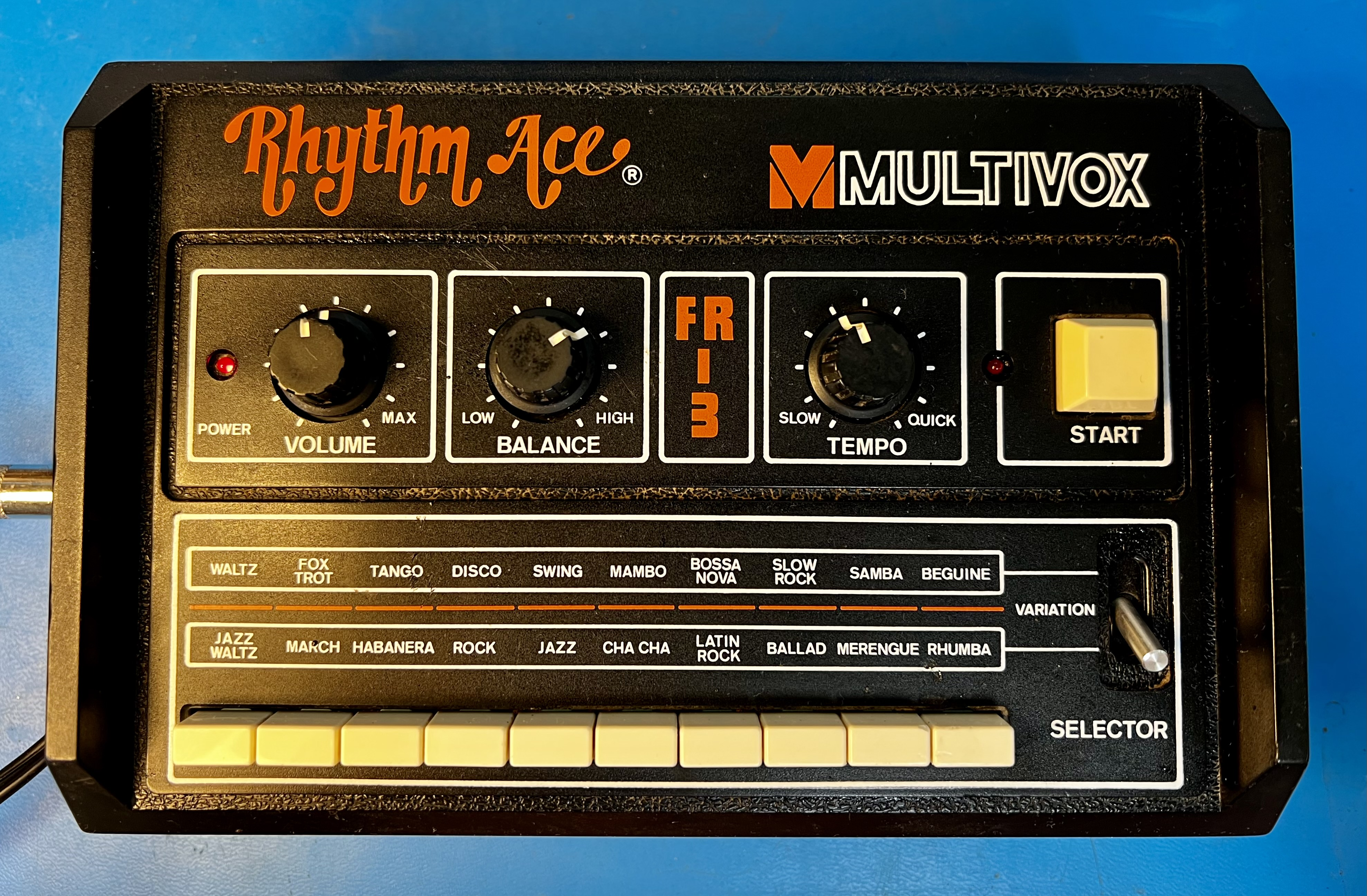
FR-3S, sold under the Multivox brand. Note that it share several similarities with Korg Minipops.

- R1 Rhythm Ace (push-button electronic drum percussion) (1964)
- Rhythm Ace R-3 (1966)
- Rhythm Ace FR-1 (1967) (Note: In 1967, FR-1 was introduced as option of Hammond organ.)^{[A][H]}
- Rhythm Ace FR-2L ^{[A][H]}
- Auto Rhythm FR-2D ^{[S][H]}
- Rhythm Ace FR-3 (c. 1967) ^{[A][H],[R]}
- Rhythm Ace FR-3S ^{[M]}
- Rhythm Ace FR-4 ^{[M]}
- Rhythm Ace FR-6/FR-6P (c. 1972 or 1974) ^{[A][S]}
- Rhythm Ace FR-6M ^{[M]}
- Rhythm Ace FR-7M
- Rhythm Producer FR-7L ^{[R][H]}
- Rhythm Producer FR-8L ^{[A][M]}
- Rhythm Ace FR-13
- Rhythm Producer FR-15 (1975) — partly programmable rhythm machine
- Rhythm Ace FR-20 (Floor type)
- Rhythm Ace FR-30 (Floor type)
- Rhythm Ace FR-60 (Floor type)
- Rhythm Ace FR-70 (Floor type)
- Rhythm FEVER FR-106 ^{[S]}
- Hammond Auto-Vari 64 (AV-64) ^{[A][H]}

Note: Rhythm Ace series were known to be shipped under multiple brands as follows:

Since 1967, Hammond Organ Company distributed Rhythm Ace under Hammond brand.

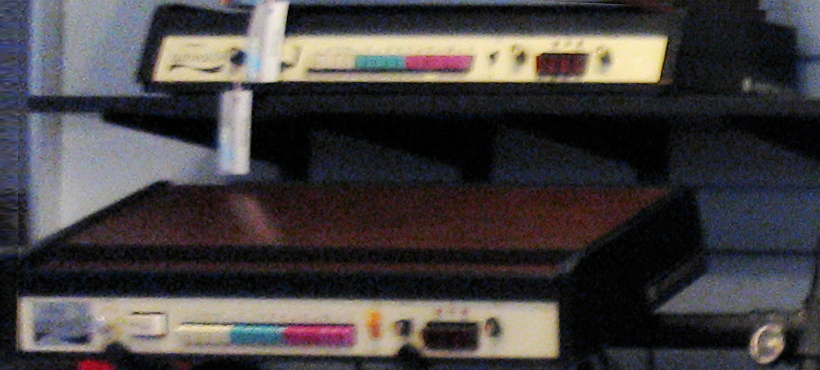
Hammond Auto-Vari 64 (based on Roland Rhythm 77)

[A][H] Ace Tone model also shipped from Hammond.

- Ace Tone FR-2L ⇒ Hammond Auto (1972)
- Ace Tone FR-3 ⇒ Hammond Rhythm 2

[R][H] Hammond shipped far improved model based on Roland's improved model.

- Ace Tone FR-7L ⇒ Roland Rhythm 77 (1972) ⇒ Hammond Auto-Vari 64 (1974)

[S][H] Hammond models manufactured by Nihon Hammond.

In the 1970s, possibly several models were also distributed under Multivox brand by Sorkin Music, an early general agent of Ace Tone in the United States. On the other hand, late-1970s models such as Multivox FR-3 seem to share several similarities with Korg Minipops.

[M] Multivox models
[A][M] Also shipped from Multivox

In the mid-1970s, "ACE TONE" brand was taken over by Sakata/Nihon Hammond.

[S] Sakata/Nihhon Hammond models
[A][S] Also shipped from Sakata/Nihhon Hammond.

In 1972, Kakehashi left Ace Electronics and established Roland Corporation.

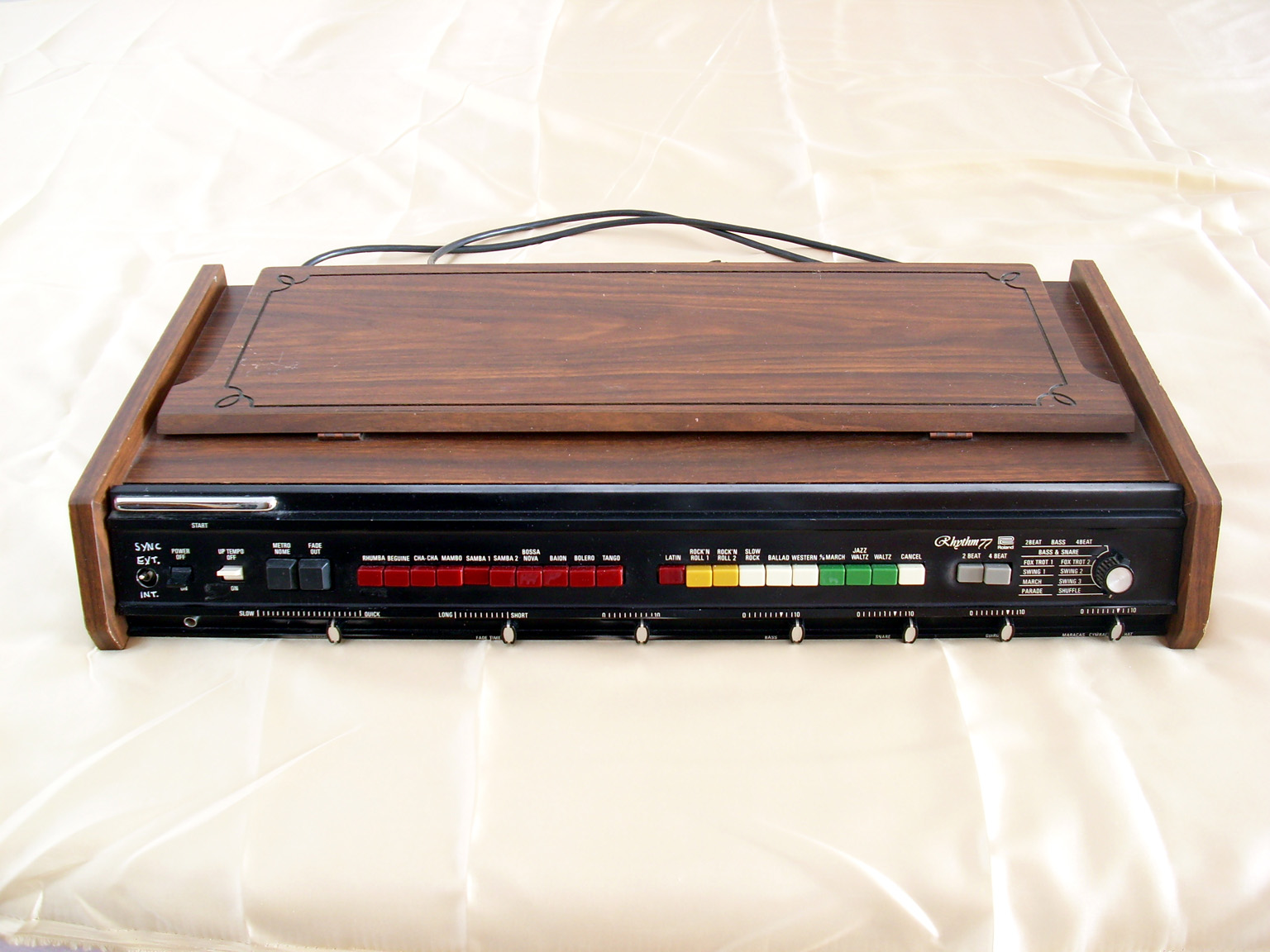
Roland Rhythm 77 (based on FR-7L)

[R] Roland released improved models in 1972:

- Ace Tone FR-3L ⇒ Roland Rhythm 33 (1972, TR-33)
- Ace Tone FR-7L ⇒ Roland Rhythm 77 (1972, TR-77)

=== Amplifiers ===
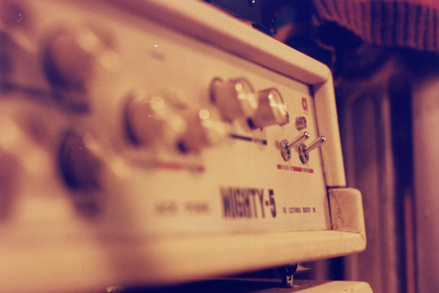
An Ace Tone Mighty-5 Amplifier

==== Guitar ====
- Mini Ace (Combo)
- Mini-8 (Combo)
- Solid Ace-1/SA-1 (Combo)
- Solid Ace-2/SA-2 (Combo)
- Solid Ace-3 (Head/Cab), SA-3 (Combo), SA-3C (Combo), SA-3D
- Solid Ace-5/SA-5 (Combo)
- Solid Ace-6/SA-6 (Head/Cab)
- Solid Ace-7 (Combo)
- Solid Ace-8/SA-8 (Head/Cab)
- Solid Ace-9/SA-9 (Head)
- Solid Ace-10/SA-10 (Head/Cab)
- SA-15 (Combo)
- SA-25 (Combo)
- SA-45 (Combo)
- SA-60 (Combo)
- SA-120 (Head/Cab)
- SA-150 (Head/Cab)
- Friend Ace AR-1 (Combo)
- Gut's Ace
- GA-5S Cabinet
- G-15 Guitar Amplifier (Combo) (1977)
- G-35 (Combo)
- G-50 (Combo)
- GH-1 (Preamp + Mixer) (c. 1976)
- GH-600/GH-600S (Combo/Powered Cab) (c. 1976)
- GH-1200/GH-1200S (Combo/Powered Cab) (c.1976)
- L35 (Combo)

===== Tube =====
- A-10 Fighter
- Mighty-5 (Head/Cab) — 50Watt
- Rockey (Combo) — 15 Watt 1× 12"
- Elite (Combo) — 4 Watt, 1× 8" (a.k.a. Model A-1R)
- Duetto (Combo)
- Model-101 (Combo) — 1× 8"
- Model-201 (Combo)
- Model-301 (Combo)
- Model-601 (Head/Cab) (c. 1968)

==== Bass ====
- Bass-3/B-3 (Combo) — Solid State
- Bass-6/B-6 (Head/Cab) — Solid State
- B-7 (Head/Cab)
- Bass-9/B-9 (Head/Cab)
- B-50 (Combo)
- BH-1 (Preamp + Mixer)
- BH-600S (Powered Cab)
- BH-1200S (Powered Cab)

==== Vocal and mixers ====
- VM-4 Solid State Channel Mixer (4ch Powered Mixer)
- VM-6 (6ch Powered Mixer)
- VM-30 (Combo)
  - SL-30 (Powered Cab for VM-30)
- VM-45 (Combo)
- VM-50/VS-50 (Powered Mixer/Cab)
- Channel Mixer VM-80 Professional/VS-80 (6ch Powered Mixer/Cab)
- VM-85/VS-85 (Powered Mixer/Cab)
- VM-150/VS-150 (Powered Mixer/Cab)
- VM-200 (Powered Mixer with Wireless Mic & Cab)
- Echo Mixer MP-4 (4ch Mixer)
- MP-40 (4ch Mixer)
- PH-1 (Mixer)
- PH-2 (Mixer)
- PH-600S (Powered Cab)
- PH-1200S (Powered Cab)

=== Speaker systems ===
- BSP-6 — 2× 12" speakers
- SP-15 — 1× 15" Gold Bond speaker
- SP-30 — 2× 15" Gold Bond speakers
- SP-35 — 2× 15" extra massive speakers
- SP-45 — 3× 15" Gold Bond speakers
- SP-10 — 2× 15" + 2× 8" speakers
- SP-410 — 4× 15" speakers

=== Other ===
- AD-171 Dynamic Microphone
- AE-181 Electret Condencer Microphone
- AD-191 Dynamic Microphone
- AD-201 Dynamic Microphone
- Mic Adapter MP-1 (2ch Mic Preamp)
- Multi-Vox EX-100 (Wind Instrument Preamp)
- Psyche Light PL-125
- Tuning Gun AT-32 (Tuner)

== See also ==
- Multivox
- The Dave Howard Singers, a band that popularized the sound of the Acetone Top 5

== Notes ==
Media

== Sources ==
- Ace Tone & Nihon Hammond Catalogs:
  - Ace Tone Catalog 1969. Sorkin/Ace Tone. 1969. (for details, see PDF version)
  - Ace Tone Professional Amplifiers Catalog 1971. Sorkin Music Company Inc. June 1971. Archived from the original on May 13, 2014.
  - Ace Tone Catalog 1972 (in Japanese). Ace Electronic Industry Inc. July 1972.
  - Ace Tone Catalog 1975 (in Japanese). Nihon Hammond, Ltd. July 1975.
  - Ace Tone Guitar Amplifiers Catalog 1976 (in Japanese). Nihon Hammond, Ltd. 1976. Archived from the original on May 13, 2014. (excerpt)
  - Ace Tone Catalog 1978 (in Japanese). Nihon Hammond, Ltd. September 1978.
  - Hammond L.M. Catalogue 1983 (in Japanese). Nihon Hammond, Ltd. 1983. Archived from the original on November 22, 2008.
- Stachowiak, Joe (November 2, 2012). "ROLAND MUSEUM & COMPANY HISTORY". Absolute Music Solutions Ltd. — a visit report on Roland Corporation Hamamatsu Laboratory where early Ace Tone products are also exhibited.
  Note: the production years seen on their private museum are not reliable. For example, production years of early product/prototype (Canary S-2 (1962), R-1 Rhythm Ace (1964)), and the later mass-production models (Canary S-3 (c. 1965), Rhythm Ace FR-1 (c. 1967)) are mysteriously confused.
- "Ace Tone". The Audio Playground Synthesizer Museum. Archived from the original on June 30, 2008. — List of products and some corporate history.
- "Ace Tone". Combo Organ Heaven. — Profiles of organs and corporate history.
- Lenhoff, Alan; Robertson, David (2019). Classic Keys: Keyboard sounds that launched rock music. University of North Texas Press. ISBN 978-1-57441-776-0.
- Harmony Central: Ace Tone: Reviews — Reviews of Ace Tone products.
- Orgel Wiki: Ace Tone — more pictures of organ models.
- VintageSynth.hu: Ace — more pictures of products.
