= Multivox =

American musical instrument company

Multivox was an American-based synthesizer company since the mid-1970s until the 1980s. Originally it was founded in the mid-1940s as the guitar and amplifier manufacturing subsidiary of Peter Sorkin Music Company (Sorkin Music), a New York-based retailer/wholesaler. Then eventually it established separate corporate identity, and after the close of Sorkin Music in the mid-1970s, it continued in existence for fourteen years, according to the Blue Book of Guitar Values. In addition to synthesizers, the company marketed several effects pedals. These included the Big Jam series guitar effects line.

They specialized in delivering Japanese-designed and built equipment to the American market. They usually licensed from lesser-known Japanese companies, such as Hillwood, also known as Firstman, founded in 1972 by Kazuo Morioka, who later worked for Akai in the early 1980s. Multivox were criticized as having design and circuitry extremely similar to but inferior to designs by Roland. Multivox ceased trading in the early 1980s having "faded into synth history", according to the Synthmuseum.

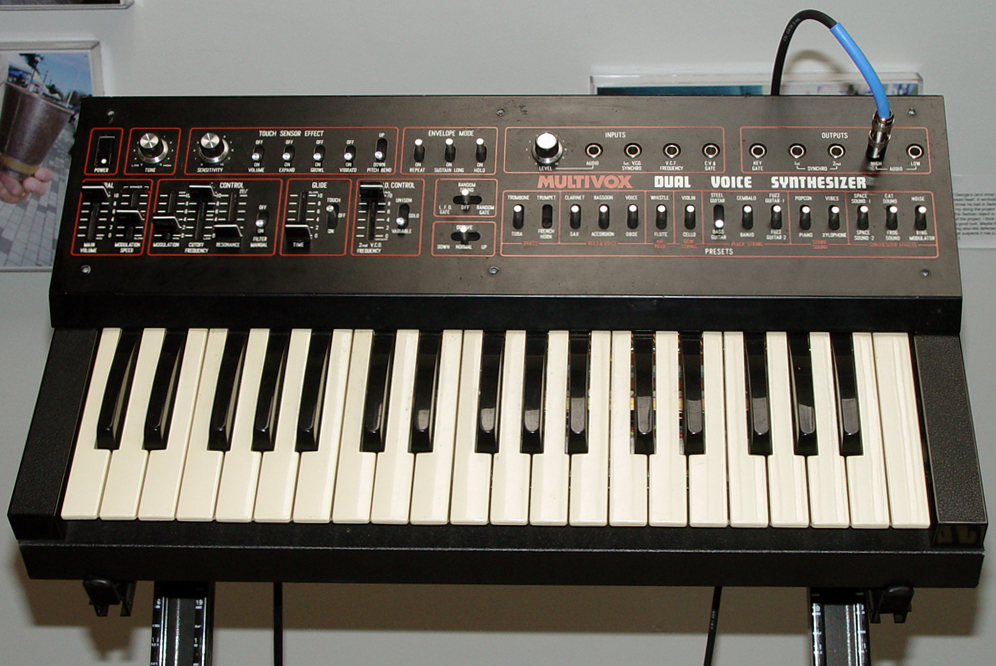
MULTIVOX MX-75 dual voice synthesizer

== Re-branding ==
As a result of the old criticism of Multivox synthesizer technology and their comparisons with Roland hardware, several hoax/fraudulent cases have occurred. The main hoax was based around a Multivox MX-3000 synthesizer (the flagship of the Multivox range). These machines are quite rare although not particularly sought for by collectors and musicians. Hence when a Roland MX-3000 was offered for sale much controversy surrounding the original Multivox design was stirred up. Eventually the seller admitted that the synthesizer was in fact Multivox, but he had re-badged it in an attempt to generate interest.

== The Multivox range ==
=== Synthesizers ===
Multivox produced over 15 different types of synthesizers, almost all with names beginning with "MX-" (except for SQ-01).

- MX-20 - An electric piano produced from 1977 to 1978. Had five presets (high/low piano and clavichord and 'honky tonk') and a bass split with independent volume control. 61 key keyboard. Tune, Sustain and vibrato controls.
- MX-28 - The MX-28's literature says (C)1981. It is very similar to MX20 except that it uses sliders instead of rotary knobs and has a Phaser instead of vibrato. It also has a built in speaker on the right side. The 'high/low' variations of the voices is omitted, but on this machine you can actually blend the voices together.
- MX-30 - This model is a slight expansion on the MX-20 having a 61-key velocity-sensitive keyboard.
- MX-51 - Another piano-based model.
- MX-57/Electro-Snare - A drum synthesizer with 2VCO/VCF/VCA/SWEEP. The design is similar to the Star Instruments SYNARE 3.
- MX-65 - Polyphonic Keyboard with 6 string sounds. Envelope, LFO and Ensemble controls.
- MX-75 - Duophonic preset synthesizer with aftertouch effect. A repackaging of the MX-2000. Also known as Pulser M75. Developed by Hillwood.
- MX-99 - Mini Echo - An analog delay with volume tone repeat and delay controls
- MX-150/Basky II - An organ-style bass pedal.. Although rare and of modest value, Alex Scally of the Indie Pop band Beach House plays an MX-150 as part if his regular gear rig. https://equipboard.com/items/multivox-mx-150-basky-ii.
- MX-202 - String & Bass ensemble. Very similar to the Roland RS-202 synthesizer.
- MX-440 - Same as above. Some MX-440 might be re-badged MX-202.
- MX-450 - Very rare Bass Pedal. Little is known. More sources needed. Adds more functionality to the original MX-150/Basky II along with a significant look redesign including a black finish and larger knobs that can be turned by foot.. The main differences are the addition of a sub-oscillator with a dedicated knob so as to allow detuning against the main oscillator. The MX-150/Basky II also has two octave buttons, one up and one down, whereas the MX-450 has a single switch to toggle between octaves. The MX-150/Basky II has Tone and Resonance knobs, the MX-450 also has a Resonance knob and Frequency knob pair, in both cases ostensibly to allow emulation of some Moog Taurus sounds. The internal build of the MX-450 is also different and more rugged. The differences between the two pedals is more than functional; they sound very different.
- MX-880 DUO - Same as below.
- MX-2000 DUO - Duophonic preset synthesizer with aftertouch effect. It blatantly copies both cosmetic design and most circuits from the Roland SH-2000 design, adding a second VCO, but can sound different. Developed by Hillwood.
- MX-3000 - The largest and most feature-laden synthesizer of the range. Includes an individual bass synth, preset synth, preset edit synth, and monophonic lead synth. And a blend control for all 4 synths. Also known as Pulser M85. Developed by Hillwood.

=== Digital sequencers ===
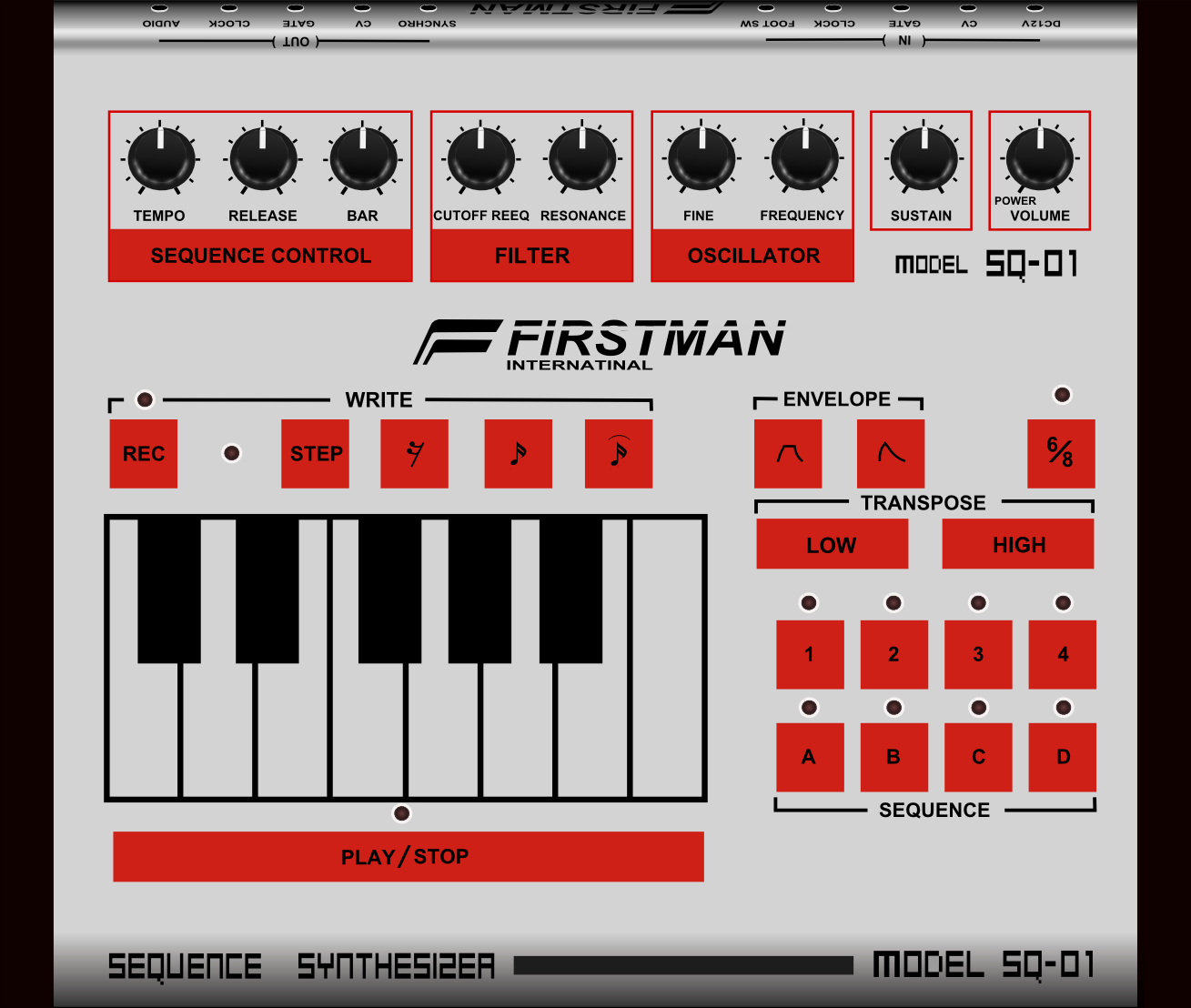
SQ-01 (1980/1981)

- SQ-01 - A combination of synthesizer and sequencer. Performs bass synth functions similar to the later Roland TB-303 released in 1981. Originally released in 1980 by Hillwood under Firstman brand, before Multivox released it in 1981.
- MX-8100 Sequencer - Digital keyboard sequencer with up to 4 patterns depending on how much memory you use for the patterns. The MX-8100 has separate outputs for V/Oct and Hz/V control voltages. Developed by Hillwood.
- MX-S100 - Misreference- no such model exists.

=== Drum machines ===
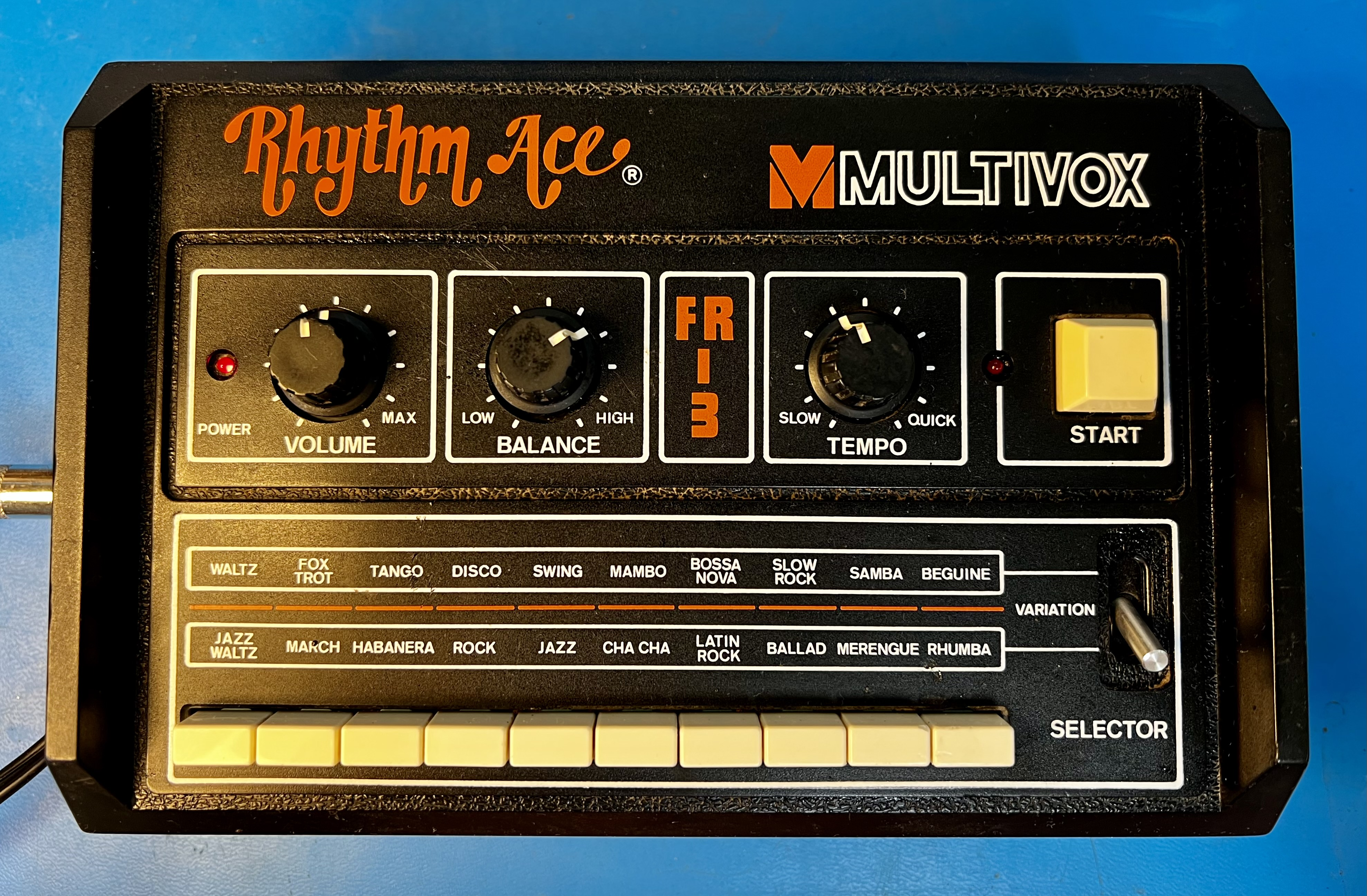
Multivox Rhythm Ace FR-3S

- Rhythm Ace FR-3S (c. 1979) - Multivox version of Rhythm Ace analog drum machine. It seems released after the Multivox/Sorkin Music stopped the engage with former OEM manufacturers, Ace Tone by Ace Electronics and Roland Corporation. AnalogAudio1 on YouTube pointed out the similarity with Korg Mini-Pops hardware.

=== Effect processors ===
- LD-2/Little David - One of the world first Leslie speaker simulator.

==== Big Jam series - guitar effect pedals ====
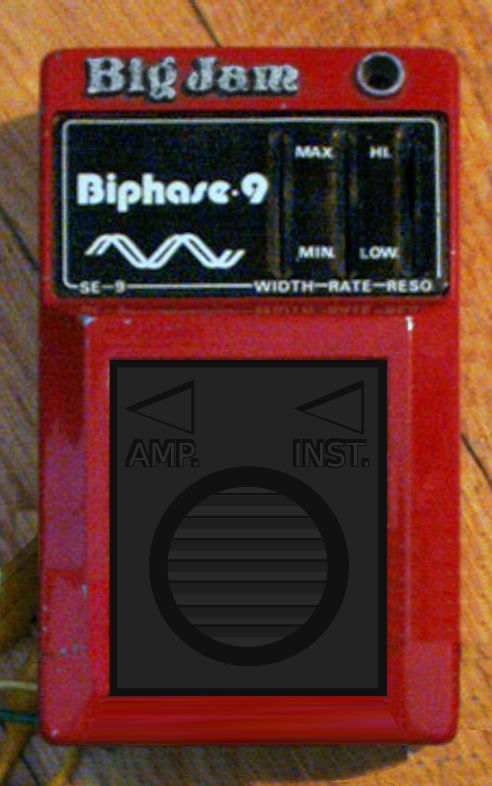
BigJam SE-9 Biphase Phaser

- SE-1 Phaser - Phaser
- SE-2 Spit Wah - Auto Wah - It is a close clone to the Mutron III filter. For this reason and because it is a rare pedal it is becoming increasingly sought after since the 2010s.
- SE-3 Compressor - Compressor
- SE-4 Octave - Octaver
- SE-5 Flanjam Flanger - Flanger
- SE-6 Graphic Equalizer - 6 band analog EQ band sliders for 100 Hz, 200 Hz, 400 Hz, 800 Hz, 1.6 kHz, 3.2 kHz
- SE-7 Delay Machine - Delay/Reverb with Mode switch for Delay/(Rev)erb, Delay, Repeat, (Bal)ance
- SE-8 Distortion - Distortion
- SE-9 Biphase Phaser - Dual Phaser with Width, Rate, and (Reso)nance sliders
- SE-10 Quartz Guitar Tuner - Tuner
- SE-11 Jazz Flanger - Flanger
- SE-12 Chorus - Chorus with Warp, Speed, Depth sliders
- SE-13 Space Driver - Boost/Overdrive with Expand, Drive, and Level sliders
- SE-14 Stop Noise - Noise Gate with Sensitivity and Decay slider controls
- SE-15 "Unknown" -
- SE-16 "Unknown" -
- SE-17 "Unknown" -
- SE-18 Parametric EQ - Parametric Eq
- SE-XP Pulse Regulator Power Supply - A Power supply that powered up to 5 Big Jam Effects units via 9 volt dc supply and cables.
- SE-PB Pedal Board - Self-enclosed pedal board that included the SE-XP Pulse Power Supply and room for up to 5 Big Jam Effects in a flight case design with power cables and linking audio jacks connections.

== See also ==
- Multivox Premier
