= Viscount (musical instrument manufacturer) =

Italian musical instrument manufacturer, specializing in organs

Viscount International SpA
- Company type: Public
- Founded: 13 June 1969
- Founder: Marcello Galanti
- Headquarters: Mondaino, Italy
- Products: Musical Instruments
- Website: www.viscountinstruments.it

Viscount International SpA (Viscount) is a musical instrument manufacturer based in Mondaino, Italy. The brand Viscount was registered in 1969 by Marcello Galanti, but the company was established in the late 19th century by his forefather Antonio Galanti. After 1969 Viscount's primary focus has been on classic organs and digital pianos. Several alternative brands were formed in the 2000s to aim at expanding into other markets: VERSE and Voice Systems, respectively, for the high and low-end Pro-Audio markets and Physis for digital organs using Viscount's physical modeling technology. The company also used the Oberheim brand for several years, to market vintage organs, synthesizers and guitar effects. Currently, Viscount's manufacturing and R&D activity is based in Italy. The company has been continuously owned by the Galanti family since its inception.

== History ==
=== Twentieth century ===
The company history begins in the late 19th century when Antonio Galanti, musician and craftsman, founded a small accordion production facility in Mondaino, Italy. This became a family business and in subsequent years was enlarged: in 1917 the first Galanti factory was established in Mondaino and afterwards the activity was inherited by his son Egidio. Along with the accordions, many guitars were produced under the Galanti Electro Music brand. Between 1910 and 1920 Domenico, Egidio and Robusto moved to the US to import accordions to the Americas. During these years some patents were issued in the USA. After 1955 the Galanti brothers returned to Italy to establish their business back in their homeland. With the times changing, the production shifted to new instruments and in 1959 one of Egidio's sons, Marcello, began the production of electronic instruments, starting, in 1969 his own business called Intercontinental Electronics SpA and the Viscount brand name, mainly devoted to electronic organs. As is the case with most of the musical instrument manufacturers of the central Adriatic coast, such as Eko, Farfisa, FBT, the production included a wide variety of instruments through the years - such as electric guitars, home organs, accordions, synthesizers and loudspeakers.

=== Today ===
In 1999, Marcello Galanti died, leaving his business to his son Mauro and daughter Loriana, who renewed the product catalogue and expanded their R&D personnel including a new R&D Lab based in Ancona, Italy. During these years Viscount used the Oberheim brand to market new products: the MC master keyboard series, the OB-12 digital synthesizer and the OB-3 vintage organ line (now called DB organs and marketed directly under the Viscount brand) and the GM-1000 guitar processor. New digital pianos were also introduced using the brand Galileo. At the same time, the business over the past two decades has been focused primarily on classic organs. In 2007 Viscount launched a new series of digital amplified loudspeakers, under the VERSE brand, developed by a new R&D team, with the D:SIDER line being the higher-end products and embedding together a class D digital amplifier, a DSP and a remote control system. In 2008 Viscount gave birth to a new brand, Physis, for the production of a new generation of classic organs, based on a new sound synthesis technology, physical modeling, patented in Italy and other countries. This synthesis technology, although common for the emulation of other musical instruments (such as guitars and brass instruments) is at the time of writing the only known implementation for the emulation of organ pipes.

== Products ==
Discontinued products

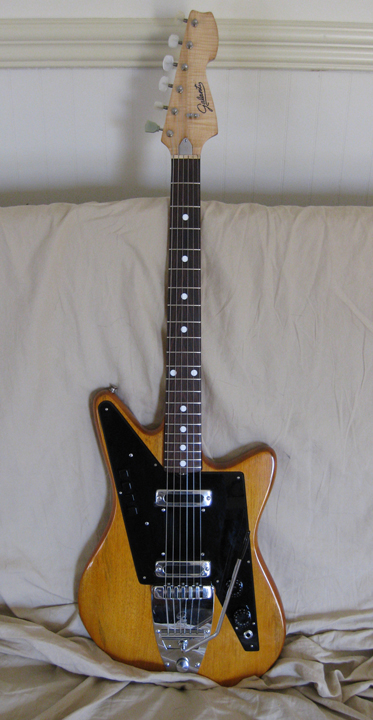
Galanti Grand Prix guitar

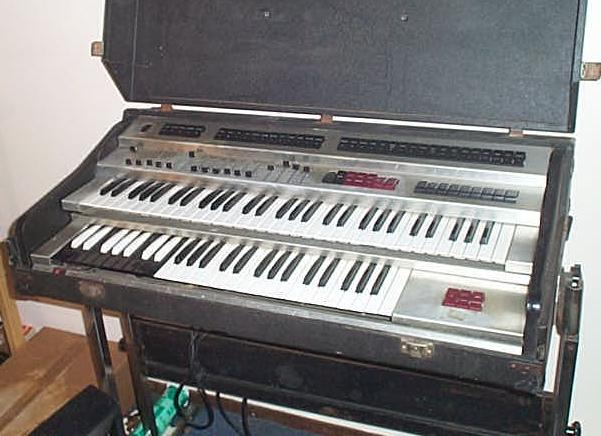
Viscount Intercontinental (combo organ)

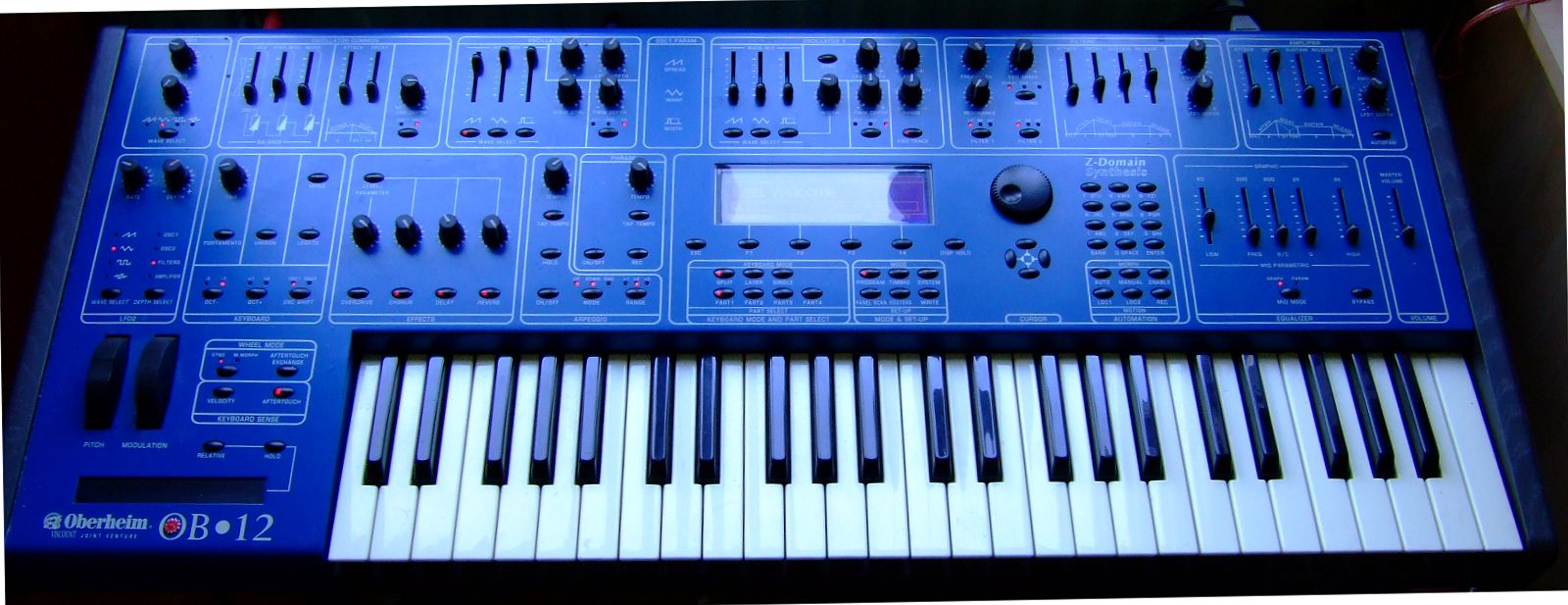
Oberheim OB12 (synthesizer)

=== Discontinued products ===
Most notable instruments among the first half of the 20th century are:

- Dominator accordion series
- Super Classic accordions
- Galanti Electro Music guitars (such as the Grand-Prix series)

More recently, notable discontinued products are:

- the Oberheim OB12 Virtual Analog synthesizer
- the MC series of master keyboards
- the OB-3, D9, OB3^{2} vintage organ series (now superseded by the DB series)
- the first Prestige series of classic organs (now superseded by a new Prestige series)
- the Eclipse Digital amplified loudspeakers, an early attempt to the digital amplified loudspeaker concept

=== Recent products ===
The company started producing electric organs (home-organs, neon tonewheel organs, church organs, etc.) since the late 1960s. Many of these organs were marketed in the US and UK with different brands, such as Baldwin, Vox and Fujiha. In the 2000s the company launched new products and brands and developed new technologies, some of which are covered by patents. Some of these products are:

- the Unico line of physical modeling organs, using Physis technology
- VERSE digital loudspeakers
- Alpha digital mixers, an attempt to bring digital mixers to the low-end market
Current products

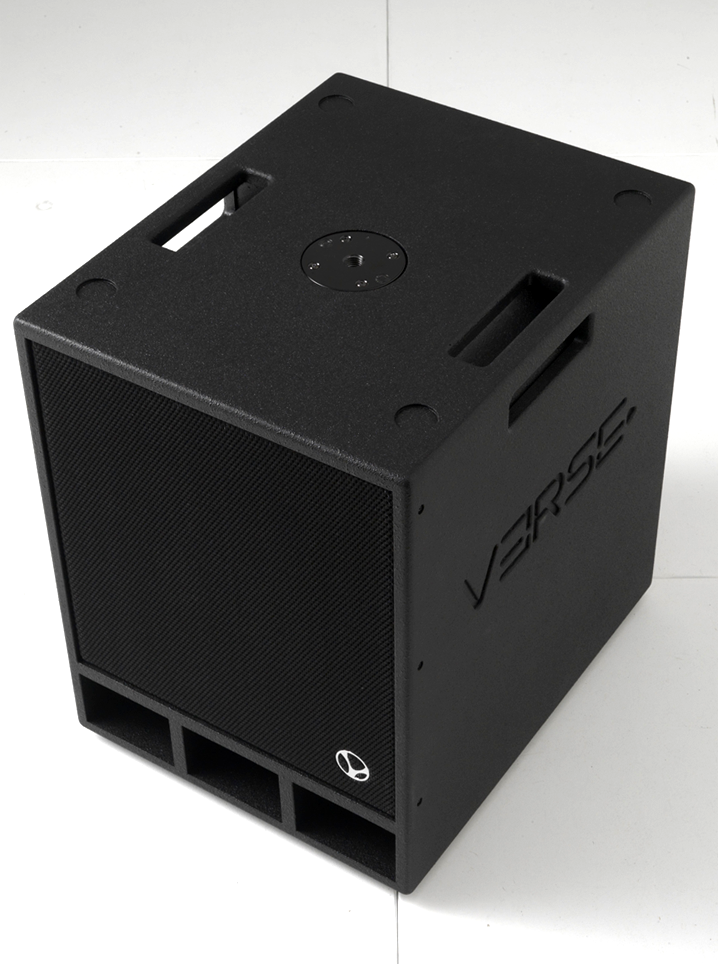
VERSE D:SUB speaker

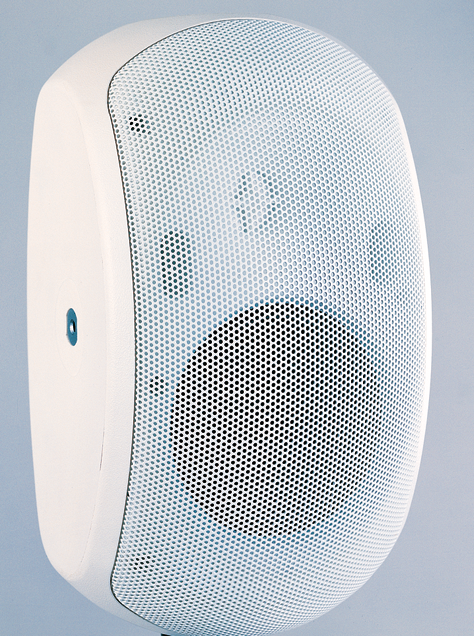
Voice Systems Bee T-Five speaker

A screenshot from the D:SP Editor for VERSE speakers

==== Physis ====
Physis refers to the physical modeling technology developed by Viscount. Two series of organs have been produced with Physis technology at the time of this writing: Unico and Unico CL. The latter being a stripped-down version of the former. Unico organs are based only on physical modeling synthesis, hence they no longer use sampling technology, currently the most common synthesis technology for musical instruments. Unico organs also feature a Linux-powered core controller, hence it is capable of managing USB devices such as USB sticks, and several DSPs for the sound synthesis. With these new products, Viscount seems to have gained back some popularity in the US, after a demo tour featuring Cameron Carpenter as a player.

==== VERSE ====
VERSE is a trademark used by Viscount to market a series of loudspeakers meant for sound reinforcement in big halls, theaters, live stages and so on. All VERSE speakers are equipped with an onboard digital amplifier and a DSP. They also feature a remote connection system based on RS-485 meant to create a daisy-chain network to control and set up the speakers. A PC editor software, called D:SP, is needed in order to control the speakers and adjust their parameters. Current VERSE products are:

- D:SIDER and D:SUB speakers, equipped with a DSP unit and a digital amplifier.
- INSIDER MkII and SUB speakers, equipped with a digital amplifier.

==== Voice Systems ====
Voice Systems was the first of the aforementioned brands to be created, in 2000, and sells products for the low-end market, specifically: small live gigs, light sound reinforcement systems for speeches or small venues. Under this brand many unique products were or are sold: tiny mixers, such as Micropad, quarter-rack reverb units, 8-channel digital mixers, compact all-in-one systems (e.g. Factotum).

== Notable users of Viscount products ==
- Bruce Katz
- Joey DeFrancesco (who has his own Signature model of Legend organ)
- Cameron Carpenter (who plays Physis organs)
- Martin Mans (who plays Physis organs)
- Rick Wakeman (who played Viscount pianos)
- Iglesia ni Cristo (which being played during Hymn Singing of Congregation at Selected Chapels accompanied by Choir Members)
- Christian Lorenz, Rammstein (who played Oberheim MC 1000 in Reise, Reise tour)
- Anneke van Giersbergen, former singer of The Gathering (who uses Oberheim MC 3000 in her home studio)
- Jay Metarri, (collaborations with Lady Gaga, Michael Jackson, Madonna, U2, Justin Bieber, One Direction, Lana Del Rey)
- A Viscount Sonus 60 organ was installed at Nationals Park in Washington, D.C., in late September 2017

== See also ==
- Physical modeling
- Class D Amplifier
- Sound reinforcement system
- List of Italian Companies
