= Guild Guitar Company =

United States-based guitar manufacturer

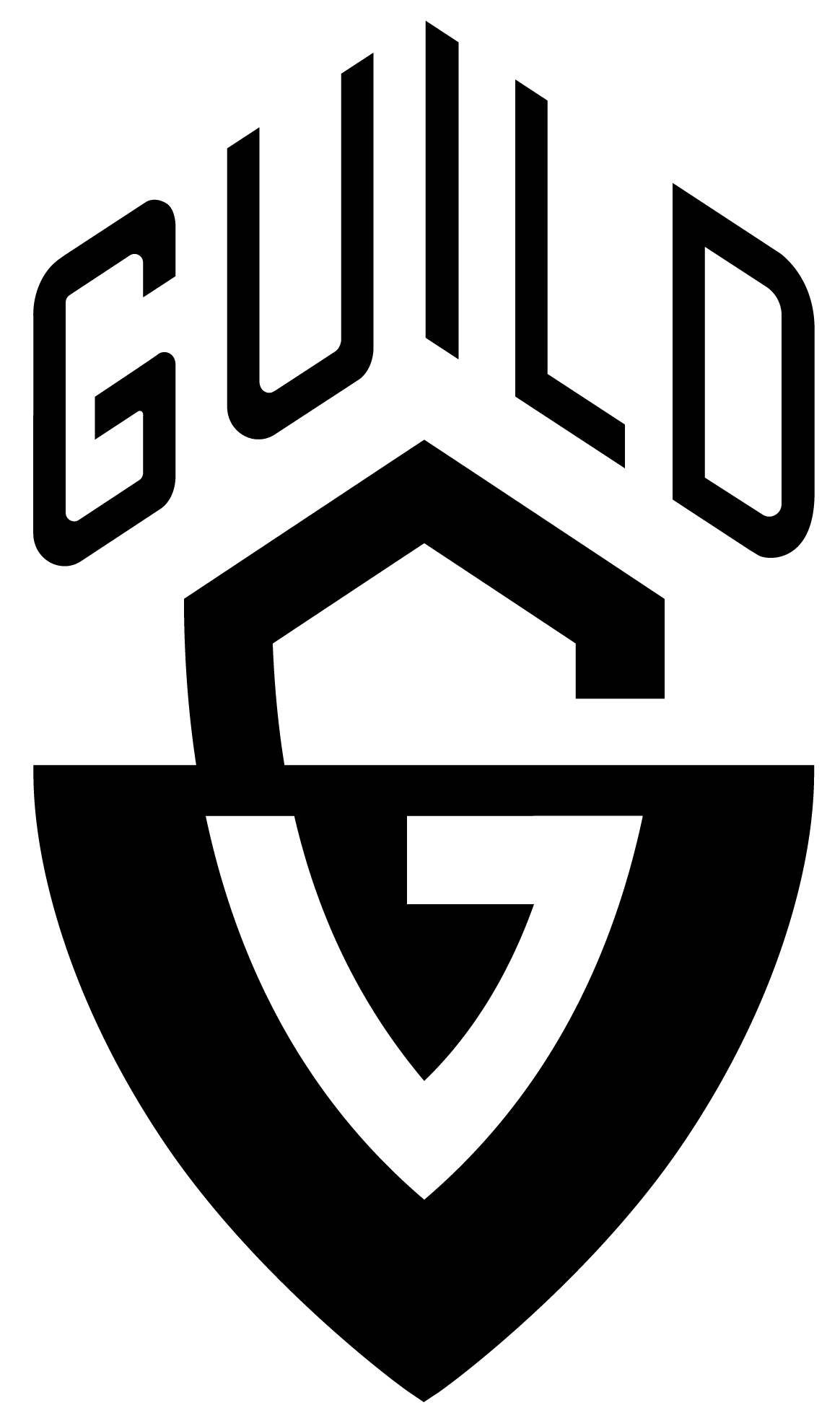
- Type: Subsidiary
- Industry: Musical instrument
- Founded: 1952; 74 years ago
- Founder: Alfred Dronge
- Headquarters: Oxnard, California, United States
- Area served: Worldwide
- Products: Acoustic, electric guitars, bass guitars
- Parent: Yamaha
- Website: guildguitars.com

The Guild Guitar Company is a United States–based guitar manufacturer founded in 1952 by Alfred Dronge, a guitarist and music-store owner. The brand name currently exists as a brand under Córdoba Music Group. In February 2023, The Yamaha Guitar Group acquired Córdoba Music Group.

== Origin ==
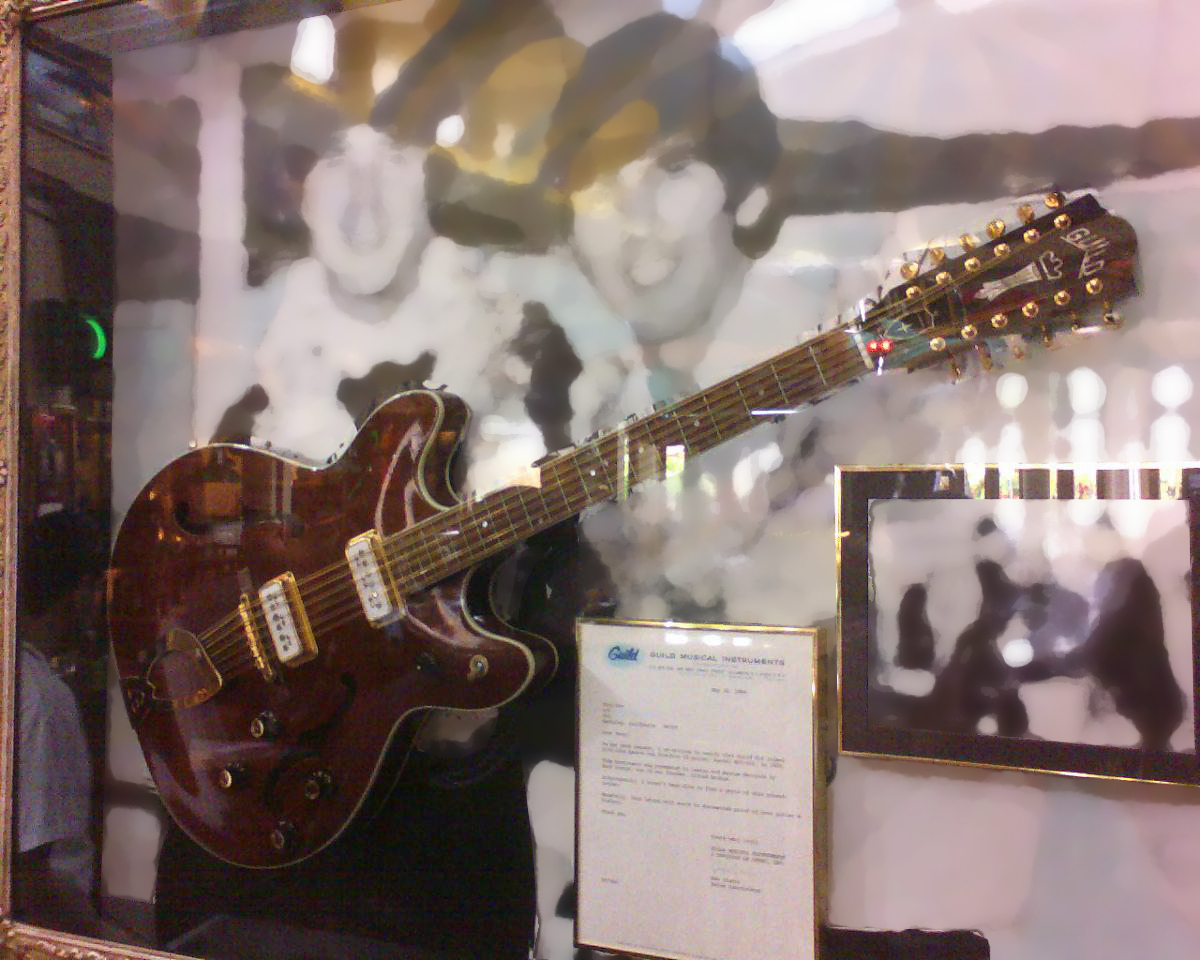
Beatle John Lennon's 1966 Guild Starfire XII twelve-string

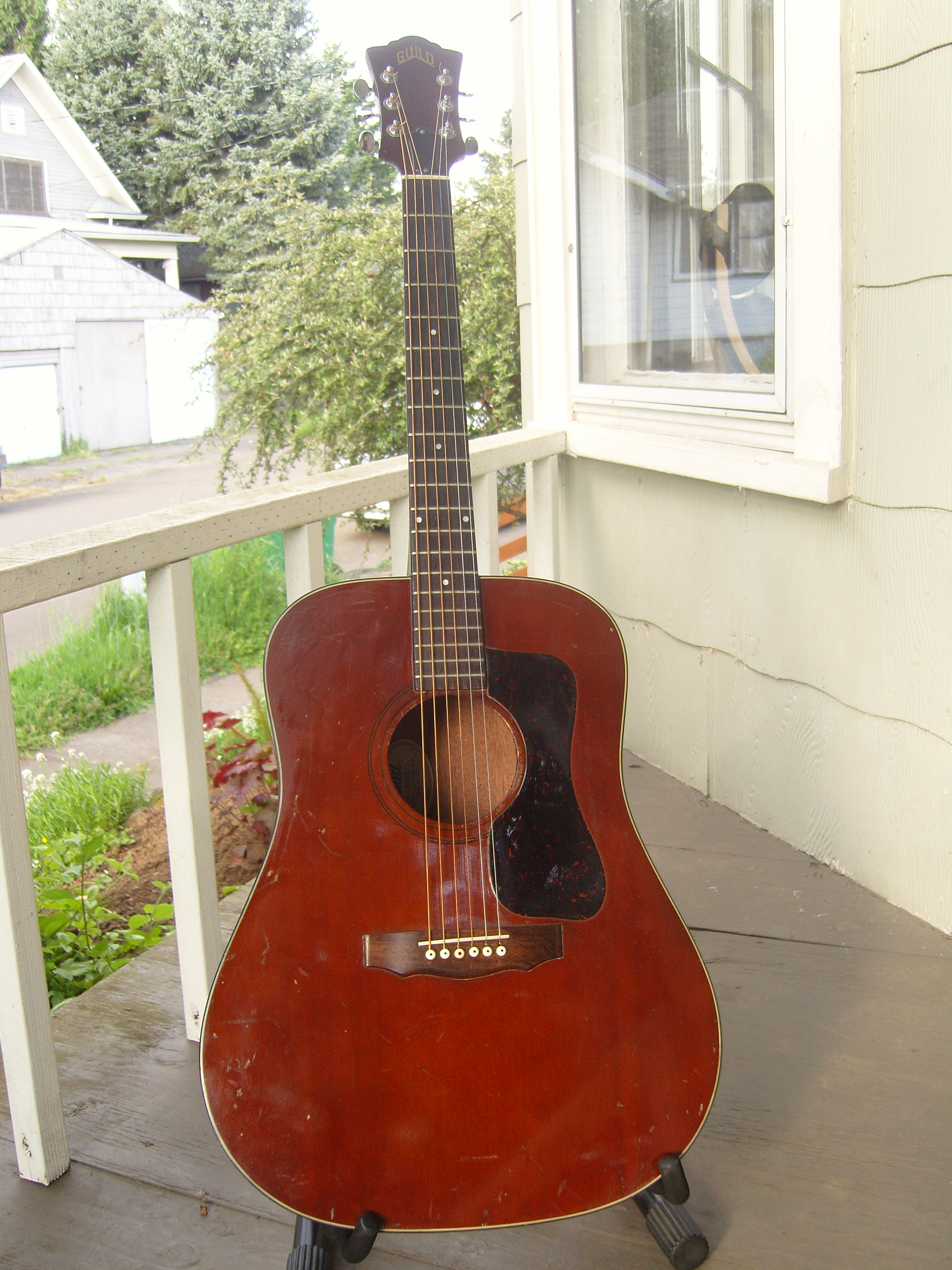
A 1979 Guild D25M

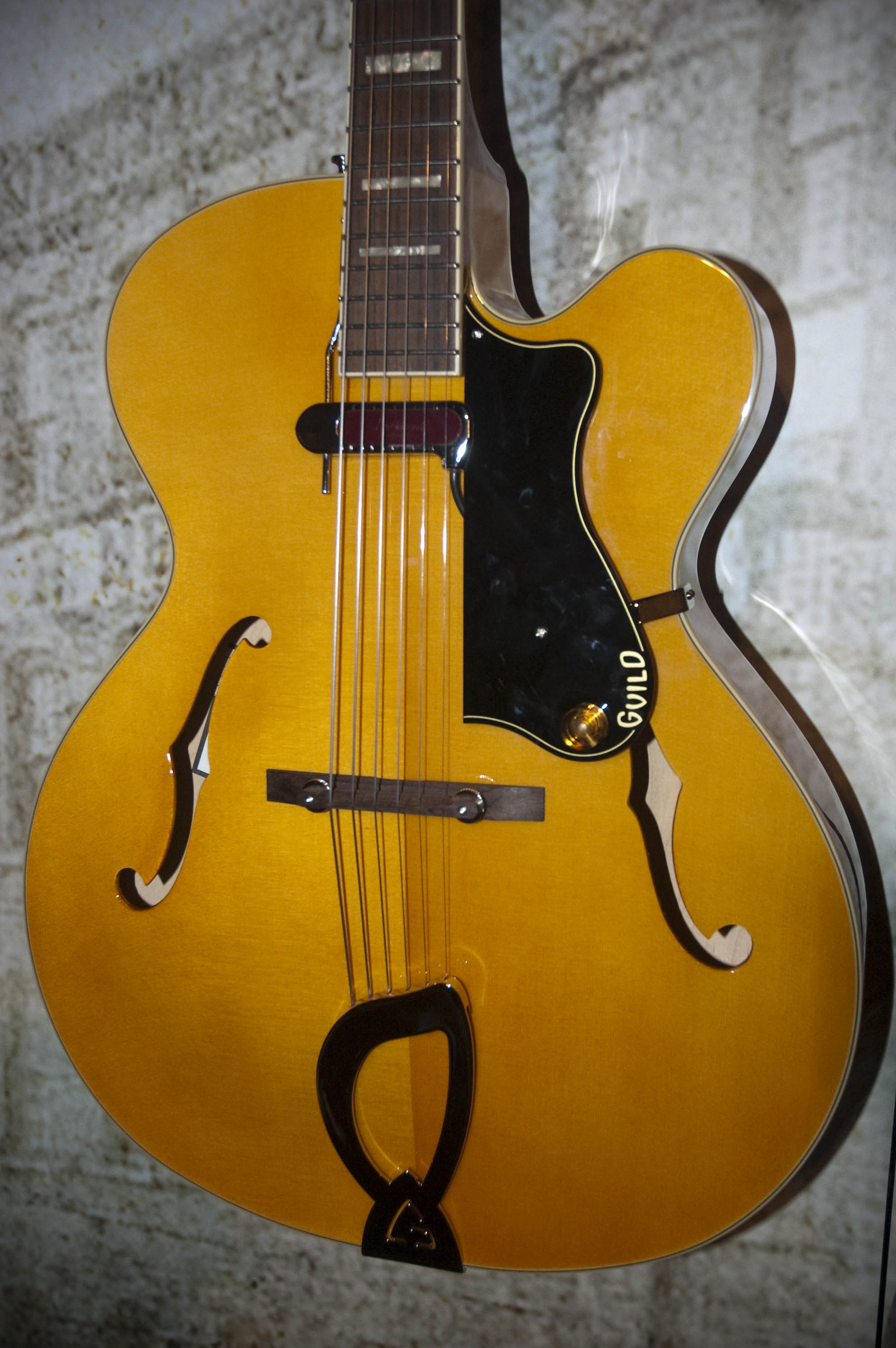
A-150 Savoy

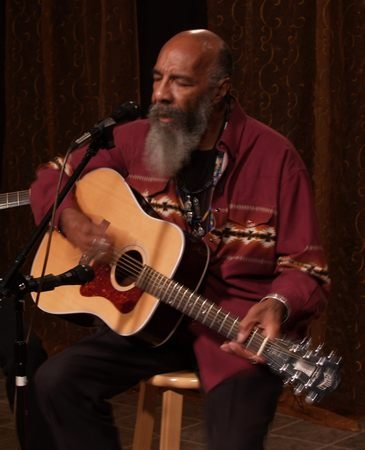
Richie Havens, who famously played a Guild at Woodstock, performing in 2006 with a D40

The first Guild workshop was located in Manhattan, New York, where Dronge (who soon took over full ownership) focused on electric and acoustic archtop jazz guitars. Much of the initial workforce consisted of former Epiphone workers who lost their jobs following their 1951 strike and the subsequent relocation of the company from Queens to Philadelphia. Rapid expansion forced the company to move to much larger quarters, on Newark St. in Hoboken, New Jersey, in the old R. Neumann Leathers building. The advent of the folk music craze in the early 1960s had shifted the company into production of an important line of acoustic folk and blues guitars, including a dreadnought series (D-40, D-50 and, later, D-55) that competed successfully with Martin's D-18 and D-28 models, and jumbo and Grand Concert "F" models that were particularly popular with blues guitarists such as Dave Van Ronk. Notable also was the Guild 12-string guitar, which used a Jumbo "F" body and dual truss rods in the neck to produce a workhorse instrument with a deep, rich tone distinctive from the chimier twelve-strings put out by Martin.

The company continued to expand, and was sold to the Avnet Corporation, which moved production to Westerly, Rhode Island, in 1966. As the folk scene quieted, a new generation of folk-rockers took Guild guitars on stage. The most notable Guild performance of that era was on the D-40 that Richie Havens played when he opened Woodstock in 1969.

During the 1960s, Guild moved aggressively into the electric guitar market, successfully promoting the Starfire line of semi-acoustic (Starfire I, II and III) and semi-solid (Starfire IV, V and VI) guitars and basses. A number of early West-Coast psychedelic bands used these instruments, notably guitarists Bob Weir and Jerry Garcia and bassist Phil Lesh of Grateful Dead, as well as Jefferson Airplane's bassist Jack Casady. Instrument maker Alembic started their transition from sound and recording work to instrument building by modifying Lesh & Casady's Starfire basses. The rare S-200 Thunderbird solid body electric was used by Muddy Waters and the Lovin' Spoonful's Zal Yanovsky. Inspired by seeing Muddy Waters, Ross Hannaford acquired a Thunderbird, which he used extensively in the period that he played in popular Australian 1970s band Daddy Cool.

Guild also successfully manufactured the first dreadnought acoustic guitar with a "cut-away" in its lower shoulder to allow better access to the upper frets, the D40-C. In 1972, under Guild's new president Leon Tell, noteworthy guitarist/designer Richard "Rick" Excellente came up with the design. It is still made, copied by virtually every guitar manufacturer.

The decline of the folk and acoustic market in the later 1970s and early 1980s put severe economic pressure on the company. While instrument specialists generally concede that quality suffered at other American competitors, Guild models from the 1970s and 1980s are considered still made to the high-quality standards that the Westerly plant was known for. In the 1980s, Guild introduced a series of superstrat solid bodies including models such as the Flyer, Aviator, Liberator and Detonator, the Tele-style T-200 and T-250 (endorsed by Roy Buchanan) and the Pilot Bass, available in fretted, fretless, and 4- and 5-string versions. These guitars were the first Guild instruments to bear slim pointed headstocks, sometimes called "pointy droopy", "duck foot" and "cake knife" for their distinctive shape.

== Fender era ==
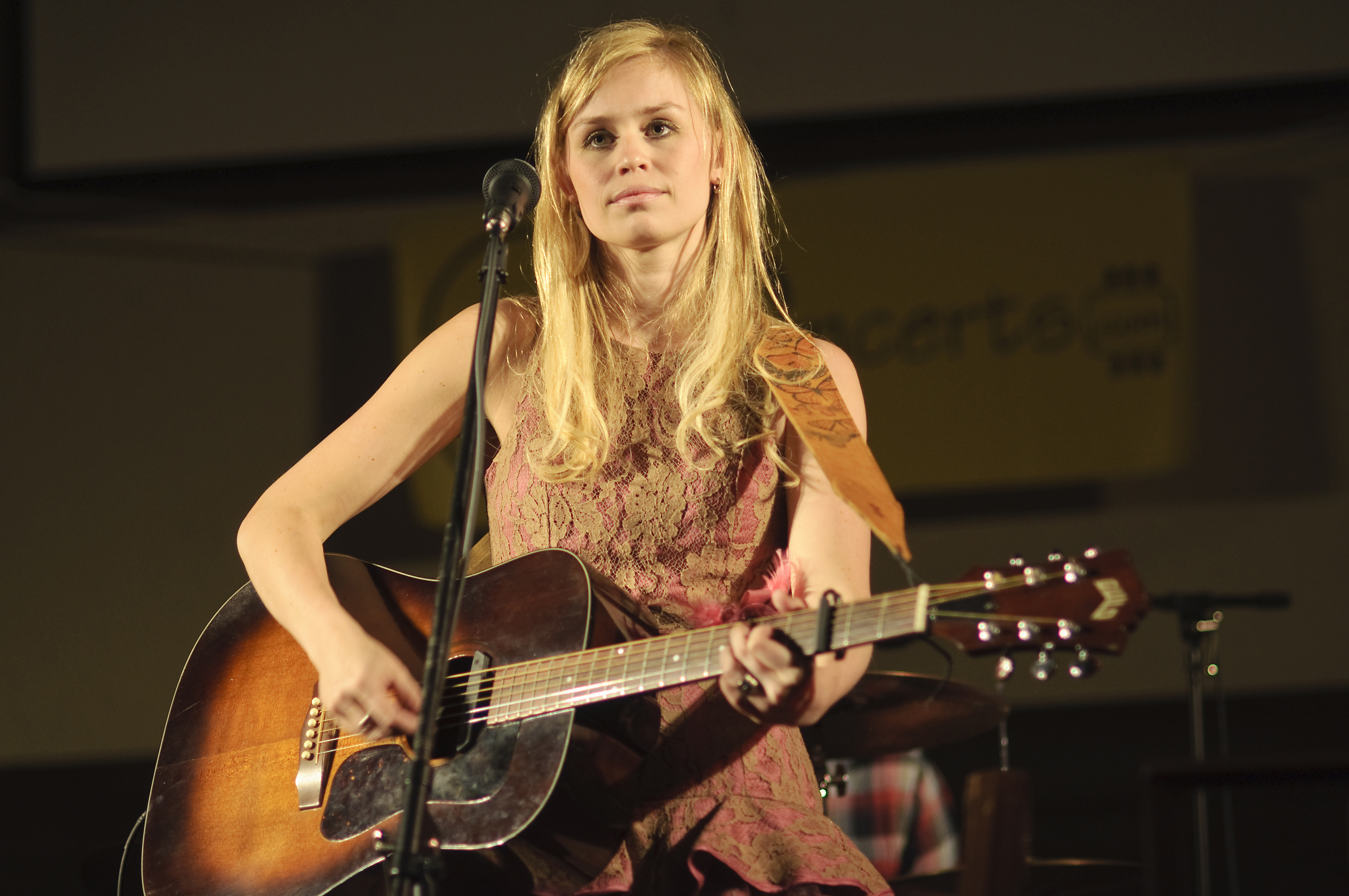
Swedish singer Sofia Talvik playing a Guild in 2010.

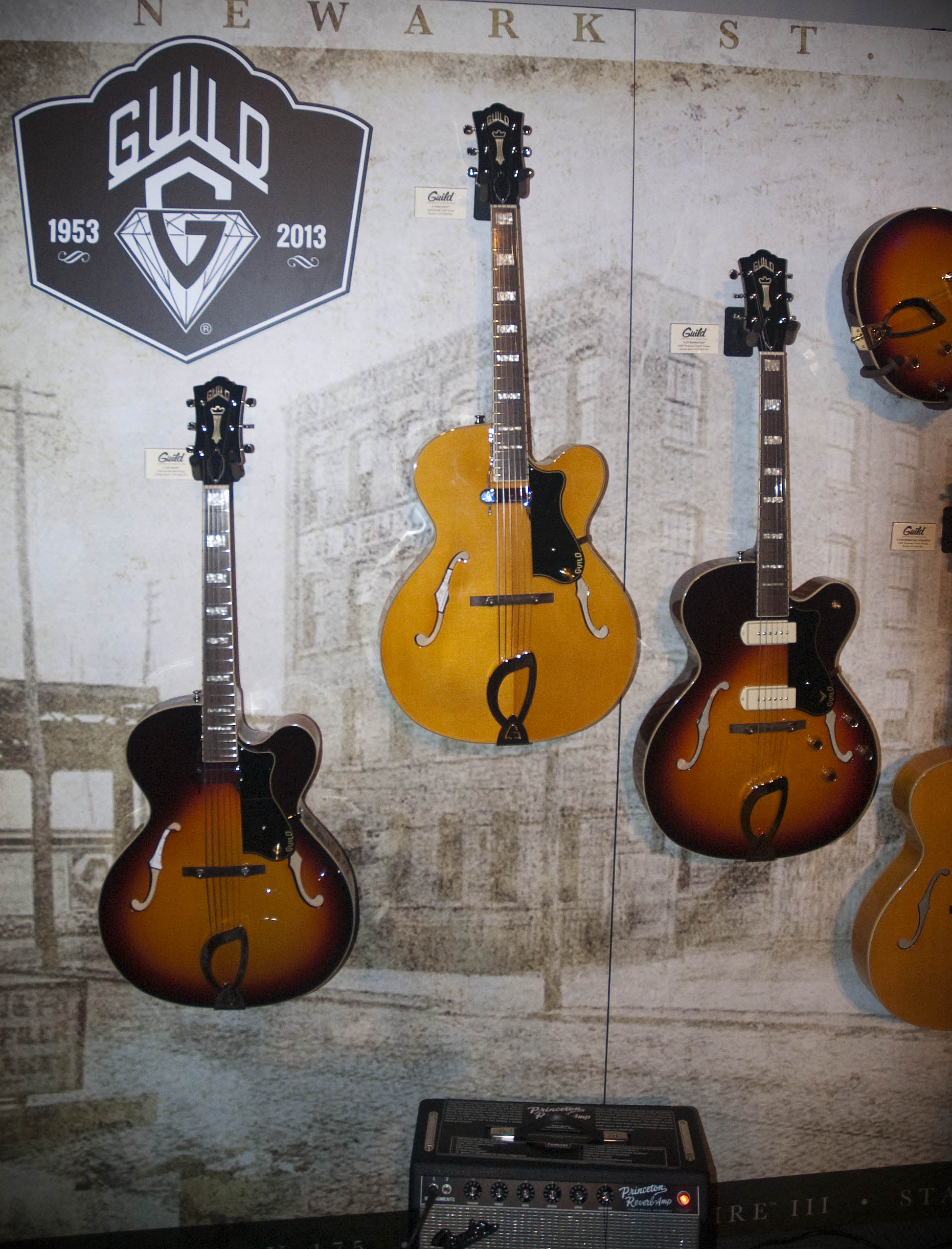
2013 Guild hollowbodies.

After several changes in management and ownership, Guild was eventually purchased by the Fender Musical Instruments Corporation in 1995. In late 2001, Fender decided to shut down the Westerly factory (citing difficulty in climate control and factory production workflow as primary motives) and moved all Guild production to its factory in Corona, California. To ease the Corona facility (which had only made electric guitars up to this point) into making archtop and acoustic guitars, the Westerly factory artisans and workers prepared guitar 'kits' that they shipped to Corona. These kits were near-complete production guitars that only needed finishing and final assembly before being sent to retailers.

Production in Corona was short-lived, however, as Fender acquired the assets of Washington-based Tacoma Guitar Company in 2004, and moved all American Guild acoustic guitar production to Tacoma, Washington and discontinued production of US-made Guild electric guitars completely.

In 2008, Fender again moved Guild when it acquired Kaman Music Corporation and its small production facility in New Hartford, Connecticut, where hand production of all US-made Guilds resumed in a manner consistent with other high-end, boutique guitar builders. The New Hartford Guild facility began production in early 2009, starting with the top-end D-55 and F-50 models. Production quickly ramped up to include most of the popular Traditional Series acoustic guitar models. Acoustic-Electric versions of these models were also made available. Starting with 2012 models, all US-built Guild Traditional Series guitars were available in right- and left-handed configurations.

In 2011, Traditional Series models' were improved by means of a new DTAR pickup system (DTAR-MS, for 'multi-source'), which allows blending between an internal microphone element and an under-saddle transducer. Previous DTAR configurations only included an under-saddle transducer. Also, hard shell case material was upgraded to a high-end, faux alligator skin material with crushed velvet interior padding, closely resembling the Custom Shop guitar cases that Guild had used when its Custom Shop was open.

In late 2010, Guild released its Standard Series acoustic guitars, which were US-built guitars (still manufactured in the New Hartford facility) that were based on models from their top-end Traditional Series. Differences in ornamentation and instrument finish options made them more affordable. Standard Series models included the F-30, F-30R, F-50, D-40, D-50, and the return of the F-212XL 12-string model. All Standard Series models featured red spruce bracing, satin mahogany necks, and bone saddles, nuts, and bridge pins, but have nondescript grade wood and different ornamentation than their Traditional Series counterparts.

In 2011, cutaway acoustic-electric versions of all Standard Series models were released. These guitars featured venetian cutaways and a DTAR 18V under-saddle pickup system. These models can be identified by the 'CE' suffix at the end of the guitar's model number.

The New Hartford facility had also created a new line of specialty, limited edition guitars, referred to as the GSR Series. The GSR designation stands for "Guild Special Run." This series was first revealed to Guild dealers at Guild's dealer-only factory tour in mid-2009 called the "Guild Summit Retreat". These models featured unique takes on classic Guild Traditional Series models. GSR models include the F-20 (figured Cocobolo), F-30R (master-grade Rosewood), F-40 (figured Cocobolo), F-50 (figured Koa), and D-50 (figured Cocobolo), and Guild's only electric guitar to be produced since 2003, the GSR Starfire VI (only 20 produced). Each of these instruments features unique designs, wood selection, ornamentation, and had extremely limited production numbers.

== Córdoba era ==
In the late spring/early summer of 2014, Fender's New Hartford Guild facility closed its doors as the Fender Musical Instrument Corporation (FMIC) prepared to sell off the Guild brand. Córdoba Music Group (CMG), based in Santa Monica, California, stepped in and purchased the Guild brand rights and began setting up a new manufacturing facility in Oxnard, California, led by Gibson alum Ren Ferguson as the VP of Manufacturing and R&D. Córdoba started production in late 2015, releasing its first models (M-20 and D-20) in early 2016. Higher-end models like the D-55 were released in late 2017.

== Guild import brands ==
In the early 1970s, Guild began to form import brands for acoustic and electric guitars made in Asia. There were a total of three import brands: Madeira, Burnside, and DeArmond.

Madeira Acoustic and Electric Guitars were import guitars based on existing Guild designs. They are characterized by their unique pickguard shape and differing headstock.

Similarly to Madeira, Burnside Electric Guitars were Guild electric guitar designs (typically of superstrat delineation) manufactured outside the United States. The headstocks on these guitars read "Burnside by Guild." Both brands were discontinued in the early 1990s.

After Fender purchased Guild in the mid-1990s, reissues of some Guild electric guitars were manufactured in Korea under the DeArmond brand name, which Fender also owned the rights to. Import reissue models included the Starfire, X155, T400, M-75 Bluesbird, S-73, and Pilot Bass series. On the front of the headstock, these instruments display the DeArmond logo above a modified version of Guild's Chesterfield logo. On early production versions, the truss rod cover is stenciled with the word 'Guild' stylized and the DeArmond reissue model number, and the back of the headstock is stenciled with 'DeArmond by Guild' above the guitar's serial number. Later production versions drop all references to the Guild brand name except for a modified Chesterfield headstock inlay on most models. The DeArmond line also included other less expensive models similar in design to the Guild reissues and manufactured in Indonesia. The DeArmond brand was discontinued in the early 2000s.

While not a discrete brand, in the early 2000s, FMIC created a new line of Guild acoustic guitars called the GAD-series, which stood for "Guild Acoustic Design." As with the other import lines, these guitars were based on past and present Guild acoustic guitar designs, but were built in China. All of these models were designated with a 'GAD' as a model prefix. These guitars featured poly finishes (as opposed to traditional nitrocellulose lacquer on US models) and nondescript wood grading. FMIC did not choose to create this line under a different brand name, but left it as a new series of guitars from Guild. This choice caused confusion for buyers, as it marked the first time that an import had actually donned the Guild brand name, which had previously only been used to describe US-made guitars. Because of this, it was no longer immediately clear if a Guild-branded guitar is a US-made model or an import, although the GAD models usually had unique ornamentation.

The 2011 GAD models brought new features, looks, and model numbers. These new GAD-series Guild guitars could be identified with a number 1 as the first number in the model number. For example, a US-built F-50R's GAD-level version would be called an F-150R. Similarly, a US-built F-512 would be an F-1512 as a GAD version.

With Córdoba taking over as owners of the Guild brand, as of May, 2015, the GAD line-up was discontinued, but two newly formed lines, Westerly Collection (acoustics) and Newark Street (electrics) were revealed, which also aimed to pay homage Guild's production history that took place at those locations (with the Newark Street address alluding to a link with the Hoboken factory). The Westerly Collection line-up includes a variety of guitars made with solid wood tops/laminate sides and body; and, solid wood tops/solid wood sides and solid wood backs.

== Notable users of Guild guitars ==
- Jerry Garcia
- George Benson
- Richie Havens – D40
- Steve Harley - JF-55
- Tom Fogerty – Starfire III, Starfire VI
- Duane Eddy
- Lera Lynn – Starfire III, T-50
- Brian May – F512
- John Renbourn – D-55 (ca. 1975–85)
- Kim Thayil – S-100, S-300
- Dave Davies – Starfire III, Starfire IV
- John Denver – F-212XL, F-512, F-612, F-50
- Tom Smothers – D-55
- Prescott Niles – M-85
- Dave Gonzalez - X-550
- Roger Hodgson (Supertramp) - F-512
- Peter Hammill - M-75CS

== Bibliography ==
- Acoustic Guitars: The Illustrated Encyclopedia. New York: Chartwell Books. 2011. ISBN 978-0-7858-3571-4.
- Hans Moust (1995) The Guild Guitar Book. Hal Leonard Corporation. Roger Hodgson - F-512, Ted Kaplan (aka Teddy Rose) - F212/F412xl
