= Multivox Premier =

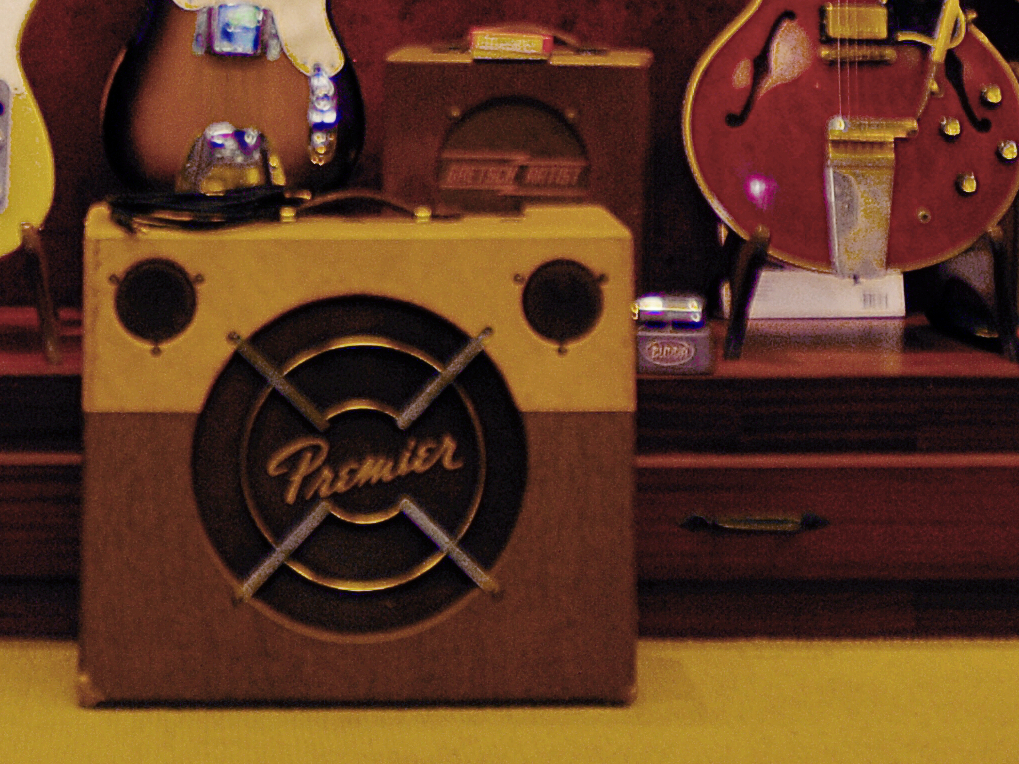
Multivox Premier Model 71 (late-1950s model)

Multivox Premier was a guitar and amplifier brand of New York-based retailer/wholesaler, Peter Sorkin Music Company (Sorkin Music) and its manufacturing subsidiary Multivox founded in the mid-1940s. Multivox Premier products included: guitars, amplification equipment for guitar, bass and other instruments, PA amplifiers and Hi-fi stereo amplifiers.

In modern times, many Premier amplifier models are sought after by blues harmonica players for use with their microphones to achieve a distorted and "fattened" tone, such as the Twin 8 and Model 50. The Premier Model 90 Reverberation unit was a direct competitor with the Fender Reverb Unit during the early to mid 1960s. They can still be found in the arsenal of many guitarists.

Some Premier guitars were fitted with DeArmond pickups manufactured by Rowe Industries of Toledo, Ohio.

== See also ==
- Multivox
