= Galanti =

Galanti Grand Prix
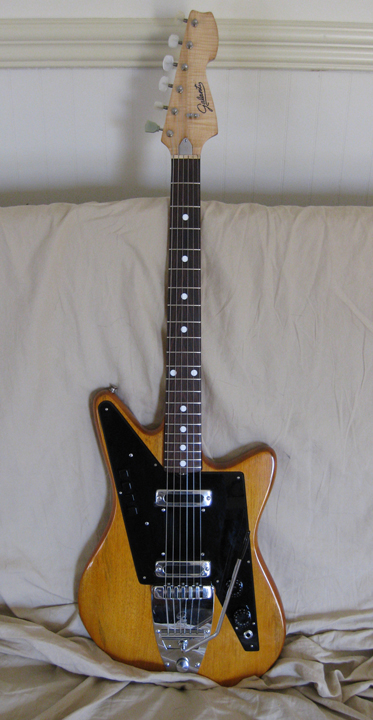
- Manufacturer: Galanti
- Period: 1959–1968

Construction
- Body type: Solid, Double Cut
- Neck joint: Bolt-on
- Scale: 25.5"

Woods
- Body: mahogany
- Neck: Maple
- Fretboard: Rosewood

Hardware
- Bridge: Roller tremolo
- Pickup(s): 3 or 2 single-coils

Galanti Electro Music was an accordion and guitar manufacturer from 1917 until the late 1970s.

== History ==
Antonio Galanti started the Galanti accordion factory with his three sons Domenico, Egidio and Robusto in the small village of Mondaino Italy. Galanti earned his living by traveling throughout Italy showcasing his Merry-Go-Round, while continuing to develop the first Galanti accordion in 1890. The first Galanti accordions saw production in 1917. It was not until 1920 when a significant number of Italians had immigrated to the United States that the Galanti brothers Domenico and Robusto saw an opportunity to grow and expand the company and started exporting the Galanti brand to New York City. Ahlborn Galanti started making classical organs during the late 1970s and subsequently founded General Music or GEM. Similarly Marcello Galanti founded Intercontinental Electronics, later known as Viscount International to design and manufacture electronic organs after leaving his brothers in 1969.

== Acclaim ==
Galanti produced a successful line of accordions, with its Super Dominator model leading the way in overall quality. An advertisement for the Super Dominator read, "This sensitive musical instrument will outperform any other comparable accordion. It is the supreme achievement of the Galanti artisans... the culmination of a half-century of musical craftsmanship." Chris Saccheri of www.letspolka.com writes, "This was an excellent accordion and one of the world's best during its time." Galanti guitars were also recognized for their craftsmanship and used widely by professionals at the time in Italy.

== The Rock Era ==
In the 1950s, rock and roll emerged as the dominant force in music, and the accordion's popularity saw a dramatic decline. Like many instrument makers, Galanti responded to this cultural change by adding electric guitars and keyboards to its product line.
