= Archtop guitar =

Type of steel-stringed acoustic or semi-acoustic guitar

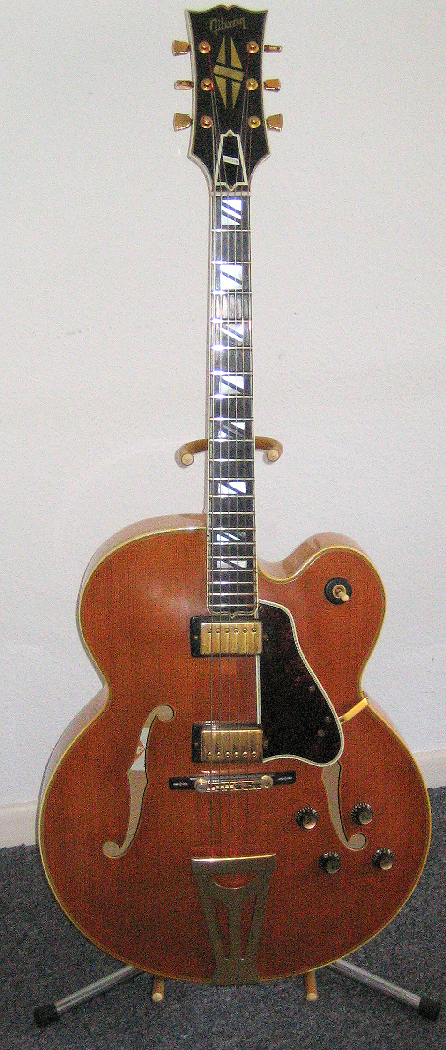
- The Gibson Super 400 CES, an electric archtop

String instrument
- Classification: String

Related instruments
- Acoustic guitar; Electric guitar

Builders
- Gibson, Gretsch, Epiphone

An archtop guitar is a hollow acoustic or semi-acoustic guitar with a full body and a distinctive arched top, whose sound is particularly popular with jazz, blues, and rockabilly players.

Typically, an archtop guitar has:

- Six strings
- An arched top and back, not a flat top and back
- A hollow body
- A moveable adjustable bridge
- F-holes similar to members of the violin family
- A rear-mounted tailpiece, stoptail bridge, or Bigsby vibrato tailpiece
- A set-in neck join at the 14th fret

== History ==
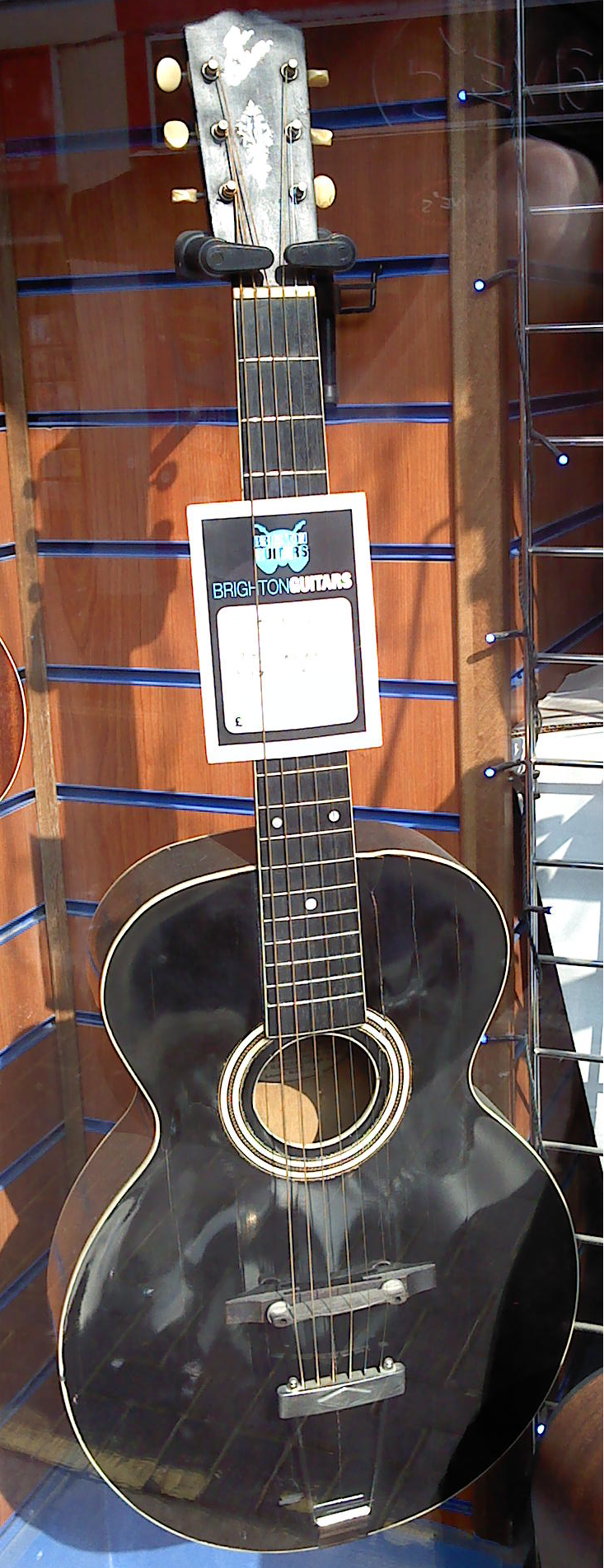
A 1918 "The Gibson" acoustic guitar, with a 13th fret neck join, circular sound hole, and floating bridge. This was a transitional model with no f-holes and a much smaller body than the classic archtop.

The archtop guitar is often credited to Orville Gibson, whose innovative designs led to the formation of the Gibson Mandolin-Guitar Mfg. Co, Ltd in 1902. His 1898 patent for a mandolin, which was also applicable to guitars according to the specifications, was intended to enhance "power and quality of tone." Among the features of this instrument were a violin-style arched top and back, each carved from a single piece of wood, and thicker in the middle than at the sides; sides carved to shape from a single block of wood; and a lack of internal "braces, splices, blocks, or bridges . . . which, if employed, would rob the instrument of much of its volume of tone." But Gibson was not the first to apply violin design principles to the guitar. Guitar maker A. H. Merrill, for example, patented in 1896 a very modern looking instrument "of the guitar and mandolin type . . . with egg-shaped hoop or sides and a graduated convex back and top." The instrument featured a metal tailpiece and teardrop shaped "f-holes," and strongly resembled the archtop guitars of the 1930s. James S. Back obtained patent #508,858 in 1893 for a guitar (which also mentions applicability to mandolins) that among other features included an arched top, which were produced under the Howe Orme name. Another transitional design is the parlor guitar fitted with a floating bridge and tailpiece. These inexpensive instruments, manufactured by companies such as Stella and Harmony, are associated with early blues musicians. The earliest Gibson designs (L1 to L3) introduced the arched top and increasing body sizes, but still had round or oval sound holes.

In 1922, Lloyd Loar was hired by the Gibson Company to redesign their instrument line in an effort to counter flagging sales, and in that same year the Gibson L5 was released to his design. Although the new instrument models flopped commercially and Loar left Gibson after only a couple of years, Gibson instruments signed by Loar are now prized. Perhaps the most revered instrument from this period is the F5 mandolin, but probably the more broadly influential was the L5 guitar, which remains in production to this day. The mature Gibson archtop guitar and its imitators are regarded as the quintessential "jazzbox."

Archtop guitars were subsequently made by many top American luthiers, notably John D'Angelico of New York and Jimmy D'Aquisto, William Wilkanowski, Charles Stromberg and Son in Boston, and by other major manufacturers, notably Gretsch and Epiphone. In Europe, companies such as Framus, Höfner, Hoyer and Hagström took up the manufacture of archtops. Archtop guitars were particularly adopted by both jazz and country musicians, and in big bands and swing bands.

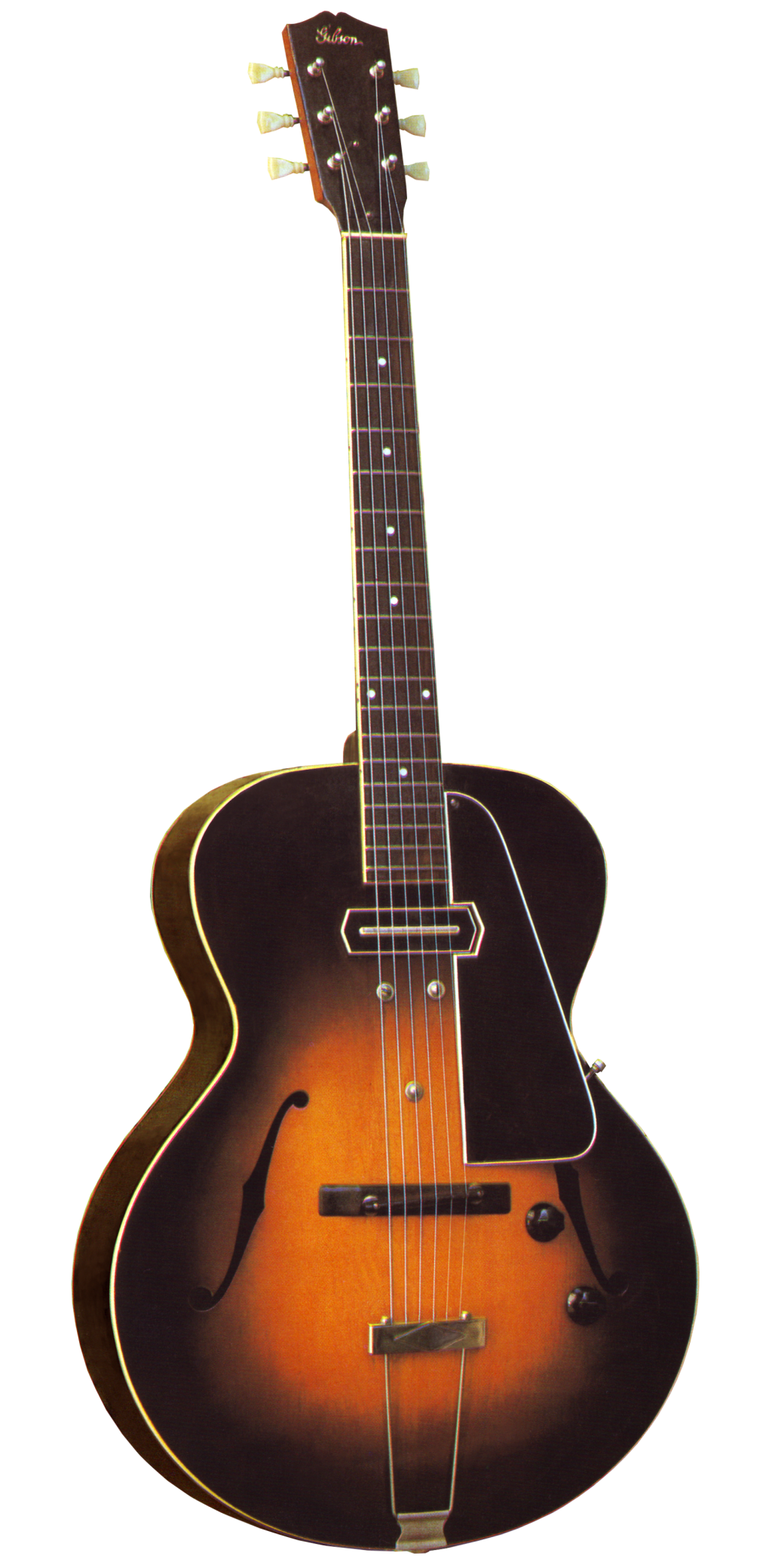
The Gibson ES-150, the first electric archtop (1936). Note the "Charlie Christian"-style pickup, a heavy affair mounted inside the guitar with three bolts through the top, used by Charlie Christian

Gibson's ES-150 guitar is generally recognized as the world's first commercially successful Spanish-style electric guitar. The ES stands for Electric Spanish, and it was designated 150 because it cost $150, along with an EH-150 amplifier and a cable. After its introduction in 1936, it immediately became popular in jazz orchestras of the period. Unlike the usual acoustic guitars utilized in jazz, it was loud enough to take a more prominent position in ensembles. Jazz guitarist Eddie Durham is usually credited with making the first electric guitar solo, but it was ES-150 player Charlie Christian who popularized the jazz guitar as a solo, not just a rhythm, instrument. The ES-150's top was not carved on the underside, making it unsuitable for acoustic use.

In 1951, Gibson released the L5CES, an L5 with a single cutaway body and two electric pickups, equally playable as either an acoustic guitar or an electric guitar. This innovation was immediately popular, and while purely acoustic archtop guitars such as the Gibson L-7C remain available to this day, they have become the exception. In 1958, the L5CES was redesigned with humbucking pickups; most, but certainly not all, subsequent archtop guitars conform loosely to the pattern set by this model. The electric archtop was particularly popular with jazz musicians Tal Farlow, Barney Kessel and Johnny Smith.

Other manufacturers introduced electric archtop guitars, notable examples including the Gretsch White Falcon and various Chet Atkins models. Some of these instruments have a distinctive "twangy" sound and were taken up by country music and early rock and roll artists such as Duane Eddy and Eddie Cochran. Similar models remain popular in rockabilly.

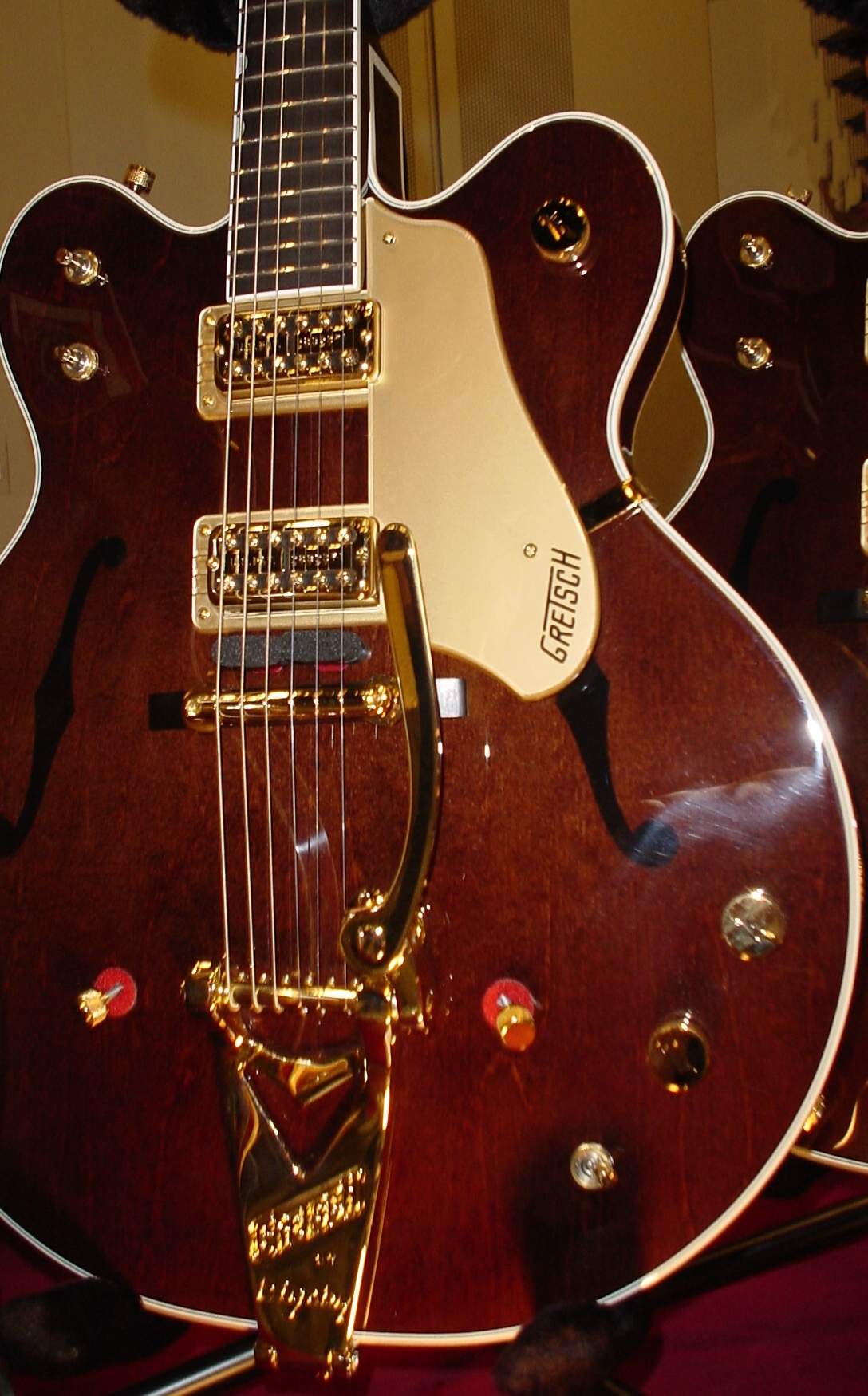
G6122-1962 Gretsch Chet Atkins Country Gentleman developed in the mid-1950s

Gibson's last innovation in archtop design was the creation, in 1955, of "thinline" models with a reduced body depth. Notable thinline models include the successful Gibson ES-335, introduced in 1958, as well as the Epiphone Casino, introduced after Epiphone was acquired in 1957 by CMI, Gibson's parent company. These were more feedback resistant, comfortable to hold and easier to play standing up. The first thinlines were hollow bodies. Later thinlines such as the ES-335, ES-345 and ES-355 were semi-hollow. Thinlines can be classed as semiacoustic guitars, although not all semiacoustic guitars have an arched top. Thinlines became popular with mainstream pop and rock artists during the 1960s. The ES-335 and similar guitars were taken up by, and remain steadfastly popular with, electric blues players; B. B. King's various "Lucilles" are based on the ES-335.

The 1970s and 1980s were a low point of interest in archtops, with many rock and pop (and some jazz and blues) players switching to solid body guitars. One manufacturer for this period was Robert Benedetto.

Interest in archtops was revived in the 1990s. Archtops had long been expensive instruments, with a level of finish and ornament to match. Boutique luthiers such as Roger Borys and Bob Benedetto brought the aesthetics of the instrument to even greater heights, making them attractive to collectors, and also continuing to innovate in technical design. The Benedetto style of acoustic/electric archtop has itself been copied by luthiers such as Dale Unger and Dana Bourgeois. Most of the accessories (pickguard, bridge, tuner buttons, knobs, etc.) are made of wood (ebony or rosewood) instead of metal and have a clean acoustic look. It is estimated there are nearly 100 archtop guitar luthiers in North America alone.

Contrastingly, mass-market archtop guitars became more affordable in the late 20th century, due to a combination of low labor costs in Asian countries and computer numerically controlled manufacture. Most major guitar marques include at least a couple of archtops in their range, albeit not necessarily manufactured at their own facilities. Ibanez sells an extensive range of archtops under the Artcore marque. The Samick corporation sells archtops under its own name besides manufacturing for other companies. Gibson sells inexpensive Asian-made archtops under its Epiphone brand, such as the Epiphone Dot.

Renewed interest in acoustic music has also led to the revival of purely acoustic archtops, such as the Gibson L-7C, The Loar Lh-600, Godin 5th Avenue and the Epiphone Century Series.

Recent technical innovations include Ken Parker's use of carbon fibre in high-end acoustic archtops, and the Godin Montreal hybrid guitar.

== Construction ==
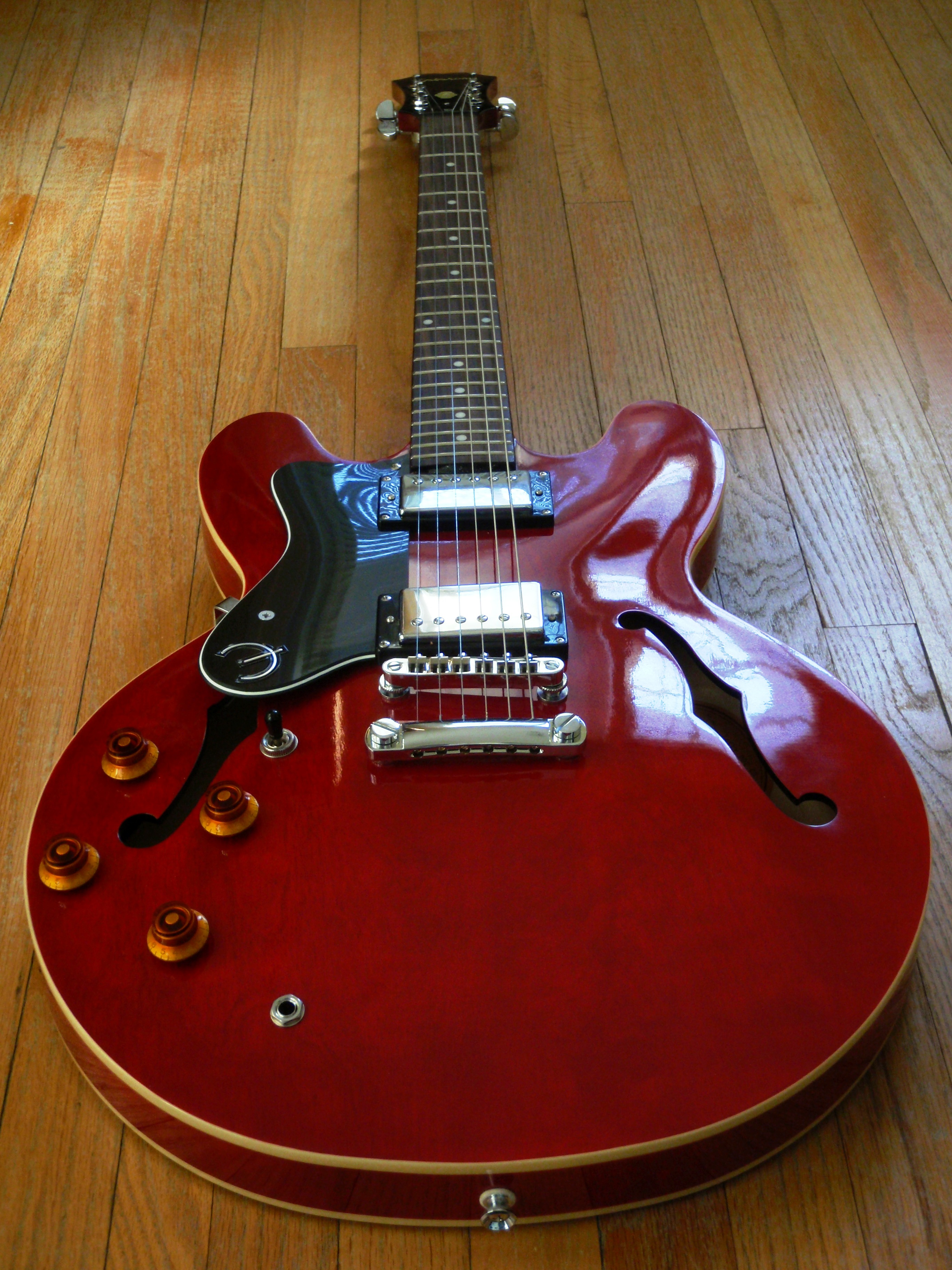
The Epiphone Dot, an inexpensive thinline archtop available since the 1990s

Archtops usually have three-a-side pegheads and necks similar in width to a steel-string acoustic rather than an electric. High-end models traditionally have "block" or "trapezoid" position markers.

The top or belly (and often the back) of the archtop guitar is either carved out of a block of solid wood or heat-pressed using either a solid top or laminations, the latter being a less expensive construction method. The belly normally has two f-holes, the lower of these partly covered by a scratch plate raised above the belly so as not to dampen its vibration. The arching of the top and the f-holes are similar to the violin family, on which they were originally based. The contours of the arching profile are usually derived in an ad hoc fashion. The tops of Gibson's archtops were parallel braced. X-braced designs were introduced later, giving a tone closer to that of a flat-top guitar. Sitka spruce, European spruce, and Engelmann spruce are most often used for the resonant tops of archtop guitars, although some guitar builders use Adirondack spruce (Red spruce), or Western red cedar. Archtop guitars often have Curly maple or Quilted maple backs. Full-sized archtops are among the largest guitars ever made, with the width of the lower bout in some cases approaching 19 inches (47 cm).

The original acoustic archtop guitars were designed to enhance volume, so they were constructed for use with relatively heavy strings. Even after electrification became the norm, jazz guitarists have continued to fit strings of 0.012" gauge or heavier for reasons of tone, and also prefer flatwound strings. Thinline archtops generally use standard electric guitar strings.

Many vibrato systems cannot be fitted to an archtop owing to the need to cut large holes in the belly to accommodate the mechanism, with the exception of the Bigsby vibrato tailpiece and the long tailpiece versions of the Gibson Vibrola. These vibrato systems mount on the surface of the guitar and need no body routing. Other systems have been used and trialed since this time.

== Various use of the term "archtop" ==
Although "archtop" normally refers to a hollow-bodied, arched top instrument, some makers of solid-bodied guitars with carved bellies also refer to these as archtop to distinguish these from flat top guitars. For example, Gibson refers to the standard Gibson Les Paul as an archtop to distinguish it from flat top models such as the Les Paul Special and Melody Maker.

A continuum exists from purely acoustic instruments similar to the original Orville Gibson design, to solid-body designs:

- Fully acoustic instruments with either a pressed laminate wood or hand carved top. One example in the latter category, almost cello-like in construction, is the Gibson L-5. The sound board is left to vibrate freely as no hardware other than the bridge posts come into contact with it. These instruments have a full-size body and a powerful acoustic tone suitable both for chords and for melody work. For amplified use, these guitars may be fitted with floating pickups in the neck position attached either to the base of the fingerboard or the edge of the pickguard. Modern "carved tops" may also incorporate piezo electric pickups to amplify the sound without changing the tone, as in other acoustic-electric guitars.
- Hollow-bodied semiacoustic guitars such as the Gibson ES-175, which have a sound box similar to fully acoustic guitars, but also have permanent pickups built into the sound board and are intended to be played through an amplifier. In some shallow-bodied models, such as the Epiphone Casino, the function of the sound box is purely to modify the sound transmitted to the pickups, as the un-amplified sound is weak and not normally considered musically useful.
- Semi-hollow guitars with a solid core but hollow bouts. In these, the bridge is fixed to a solid block of wood rather than to a sound board, and the belly vibration is minimized much as in a solid body instrument. While most such instruments feature F-holes, as seen on the Gibson ES-335, some semi-hollow bodies, such as the Gretsch Duo-Jet and Gibson Lucille, are made without sound holes to reduce the possibility of feedback.
- Solid body instruments, such as the Les Paul Standard, with a carved but non-sounding belly.

== Bass guitars ==
Archtop 4-string bass guitars have been manufactured since the use of electric pickups became popular. The most famous example is the Höfner violin bass used by Paul McCartney. Warwick makes a range of archtop 4-, 5-, and 6-string bass guitars. Framus also makes a range of archtop bass guitars.

== Other variations ==
4-string (tenor), 7-string, 9-string, and 12-string archtops have been manufactured.

A few luthiers offer archtopped Maccaferri guitars.

The Mohan veena is a cross between an archtop and an Indian veena.

Some electric archtops also have piezoelectric pickups, making them hybrid guitars.

A relatively small number of ukulele makers offer instruments with flat tops but arched backs, generally of heat-pressed laminate construction with high-quality veneer; that design concentrates the uke body's internal resonance upward toward the sound hole, "like a parabolic mirror," according to the German seller RISA, whose Koki'o brand line of ukuleles all feature arched backs.

== See also ==
- Archtop mandolins were developed at the same time for similar reasons.

== Bibliography ==
- Robert Benedetto: Making an Archtop Guitar
