= Silent guitar =

Guitar compatible with headphones

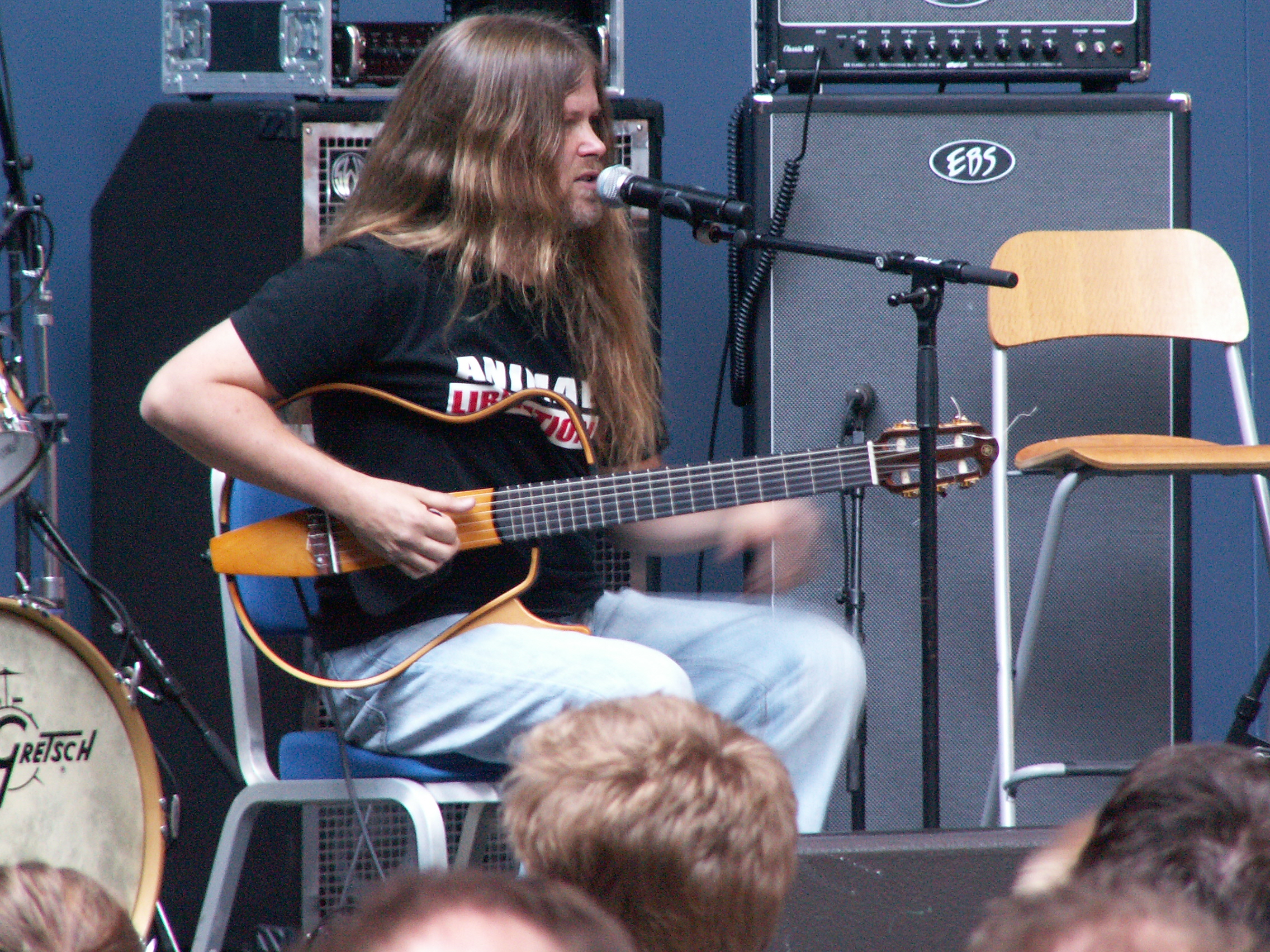
- Mattias Eklundh playing on a Yamaha Silent Guitar Clinic
- Manufacturer: Yamaha; Traveler Guitar; Warr Guitars; Koopal

Construction
- Body type: Hollow

A silent guitar is a type of guitar with a solid or chambered body that converts the vibration of the strings into electric current using a piezoelectric pickup. The body of the guitar does not amplify the vibration of the strings into audible sound. Thanks to this, musicians can practice with headphones without disturbing people around them, or obtain an acoustic tone under heavy amplification without feedback. Las Vegas Academy has used silent guitars in a classroom setting, with students wearing headphones to hear their instrument's sound.

== Types ==
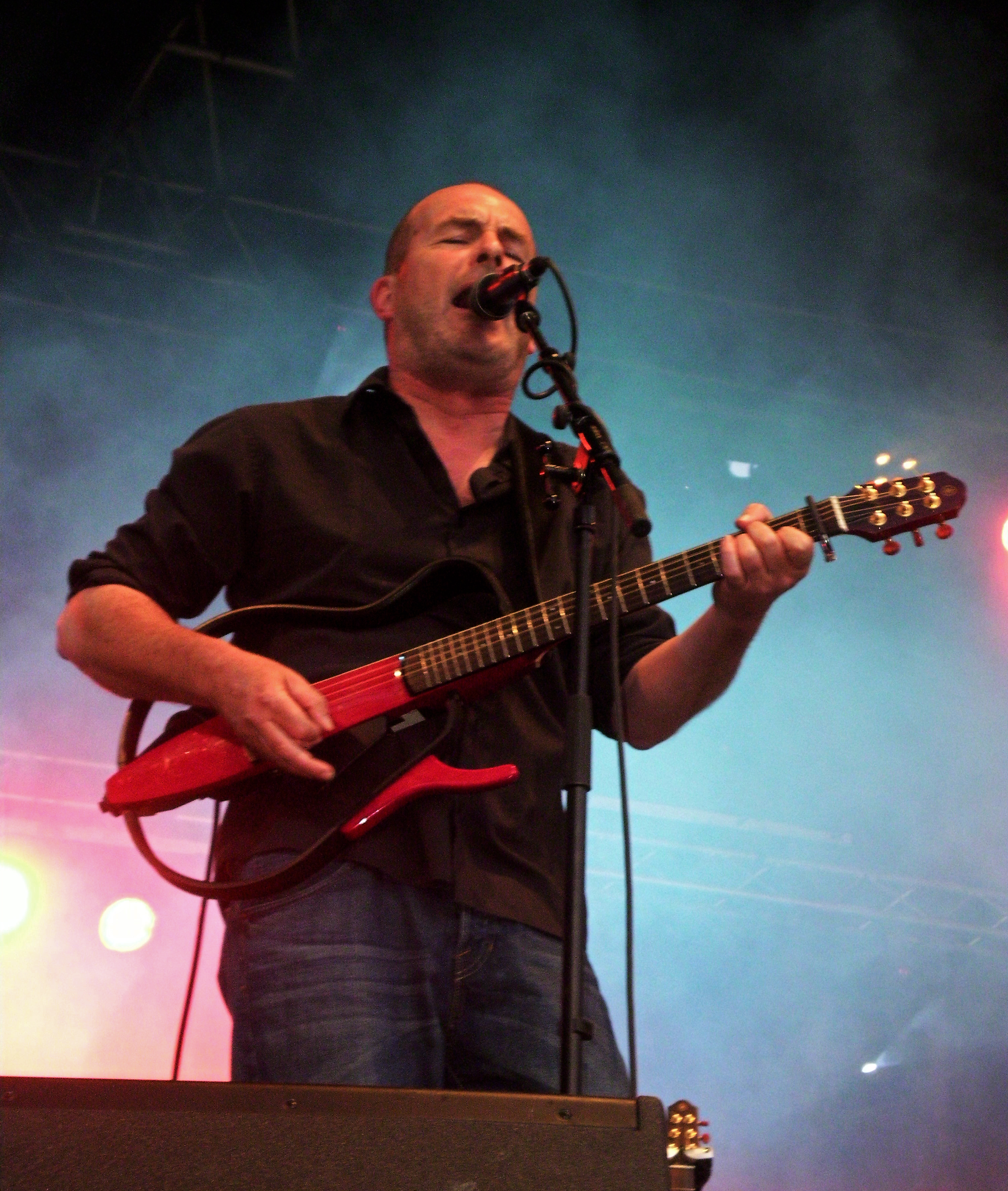
Jean-Pierre Riou, guitarist of Red Cardell, playing on Silent Guitar 10S

=== Full-size bodies ===
A successful early silent guitar with a full-sized body was the Gibson Chet Atkins SST. It appeared to have a soundhole, but it was in fact a dummy. It was employed by Mark Knopfler, among others.

=== Small bodies ===
Reducing the body size of a silent guitar has little effect on the sound. The portability of a small bodied guitar, as well as the ability to practice silently, is an advantage to travelers.

=== Skeleton guitars ===
Some silent guitars are small-bodied instruments with a knee-rest of outer frame in the dimensions of an acoustic guitar so that they can be played sitting. These can be detachable to allow conversion into a travel guitar. The most well known and popular model of this type is the Yamaha Silent Guitar series. The model in the photo above is the SLG130NW.

== Strings and tuning ==
Silent guitars are usually tuned in the same manner as traditional guitars, from low to high: E - A - D - G - B - E. Various models are available with seven, eight, and even 14-string configurations, although those are rare.

== Manufacturers ==
Several guitar manufacturers offer silent guitars, including Yamaha, Traveler Guitar and Warr Guitars.

== See also ==
- Acoustic-electric guitar
- Semi-acoustic guitar
- Hybrid guitar
