= Hybrid guitar =

Type of electric guitar

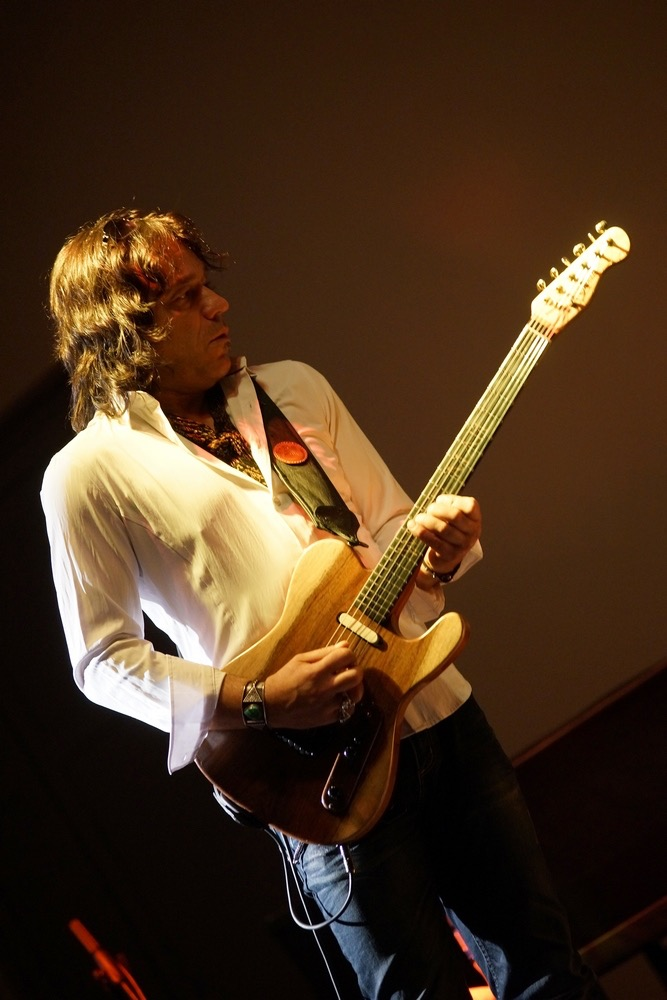
Wolf Mail playing a MG hybrid guitar in Germany

A hybrid guitar is an electric guitar with the ability to produce a signal with the tonal quality of an acoustic guitar in addition to a typical electric signal from a magnetic pickup, allowing a wide tonal pallette. The signal from the two-pickup systems can be blended on board, or (sometimes on the same instrument) fed separately to two different effect and amplification lines.

Hybrid guitars typically use a piezoelectric pickup to generate the acoustic-like signal, the same type of pickup used in most electro-acoustic guitars. Such pickups can produce a reasonable facsimile of acoustic tone even in solid bodied instruments. Aftermarket piezo pickups allow conventional electric guitars to be converted into hybrid guitars.

Examples of solid-body hybrid guitars include the Ovation VXT, Godin A6 Ultra, Peavey's Generation Custom EXP Quilt Top w/ Piezo Series and Tom Anderson Guitarworks Crowdster Plus One and Two. They are similar to silent guitars, except that the latter do not have magnetic pickups. Hollow-body hybrid guitars include the Hamer Duotone Custom, Michael Kelly hybrid, Taylor T5 and, Epiphone ULTRA-339, Ibanez Montage Crafter SA, PRS Hollowbody II Piezo. These resemble semi-acoustic guitars with additional piezo pickups. The Yamaha AEX1500 is a hybrid archtop guitar.

== See also ==
- Semi-acoustic guitar
- Acoustic-electric guitar
