= Gibson L-7C =

Acoustic archtop guitar by Gibson

The Gibson L-7C is an archtop acoustic guitar and one of the few archtop guitars still in production from major makers without an electric pickup.

Gibson first introduced the L-7C in the late 1940s.
