= Wilkanowski =

William Wilkanowski
- Born: Władysław Wilkanowski; November 15, 1886; Działyń, Poland
- Died: December 8, 1954 (aged 68); Long Island, United States
- Known for: Luthier, archtop guitars, 5000 violins
- Notable work: Airway W-4 guitar (1940)
- Spouse: M. Amelia G.

Władysław William "Willy" Wilkanowski (November 15, 1886, in Działyń, Poland – December 8, 1954, Long Island, US) was a Polish-American violin-maker, guitar-maker and violinist. He was a very productive luthier, known for making over 5000 violins and 100 violas with his staff at his workshop. He also created 30 unique, high-end archtop guitars, one of which, the Wilkanowski Airway W-4, was famously owned by Johnny Cash since the 1980s, when it also was featured as the centerfold in the Guitar World magazine.

Wilkanowski was also known to be a family man, doting on his wife Amelia (1886 – May 6, 1952), with whom he had raised 9 surviving children. When Amelia got sick, in 1950 he moved his workshop to their Long Island home to be close to her and look after her. After she died of the illness in 1952, he became very depressed and despondent without her. William stopped making instruments altogether and lost his source of income, which negatively affected his finances, adding to his depressive state. In early December 1954, he finally committed suicide and was laid to rest next to Amelia on December 13, 1954.

== Early life ==
Wilkanowski was born on November 15, 1886, as listed on his grave and on his draft card, and the year 1886 indicated as estimated in several census records of New York. His obituary states his age to be 69 in December 1954, which would then indicate the birth year as 1885. The draft card of 1942 reveals his birth place to be Działyń, but it is unclear, which of the 4 places of this name in Poland it could have been.

According to Fairfield's book, William built his first violin already at age 9 (in 1895), which would indicate that he came from a luthier or a musical family. In 1903, by the age of 17, he was a trained violin maker.

As many Poles of the time would leave the poverty and the Russian and German nationalist oppression of partitioned Poland, he joined his family in the United States. The year 1904, when he would be 17–18 years old, is listed as year of his immigration in the 1920 New York census, where his name is misspelled William Wikanoski and mistranscribed as Wikanski.
As countless Poles would do to assimilate in the United States, he changed his Polish first name Wladyslaw to the English name with the same initial, William, which would not be given as a child name in Poland, unless as the German form Wilhelm in the German speaking partitions of Poland. In the New York census records, there are several people listed with the last name Wilkanowski. At least one male relative of Wilkanowski already resided in New York – the father of his cousin Maximilian, born in New York. In 1905, William and his wife Amelia had their daughter Helen; several children followed, listed as 7 children, all born in New York and speaking Polish and English, as listed in the census of 1920.

Initially, William worked in the shop of Oliver Ditson of Boston. In the 1930s, he worked for Fred Gretsch (New York City), out of his own workshop and store in 58 Nassau Street, Brooklyn, New York. William was also a violinist himself and was a member of a polka band in the 1920s.

== Career in the United States ==
He was listed as a violin maker in Brooklyn by 1933, and at least one violin made in Brooklyn dates to 1924. From 1937 to 1941, he worked in both an era and a location renowned for the jazz guitar. Gretsch offered Wilkanowski's violins in a 1940 flyer with the text "his own personal work…no other hand touches them." His violins were offered from $50–150.

Wilkanowski is thought to have produced 5,000 violins and 100 violas by 1942. Some of the higher quality violins were marked with an inlayed logo of the stylized letter W; these instruments are thought to be entirely of his own making, while many of the others were made in the shops with assistants. The Gretsch Company released the Synchromatic line during the early '40s also, which were also archtop guitars, but shared no other similarities with Wilkanowski guitars. His role in the Synchromatic is not known.

Although known for his violins, Wilkanowski also produced a limited number of archtop guitars. The guitars were never catalogued. By 1942 he had sold 30 of these instruments, each unique in appointments and features, at $400 each, except for two deluxe Airway guitars, sold for $600. This price was in line with what was being charged for a D’Angelico New Yorker, or a Gibson Guitar Corporation Super 400. There is no evidence of guitars made by Wilkanowski after 1943, instead he continued making and successfully selling violins until 1952.

== Features of his guitars ==
Most of the Wilkanowski guitars would look not like regular jazz guitars, but very much like oversized and slightly squished violins or small cellos with an added guitar neck. Some of his guitars did not have the cello shape, but rather a more conventional archtop shape, without the cello-like points above the waist. The Wilkanowski headstock is thought to have been the main influence in the headstock for the current Ovation Guitar. Many of his guitars have the unique flattened oval Wilkanowski headstock, although some featured a violin like scroll of aluminium, and some of his headstocks would just be like conventional guitar headstock. The backs of most of his guitars were one piece of flamed maple, with no center joint. The wood William used would often be the Po Valley Poplar, a figured cello tonewood that can resemble maple. The finishing techniques included very light stain, or a violin color finish, and light sealer. The multiple layer binding was wooden, something fairly innovative at the time, and was raised above the level of the top and back plates. The f holes varied by instrument, standard shape, segmented, and later more modern cutouts appeared. Some of the Instruments displayed the name AIRWAY, some had a W on the headstock, and some remained unbranded. Some of the guitars carry serial numbers, a signature, or a label. Several of the guitars are labeled Wilkanowski and Son, although nothing is known of the son's responsibility. One of these guitars, the Airway W-4 model with abalone shell inlayed rim around the entire body front and abalone ornaments on the neck, was given as a gift to Johnny Cash by his wife June in the 1980s. Johnny kept this guitar until his death, and the instrument was subsequently sold at the Johnny Cash estate auction by Sotheby's in 2004, for 30,000 dollars, to appear again on auctions later.

== Personal life, family and death ==
Researching Wilkanowski's registered family data, nearly all records until his death in 1954 were filled in cursive handwriting with ink pens by English speaking clerks. These handwritten records are full of spelling mistakes and very vague age and event estimates. None of the census records, marriage certs etc. provide exact dates of birth for any of the family members, typically only registering a loose estimate of age at the time of the census and a variety of misspelled Polish names. This makes exact date estimation of many life events for Wilkanowski quite difficult.

William married a fellow Polish immigrant, Michalina Amelia, who came to New York in about 1901. Their wedding photo was provided by family to the biography article. Their marriage was registered twice in May and June of the year 1911, but according to later census records, the couple already had children from around the year 1904. This would mean that Wilkanowski and Amelia either had their first children out of wedlock, or got married any time around 1904, perhaps only registering in a church, as many Catholic Poles would view a church wedding as sufficient for their daily life. She would go by the name Amelia, also registered as Emily or as Emilia (1930 Census). Her maiden name was also listed and misspelled as Glowinska, Growdanska and Grobinska. in New York. Together they seem to have registered 11 children in total, 8 daughters and 3 sons. 9 of their children would survive them – the 7 daughters Helene, Genowefa/Genevieve, Carolyne, Florence, Irene, Viola and Natalie, and the 2 sons Henry and Theodore Joseph. In the 1940 New York census, Amelia is listed as Emily and 53 years old, 1 year older than William listed as "Wm", 52 years old. Five of their youngest children – the 3 girls and 2 sons – are listed living with the parents in the same 1940 census, which indicates their 5 oldest daughters already moved out and married. The name Joseph seems to have been significant to Wilkanowski, who would also label some of his violins with the name "Juzek", which is the slightly misspelled Polish diminutive of Joseph.

The Wilkanowski couple had a daughter, Isabella (1912–1945, married Reges), who worked as a waitress and unfortunately died by accident in Sept. 1945, aged 32. William provided herthe cause of death as carbon monoxide poisoning. In the 1920 census, a 15-year-old boy named Benjamin was listed as the oldest son of the family "Wilkanoski", with little Theodore being 8 months old. This Benjamin is missing from all later census records and documents.

In the 1940s, both of Wilkanowski's sons were drafted for the World War II, and William himself was also registered for draft. Henry was registered in 1942 and started service in 1943 with his infantry battalion. On his draft card, Henry listed his father William as his employer and Edward Wilkanowski as a relative to contact. Theodore was drafted in 1940 in the Young Man Draft and he listed his father as contact and his employer as Wilkanowski + Son (which was the label on the archtop guitars).

William's own registration card from April 1942 has a small but detailed description of him, providing the date and place of his birth, misspelled as the non-existing place "Dziatyn" (as the Polish small letter ł looks very much like the Latin t), his age as 56 which was then crossed over and corrected to the factual 55, as he had his birthday in November; his height as 5'4, his weight as 155 pounds, his eye color as brown, hair as gray and complexion as ruddy. In the occupation field, William did not disclose himself as a luthier, but as self employed.

The obituary in The Brooklyn Eagle of Saturday, December 11, 1954, describes in detail the death of William as suicide by hanging and that his body was found Wednesday December 8 in his home by Henry, who stopped by to pick his father up for a family dinner. William was interred on Monday December 13, 1954, in the Cemetery of the Holy Rood in Westbury, Nassau County NY, next to his wife.

After his death, a number of unfinished and dusty violins were found in his home. It seems as some of them were then finished by his coworkers or family members, as some Wilkanowski violins have labels dated later than 1952.

== Literature ==
- Bacon, Tony. (2005) The History of the American Guitar. ISBN 1-4027-3028-4
- Hunter, Dave. (2003) Acoustic Guitars: The Illustrated Encyclopedia. Thunder Bay Press. ISBN 1-59223-051-2
- Fairfield, John H. (1942) Known Violin Makers. Virtuoso Pubns Inc. ISBN 0-918624-00-2
