= Gibson ES-5 =

Hollow-body electric guitar

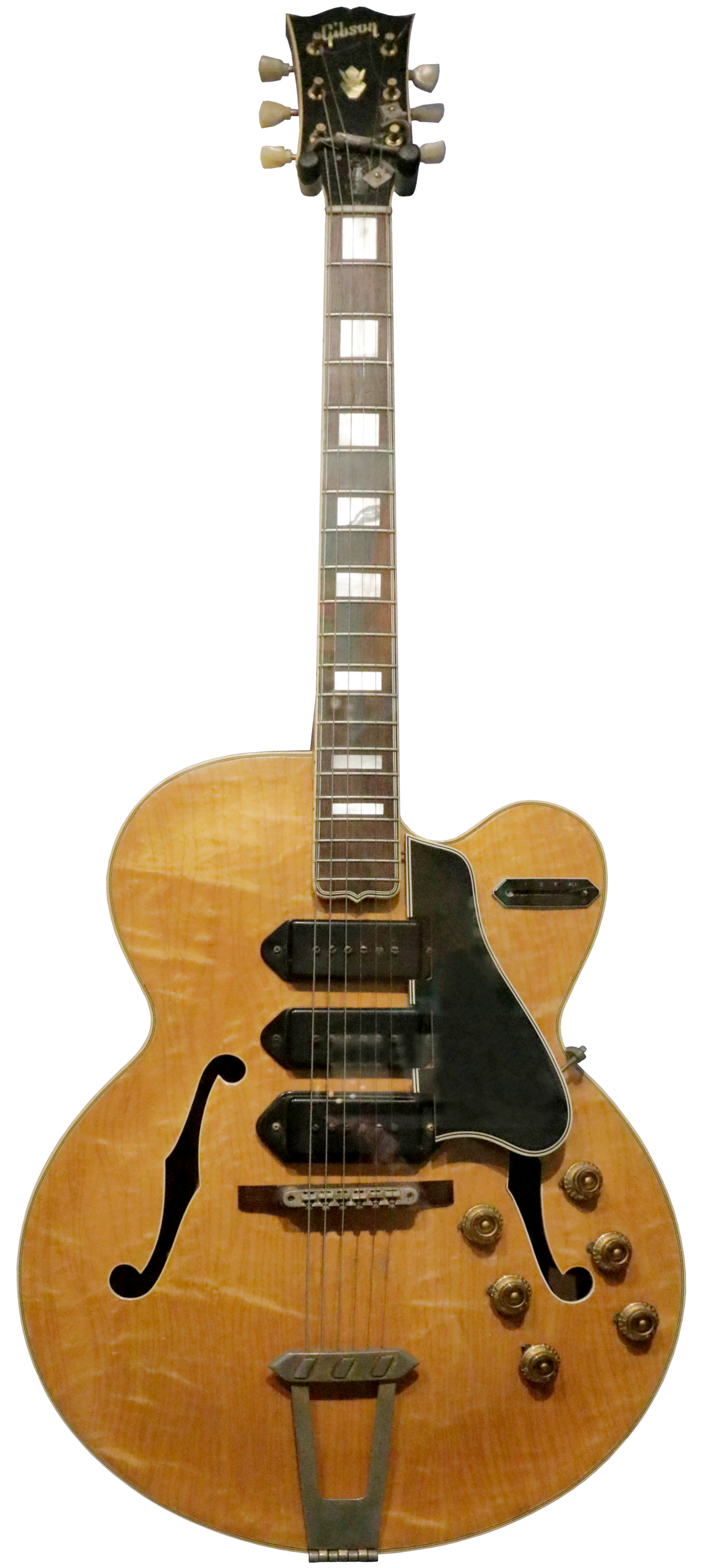
1956 Gibson ES-5 Switchmaster, played by Carl Perkins

The Gibson ES-5 is a hollow-body electric guitar produced by the Gibson Guitar Corporation as part of the ES, or "Electric Spanish", series of guitars.

== History ==
The ES-5 was intended to be an electric version of their popular Gibson L-5 acoustic jazz model. The ES-5 was introduced in 1949, and offered several innovative features which have become standard within the industry. The ES-5 was the first model of the ES-series to offer three pickups. Unlike other multiple-pickup models of its era, the ES-5 used three different volume knobs (one for each pickup and one master tone) rather than a selector switch, to offer players improved control over their tone. The model was not as popular as other models of the ES-series, nor as popular as similar models by other manufacturers, such as the Epiphone Zephyr Emperor. In 1955 the model became the ES-5 Switchmaster, which incorporated a four-position selector switch, along with a new six-knob configuration, incorporating a volume and a tone knob for each pickup. The ES-5 Switchmaster was produced until 1962. It remained out of production until a 1995 reissue from the Gibson Custom division. New models of the reissue are still available today. The original models used P-90 single coil pickups, but after 1957 the guitar used PAF humbucker pickups.

== Notable users ==
- T-Bone Walker
- Lowell Fulson
- Roy Gaines
- J. Geils
- Wes Montgomery
- Carl Perkins
- B.B. King
- Eddie Taylor
- Frank Zappa
- Steve Howe (main guitar on Fragile)
- Kid Ramos
- Junior Watson
- Dave Edmunds
- Mark Knopfler
- Jimmy Page
- Howard Gordon, guitarist of The Chuck Wagon Gang during the 1950s and 60s
- Jimmy Nolen
- Jimmy Pruett, country musician who played guitar and piano and was blind
- Gary Moore (most notably, it can be seen on the cover of the 1987 album Wild Frontier)
