= Solid body =

String instrument whose body is not hollow

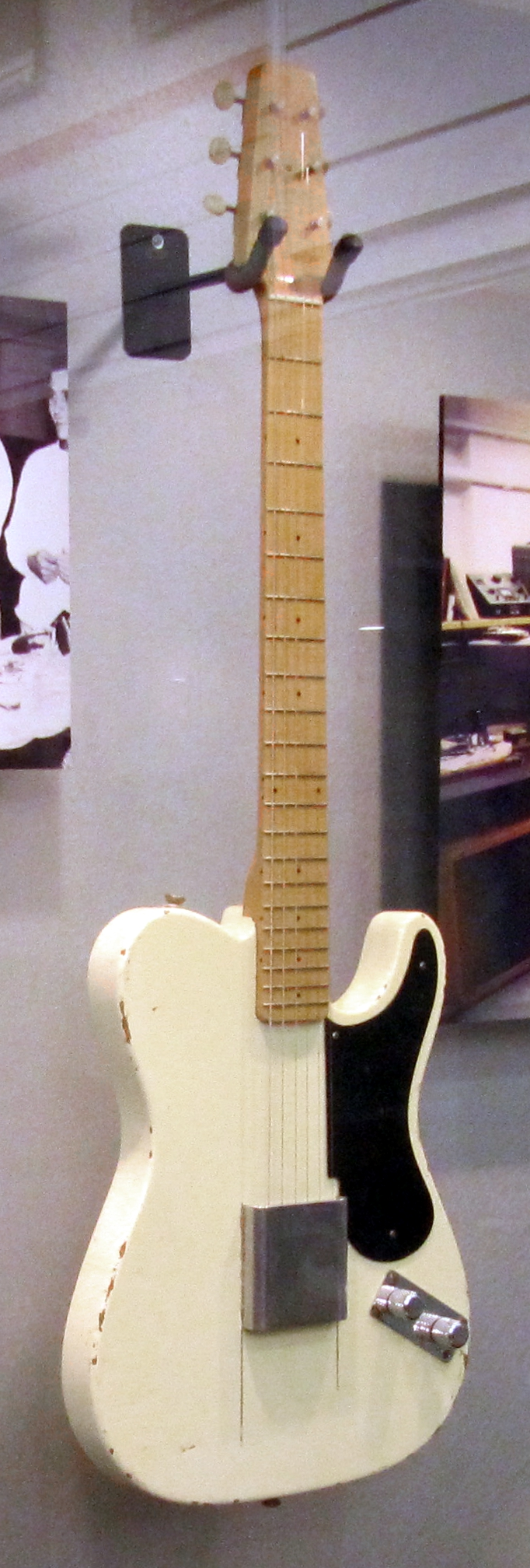
Fender Esquire 1st prototype in 1949 at Fender Guitar Factory museum

A solid-body musical instrument is a string instrument such as a guitar, bass or violin built without its normal sound box and relying on an electromagnetic pickup system to directly detect the vibrations of the strings; these instruments are usually plugged into an instrument amplifier and loudspeaker to be heard. Solid-body instruments are preferred in situations where acoustic feedback may otherwise be a problem and are inherently both less expensive to build and more rugged than acoustic electric instruments.

Recognisable solid body instruments are the electric guitar and electric bass, developed in the 1930s. Common woods used in the construction of solid body instruments are ash, alder, maple, mahogany, korina, spruce, rosewood, and ebony. The first two make up the majority of solid body electric guitars.

Solid body instruments have some of the same features as acoustic string instruments. Like a typical string instrument, they have a neck with tuners for the strings, a bridge and a fingerboard (or fretboard). The fretboard is a piece of wood placed on the top surface of the neck, extending from the head to the body. The strings run above the fingerboard. Some fingerboards have frets or bars which the strings are pressed against. This allows musicians to stop the string in the same place. Ebony, rosewood and maple are commonly used to make the fingerboard.

Some electric guitar necks do not have a separate piece of wood for the fingerboard surface. All the solid bodies have variations in scale length or, the length of the strings from the nut to the bridge. The action, or the height of the strings from the fingerboard, is adjustable on solid body instruments. Most solid bodies have controls for volume and tone. Some have an electronic preamplifier with equalization for low, middle, and high frequencies. These are used to shape the sound along with the aid of the main instrument amplifier. Amplifiers allow solid body instruments to be heard at high volumes when desired.

== Instruments ==
Solid-body instruments :

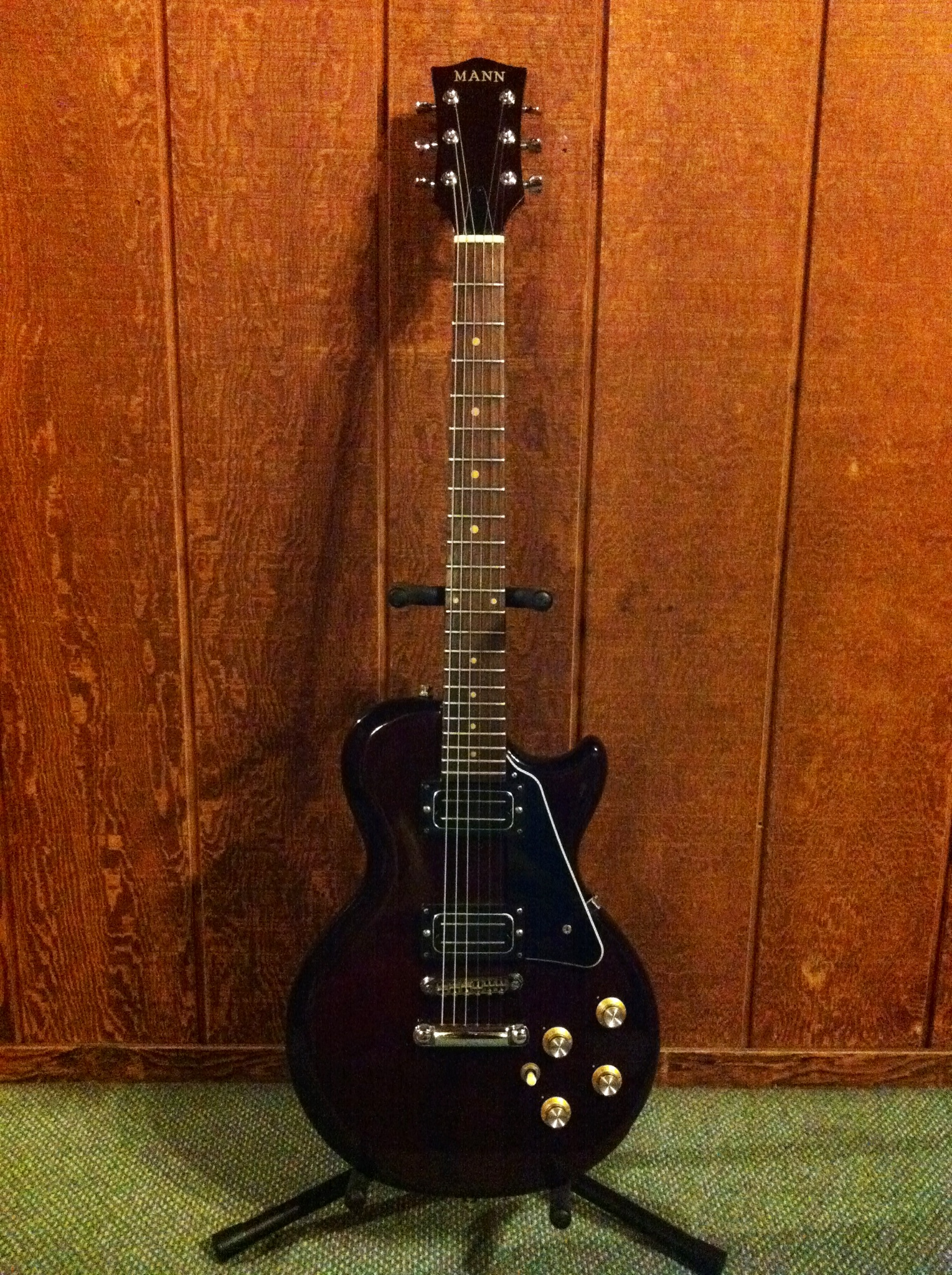
Example : Mid-1970s "Lawsuit Era", solid-body, set neck, Mann/Ibanez electric guitar

- Some electric guitars
- Most bass guitars
- Electric upright bass
- Some Electric ukuleles
- Few electric mandolins
- Most electric violins
- Most electric sitars
- Most electric violas
- Electric cello

Solid-body instruments do not include :

- Semi-acoustic instruments
- Electric pianos, even those with strings such as the electric grand piano
- Pedal steel guitar

Electric lap steel guitars without sounding boards are considered to be solid-body instruments by some authorities, and not by others. This has a major effect on some claims of historical priority, as they predate the first models of solid-body electric guitar, which may otherwise be claimed to be the first commercially successful solid-body instruments. While noting this, it will be assumed that electric lap steels without sounding boards are solid-body instruments for the purposes of this article.

== History ==
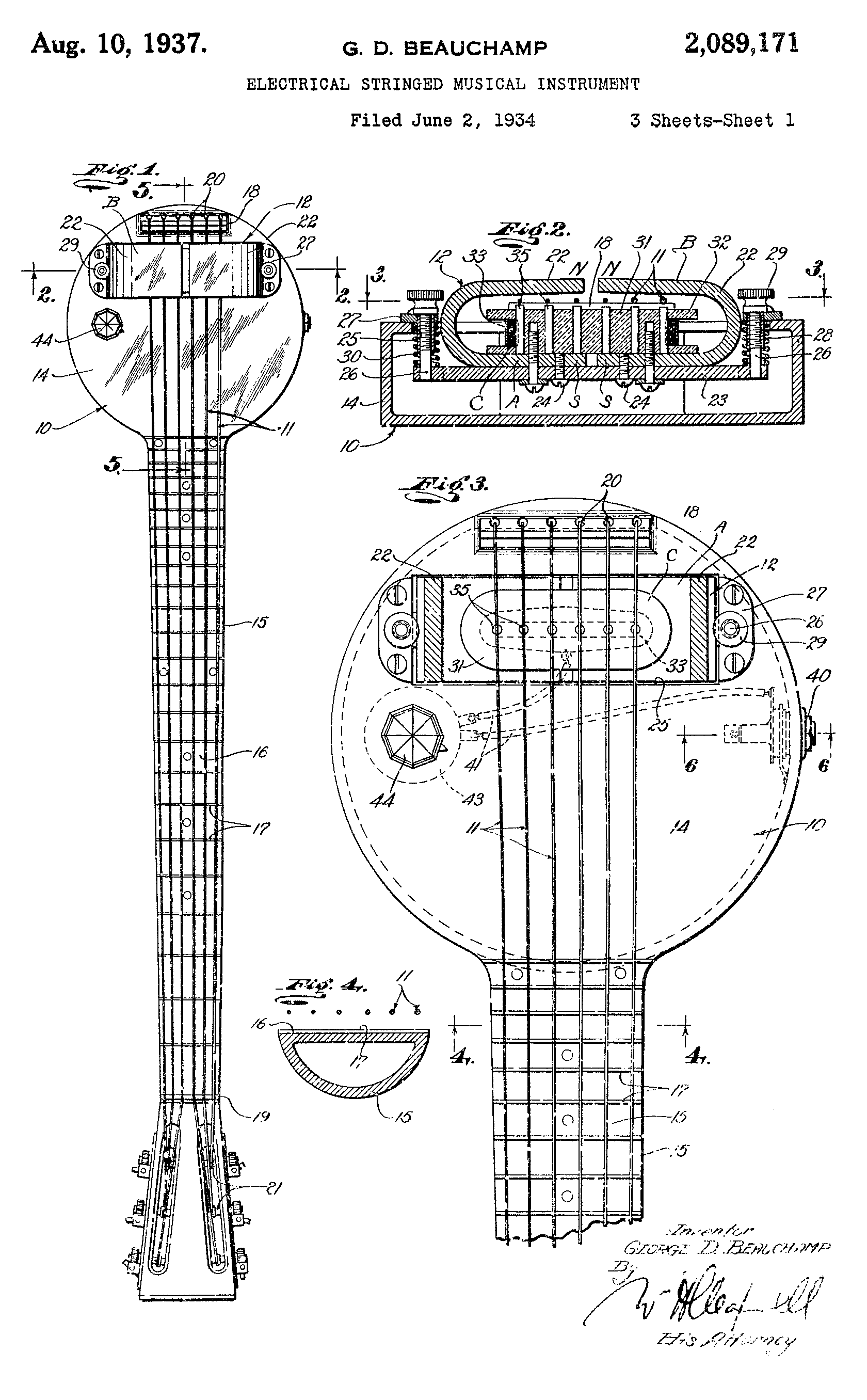
Sketch of Rickenbacker "frying pan" lap steel guitar from 1934 patent application

=== Commercial models ===
The first commercially successful solid-body instrument was the Rickenbacker frying pan lap steel guitar, produced from 1931 to 1939. The first commercially available non lap steel electric guitar was also produced by the Rickenbacker/Electro company, starting in 1931 The model was referred to as the "electric Spanish Guitar" to distinguish it from the "Hawaiian" lap steel.

The first commercially successful solid-body electric guitar was the Fender Broadcaster in 1950. A trademark dispute with the Gretsch Corporation who marketed a line of Broadcaster drums led to a name change to the current designation, Fender Telecaster in 1951 (Transition instruments produced between the two model names had no model name on the head stock and are now referred to as 'No Casters"). Fender also produced a one pickup version called the Fender Esquire starting in 1950, which actually preceded the Broadcaster on the market by two months. These were followed by the Gibson Les Paul in 1952.

=== Additional history ===
==== Electric guitar ====
The solid-body electric guitar is recognisable and features in rock, metal, blues, and country music.

The first commercially available solid-body electric Spanish guitar was produced by the Rickenbacker company in 1931.

The Songster electric guitar was made between 1936 and 1939 by the Slingerland Musical Instrument Manufacturing Company in Chicago, Illinois.

Also it is reported that around the same time (1940) a solid body was created by Jamaican musician and inventor Hedley Jones.

Les Paul, a guitarist, is often credited with inventing the first solid body, but Fender is often credited as the first to commercially market a solid-body electric guitar, which itself was based on a design by Merle Travis.

In the 1940s, Les Paul created a guitar he called the "Log," which came "from the 4" by 4" solid block of pine which the guitarist had inserted between the sawed halves of the body that he'd just dismembered. He then re-joined the neck to the pine log, using some metal brackets." He then put some pickups that he designed on it. He soon went to companies asking if they would buy his guitar. They turned him down. However, after the Fender Telecaster electric guitar became popular, the Gibson company contacted him and had him endorse a model named after him, the "Les Paul" model. It came out in 1952.

While Les Paul was looking for a manufacturer for his log, Leo Fender was working on the Fender Telecaster. It was released in 1950. The Telecaster had a "basic, single-cutaway solid slab of ash for a body and separate screwed-on maple neck was geared to mass production. It had a slanted pickup mounted into a steel bridge-plate carrying three adjustable bridge-saddles." Its color was blond. It is considered "the world's first commercially marketed solid body electric guitar." . The Telecaster continues to be manufactured today.

The follow-up to the Telecaster, the Stratocaster, appeared in 1954. It had three pickups instead of two. It had a vibrato bar on the bridge. This allowed players to bend notes. "The contoured body with its beveled corners reduced the chafing on the player's body." It also had cutaway above and below the fretboard to allow players easy access to the top frets.

In 1958, Gibson introduced the Explorer and the Flying V. Only about 100 Explorers were produced, and very few of the Flying V. Both were discontinued shortly after. The Flying V did manage to find a few followers and Gibson reintroduced the guitar in 1967. The Explorer was also reintroduced, in the mid-1970s. Both guitars are still in production today.

In 1961, Gibson discontinued the Les Paul model and replaced it with a new design. The result was the Solid Guitar (SG). It weighed less and was less dense than the Les Paul. It had double cutaways to allow easier access to the top frets. Eventually the Les Paul was put back into production in 1968 because Blues and Hard Rock guitarists liked the sound of the Les Pauls. The SG and the Les Paul are still in production today.

Fender and Gibson went on to make other well-known models. Gibson made the Melody Maker and the Firebird. Fender later created the Jazzmaster, and Jaguar.

Some of the designs that Gibson and Fender created provide the basis for many guitars made by various manufacturers today.

==== Electric bass ====
Woods typically used to make the body of the bass are alder, maple, or mahogany.

The double bass was seen as very bulky and not as easy to carry as other string instruments. Paul Tutmarc built an electronic bass that was played the same way as a guitar. This bass was called the Audiovox Model 736 Electronic Bass. "About 100 Audiovox 736 basses were made, and their distribution was apparently limited to the Seattle area." The idea did not catch on and the company folded.

In the late 1940s when dance bands downsized, guitar players who lost their positions playing guitar were told they could play double bass. However, "they did not want to take the time to learn upright technique. They needed a bass they could play like a guitar-a fretted bass." Leo Fender heard these criticisms and took his Telecaster model and adopted it to a bass guitar. The result was the Fender Precision Bass. It consisted of an ash bolt-on maple neck. The scale for the bass was 34." "It also had "cutaways for better balance." Now guitarists could double on bass, and the bass player of the band would not have to carry around a huge upright bass. It entered the market in 1951.

Fender's second bass model, the Jazz Bass, was introduced in 1959. It had a slimmer neck at the nut, a different two pickup combination, and an offset body shape. While it did not become extremely popular among jazz players, it was well received in rock music.

Many companies today produced models based on the body shapes first started by Fender.

Gibson created the Gibson Electric Bass to be introduced in the 1953. The scale, 30 ½" was shorter than the Fender basses. Its body was designed to look like a violin. It had a single pickup. It also had an endpin which allowed the bass player to play it vertically. In 1959 Gibson created the EB-0 which was designed to complement the Les Paul Junior. In 1961 it was redesigned to match the SG guitar and the EB-) designation was retained. A two pickup version was later introduced called the EB-3 and a long scale variant was made called the EB-3L.

Gibson also created the Thunderbird in 1963, which complemented the Firebird. It had the 34" scale for the neck. This was the same scale as the Fender basses.

Other companies have created designs that are different from the Fender and Gibson models.

==== Electric mandolin ====
Electric mandolins are similar to electric violins because they traditionally have one pickup.

Epiphone marketed an electric mandolin called the Mandobird IV and VIII, IV and VIII standing for four and eight strings respectively.

They usually have a bolt on neck and a rosewood inlay.

==== Electric violin ====
The solid body electric violin is different from the traditional violin because it does not have a hollow body and has a "Piezo Pickup with Passive Volume and Tone Controls." These features allow it to be amplified. The body is made of wood, usually maple. The top of the violin might be made out of flame maple or solid spruce. The body of the electric violin compared to an acoustic violin has cutaways that allow for weight reduction and a lighter body.

==== Electric sitar ====
While a regular sitar has 21, 22, or 23 strings an electric sitar is designed similar to a guitar. It first appeared in 1967 when "Vinnie Bell invented the Coral electric sitar, a small six-string guitar-like instrument producing a twangy sound that reminded people of its Indian namesake." It is played like a regular guitar. An electric sitar's electronics consist of "Three pickups with individual volume and tone controls are standard, including one pickup over the sympathetic strings." The bridge of the electric sitar is creates the sound of a sitar. Like electric guitars, made by Fender especially, the neck of a sitar is usually "made of bolt-on, hard maple wood with an optional mini-harp." The sitar also has 13 drone strings located above the six strings that reach from the fretboard to the bridge.

==== Electric viola ====
Electric violas are designed similar to electric violins. They usually have the same features.

==== Electric cello ====
Electric cellos are similar to regular cellos, but they have a smaller body. Some electric cellos have no body branching out from the middle where the strings are. Some electric cellos have the out line of the traditional body around the middle, creating the feel of a traditional cello. It is played like a traditional cello. The body can be made out of alder.

== See also ==
- Semi-acoustic guitar
- 3rd bridge guitar
