= Sound box =

Open chamber in the body of a musical instrument

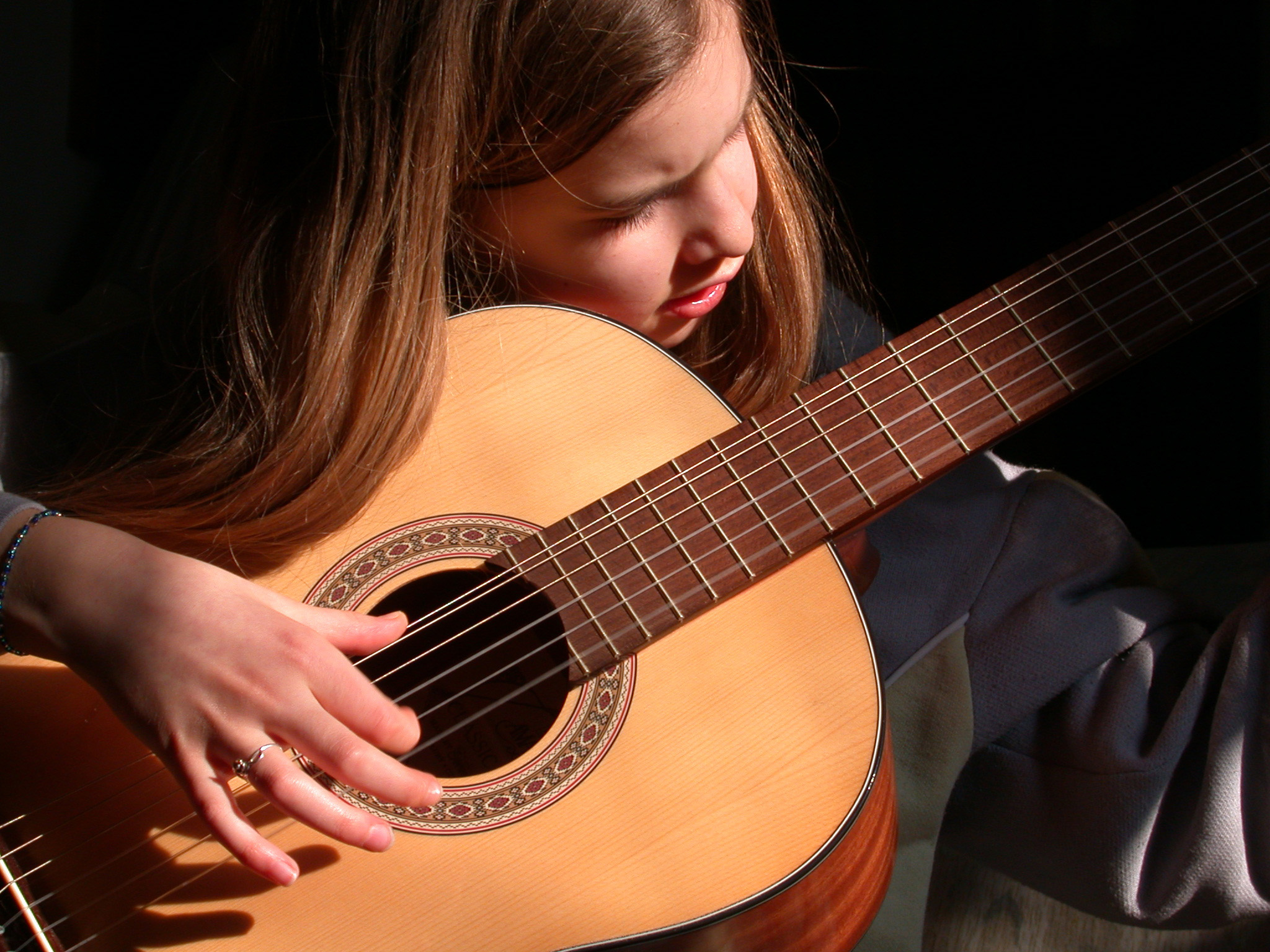
Soundbox of a classical guitar

A sound box or sounding box (sometimes written soundbox) is an open chamber in the body of a musical instrument which modifies the sound of the instrument and helps transfer that sound to the surrounding air. Objects respond more strongly to vibrations at certain frequencies, known as resonances. The frequency and strength of the resonances of the body of a musical instrument have a significant impact on the tone quality it produces. The air inside the chamber has its own resonances, and these interact with the resonances of the body, altering the resonances of the instrument as a whole. The sound box typically adds resonances at lower frequencies, enhancing the lower-frequency response of the instrument.

The distinctive sound of an instrument with a sound box owes a lot to the alteration made to the tone. A sound box is found in most string instruments. The most notable exceptions are some electrically amplified instruments like the solid body electric guitar or the electric violin, and the piano, which uses only a sound board instead. Drumhead lutes such as the banjo or erhu have at least one open end of the sound box covered with animal skin (or a skin-like acrylic material). Open back banjos are normally used for clawhammer and frailing, while those used for bluegrass have the back covered with a resonator.

In some arrangements, loudspeakers are also mounted on a sound box to enhance their output, particularly bass speakers. One notable example of this arrangement is called the bass reflex enclosure. However, in these cases, the box resonance is carefully tuned to make the sound more equal across frequencies, rather than to impart a particular character to the reinforced sound.
