= Acoustic-electric guitar =

String instrument

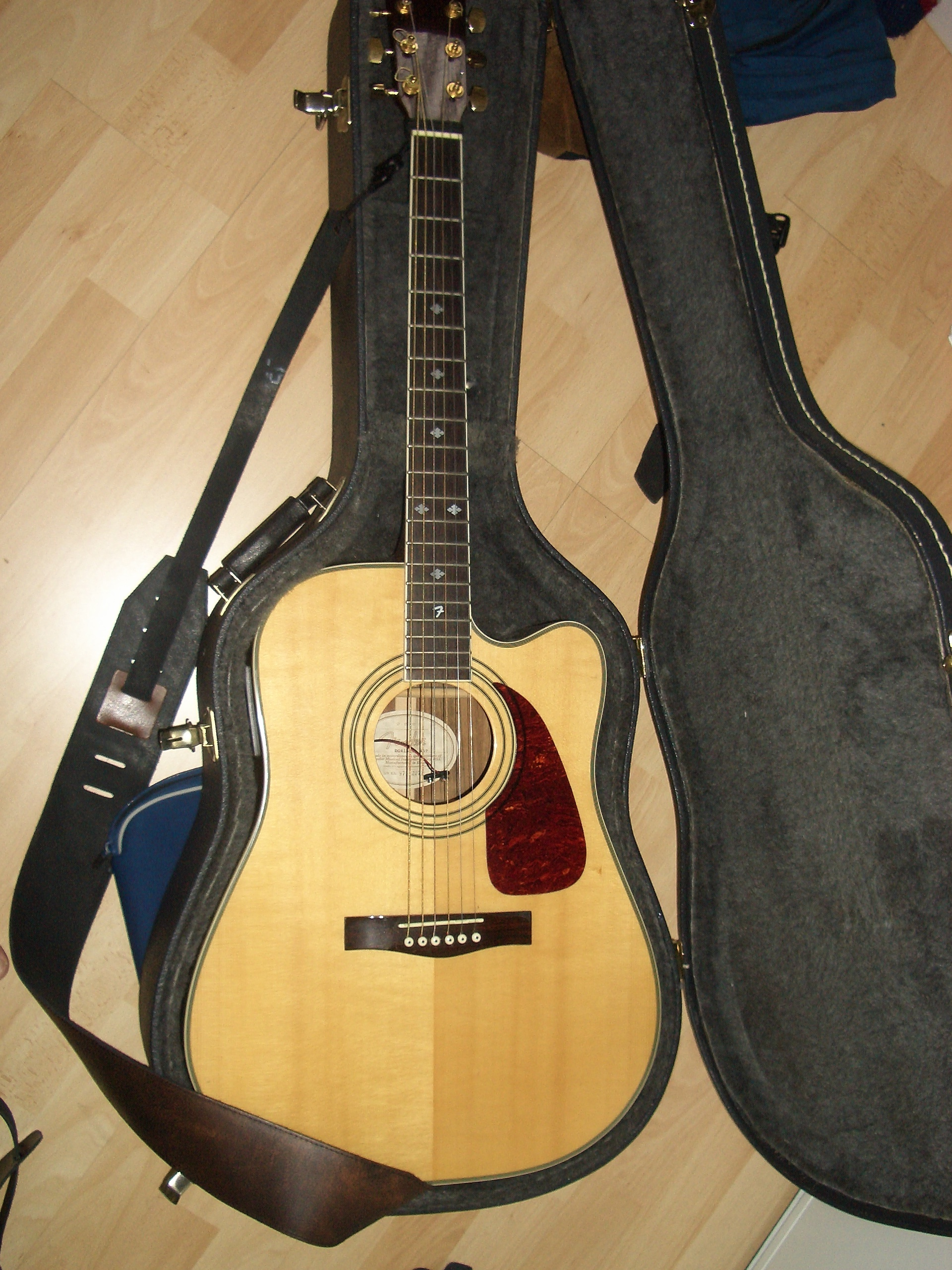
Fender DG-41SCE guitar.

An acoustic-electric guitar, also called an electro-acoustic guitar, is an acoustic guitar fitted with a microphone, or a magnetic or piezoelectric pickup. They are used in a variety of music genres where the sound of an acoustic guitar is desired but more volume is required, especially during live performances. The design is distinct from a semi-acoustic guitar, which is an electric guitar with the addition of sound chambers within the guitar body.

Usually, acoustic-electric guitars are fitted with piezoelectric pickups, requiring a preamplifier incorporated into the guitar body to amplify the signal before it travels to the main guitar amplifier. These preamps may also come with an integrated tuner and tone controls of varying types; equalizers with up to six frequency bands may be used.

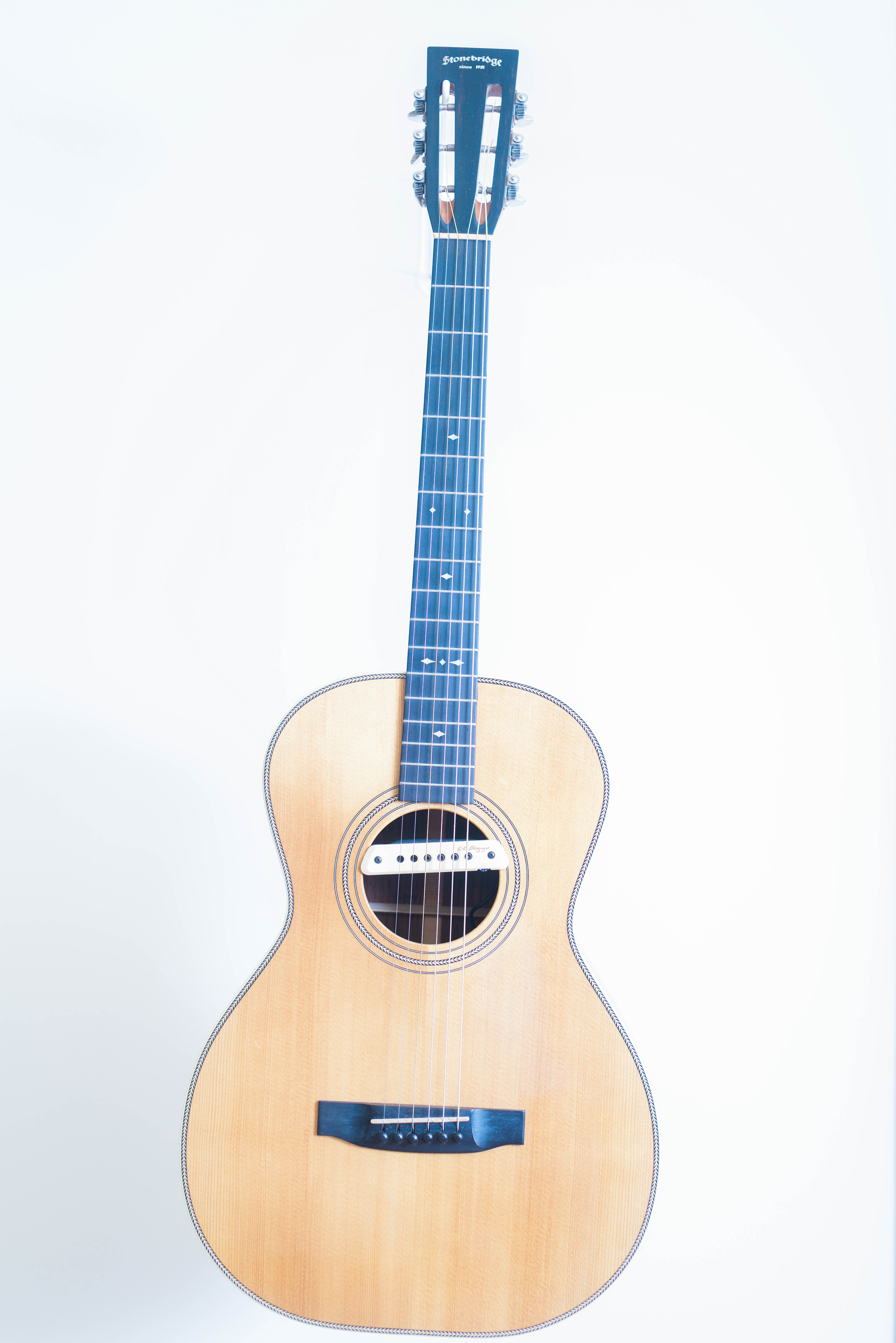
Acoustic-electric guitar with slotted headstock and an electric sound hole pickup.

== History ==
In the 1920s, guitarists like Eddie Lang transitioned the acoustic guitar from a primarily solo instrument to use in big bands. However, in a big band, the guitar was outplayed by the horn section and drums, and the need for amplification became apparent quickly. Various experiments at electrically amplifying the vibrations of a string instrument date back to the early part of the twentieth century; patents from the 1910s show telephone transmitters adapted and placed inside violins and banjos to amplify the sound. Hobbyists in the 1920s used carbon button microphones attached to the bridge, but these detected vibrations from the bridge on top of the instrument, so the resulting signal was weak.

The first person to create the modern electric pickup for the acoustic guitar was Lloyd Loar, who in the 1930s left Gibson and founded his own company, Vivi-Tone. Electronics were mounted in a removable drawer that slid out of the bass rim of the guitar. The signal was then transferred from a wooden bridge to a metal plate which allowed for an electric output and thus amplification. The first commercially available electric pickup however were Harry DeArmond's FHC pickups, released in the 1930s. They were widely adopted because they did not require any modification of the guitar.

In 1954, Gibson released the first commercially successful flattop acoustic-electric guitars, the J–160E and CF-100E. Notable 1970s companies include Ovation and Takamine.

During their MTV Unplugged performance, Nirvana frontman Kurt Cobain notably used an acoustic-electric guitar in order to calm his nerves on being on a show known for its use of acoustic instruments, allowing for him to run his guitar through his pedal board and amp for a more familiar sound.

== See also ==
- Electric guitar
- Semi-acoustic guitar
- Hybrid guitar
- String instrument
