= Pickup (music technology) =

Captures vibrations produced by musical instruments

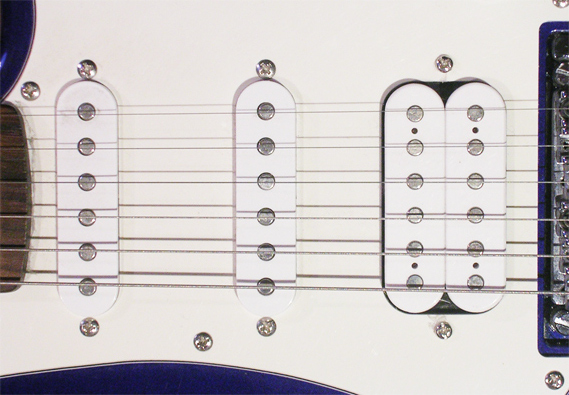
Three magnetic pickups on a Peavey Raptor with the pickup configuration of a fat-strat (H-S-S). The bridge (right) pickup is a humbucker and the neck (left) and middle pickups are single-coils.

A pickup is an electromagnetic transducer that converts energy from one form to another which senses mechanical vibrations produced by musical instruments, particularly string instruments such as electric guitars, and converts these to an electrical signal that is amplified using an instrument amplifier to produce musical sounds through a loudspeaker in a speaker enclosure. The signal from a pickup can also be recorded directly.

The first electrical string instrument with pickups, the "Frying Pan" slide guitar, was created by George Beauchamp and Adolph Rickenbacker around 1931.

Most electric guitars and electric basses use magnetic pickups. Acoustic guitars, upright basses, and fiddles often use piezoelectric pickups.

== Magnetic pickups ==
A typical magnetic pickup is a transducer (specifically a variable reluctance sensor) that consists of one or more permanent magnets (usually alnico or ferrite) wrapped with a coil of several thousand turns of fine enameled copper wire. The magnet creates a magnetic field which is focused by the pickup's pole piece or pieces. The permanent magnet in the pickup magnetizes the guitar string above it. This causes the string to generate a magnetic field which is in alignment with that of the permanent magnet. When the string is plucked, the magnetic field around it moves up and down with the string. This moving magnetic field induces a voltage in the coil of the pickup as described by Faraday's law of induction. Output voltage depends on the instrument and playing style and which string(s) are played and where on the string, but for example, a Samick TV Twenty guitar played on the bridge measured 16 mV RMS (200 mV peak) for one string and 128 mV RMS (850 mV peak) for a chord.

The pickup is connected with a 6.35 mm audio jack (instrument cable) to an amplifier, which amplifies the signal to a sufficient magnitude of power to drive a loudspeaker (most amplifiers are above 10 watts). A pickup can also be connected to recording equipment via a patch cable.

A pickup is a part of an electric guitar or bass that "hears" the strings and turns their vibrations into an electrical signal. It’s usually attached to the guitar's body, but sometimes it’s placed on other parts like the bridge (where the strings rest) or the neck.

Pickups come in several types:

- Single-coil pickups: One coil "listens" to all the strings.
- Humbuckers: Two coils work together to reduce noise and give a thicker sound.
- Split-coil pickups: Found on certain bass guitars, these have two separate coils, each "listening" to different strings. For example, on a bass with four strings, one coil handles the lower two strings, and the other handles the higher two.

The pickup plays a big role in how the guitar sounds, and different guitars often use unique pickups to create their own signature tone. Guitar companies use this as a key feature to attract buyers.

=== Construction ===
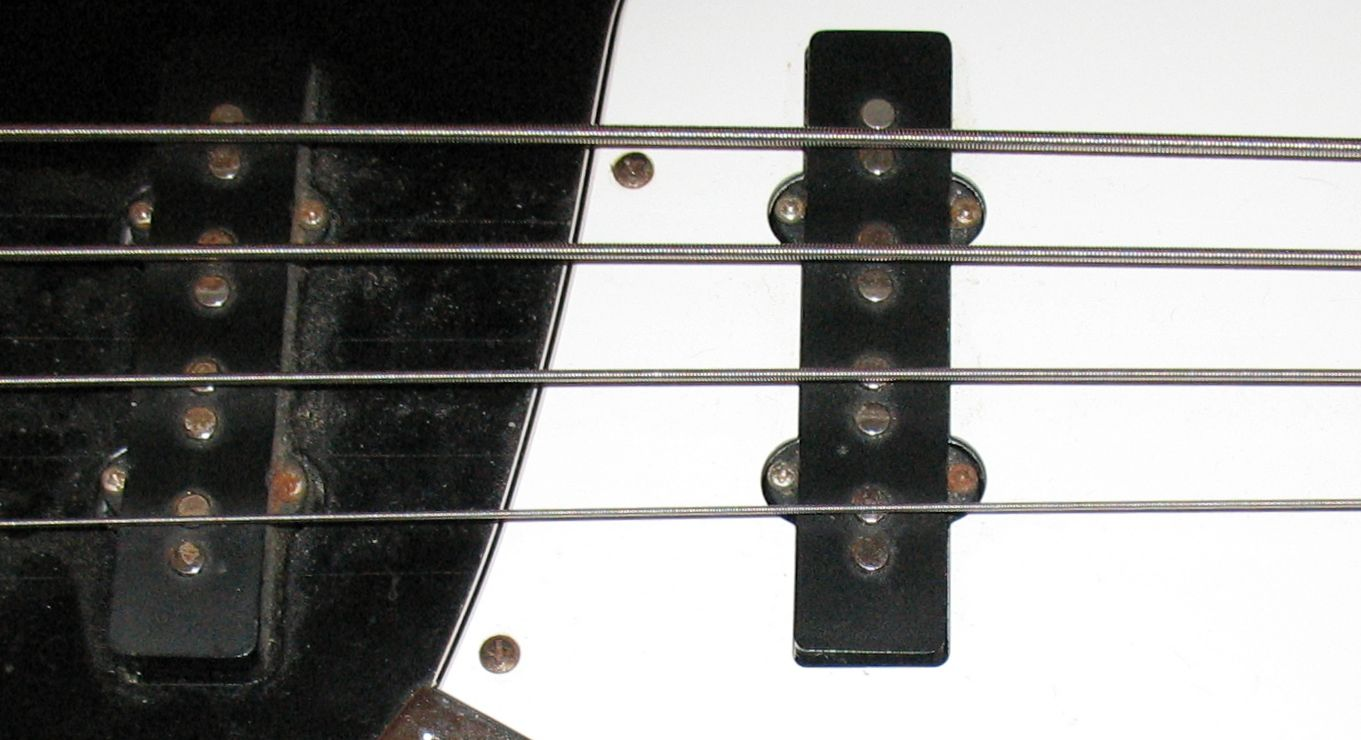
Split pole pickups, Fender Jazz Bass

Pickups have magnetic polepieces, typically one or two for each string, with the notable exceptions of rail and lipstick tube pickups. Single polepieces are approximately centered on each string whereas dual polepieces such as the standard pickups on the Fender Jazz Bass and Precision Bass sit either side of each string.

On most guitars, the strings are not fully parallel: they converge at the nut and diverge at the bridge. Thus, bridge, neck, and middle pickups usually have different polepiece spacings on the same guitar.

There are several standards on pickup sizes and string spacing between the poles. Spacing is measured either as a distance between 1st to 6th polepieces' centers (this is also called "E-to-E" spacing), or as a distance between adjacent polepieces' centers.

	1st-to-6th	Adjacent
Standard spacing (Vintage Gibson guitars)	1.90"; 48 mm	0.380"; 9.6 mm
F-spacing (Most Fender guitars, modern Gibson, Floyd Rose bridges)	2.01"; 51 mm	0.402"; 10.2 mm
Very close to bridge, extra pickup (Roland GK series hexaphonic)	2.060"; 52.3 mm	0.412"; 10.5 mm
Telecaster spacing (Fender Telecaster guitars)	2.165"; 55 mm	0.433"; 11 mm
Steinberger Spirit GT-Pro spacing (may be typical for other Steinberger guitars)	2.362"; 60 mm	0.3937"; 10 mm

=== Output ===
Some high-output pickups employ very strong magnets, thus creating more flux and thereby more output. This can be detrimental to the final sound because the magnet's pull on the strings (called string capture) can cause problems with intonation as well as damp the strings and reduce sustain.

Other high-output pickups have more turns of wire to increase the voltage generated by the string's movement. However, this also increases the pickup's output resistance and impedance, which can affect high frequencies if the pickup is not isolated by a buffer amplifier or a DI unit.

=== Pickup sound ===
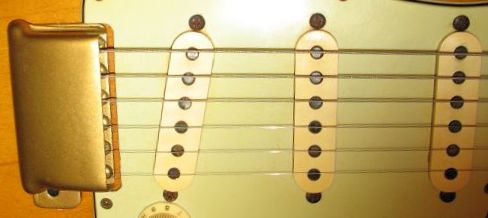
Single-coil pickups, Fender Stratocaster (1963)

The turns of wire in proximity to each other have an equivalent self-capacitance that, when added to any cable capacitance present, resonates with the inductance of the winding. This resonance can accentuate certain frequencies, giving the pickup a characteristic tonal quality. The more turns of wire in the winding, the higher the output voltage but the lower this resonance frequency.

The arrangement of parasitic resistances and capacitances in the guitar, cable, and amplifier input, combined with the inductive source impedance inherent in this type of transducer forms a resistively-damped second-order low-pass filter, producing a non-linearity effect not found in piezoelectric or optical transducers. Pickups are usually designed to feed a high input impedance, typically a megohm or more, and a low-impedance load increases attenuation of higher frequencies. Typical maximum frequency of a single-coil pickup is around 5 kHz, with the highest note on a typical guitar fretboard having a fundamental frequency of 1.17 kHz.

=== Humbuckers ===
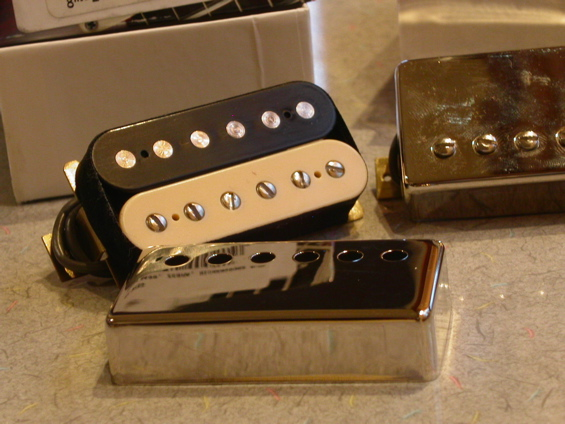
PRS's Dragon humbucker

Single-coil pickups act like a directional antenna and are prone to pick up mains hum—nuisance alternating current electromagnetic interference from electrical power cables, power transformers, fluorescent light ballasts, video monitors, or televisions—along with the musical signal. Mains hum consists of a fundamental signal at a nominal 50 or 60 Hz, depending on local current frequency, and usually some harmonic content.

To overcome this, the humbucking pickup was invented by Joseph Raymond "Ray" Butts (for Gretsch), while Seth Lover also worked on one for Gibson. Who developed it first is a matter of some debate, but Butts was awarded the first patent (U.S. patent 2,892,371) and Lover came next (U.S. patent 2,896,491).

A humbucking pickup is composed of two coils, with each coil wound reverse to the other. Each set of six magnetic poles is also opposite in polarity. Since ambient hum from electrical devices reaches the coils as common-mode noise, it induces an equal voltage in each coil, but 180 degrees out of phase between the two voltages. These effectively cancel each other, while the signal from the guitar string is doubled.

When wired in series, as is most common, the overall inductance of the pickup is increased, which lowers its resonance frequency and attenuates the higher frequencies, giving a less trebly tone (i.e., "fatter") than either of the two component single-coil pickups would give alone.

An alternative wiring places the coils in buck parallel, which has a more neutral effect on resonant frequency. This pickup wiring is rare, as guitarists have come to expect that humbucking pickups 'have a sound', and are not so neutral. On fine jazz guitars, the parallel wiring produces significantly cleaner sound, as the lowered source impedance drives capacitive cable with lower high frequency attenuation. It is not uncommon for instruments aimed at rock players to have series/parallel switching between the two configurations.

A side-by-side humbucking pickup senses a wider section of each string than a single-coil pickup. By picking up a larger portion of the vibrating string, more lower harmonics are present in the signal produced by the pickup in relation to high harmonics, resulting in a "fatter" tone. Humbucking pickups in the narrow form factor of a single-coil, designed to replace single-coil pickups, have the narrower aperture resembling that of a single-coil pickup. Some models of these single-coil-replacement humbuckers produce more authentic resemblances to classic single-coil tones than full-size humbucking pickups of a similar inductance.

=== Notation ===
Most electric guitars have two or three magnetic pickups. A combination of pickups is called a pickup configuration, usually notated by writing out the pickup types in order from bridge pickup through mid pickup(s) to neck pickup, using "S" for single-coil and "H" for humbucker. Typically the bridge pickup is known as the lead pickup, and the neck pickup is known as the rhythm pickup.

Common pickup configurations include:

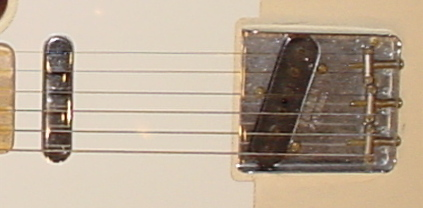
S-S (Fender Telecaster, Jazzmaster, and Jaguar, Peavey Reactor, and some Rickenbacker and Gibson guitars)

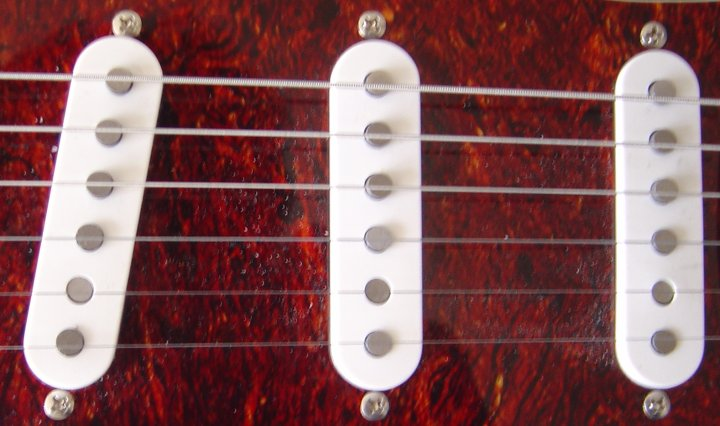
S-S-S (Fender Stratocaster)

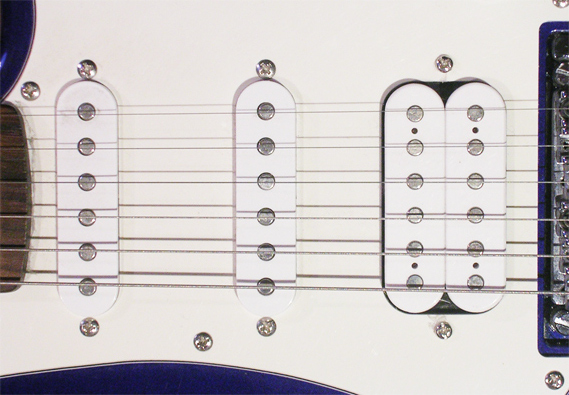
H-S-S (superstrats like Fender HM Strat, Peavey Raptor EXP, Peavey Destiny)

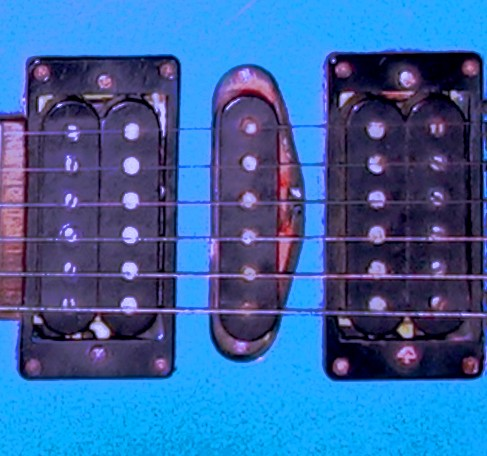
H-S-H (Ibanez RG, Ibanez S, other superstrats)
- H-H (Gibson Les Paul, many others including superstrats)

Less frequently found configurations are:

- S (Fender Esquire, early Gibson Les Paul Juniors, Gibson Melody Maker, Danelectro U1, some Telecasters)
- H (Gibson ES-165 Herb Ellis, Kramer Baretta, later Les Paul Juniors)
- H-S (Hamer Californian Deluxe, Les Paul BFG, Squier '51)
- H-H-H (some Gibson Les Paul Goldtop and Custom models, Gibson SG-3, Gibson ES-5 Switchmaster (after 1957), Kramer Jersey Star, Ibanez Destroyer, Ibanez PGM200)

Examples of rare configurations that only a few particular models use include:

- H-S, but with single-coil in the middle (one model of Fender Jazzmaster, Ibanez RG2011SC, Fender Player Jaguar)
- H-S-S, but with no space between the middle single-coil and the bridge humbucker (Hamer Phantom with angled neck pickup)
- H-H-S (Mayones Legend “22” Anders Nyström signature, some ESP Stephen Carpenter Models, and Alembic Jerry Garcia Models)
- H-S-S-H (Music Man Steve Morse Signature)
- S-H (some Telecasters, Music Man "Valentine" James Valentine signature)
- S-H-H (some early seven-string ESP Horizons)
- S-H-S (Fender Wayne Kramer Signature)

== Piezoelectric pickups ==
=== Sensors ===
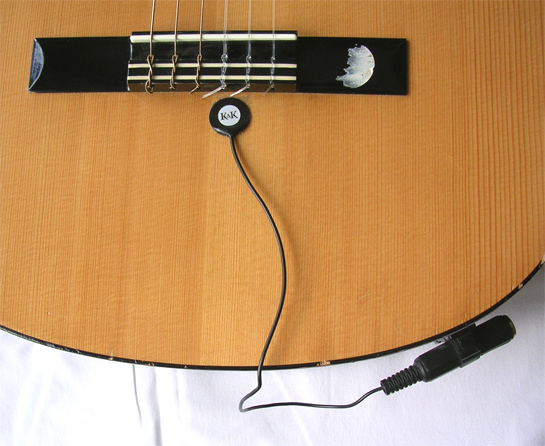
Piezoelectric pickup on a classical acoustic guitar

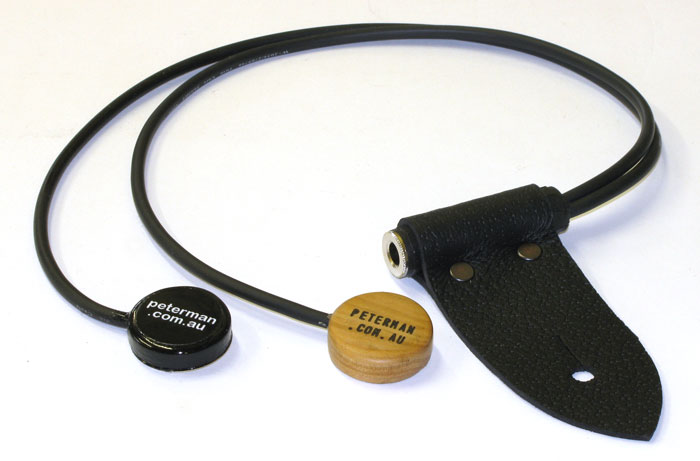
Dual pickup by Peterman in Australia

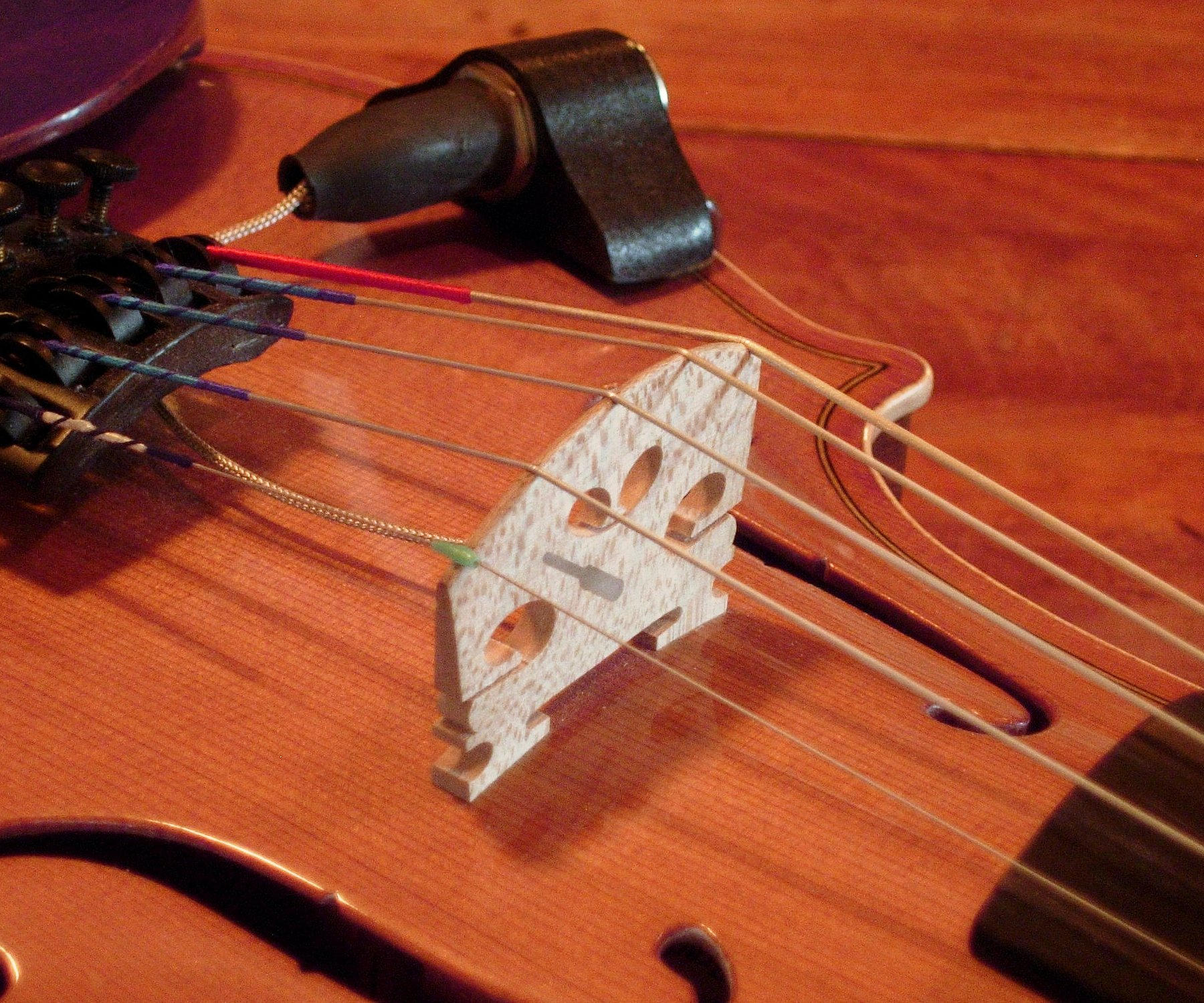
Piezoelectric violin bridge pickup

The piezoelectric pickup contains a piezo crystal, which converts the vibrations directly to a changing voltage.

Many semi-acoustic and acoustic guitars, and some electric guitars and basses, have been fitted with piezoelectric pickups instead of, or in addition to, magnetic pickups. These have a very different sound, and also have the advantage of not picking up any other magnetic fields, such as mains hum and feedback from monitoring loops. In hybrid guitars, this system allows switching between magnetic pickup and piezo sounds, or simultaneously blending the output. Solid bodied guitars with only a piezo pickup are known as silent guitars, which are usually used for practicing by acoustic guitarists. Piezo pickups can also be built into electric guitar bridges for conversion of existing instruments.

Most pickups for bowed string instruments, such as cello, violin, and double bass, are piezoelectric. These may be inlaid into the bridge, laid between the bridge feet and the top of the instrument, or, less frequently, wedged under a wing of the bridge. Some pickups are fastened to the top of the instrument with removable putty.

=== Preamps ===
Piezoelectric pickups have a very high output impedance and appear as a capacitance in series with a voltage source. They therefore often have an instrument-mounted buffer amplifier fitted to maximize frequency response.

The piezo pickup gives a very wide frequency range output compared to the magnetic types and can give large amplitude signals from the strings. For this reason, the buffer amplifier is often powered from relatively high voltage rails (about ±9 V) to avoid distortion due to clipping. A less linear preamp (like a single-FET amplifier) might be preferable due to softer clipping characteristics. Such an amplifier starts to distort sooner, which makes the distortion less "buzzy" and less audible than a more linear, but less forgiving op-amp. However, at least one study indicates that most people cannot tell the difference between FET and op-amp circuits in blind listening comparisons of electric instrument preamps, which correlates with results of formal studies of other types of audio devices. Sometimes, piezoelectric pickups are used in conjunction with magnetic types to give a wider range of available sounds.

For early pickup devices using the piezoelectric effect, see Phonograph.

== Other transducers ==
Some pickup products are installed and used similarly to piezoelectric pickups, but use different underlying technology, for instance electret or condenser microphone technology.

== Double systems pickups ==
There are basically four principles used to convert sound into an alternating current, each with their pros and cons:

1. A microphone registers the vibrations of the air caused by the instrument. In general this technique guarantees a good sound quality, but with two limitations: feedback and crosstalk.
2. Contact pickups register the vibrations of the instrument itself. They have the advantage of producing little feedback and no crosstalk at all. In spite of their lesser sound quality and thanks to their low price, contact pickups (and especially the piezoelectric pickup) have become the most popular transducer.
3. Magnetic pickups. Magnetic pickups, as applied in electric guitars, register the vibrations of nickel or steel strings in a magnetic field. They have the advantage that they can be connected directly to an (electric guitar) amplifier, but in combination with a steel-string acoustic guitar the sound tends to be electric. This is why acoustic guitarists typically choose a piezoelectric pickup, built in microphone, or both.
4. Electrostatic pickups. Another way is to use the changing capacitance between the string and a pickup plate. These electronic pickups produce much higher dynamics than conventional pickups, so the difference between a soft and a loud pick strike is more pronounced than with other types of pickups.

An amplification system with two transducers combines the qualities of both. A combination of a microphone and a piezoelectric pickup typically produces better sound quality and less sensitivity to feedback, as compared to single transducers. However, this is not always the case. A less frequently used combination is a piezoelectric and a magnetic pickup. This combination can work well for a solid sound with dynamics and expression. Examples of a double system amplifier are the Highlander iP-2, the Verweij VAMP, or the LR Baggs dual source and the D-TAR Multisource.

== Optical ==
Optical pickups are a fairly recent development that work by sensing the interruption of a light beam by a vibrating string. The light source is usually an LED, and the detector is a photodiode or phototransistor. These pickups are completely resistant to magnetic or electric interference and also have a very broad and flat frequency response, unlike magnetic pickups.

Optical pickup guitars were first shown at the 1969 NAMM Convention in Chicago, by Ron Hoag.

In 2000, Christopher Willcox, founder of LightWave Systems, unveiled a new beta technology for an optical pickup system using infrared light. In May 2001, LightWave Systems released their second generation pickup, dubbed the "S2."

== Active and passive pickups ==
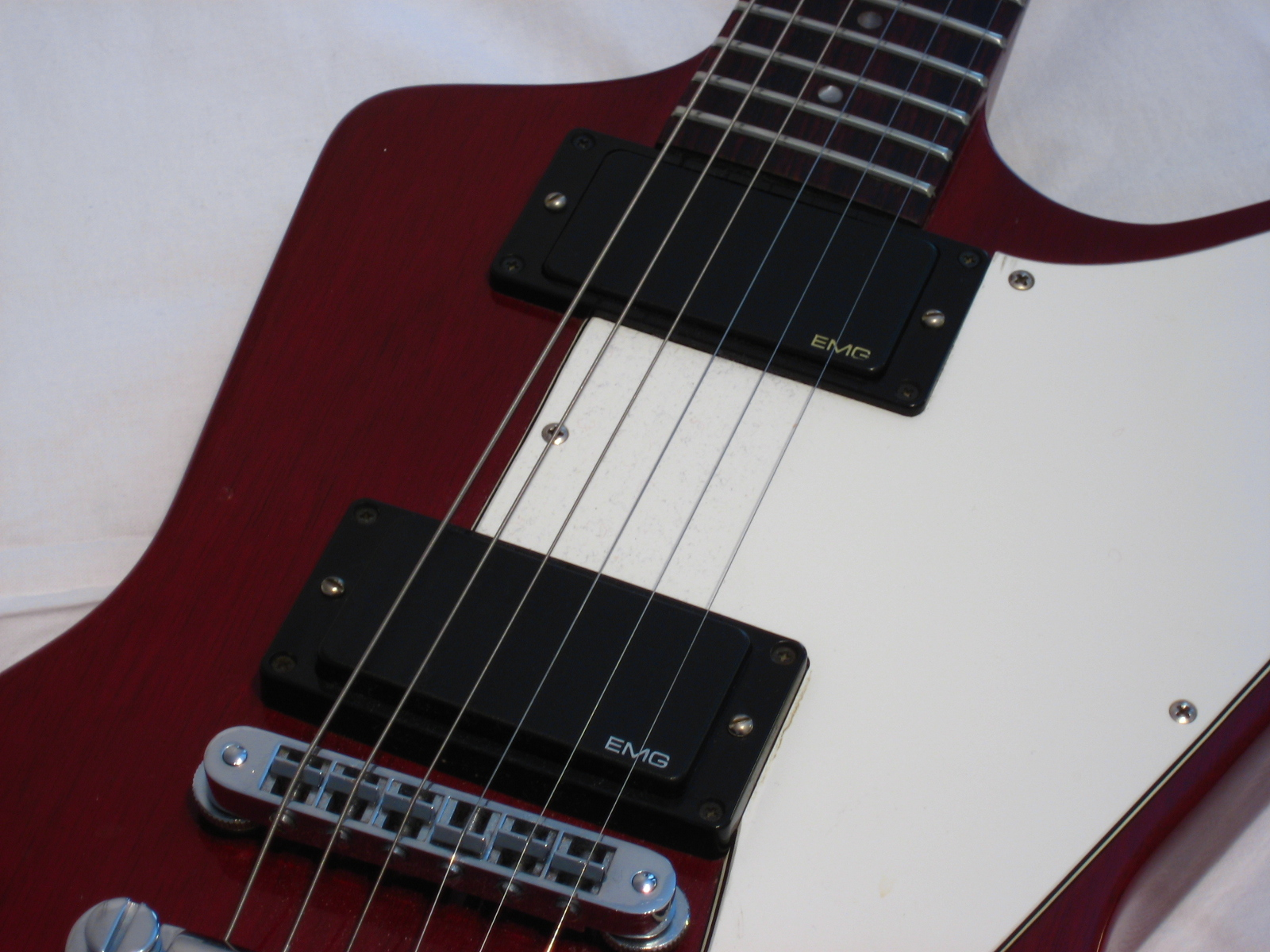
EMG 81 and EMG 85: a pair of popular active pickups

Pickups can be either active or passive. Pickups, apart from optical types, are inherently passive transducers. "Passive" pickups are usually wire-wound around a magnet, and are the most common type used. They can generate electric potential without need for external power, though their output is relatively low, and the harmonic content of output depends greatly on the winding.

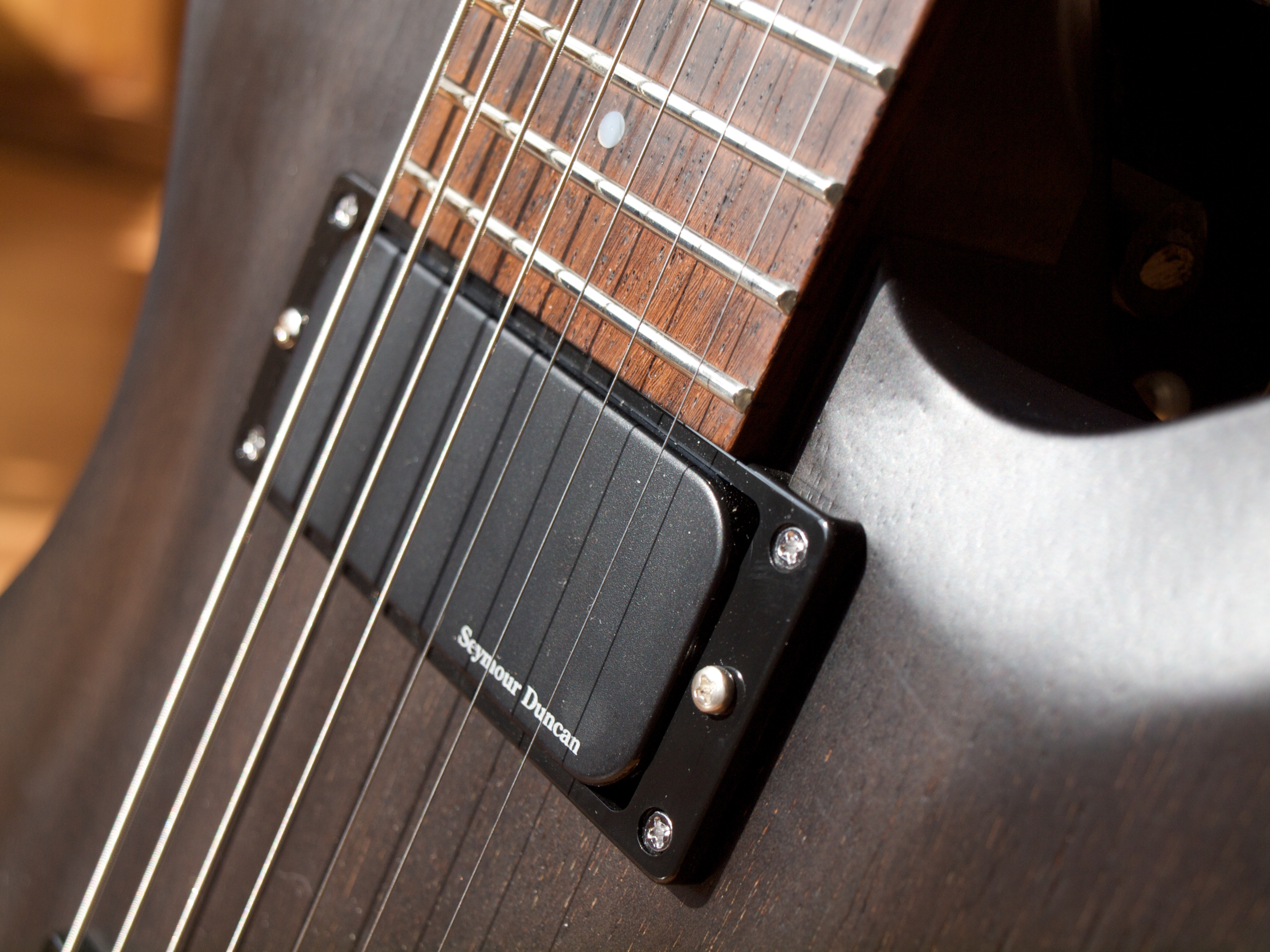
Seymour Duncan AHB-1 Blackouts

"Active" pickups incorporate electronic circuitry to modify the signal. Active circuits can filter, attenuate, or boost the signal from the pickup. The main disadvantage of an active system is requirement of a battery power source to operate the preamp circuitry. Batteries limit circuit design and functionality, in addition to being inconvenient to the musician. The circuitry may be as simple as a single transistor, or up to several operational amplifiers configured as active filters, active EQ, and other sound-shaping features. The op amps used must be of a low-power design to optimize battery life, a design restriction that limits the dynamic range of the circuit. The active circuitry may contain audio filters, which reduce the dynamic range and mildly distort certain ranges. High-output active pickup systems also have an effect on an amplifier's input circuit.

== Stereo and multiple pickups with individual outputs ==
Rickenbacker was the first manufacturer to market stereo instruments (guitars and basses). Their proprietary "Ric-O-Sound" circuitry has two separate output jacks, allowing the musician to send each pickup to its own audio chain (effects device, amplifier, mixing console input).

Teisco produced a guitar with a stereo option. Teisco divided the two sections in the upper three strings and the lower three strings for each individual output.

The Gittler guitar was a limited production guitar with six pickups, one for each string.

Gibson created the HD.6X Pro guitar that captures a separate signal for each individual string and sends them to an onboard analog/digital converter, then out of the guitar via Ethernet cable.

== Multi-transducer pickups ==
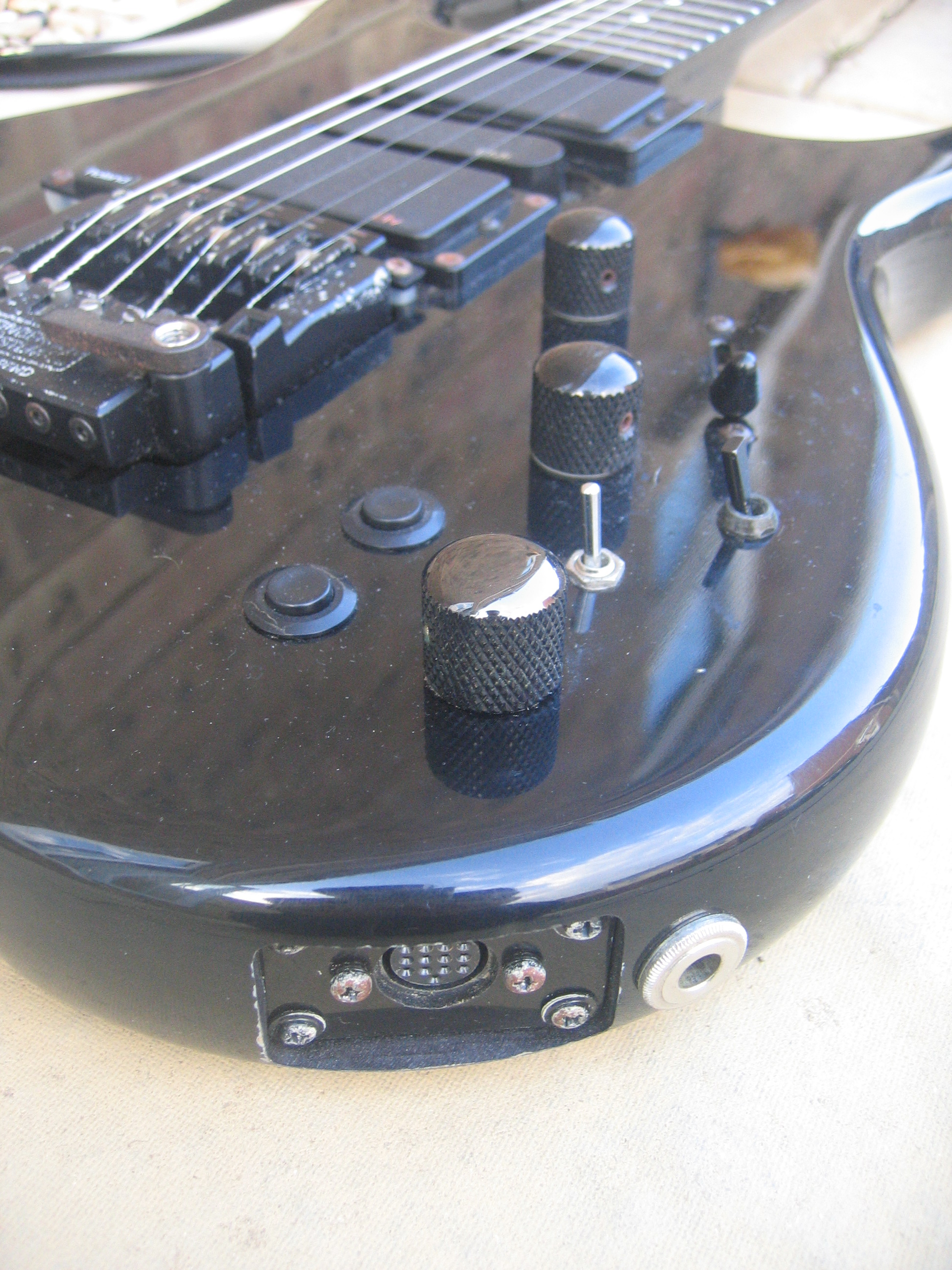
1991 Steinberger Sceptre with added Roland GK2 hexaphonic pickup and its 13-pin connector

Hexaphonic pickups (also called divided pickups and polyphonic pickups) have a separate output for each string (Hexaphonic assumes six strings, as on a guitar). This allows for separate processing and amplification for each string. It also allows a converter to sense the pitch coming from individual string signals for producing note commands, typically according to the MIDI (musical instrument digital interface) protocol. A hexaphonic pickup and a converter are usually components of a guitar synthesizer.

Such pickups are uncommon (compared to normal ones), and only a few notable models exist, like the piezoelectric pickups on the Moog Guitar. Hexaphonic pickups can be either magnetic or piezoelectric or based on the condenser principle like electronicpickups

== See also ==
- Contact microphone
- Electric lamellophone
- Electric sitar
- Humbucker
- Index of electronics articles
- Instrument amplifier
- Lace Sensor
- Lipstick pickup
- Magnetic circuit
- Nominal impedance
- Preamplifier
- Reverberation
- Single-coil guitar pickup
- Transformer
