= List of people from Cairo, Illinois =

The following list includes notable people who were born or have lived in Cairo, Illinois. For a similar list organized alphabetically by last name, see the category page People from Cairo, Illinois.

== Academics ==
Name	Image	Birth	Death	Known for	Association	Reference
Mary J. Safford		Dec 31, 1834	Dec 8, 1891	Union army nurse in the US Civil War; professor of Women's Diseases at the Boston University; later became a doctor		
Hudson Strode		Oct 31, 1892	Sep 22, 1976	Author and professor of creative writing at the University of Alabama	Born in Cairo	

== Business ==
Name	Image	Birth	Death	Known for	Association	Reference
William P. Halliday		Jul 21, 1827	Sep 22, 1899	Banker, steamboat captain, owner of the Riverlore mansion, and businessman	Lived in and started several businesses in Cairo	
Charles T. Hinde		Jul 12, 1832	Mar 10, 1915	Riverboat captain, railroad executive, founder of the Hotel del Coronado	Started his own shipping business in Cairo	

== Media ==
Name	Image	Birth	Death	Known for	Association	Reference
Rex Ingram		Oct 20, 1895	Sep 19, 1969	Stage, film, and television actor; first African-American actor to be hired for a contract role on a soap opera (The Brighter Day, The Adventures of Huckleberry Finn, Sahara)	Born in Cairo	
Christopher Jackson		Sep 30, 1975		Actor, singer, musician, and composer; Tony Award-nominated for Broadway performance as George Washington in Hamilton	Graduated from Cairo High School in 1993	

== Military ==
Name	Image	Birth	Death	Known for	Association	Reference
Kelly Taggart		Dec 17, 1932	May 7, 2014	Rear admiral in National Oceanic and Atmospheric Administration Commissioned Officer Corps (NOAA Corps); second director of the NOAA Corps	Born in Cairo	
Winifred Warder		May 22, 1885	Oct 8, 1918	Member of Gas Motor Unit No. 1, Women's Overseas Hospitals; died at American military hospital in Bordeaux, France, during World War I	Born in Cairo	

== Music ==
Name	Image	Birth	Death	Known for	Association	Reference
Ray Butts		Sep 22, 1919	Apr 20, 2003	Inventor of the EchoSonic, a guitar amplifier with a built-in tape echo, and the Filter'Tron pickup, the first humbucker guitar pickup (used extensively on Gretsch guitars)		
Chris Clavin		Aug 23, 1973		Owner of Plan-It-X Records; musician in Ghost Mice		
Ted Joans		Jul 4, 1928	Apr 25, 2003	Musician, poet and painter	Born in Cairo	
Kyle Lehning				Record producer and recording executive	Born in Cairo	
George "Harmonica" Smith		Apr 22, 1924	Oct 2, 1983	Blues musician (harmonica)	Grew up in Cairo	
Henry Townsend		Oct 27, 1909	Sep 24, 2006	Blues musician	Grew up in Cairo	
Estelle Yancey		Jan 1, 1896	Apr 19, 1986	Blues vocalist	Born in Cairo	

== Politics ==
Name	Image	Birth	Death	Known for	Association	Reference
Charles Hayes		Feb 17, 1918	Apr 8, 1997	US congressman for Illinois's 1st congressional district (1983–1993)	Born in Cairo	
Charles Koen (aka Chuck Koen)		1945	July 20, 2018	Civil rights activist; founded the Black Liberators		
Napoleon B. Thistlewood		Mar 30, 1837	Sep 15, 1915	US congressman for Illinois's 25th congressional district (1908–1913)	Two-term mayor of Cairo; died in Cairo	
Richard W. Townshend		Apr 30, 1840	Mar 9, 1889	US congressman for Illinois's 19th congressional district (1877–1889)	Lived in Cairo	
Donne Trotter		Jan 30, 1950		Illinois state senator for Illinois 17th district (1993–2018)	Born in Cairo	

== Religion ==
Name	Image	Birth	Death	Known for	Association	Reference
Gracia Burnham		Jan 17, 1959		Protestant missionary to the Philippines; kidnapped by the Abu Sayyaf	Born in Cairo	

== Sports ==
Name	Image	Birth	Death	Known for	Association	Reference
Chet Covington		Nov 6, 1910	Jun 11, 1976	Pitcher for the Philadelphia Phillies	Born in Cairo	
Vern Curtis		May 24, 1920	Jun 24, 1992	Pitcher for the Washington Senators	Born and died in Cairo	
Egyptian Healy		Oct 27, 1866	Mar 16, 1899	Pitcher for seven Major League Baseball teams	Born in Cairo	
Ed Morgan		May 22, 1904	Apr 9, 1980	Infielder for the Cleveland Indians and Boston Red Sox	Born in Cairo	
Tyrone Nesby		Jan 31, 1976		Small forward for the Los Angeles Clippers and Washington Wizards, as well as four European teams	Born in Cairo	
Caroline Smith		Jul 21, 1906	Nov 10, 1994	Diving gold medalist at 1924 Summer Olympics	Born in Cairo	
Ken Trickey		Aug 30, 1933	Dec 4, 2012	College basketball coach for Oral Roberts University	Raised in Cairo; graduated from and coached at Cairo High School	
