= Ray Butts EchoSonic =

Guitar amplifier

The EchoSonic is a guitar amplifier made by Ray Butts. It was the first portable guitar amplifier with a built-in tape echo effect, and it allowed guitar players to use slapback echo, which dominated 1950s rock and roll guitar playing, on stage. He built the first one in 1953 and sold the second one to Chet Atkins in 1954. He built fewer than seventy of those amplifiers; one of them was bought by Sam Phillips and then used by Scotty Moore on every recording he made with Elvis Presley, from the 1955 hit song "Mystery Train" to the 1968 TV program Comeback Special. Deke Dickerson called the amplifier the Holy Grail of rockabilly music.

== History ==
Ray Butts, an "electronics wiz," owned a music store in Cairo, Illinois, in the early 1950s. By this time, rockabilly and other guitar players (such as Les Paul) had discovered the "slapback" echo effect, which had become generally used but could, however, only be made in a studio setting. Butts thought that maybe guitar players would want to use the effect on stage, and using a Gibson 15-watt amplifier with a pair of 6V6 tubes, he fabricated a combo amplifier with a built-in tape echo for a local guitar player named Bill Gwaltney.

Butts took the second version of his EchoSonic to Nashville, where he looked up Chet Atkins in the phone book; the next night, Atkins used the amp at the Grand Ole Opry, having given Butts $395 and a 100-dollar Fender combo for it (this at a time when a top-of-the-line Fender Twin cost $239). The collaboration between the two produced more than just good advertising for Butts: he helped Atkins set up a recording studio, and in 1954 or 1955, prompted by Atkins, he invented a humbucker pickup which was adopted by Gretsch and introduced in their Atkins-endorsed Gretsch 6120 in 1957 as the FilterTron pickup, creating what would become the legendary "twangy" Gretsch sound. Atkins recorded much of his music of the 1950s with the Echosonic, and in his autobiography spoke of the connection between the amplifier and the humbucker (the first humbucker, according to Atkins, but Gibson patented their PAF before Butts did): the pickups on Atkins Gretsch produced an awful hum in conjunction with an unshielded transformer in the EchoSonic, leading Butts to connect two single-coil pickups in series and out of phase, creating the first humbucker.

Scotty Moore, who at the time was recording with Sam Phillips (whose Sun Studio had the equipment for slapback echo), became aware of the Echosonic from listening to Atkins on the radio and called Butts to have one built for him; according to Moore, this was the third EchoSonic ever built though Dave Hunter claims this is incorrect, that Moore's has serial number 8. He bought the EchoSonic specifically to emulate Atkins's sound, and bought another one in the late 1980s or early 1990s, serial number 24—an amplifier that had belonged to Paul Yandell and that Moore later sold to Deke Dickerson. Since the EchoSonic lacked power for large live venues, Butts later made a set of 50-watt "satellite" amplifiers and cabinets, "to enable Moore's lithe rockabilly riffs to be heard on a stage in front of thousands of screaming Elvis fans."

The combination of Moore's Gibson Super 400 with the Echosonic ("a jazz classic meets a rock'n'roll revolution") became legendary. Soon, many seminal rock and roll players, including Carl Perkins, started using an EchoSonic, which in turn led to other manufacturers producing individual tape echo units that could be used in the studio as well as on stage. One of those tape units was the Echoplex, which started as a copy of the echo unit from an EchoSonic, and became one of the most important echo effects of the twentieth century.

== Description ==
The EchoSonic is a combo amplifier "the size of a traveling salesman's battered suitcase" with, like most tweed amplifiers of the era, the control panel on the top. It has a single 12" speaker (made by University). The first versions produced 15 watts from 2 6V6 tubes but lacked "punch"; by the time Scotty Moore bought his amplifier, Butts had replaced the 6V6s with 6L6 tubes, increasing the output to 25 watts. The pre-amplifier section had four 12AU7s, two 12AY7s, a 12AX7 (originally a 12AD7), and a 6C4. The amplifier has a control for bass/treble (whose functionality (but not implementation) resembles that of a Baxandall circuit), two volume controls for microphone and instrument, and three controls for the echo circuit, but the delay time is not adjustable. The amplifier is delicate and requires a lot of maintenance: tubes run hot, and the echo circuit is delicate and needs frequent cleaning, oiling, and de-magnetizing. But according to amplifier restorer Frank Roy, the wiring is "meticulous", all done point-to-point and with "top-quality components".
