= Fender Cabronita Telecaster =

Series of electric guitars

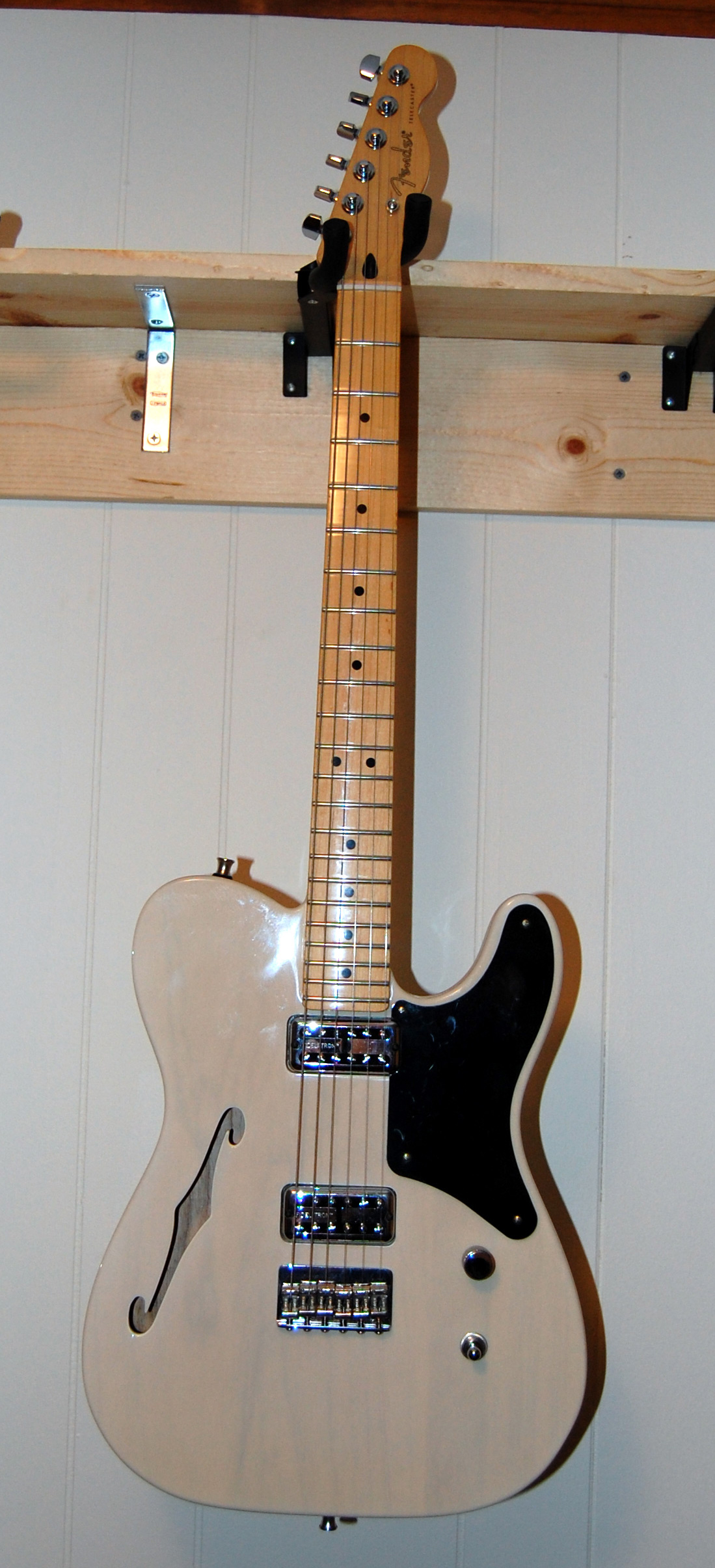
2012 Fender Telecaster Cabronita Thinline, made in Mexico, with Fidelitron pickups, white blonde finish over ash body and maple neck.

The Fender Cabronita Telecaster (or colloquially as Cabronita) is a line of guitars built by Fender Musical Instruments Corporation based on the company's Telecaster body shape. The name Cabronita is Spanish slang and roughly translates as little bastard or little devil. While retaining the shape and general feel of a Telecaster, the series incorporates design elements from Fender's subsidiary Gretsch, notably the brand's Filter'Tron-style pickups. Like all Telecaster submodels, they are labeled simply as a Fender Telecaster on the headstock logo, identifiable only by their features.

== History ==
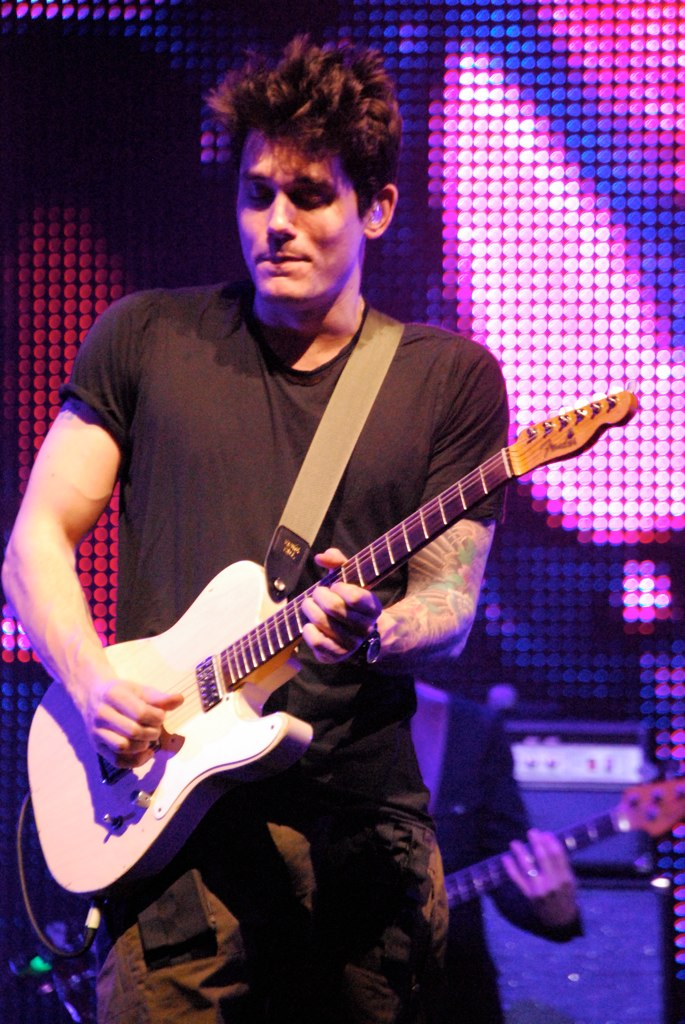
John Mayer playing a Cabronita Telecaster.

Mike Eldred of Fender's Custom Shop began developing what would become the Cabronita in 2007. Eldred wanted to create something that went "against the grain...that was a bit more aggressive" compared to a typical Telecaster, equating the eventual guitar he created to the "asshole cousin" in a family gathering. In designing the Cabronita, he cited his love of custom motorcycles as inspiration to keep the aesthetic simple, as if the guitar could be a project someone was working on in their garage. Eldred chose a larger neck profile for the Cabronita, feeling the tonal effect of its thickness paired well with the choice to use Filter'Tron-style pickups, specifically "TV Classics" from manufacturer TV Jones. Eldred sent the prototype to John Mayer and early models were given to Keith Urban and Billy Gibbons as well.

The Cabronita debuted in 2009 as the La Cabronita Especial, which had to be handmade by the Custom Shop and as a result commanded a high price tag. The concept became popular though, and many Telecaster owners began modifying their guitars to imitate the Cabronita look, while parts suppliers started offering Telecaster-style bodies routed for Filter'Tron pickups.

In 2011, Fender marketed what it called its "Tele-Bration" year (a portmanteau of Telecaster and Celebration). This was the 60th anniversary of the Telecaster design, which was the original design by Leo Fender and the world's first successful, mass-produced, bolt-on neck guitar. As part of this, the American made Cabronita was created. Like the Custom Shop versions, these used TV Jones TV Classic pickups, but in a limited color palette, and always with two pickups. The tone knob was deleted and, in its place, was a three-way switch. This switch was a simple toggle design rather than a blade design, which was perceived as unusual for a Telecaster. These models were only manufactured for a short period of time. They cost slightly more than a Fender American Standard guitar but priced at a fraction of a Custom Shop version.

The following year, Fender began production of a less expensive Cabronita by shifting production to its Ensenada, Mexico factory and using its own Fidelitron pickups, under its Classic Series line of Telecasters. This pickup was similar in both look and design to the TV Jones pickup, sharing the same basic dimensions and mounting style. Although the tone was different, it still provided a high quality sound. Like the American version, the Mexican built (often informally abbreviated as MIM for Made in Mexico) had two pickups, a single volume control, and a three-way switch. At the same time, the company also produced a Thinline version (semi-hollow) that was identical except for the body type. Most were built of alder, with the single exception of the white blonde models that used swamp ash, which allowed the grain to show through the translucent white finish. Unlike most imported Telecasters, it had 22 frets.

Around the same time, the company began production of two Cabronita models under its Squier subsidiary, which is a sister brand of Fender and features more affordable entry-level instruments. These "Vintage Modified Cabronita" models included one that had two of the Fender Fidelitron pickups and was very similar to the Mexican built versions. A second model with had the Fidelitron pickup in the neck position, but opted for a traditional Telecaster single coil pickup in the bridge, plus a licensed version of the Bigsby B5 vibrato system, something not offered on any of the North American guitars. These were built in Indonesia and featured a 22 fret neck and vintage style tuners as well as single volume and 3 way toggle switch. The company used basswood bodies and were offered exclusively with a black polyurethane finish.

== Unique features ==
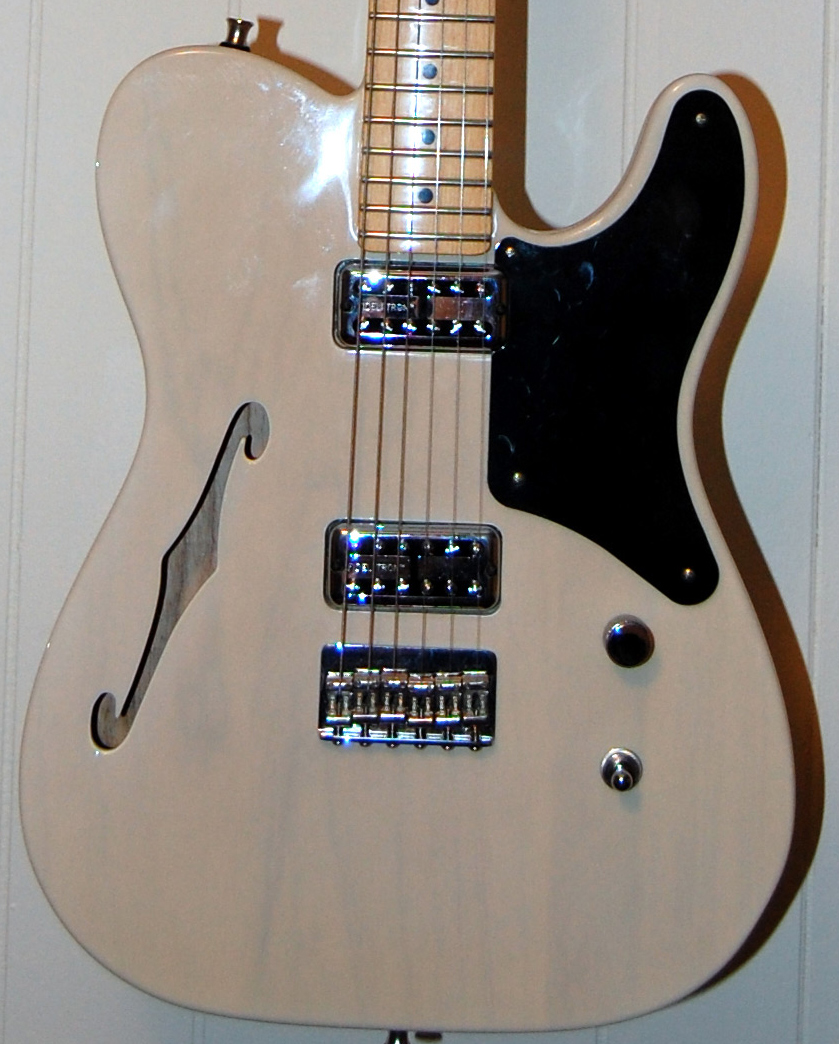
Closeup view of a Thinline model.

Most Telecasters use two single coil pickups, although over the years a large number of variations have existed that has utilized one pickup, three pickups, one or two humbucking pickups or a blend of these. The pickguard is sometimes modified as are the electronics, but many were more or less the same guitar with subtle differences. The Cabronita arguably drifted farthest away from the original Telecaster, using only the body shape.

The pickguard is quite small compared to most, and clearly is influenced by the first couple of prototypes built by Leo Fender back in 1949. Unlike other models, it does not extend over the area of the neck pickup. In most models, the pickguard has squared edges instead of beveled, is a single ply material in either black or white, and is designed very simplistically, as is the rest of the guitar.

The majority of Telecaster have always had the controls mounted to a chrome plated, steel plate, going back to the prototype. The first production model using this plate was in 1951 and it has not changed in specification since, making it an identifying Telecaster feature. A few models instead had the electronics mounted to an extended pickguard, but the Cabronita has the electronics fed from the back of the guitar, and mounted through the wood of the guitar. While common for many other guitar brands, this was a first for a Telecaster.

Most Cabronitas have two pickups but do not have a tone control. This is another first for the Telecaster. A tone control can be added aftermarket by using a stacked potentiometer, but many argue that dropping the tone control gives the instrument a bit more sparkle and highs in the tone, as a tone control filters some of the higher frequencies even when set to the highest level.

The most striking and obvious difference is the use of TV Jones or Fidelitron pickups, both of which are based on Gretsch designs. Gretsch was the first to have a patent approved for a humbucking pickup although Gibson had filed two years earlier, but there are significant differences in their designs. Gretsch pickups are said to have more of a jangle in their tone whereas Gibson humbuckers are more full bodied in tone and slightly larger. Over time, the Gibson design became the standard for humbucker pickups, although the Gretsch design has a smaller but significant following. The TV Jones Classic pickups are a modified and arguably improved version of the Gretsch Filter'Tron. Similarly, the Fender Fidelitron is based on the Filter'Tron design, although they have a tone more akin to a single coil pickup, the tone most associated with Fender.

With the exception of the Squier model that uses a Bigsby vibrato, all the Fender branded Cabronitas use what is typically called a hardtail Stratocaster bridge, meaning it wasn't designed for a tremolo system. This is used on other models of Telecaster that have a humbucking pickup in the bridge position, although humbuckers are rarely used as OEM equipment on Telecasters. Regardless of country of origin, all Cabronita models feature a one piece maple neck and 22 medium jumbo frets as well as a 9.5 inch fingerboard radius, the common modern "C" shape, and either a 42.8mm wide nut (US built) or 42mm wide nut (Indonesia and Mexico built).

== Aftermath ==
The name and translation of Cabronita essentially means a bastardized version of a Telecaster, as the design choices go against many of the traditional designs by Leo Fender. While the allure and demand for these particular models is dwarfed by traditional Telecasters, there is still a significant following that has developed in a short period of time. As such, it has spawned a host of aftermarket bodies and parts that conform to the Cabronita template, which itself has become a new standard. Traditional Gretsch Filter'Tron pickups may be used if a guitarist wants a warmer tone than the newer offerings. TV Jones has taken a number of pickup models and made them available in the same size format that the Cabronita (and Gretsch) uses. Like the original and subsequent Telecasters, the Cabronita is an easy to modify guitar with a simplified electronics system, well suited for aftermarket modification.

== Gallery ==
While there are several models that fall under the Cabronita title, they all feature at least one Gretsch style pickup and the prototype style pickguard.

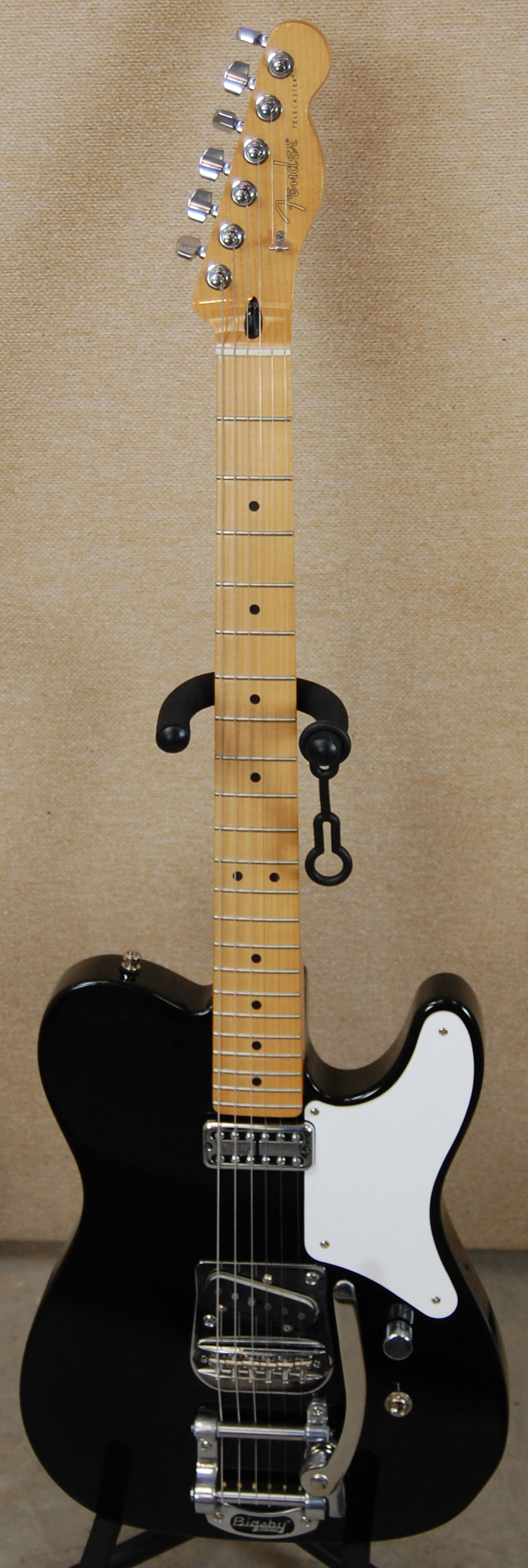
Heavily modified 2012 Squier Vintage Modified Cabronita with TV Jones neck pickup, Fender Texas Special bridge pickups added, plus added Fender neck (Mexico). Originally made in Indonesia, with Mexican and American parts added aftermarket.

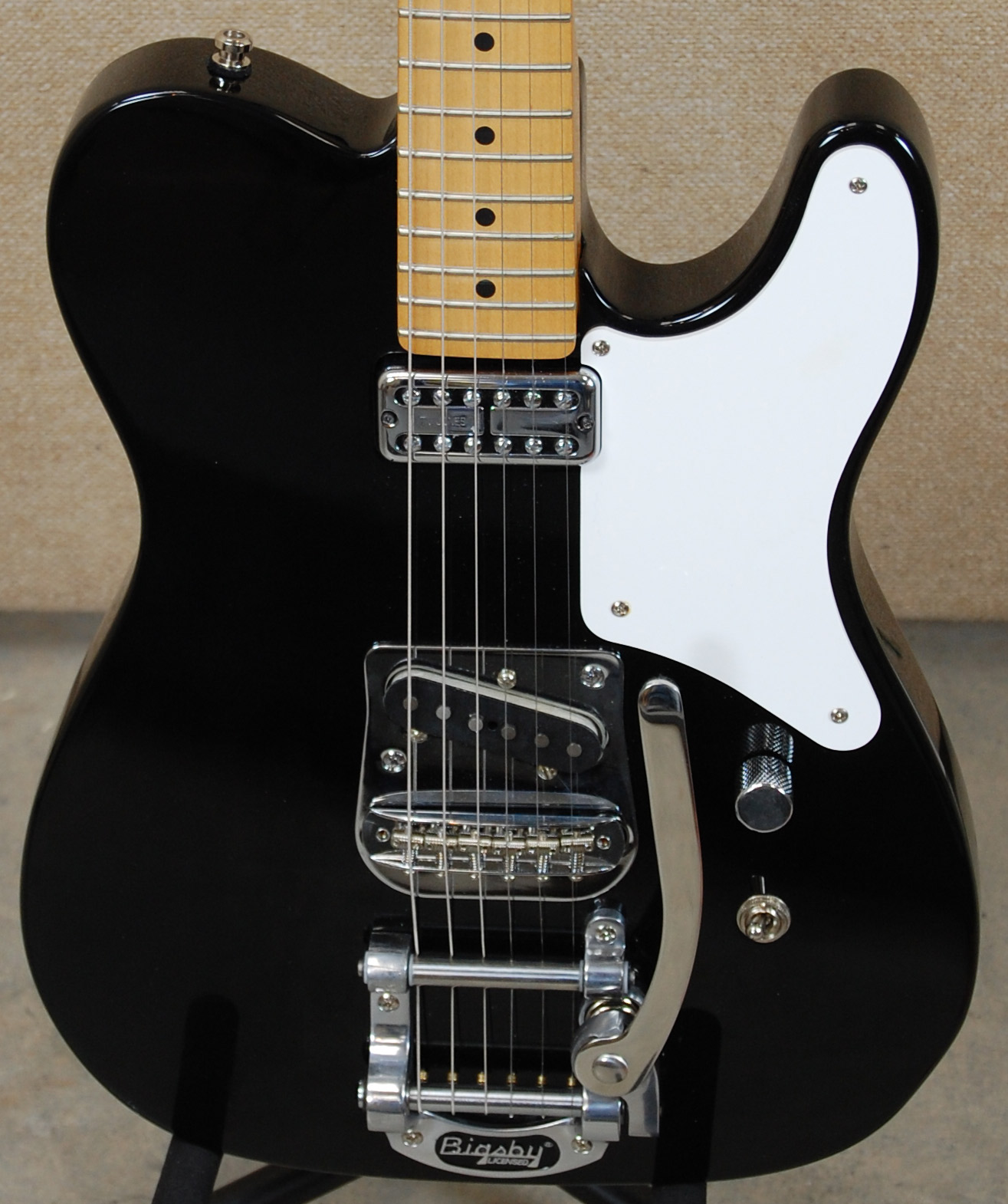
Closeup of Squier. Note traditional Telecaster single coil pickup and stock Bigsby vibrato.

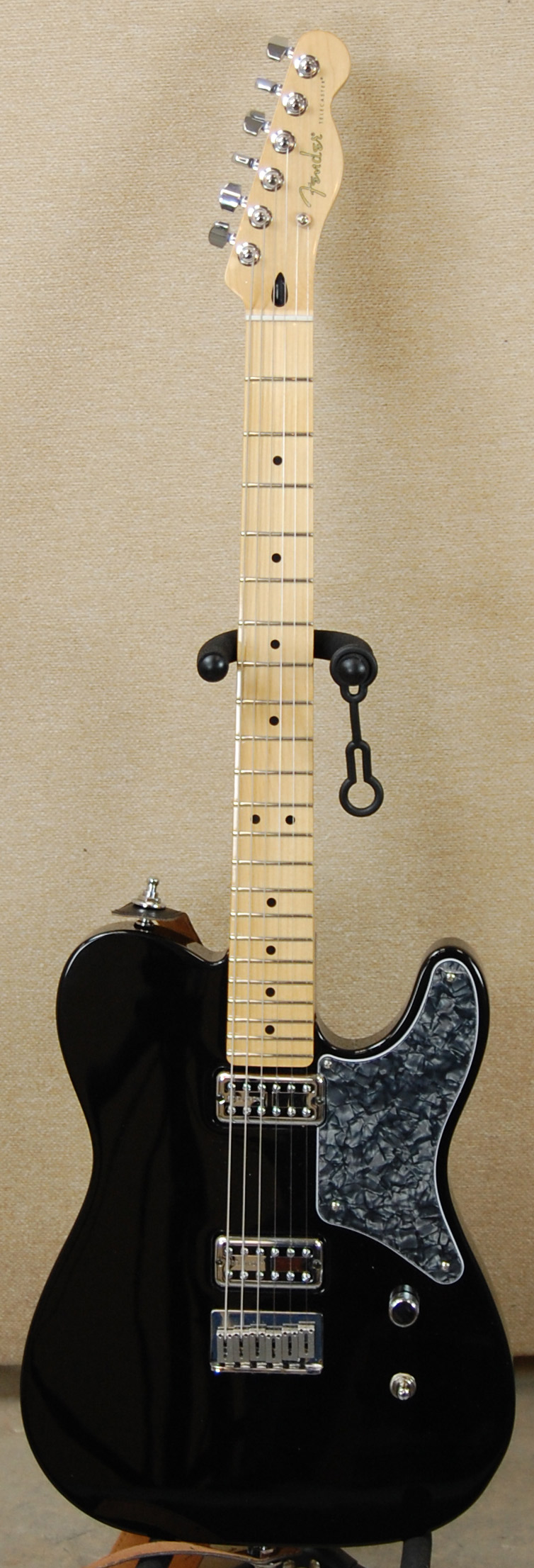
2013 Fender Telecaster Cabronita with Fidelitron pickups, made in Mexico. Stock except for pickguard (original was white) and bridge.

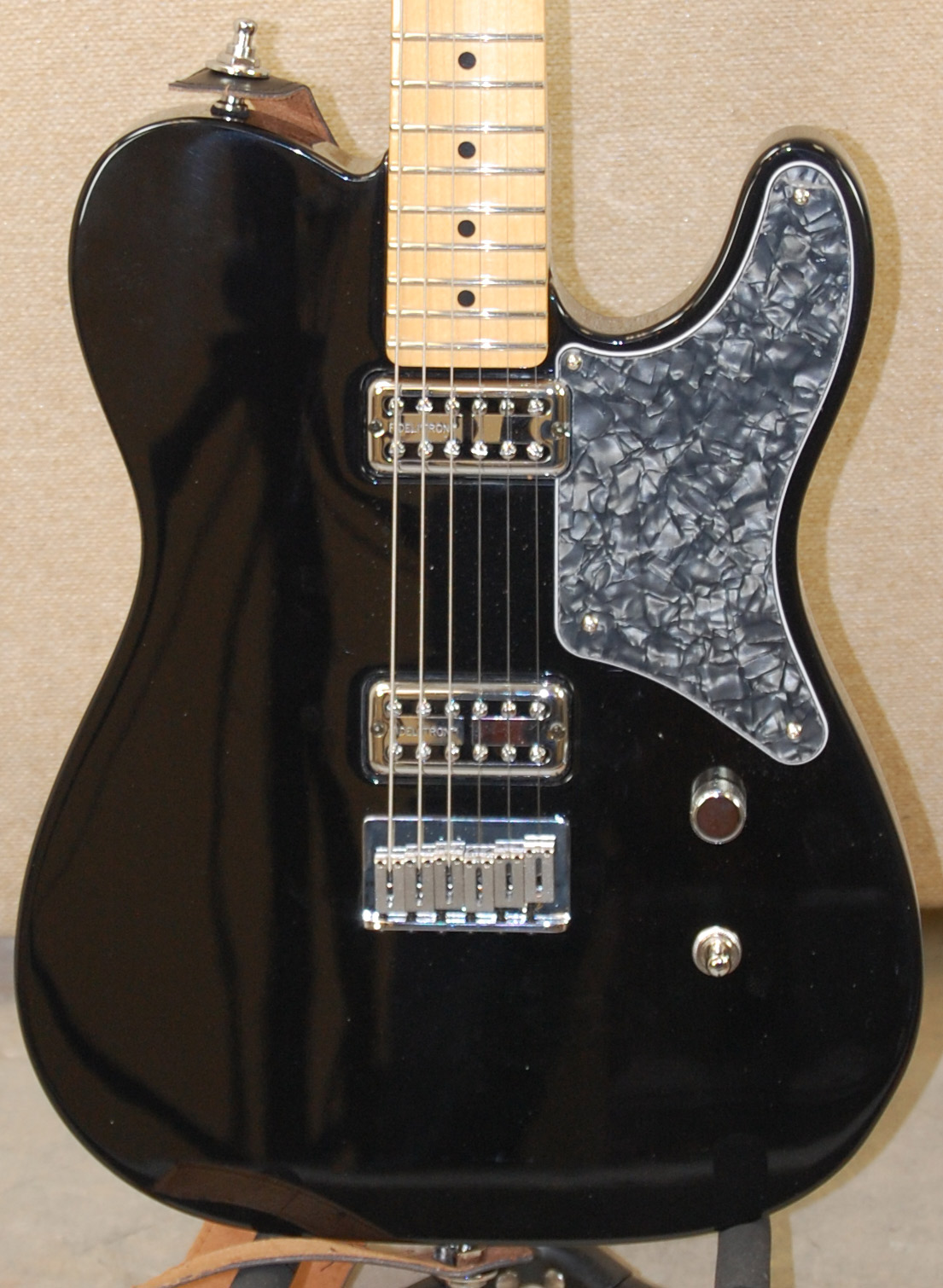
Closeup of Fender. Bridge replaced with American hardtail Stratocaster bridge.
