= Filter'Tron =

Guitar pickup

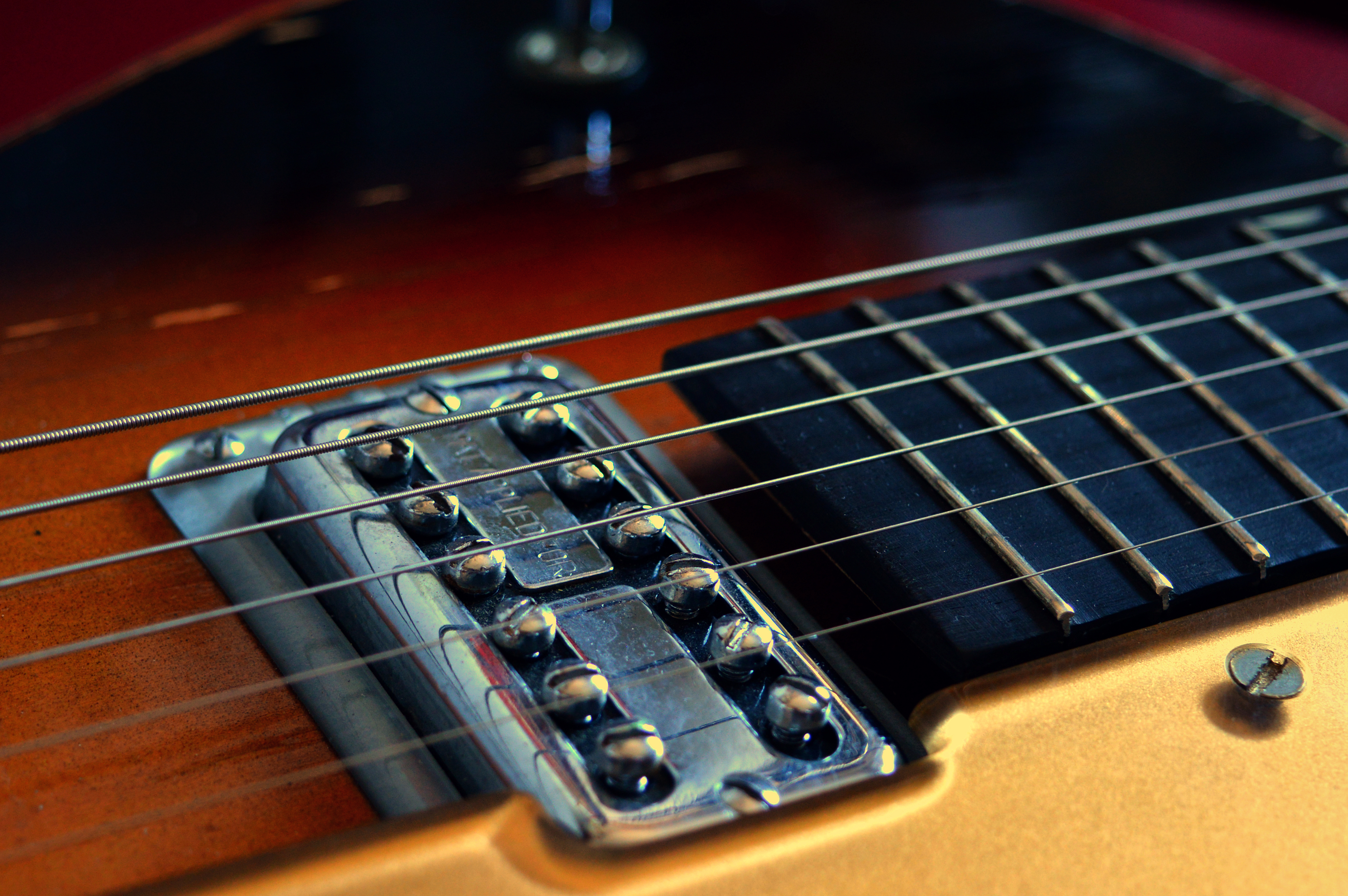
- Manufacturer: Gretsch
- Period: 1957–present
- Type: Passive Humbucker
- Magnet type: Alnico 5

Output specifications
- Impedance, kΩ: ~3–5

The Filter'Tron (often written as Filtertron) is an early model of the humbucker guitar pickup invented by Ray Butts. (Note: It is often erroneously debated whether the Filter'Tron or Gibson's P.A.F. was the first humbucker pickup. Humbucking pickups were already being produced as early as the 1930s by multiple companies. Les Paul reportedly designed humbucking pickups using dummy coils in the 1940s. See first citation.) Butts built the prototype Filter'Tron in 1954 for guitarist Chet Atkins and it was manufactured by Gretsch and installed in almost all of the brand's guitars beginning in 1957. Gretsch guitars and the "growl" and "twang" of their Filter'Trons were a major part of the sound of early rock and roll, with adopters like Bo Diddley, Duane Eddy, George Harrison, and Neil Young. After a sharp decline in popularity in the 1970s and early 1980s, the Gretsch brand and Filter'Tron sound experienced a revival when Gretsch aficionado Brian Setzer renewed public interest in the rockabilly genre. Gretsch guitars have since become popular among new generations of guitarists, especially in rock music, and many manufacturers now offer Filter'Tron-style pickups.

== Tone ==
Filter'Tron pickups are often described as bridging the gap between Fender single coils and Gibson humbuckers. Guitar World wrote that their sound is "warm and round, but also edgy and commanding. Gretsches twang like nothing else on earth." Guitar.com observed that Filter'Trons are not as powerful as humbuckers or P-90s, but not as bright as Fender's single coil pickups; instead, they "fuse hazy clarity, twang and midrange growl" in their own unique and pleasing way.

== History ==
=== Development ===
By the mid-1950s, Chet Atkins was one of the world's most famous guitar players and the first endorser of Gretsch guitars. However, he was displeased with the 60-cycle hum of the single coil pickups used in his signature 6120 guitar model and complained to his friend Ray Butts, an inventor and amp builder from Cairo, Illinois. Butts spent considerable time developing his "hum-bucking" design, ultimately settling on a design that connected two single coil pickups serially and out of phase so that each coil canceled out the other's hum. He demonstrated his pickups to Atkins in Nashville in 1954. Impressed, Atkins installed a prototype set in a red 6120 he was using for recording at the time. This guitar would later be photographed for the cover of his 1956 album, Finger-Style Guitar.

In 1955, Butts began pitching Gretsch on adopting his new pickup design, pointing out its advantages over the brand's existing DeArmond-produced single coils. Atkins too encouraged Gretsch to use Butts' new pickups and, after receiving samples, Fred Gretsch agreed to manufacture them in-house and pay Butts royalties. Butts and Gretsch employee Jimmie Webster collaborated on the production model, which Gretsch marketed as the "Filter'Tron Electronic Guitar Head", or "Filter'Tron", as the pickup was designed to filter out the electronic hum of single-coil pickups.

=== Conflict with Gibson ===
Butts was not the only one working on a humbucker pickup design at the time, learning of Seth Lover's P.A.F. in 1956. Butts wrote to Gibson to inform them of his own work. Gibson president Ted McCarty was initially cautious about potential similarities in their humbucking designs in his response, while noting the company had filed the patent for the P.A.F. the prior year. However, McCarty wrote Butts a second time upon learning that Chet Atkins was already publicly performing with Filter'Trons—Atkins was first photographed doing so that year with a black 6120 on the Grand Ole Opry. With the P.A.F. a year away from being available, McCarty suggested to Butts he could take legal action against him if he did not cease production or obtain a license from Gibson. In response, Butts asserted that he had already built working prototypes that he believed predated Lover's design, and further stated that his lawyers strongly believed Gibson was the actual infringer. It is not known if McCarty responded.

Gretsch debuted the Filter'Tron pickup at the 1957 NAMM Convention, the same show Gibson introduced the P.A.F. While there was tension between the two companies, Gibson and Gretsch eventually agreed that Lover and Butts had independently invented their pickups and the timing was coincidence.

=== Patent ===
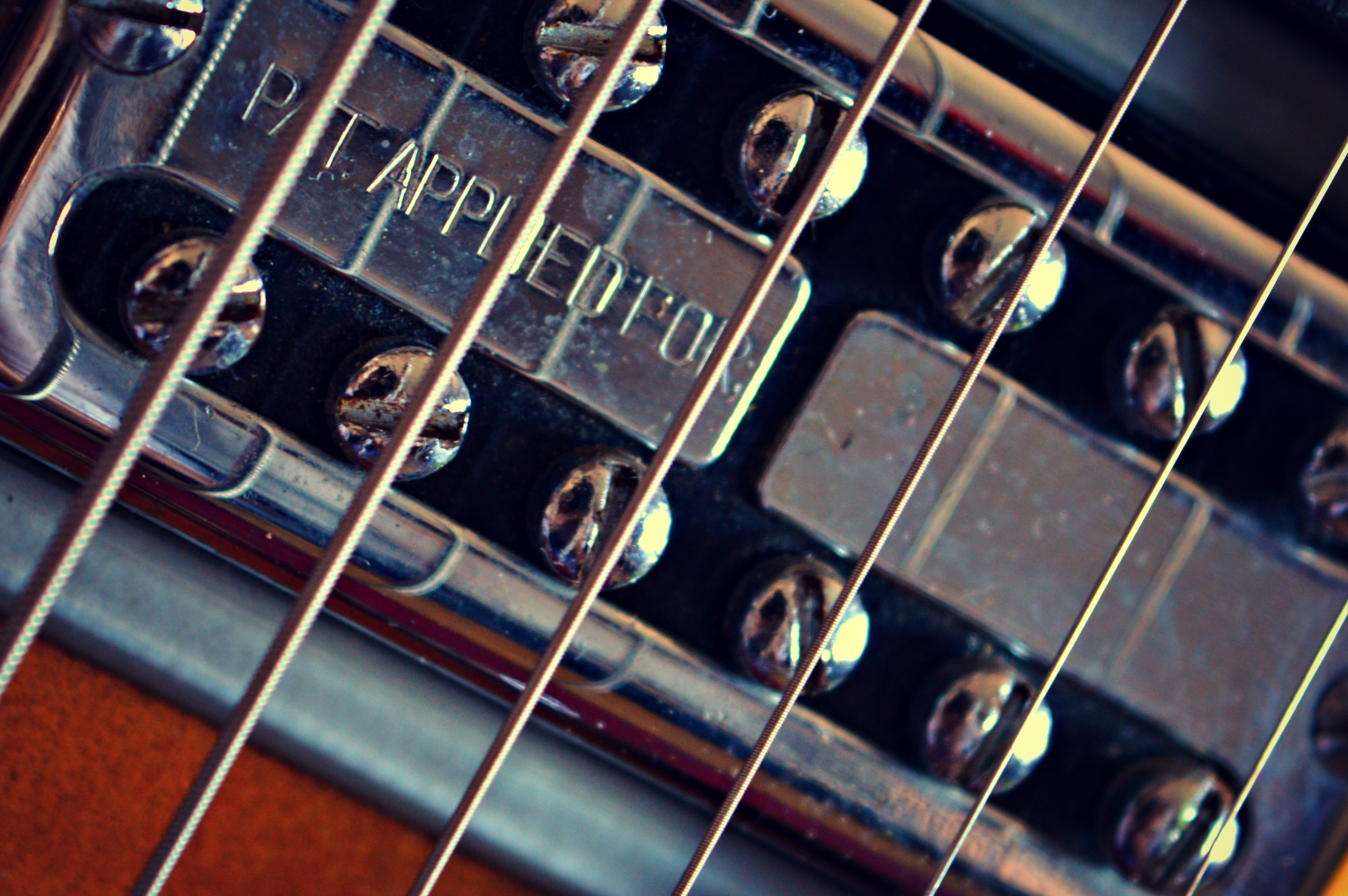
A Filter'Tron pickup bearing the early "Pat. Applied For" text.

Butts would go on to receive the patent for the Filter'Tron design on June 30, 1959, a month before Lover would receive his patent for the P.A.F., although Lover had filed first. Even after receiving the patent, Gretsch continued using front pickup covers pre-stamped with "PAT. APPLIED FOR" text into 1960, when the company finally ran out of them. Gretsch then began stamping the covers with "U.S. PAT 2892371."

=== Production ===
Gretsch began fitting their guitars with Filter'Trons in 1957, and the brand would eventually use them in almost all of their models.

Following the Baldwin Piano Company's purchase of Gretsch in 1967 and its subsequent decline in quality, the design of the Filter'Tron was altered multiple times, changing to ceramic magnets and different pole pieces and covers, before the Filter'Tron was replaced completely. New variants produced included the Blacktop Filter’Tron, HiLo’Tron, Mega'Tron, and Super'Tron. During this time, TV Jones earned a reputation for producing the most vintage-accurate Filter'Tron-style pickups.

Fender acquired Gretsch in 2003, returning the pickup design to its original specs, and installed them in not just Gretsch guitars, but Fender models as well, such as the Cabronita Telecaster.

== Players ==
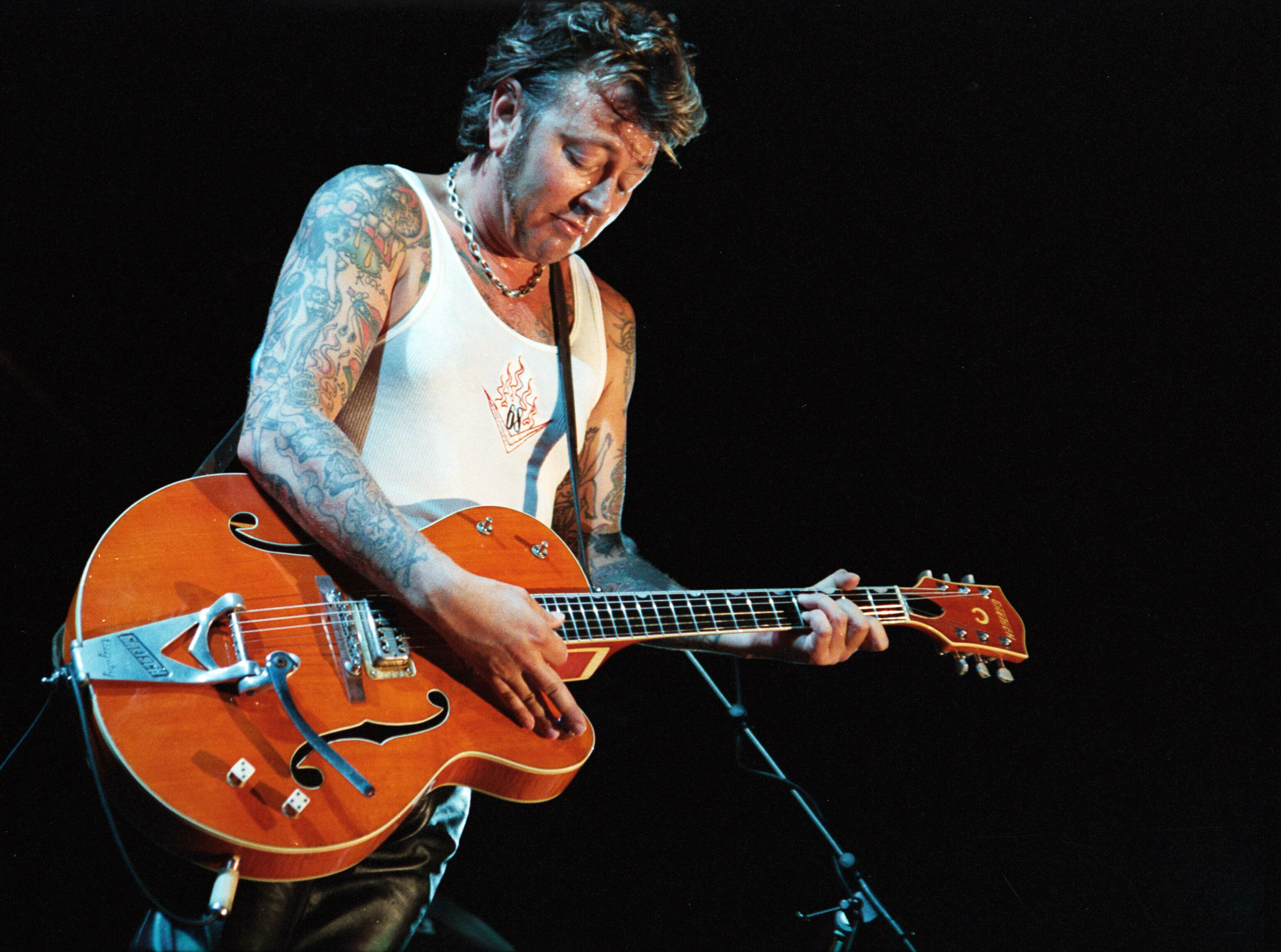
Brian Setzer and a Filter'Tron-loaded Gretsch guitar.

Chet Atkins' endorsement of his Filter'Tron-equipped Gretsch 6120 helped the company to sell thousands of guitars. Early rock and roll star Duane Eddy traded in his Gibson Les Paul for an orange 6120 that he recorded numerous hit records on, earning the nickname "The King of Twang." Fellow rock and roller Eddie Cochran would also use and popularize Gretsch and the 6120. Filter'Trons were installed on Atkins' second signature guitar with Gretsch, the Country Gentleman, which George Harrison played during the Beatles' first appearance on The Ed Sullivan Show, causing Gretsch sales to soar. The "Great Gretsch Sound" would become popular with many bands of the British Invasion, like the Rolling Stones, the Who, and the Animals, as well as other artists popular in the 1960s like Neil Young and Stephen Stills.

However, because Filter'Trons were largely associated with big-bodied Gretsch guitars that did not suit rock's increasingly aggressive sound and style, the brand and pickups fell out of favor in the 1970s and Gretsch guitars ceased production early in the following decade. AC/DC guitarist Malcolm Young was a notable Gretsch player during these down years. The brand's fate changed, however, when Brian Setzer, a Gretsch enthusiast, revived public interest in the rockabilly genre and its twangy guitar tone. Gretsch guitars returned to popularity (and production) in the hands of new generations of guitarists, including Johnny Marr of the Smiths, the Edge of U2, Chris Cornell of Soundgarden, Jack White of the White Stripes, Tim Armstrong of Rancid, and Patrick Stump of Fall Out Boy.

== Design ==
Gretsch used semi-transparent nylon bobbins for the Filter'Tron that were much smaller than Gibson's, enabling the pole screws of each bobbin to be placed closer together. This narrowed the pickup's area of focus, similar to later mini-humbuckers. Coils were machine-wound using 42 AWG plain enamel magnet wire and left unpotted. Filter'Trons have a low output, typically reading between 4k and 5k ohms, while using 1/4"-thick Alnico bar magnets—double the thickness used by Gibson. Additionally, the pole screws are longer, resulting in a stronger magnetic field.
