= P.A.F. (pickup) =

Guitar pickup

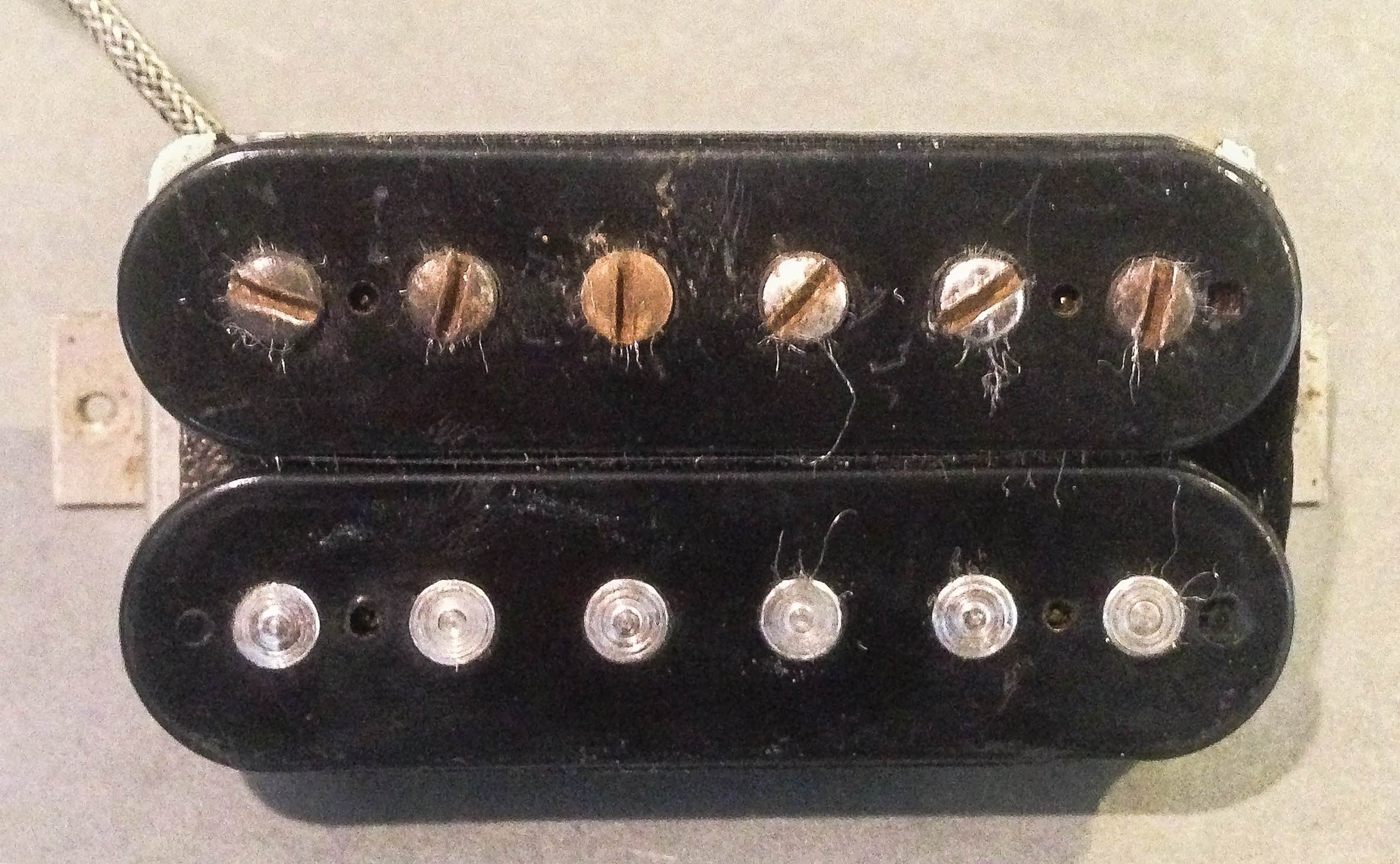
- Manufacturer: Gibson Guitar Corporation
- Period: 1956–1975
- Type: Passive Humbucker
- Magnet type: 1956–1960: Alnico 2, 3, and 5; 1961–1975: Alnico 5

Output specifications
- Voltage (RMS), V: 127 mV at 7.715 kHz
- Impedance, kΩ: 1956–1961: ~7.5–9.5; 1961–1965: 7.25–7.75; 1965–1975: 7.5

Sonic qualities
- Resonant frequency, Hz: 7.715 kHz

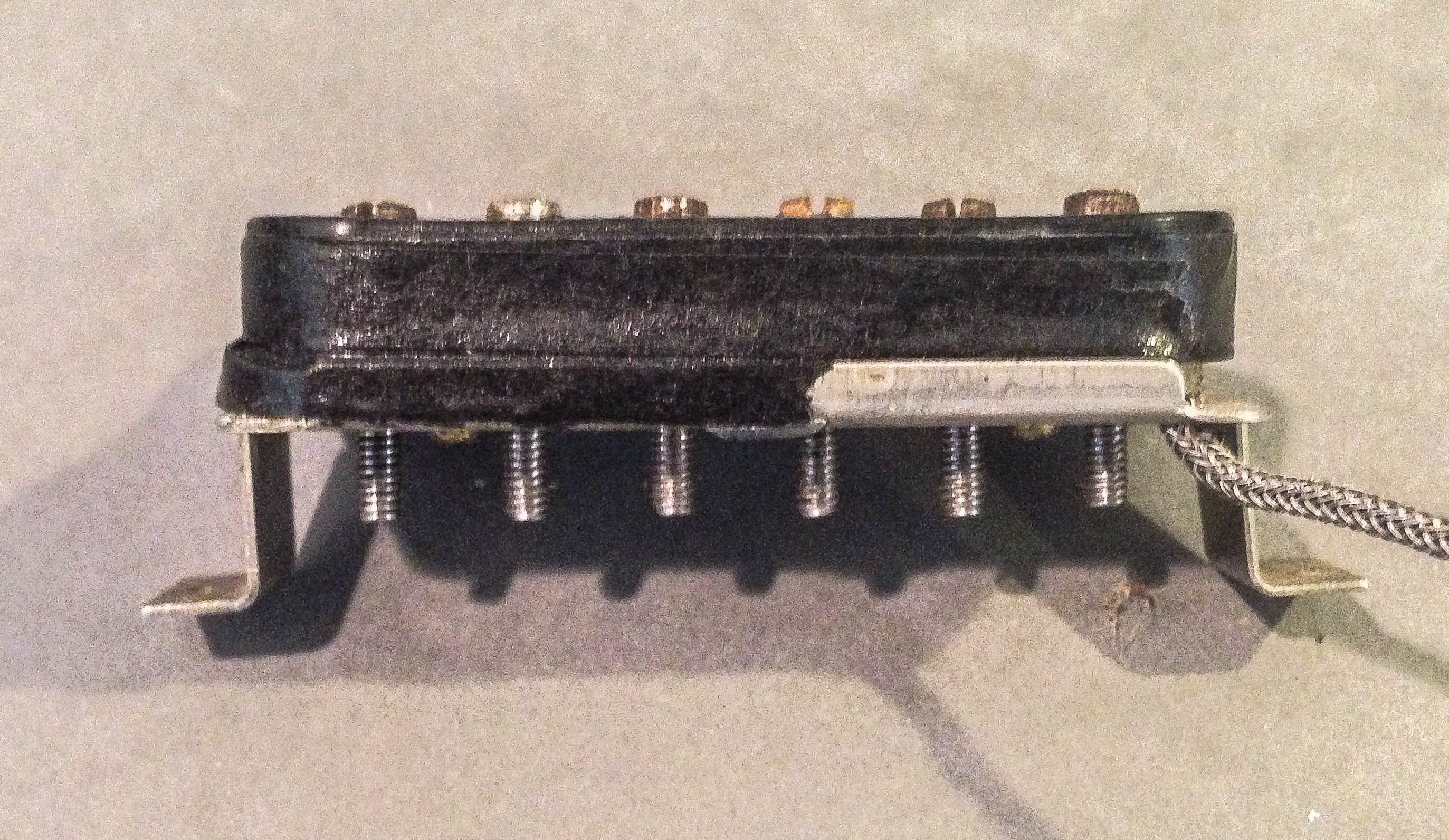
PAF side view

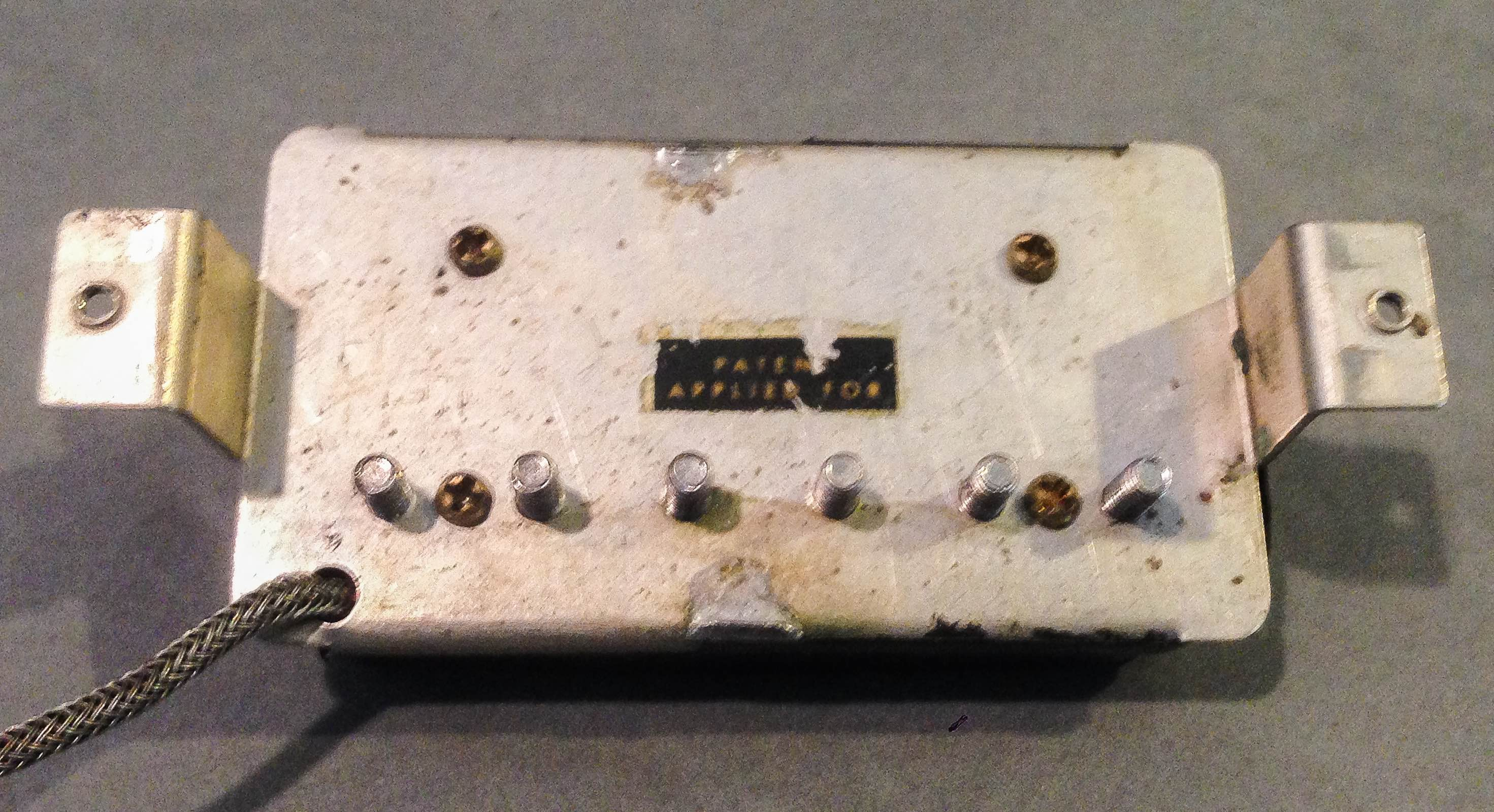
PAF bottom view

A P.A.F., or simply PAF ("Patent Applied For"), is an early model of the humbucker guitar pickup invented by Seth Lover in 1955, so named for the "Patent Applied For" decal placed on the baseplate of each pickup. Gibson used the P.A.F. on guitars from late 1956 until late 1962, long after the patent was granted. They were replaced by the Patent Number (Pat No) pickup, essentially a refined version of the P.A.F. These were in turn replaced by "T-Top" humbuckers in 1967, and production ended in 1975. Though it was not the first humbucking pickup ever, it was the first to gain widespread use, as the P.A.F.'s hum-free signal, tonal clarity, and touch sensitivity when paired with overdriven amplifiers made the pickups popular with rock and blues guitarists. The P.A.F. is an essential tonal characteristic of the now-famous 1957–1960 Gibson Les Paul Standard guitars, and pickups of this type have gained a large following.

== History ==
=== Development ===
In the mid-1950s Gibson looked to create a new guitar pickup different from existing popular single coil designs. Gibson had already developed the Charlie Christian pickup and P-90 in the 1930s and 40s; however, these designs—like competitor Fender's single-coil pickups—were fraught with inherent 60-cycle hum sound interference.

Engineer and Gibson employee Seth Lover had developed a hum-canceling circuit for amplifier power supplies and suspected the same concept could be applied to guitar pickups. Ted McCarty authorized the project and Lover spent much of 1954 working on this noise-cancelling or "hum-bucking" pickup design. By early 1955, the design was completed. Rather than routing two single coil pickups in parallel, Lover had "routed two coils with opposite wind and polarity together in series, which caused each coil to cancel out the other’s hum." The design was given the part code P-490 and in June 1955, Lover and Gibson filed a joint patent. The original design called explicitly for Alnico 5 magnets, but early examples can be Alnico 2, Alnico 3, or Alnico 5.

Around the same time Lover was developing his P.A.F., Ray Butts was working on his own humbucker, the Filter'Tron, which would be adopted by Gretsch. In 1956, McCarty threatened legal action over design similarities between the P.A.F. and Filter'Tron upon learning that Chet Atkins was already performing with Butts' pickups. Butts, however, claimed to have created his humbucker first and no legal action was ever taken, with Gibson and Gretsch mutually agreeing Lover and Butts had arrived at their designs independently and at the same time.

=== Early use ===
Gibson began switching from P-90s to P.A.F.s first on the company's lap steel guitars in 1956, and then on electric guitars debuted at the NAMM Convention in 1957. Les Paul Goldtops and Customs were the first solid-body electric guitars to receive P.A.F. humbuckers, and Gibson's ES Series were the first hollow/semi-hollow designs to receive them.

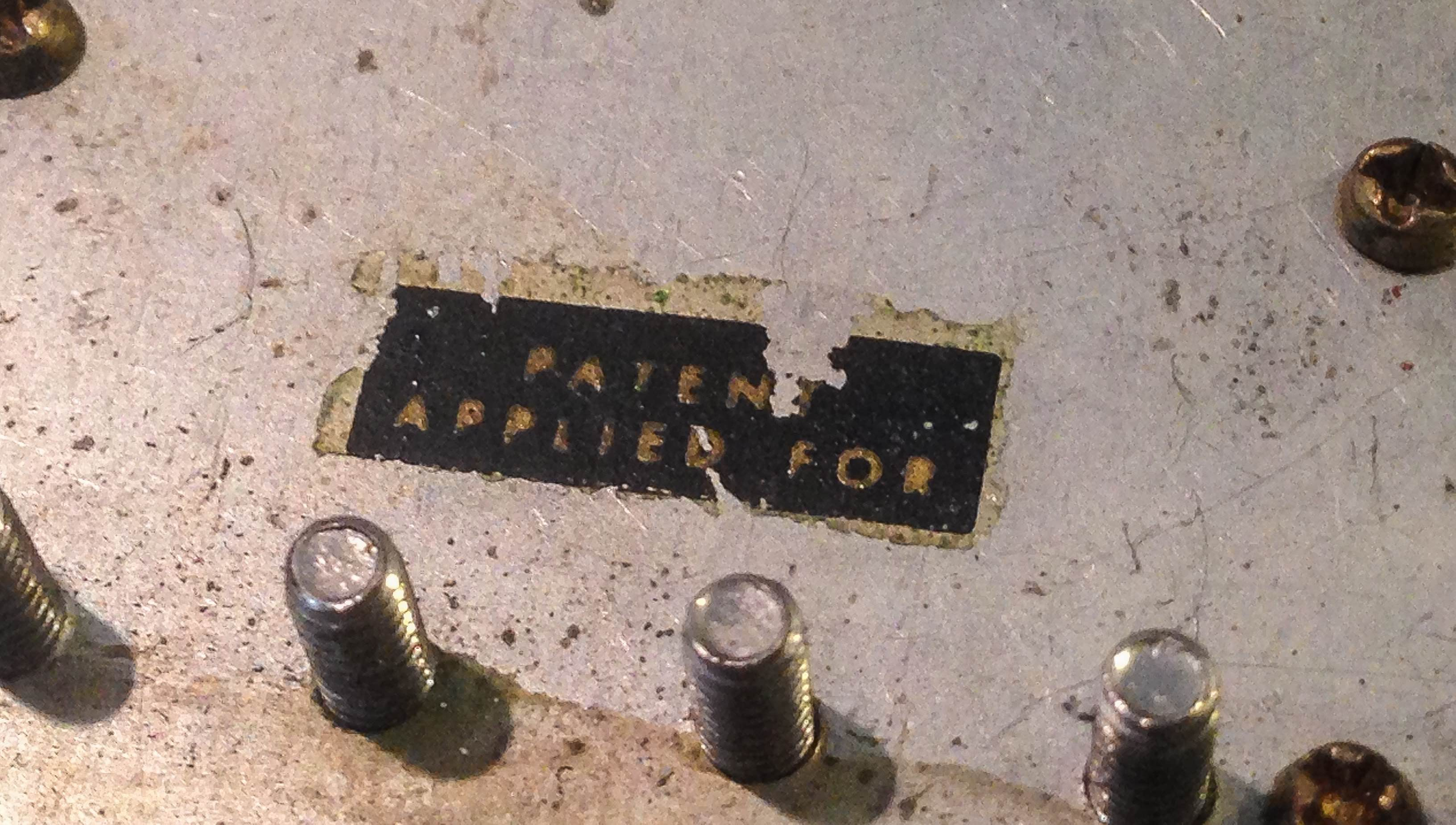
Close-up of a "Patent Applied For" sticker

The Les Pauls of 1957 featured a black sticker with gold lettering applied to each pickup's underside, reading "PATENT APPLIED FOR." Over time the Patent Applied For sticker present on these pickups has evolved into the initialism P.A.F. as a way to identify pickups with this sticker. The patent for Gibson's design (US patent 2896491) was eventually issued on July 28, 1959.

In 1958, the Goldtop model was dropped from production, and the sunburst Standard took its place. These guitars were all fitted with P.A.F. humbuckers, which contributed greatly to the instruments' sound.

=== 1961–1966 ===
Early 1961 P.A.F.s are almost exactly identical to the original 1957–1960 P.A.F.s. In July 1961, Gibson standardized the P.A.F. construction process with the introduction of the SG model. With this, smaller Alnico 5 magnets became standard. Transition to a new start lead location and a more formal number of wire winds was also introduced, leading to pickup DC resistance to center around 7.5kΩ. In addition, around 1963 these pickups were given a new sticker that had a patent number written on it. However, the stickers were, and continued to be, labelled with "U.S. patent 2,737,842", which is the number issued to the 1952 Les Paul trapeze tailpiece design and not the humbucking pickups. Between 1965 and 1966, Gibson switched to polyurethane-coated wire from enamel-coated to cut costs and streamline pigtail lead soldering time, changing the wire color from purple to red.

=== 1967–1980 ===
Around the time of the last small-guard SG's offered in early 1966, Gibson standardized a T-shaped tool mark on the top of humbucker bobbins. This new style of Gibson humbucker became known as the T-Top. The "T" located on the top of the bobbins helped workers ensure the bobbin was facing the correct way during the winding and assembly process. T-Top bobbins lose the distinctive square hole of the original PAF bobbins. In addition the coil former geometry of the T-Top bobbin differs from the coil former dimensions of P.A.F. bobbins making T-Top bobbins slightly taller and more robust internally than P.A.F. bobbins. Early T-Top humbuckers retain the same patent number sticker on the baseplate into the early 1970s. These early patent sticker T-Top humbuckers have the same wood spacer and short A2 and A5 magnets of the previous iteration. Eventually the patent sticker on the baseplate was replaced by a stamped patent number. With this change, other specification began to change such as magnet specifications and use of a plastic rather than wooden spacer. Gibson produced T-Top pickups through 1980 but many consider the early patent sticker T-Tops more collectible than later versions.

=== Trademark dispute ===
While P.A.F. pickups are closely associated with Gibson guitars, the brand never offered them for sale, as selling individual pickups did not become commonplace until DiMarzio pioneered the replacement pickup market in the 1970s. DiMarzio was granted the trademark for "PAF"—omitting the periods—in 1978, with the company claiming to have been the first to use the term in commerce in 1976, in reference to their "PAF"-branded pickups that sought to recreate the original P.A.F. sound. DiMarzio argued this use was legally distinct from Gibson's use of the original "patent applied for" stickers. In 2023, Gibson filed to cancel DiMarzio's PAF trademark, arguing that DiMarzio never had a right to the term "PAF" as it had no related patents and that widespread use of "PAF" had rendered it generic and un-trademarkable. DiMarzio has opposed Gibson's claims, arguing Gibson is time-barred from challenging DiMarzio's trademark and that Gibson had failed to make any allegations "related to the association in the public imagination between the [trade]marks at issue and DiMarzio."

== Sound ==
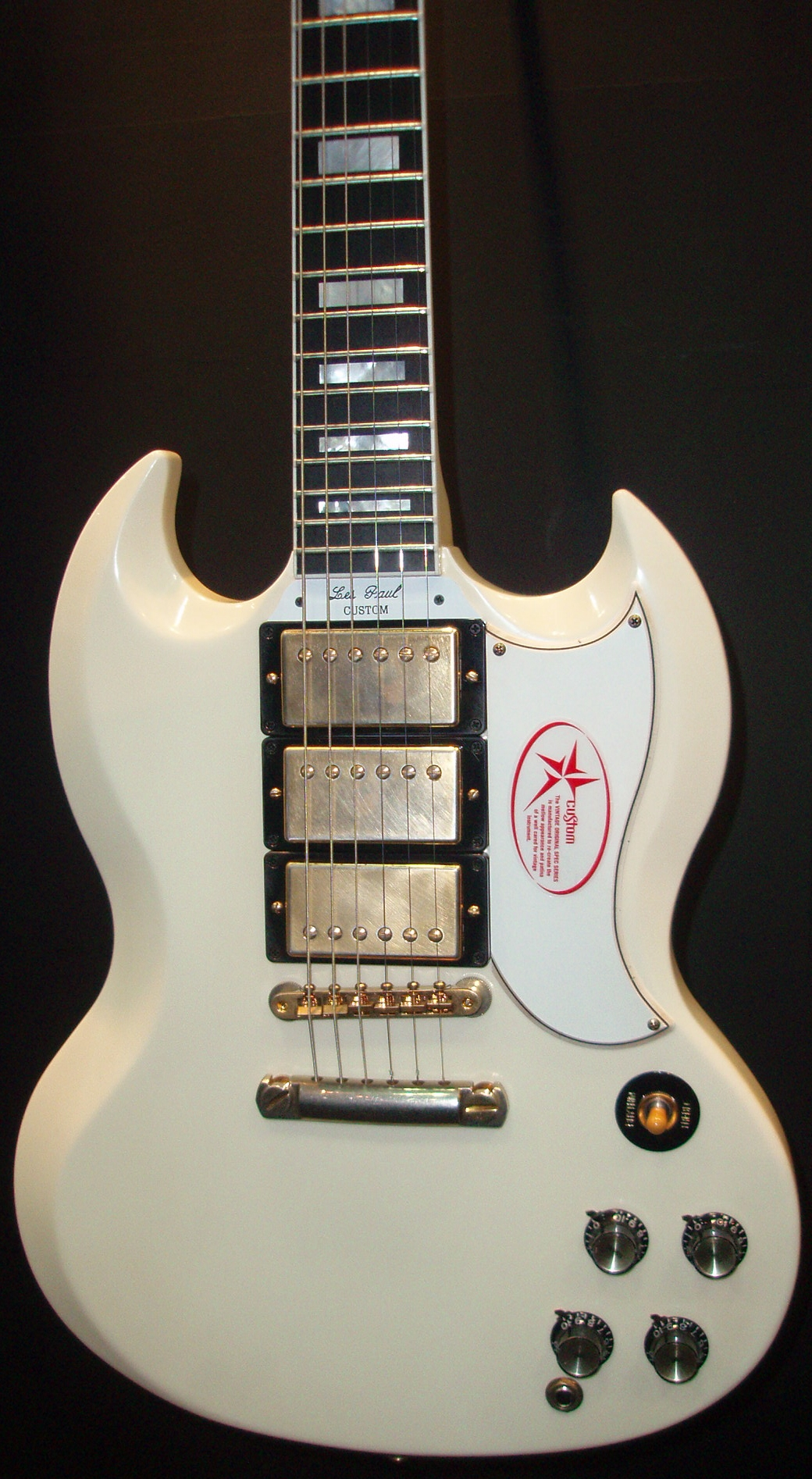
3 PAF reissues on a Les Paul/SG Custom

Pickup manufacturer Seymour Duncan described the characteristic tone of P.A.F.s as a "Tele-on-steroids," with a "full, uncompressed sound that’s slightly less bright than a single-coil" and "a nice balance of warm lows, clear mids and crisp highs." Additionally, the pickups had a tonal clarity and touch sensitivity at higher gain levels that helped make them popular among rock and blues musicians.

However, due to manufacturing inconsistencies, each individual pickup is unique in terms of output level and tone. Factors that account for this variation are:

- Gibson used four different machines to wind vintage P.A.F. pickups. Two of the four machines lacked auto stop mechanisms resulting in variation in turns for each of the bobbins that make up the P.A.F. pickup assembly. The resulting inconsistency in turn count led to variation in the output and tone. For the same reason, the two coils within each pickup unit usually have a slightly different number of turns, which affects the treble overtones of the assembled pickup.
- Gibson used Alnico magnets in P.A.F.s, the same magnet as used in the P-90. Alnico has several different grades with different tonal properties. In original P.A.F. pickups the grades Alnico 2, 3, and 5 were used (with Alnico 3 being the least common).
- Original P.A.F. magnets were charged in groups. This process yielded magnets that were not fully charged to saturation. Vintage P.A.F. and P-90 magnets therefore can lose some charge over time, which affects the tone of the pickup. (P-90's in particular are more prone to this effect.)

== Legacy ==
In an article exploring how P.A.F.s had become the "most revered and elusive" pickup ever made, Guitarist dubbed them the "Holy Grail of all electric guitar pickups" and noted a cottage industry had formed around companies trying to replicate the vintage P.A.F. design, with much of the pickup's status owing to its popularity with influential guitarists like Eric Clapton, Jeff Beck, Duane Allman, George Harrison, and Sister Rosetta Tharpe.

Despite the popularity of hotter humbuckers in the 1970s, by 1981 Gibson realized that there was still a consumer demand for the sound of original P.A.F. pickups. Engineer Tim Shaw designed a pickup that aimed to replicate the early design, reversing changes made in the 1960s and 1970s. Shaw's efforts are generally considered to be the first of many recreations of the P.A.F. humbucker, and it was used in Gibson's reissue and Custom Shop models through the '80s and '90s. Inspired by Shaw's efforts, pickup manufacturer Seymour Duncan partnered with Seth Lover to design the "Seth Lover Humbucker," a faithful recreation of the original P.A.F. design using one of Gibson's old coil-winding machines.

The P.A.F.'s sound has remained popular—even as newer humbuckers have become the norm—with notable fans in Dave Grohl, Derek Trucks, and Jeff Tweedy. Many companies have also released modernized versions of the design, with Gibson offering models like the "Burstbucker" and "Custom Buckers."
