= Delay (audio effect) =

Echo-like effect

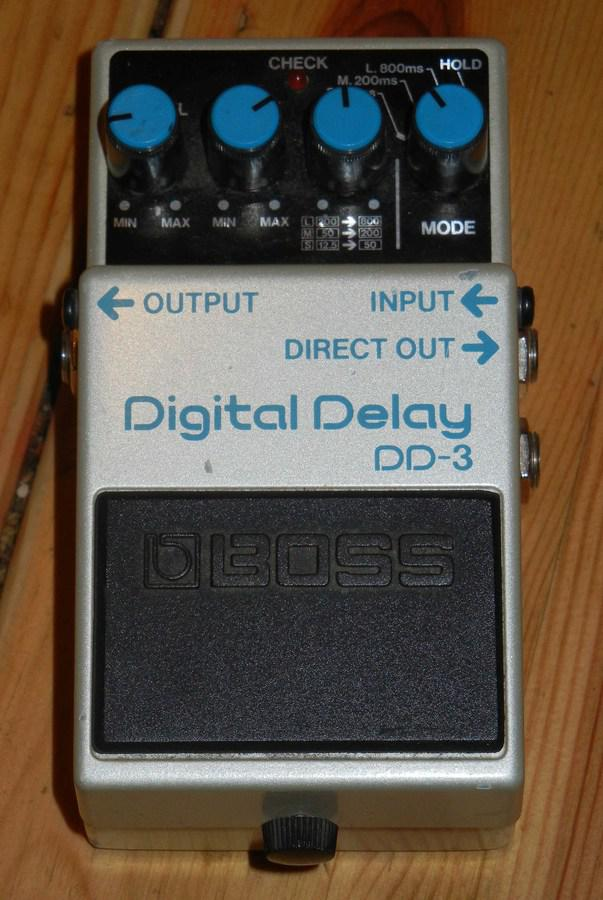
A Boss digital delay pedal

Delay is an audio signal processing technique that records an input signal to a storage medium and then plays it back after a period of time. When the delayed playback is mixed with the live audio, it creates an echo-like effect, whereby the original audio is heard followed by the delayed audio. The delayed signal may be played back multiple times, or fed back into the recording, to create the sound of a repeating, decaying echo.

Delay effects range from a subtle echo effect to a pronounced blending of previous sounds with new sounds. Delay effects can be created using tape loops, an approach developed in the 1940s and 1950s and used by artists including Elvis Presley and Buddy Holly.

Analog effects units were introduced in the 1970s, digital effects pedals in 1984, and audio plug-in software in the 2000s.

== History ==
The first delay effects were achieved using tape loops improvised on reel-to-reel audio tape recording systems. By shortening or lengthening the loop of tape and adjusting the read-and-write heads, the nature of the delayed echo could be controlled. This technique was most common among early composers of musique concrète such as Pierre Schaeffer, and composers such as Karlheinz Stockhausen, who had sometimes devised elaborate systems involving long tapes and multiple recorders and playback systems, collectively processing the input of a live performer or ensemble.

American producer Sam Phillips created a slapback echo effect with two Ampex 350 tape recorders in 1954. The effect was used by artists including Elvis Presley (such as on his track "Blue Moon of Kentucky") and Buddy Holly, and became one of Phillips' signatures. Guitarist and instrument designer Les Paul was an early pioneer in delay devices. According to Sound on Sound, "The character and depth of sound that was produced from tape echo on these old records is extremely lush, warm and wide."

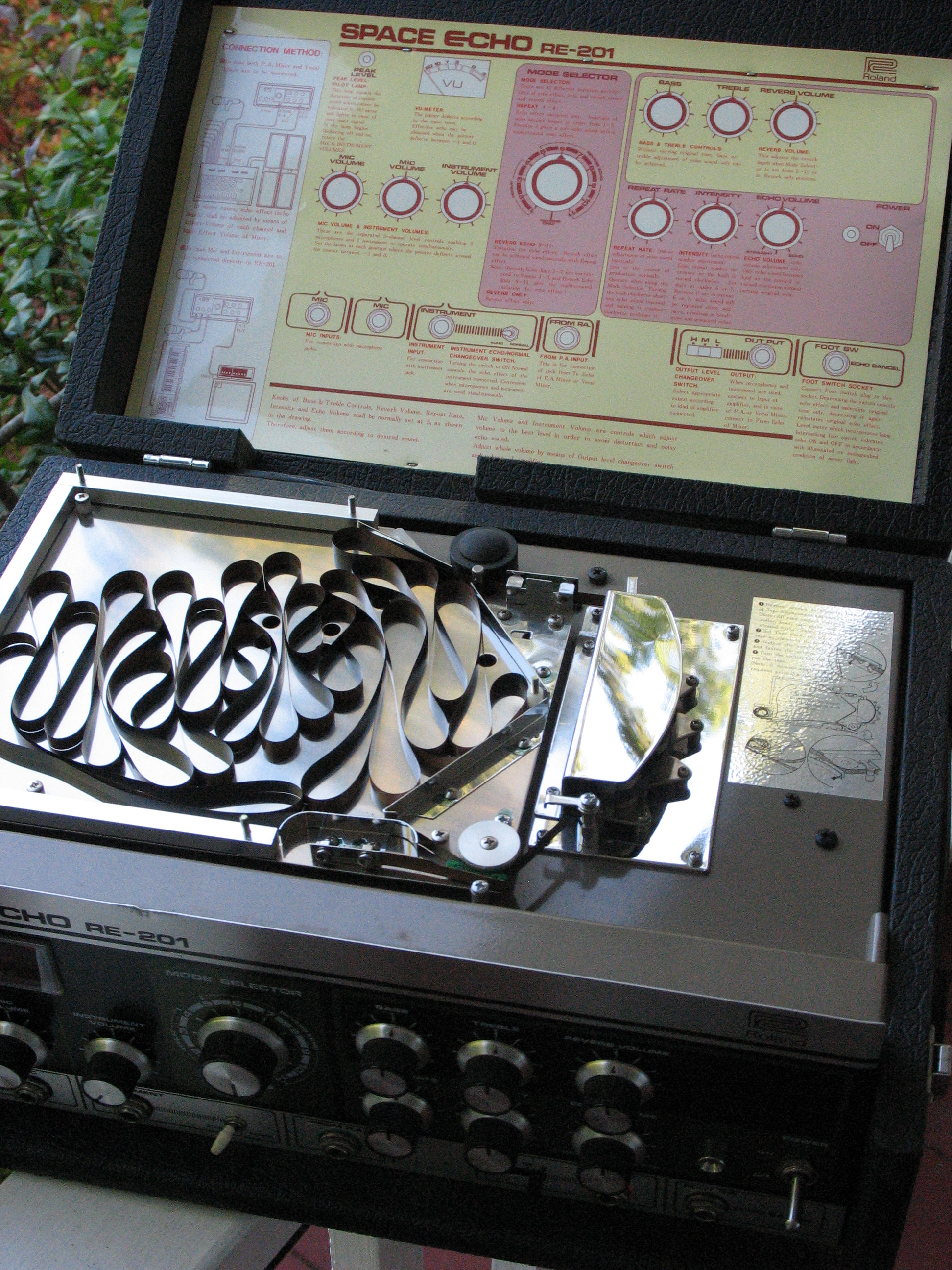
The tape mechanism of a Roland RE-201 delay unit

Tape echoes became commercially available in the 1950s. Tape echo machines contain loops of tape that pass over a record head and then a playback head. An echo machine is the early name for a sound processing device used with electronic instruments to repeat the sound and produce a simulated echo. The time between echo repeats was adjusted by varying head position or tape speed. The length or intensity of the echo effect was adjusted by changing the amount of echo signal fed back into the signal recorded to tape.

A landmark device was the EchoSonic made by American Ray Butts. It is a portable guitar amplifier with a built-in tape echo, which became used widely in country music (Chet Atkins) and especially in rock and roll (Scotty Moore).

Dedicated machines for creating tape loops were introduced. One example is the Echoplex, which uses a tape loop. The length of delay is adjusted by changing the distance between the tape record and playback heads. Another is the Ace Tone EC-1 Echo Chamber.

With the Roland RE-201, introduced in 1973, Japanese engineer Ikutaro Kakehashi refined the tape delay to make it more reliable and robust, with reduced tape wear and noise, wow, and flutter, additional controls, and additional tape heads. Different effects could be created by enabling different combinations of playback heads. By adjusting the controls and tape speed, musicians could create pitch-shifting and oscillating effects. The RE-201 was used by acts including Brian Setzer, Bob Marley, Portishead, and Radiohead.

In the 1970s, Jamaican dub reggae producers used delay effects extensively; Lee "Scratch" Perry created "lo-fi sci-fi" effects by using delay and reverb on a mixing console test tone and dub techno producers such as Basic Channel introduced delay to electronic music. Digital delay effects were developed with the arrival of digital recording.

== Analog delay ==
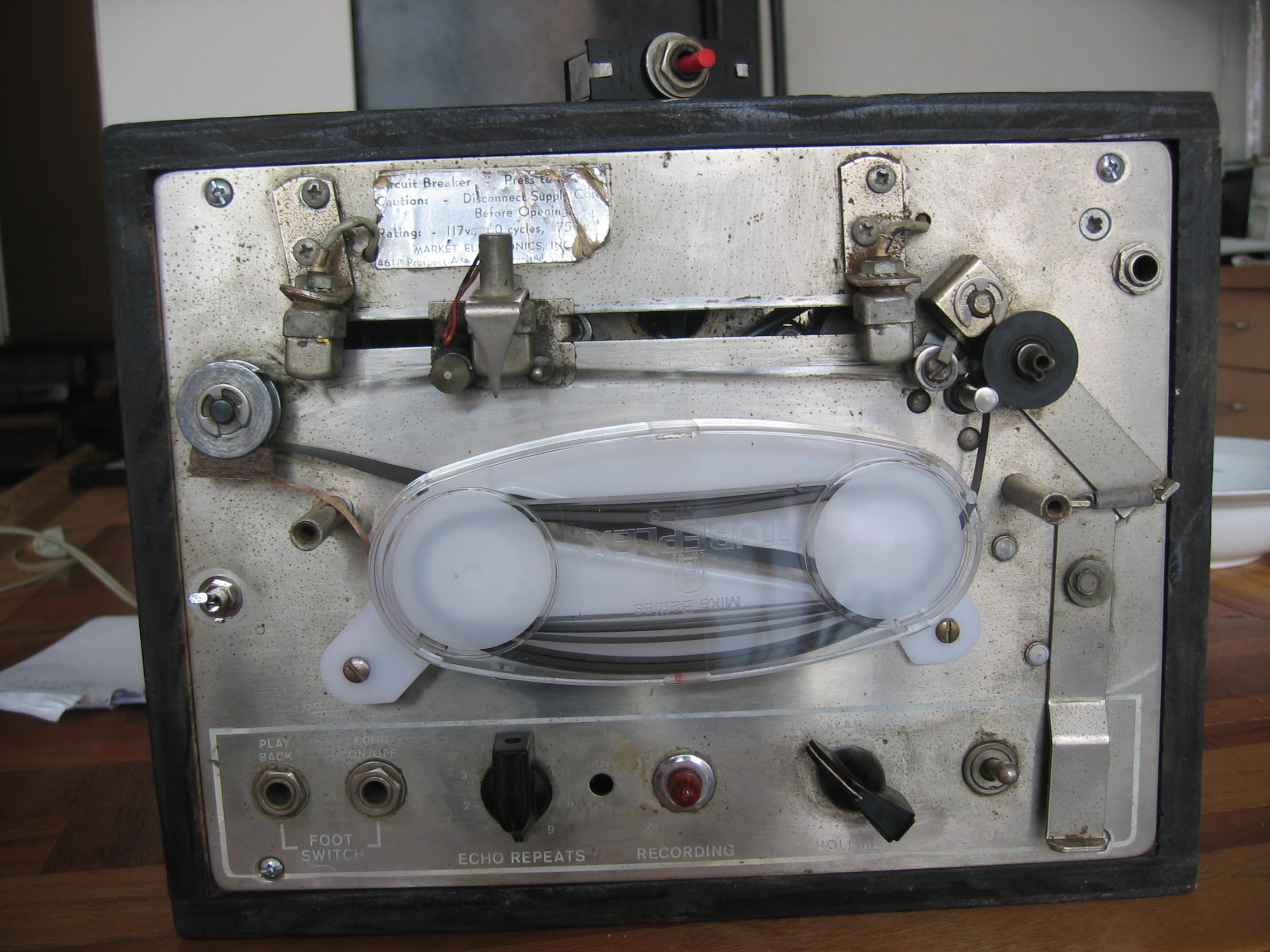
Echoplex EP-2

Before the invention of audio delay technology, music employing an echo had to be recorded in a naturally reverberant space, often an inconvenience for musicians and engineers. The demand for an easy-to-use real-time echo effect led to the production of systems offering an all-in-one effects unit that could be adjusted to produce echoes of any interval or amplitude. The presence of multiple taps (playback heads) made it possible to have delays at varying rhythmic intervals; this allowed musicians an additional means of expression over natural periodic echoes.

=== Tape delay ===
Early experiments such as send tape echo echo delay (STEED) at Abbey Road Studios used standard and modified reel-to-reel tape recorders to produce delay.

Delay effect (1)
A short spoken passage, followed by the same passage processed using various delays

Delay processors based on analog tape recording use magnetic tape as their recording and playback medium. Electric motors guide a tape loop through a device with a variety of mechanisms allowing modification of the effect's parameters. Popular models include Ray Butts' EchoSonic (1952), the Watkins Copicat (1958), the Echoplex (1959) and the Roland Space Echo (1974).

In the Echoplex EP-2, the play head position was fixed, while a combination record and erase head was mounted on a slide, thus the delay time of the echo was adjusted by changing the distance between the record and play heads.

The Space Echo uses a free-running tape transport system to reduce tape wear, noise, and wow and flutter, and made the units more reliable and easy to transport. It was more reliable and sturdy than previous tape echo devices, making it easy to travel and perform with. It has been used by musicians in genres such as reggae, dub, trip hop, post-punk and experimental rock.

Thin magnetic tape was not entirely suited for continuous operation, however, so the tape loop has to be replaced from time to time to maintain the audio fidelity of the processed sounds. The Binson Echorec used a rotating magnetic drum or disc (not entirely unlike those used in modern hard-disk drives) as its storage medium. This provided an advantage over tape, as the durable drums were able to last for many years with little deterioration in the audio quality. In later years, tape delay effects remained popular for the way the tape compresses and distorts, "creating the impression that the echoes are receding rather than just getting quieter".

=== Oil can ===
An alternative echo system was the so-called oil-can delay method, which uses electrostatic rather than electromagnetic recording.

Invented by Ray Lubow, the oil-can method uses a rotating disc of anodized aluminium coated with a suspension of carbon particles. An AC signal to a conductive neoprene wiper transfers the charge to the high impedance disc. As the particles pass by the wiper, they act as thousands of tiny capacitors, holding a small part of the charge. A second wiper reads this representation of the signal and sends it to a voltage amplifier that mixes it with the original source. To protect the charge held by the particles and to lubricate the entire assembly, the disc runs inside a sealed can with enough of a special insulating oil (Note: Union Carbide UCON lb65) to assure that an even coating is applied as it spins.

The effect resembles an echo, but the whimsical nature of the storage medium causes variations in the sound that can be heard as a vibrato effect. Some early models featured control circuitry designed to feed the output of the read wiper to the write wiper, causing a reverberant effect as well.

Many different companies marketed these devices under various names. Fender sold the Dimension IV, the Variable Delay, the Echo-Reverb I, II, and III, and included an oil can in their Special Effects box. Gibson sold the GA-4RE from 1965 to 1967. Ray Lubow himself sold many different versions under the Tel-Ray/Morley brand, starting out in the early sixties with the Ad-n-echo, and eventually producing the Echo-ver-brato, the Electrostatic Delay Line, and many others into the eighties.

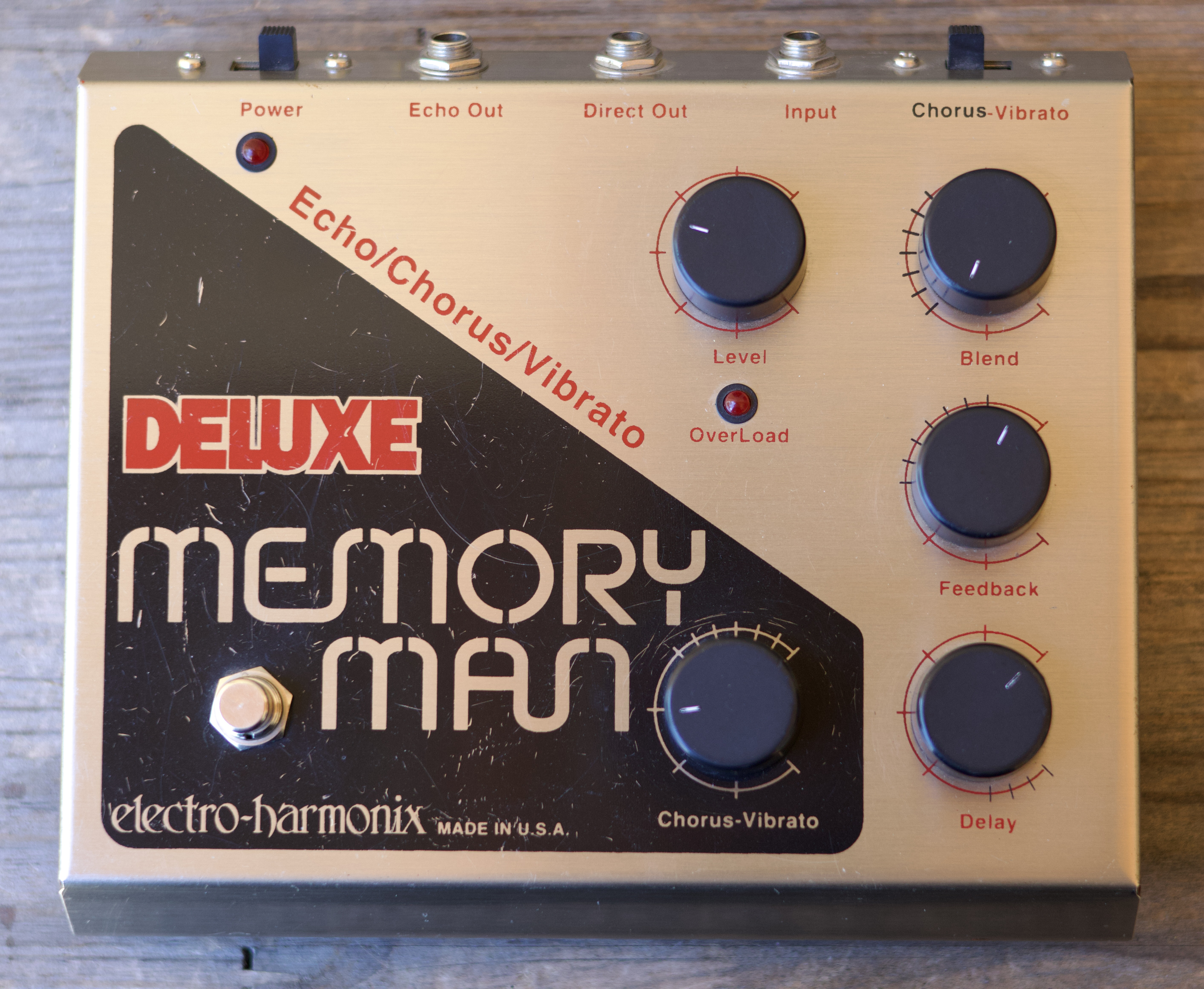
Deluxe Memory Man

=== Solid-state delay ===
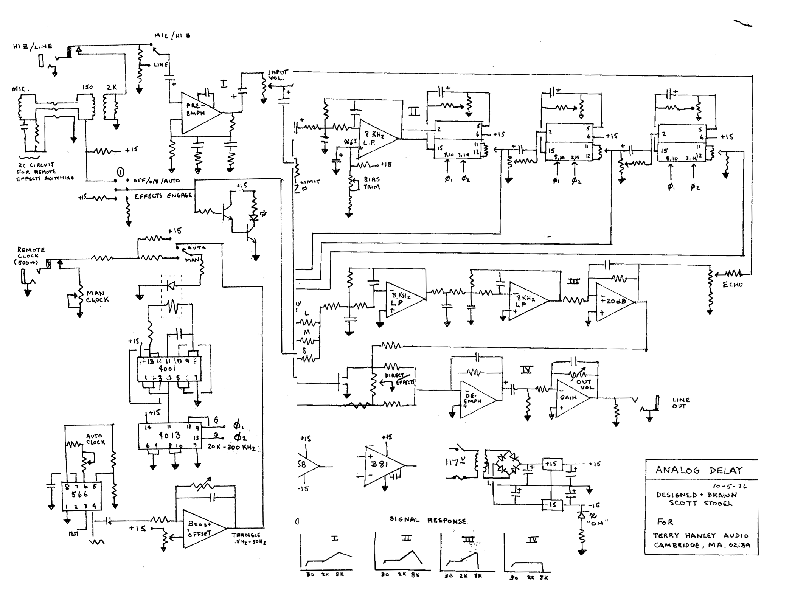
1976 analog solid-state delay schematic

The bucket-brigade device (BBD) was developed at Philips in 1969. Delay effects utilizing this technology eventually became available. Notable examples include the Memory Man from Electro-Harmonix, released in 1976, and the Boss DM-2 released in 1981. BBD-based devices offered a convenient alternative to tape delays and leslie speakers but were eventually largely supplanted by digital delays.

== Digital delay ==
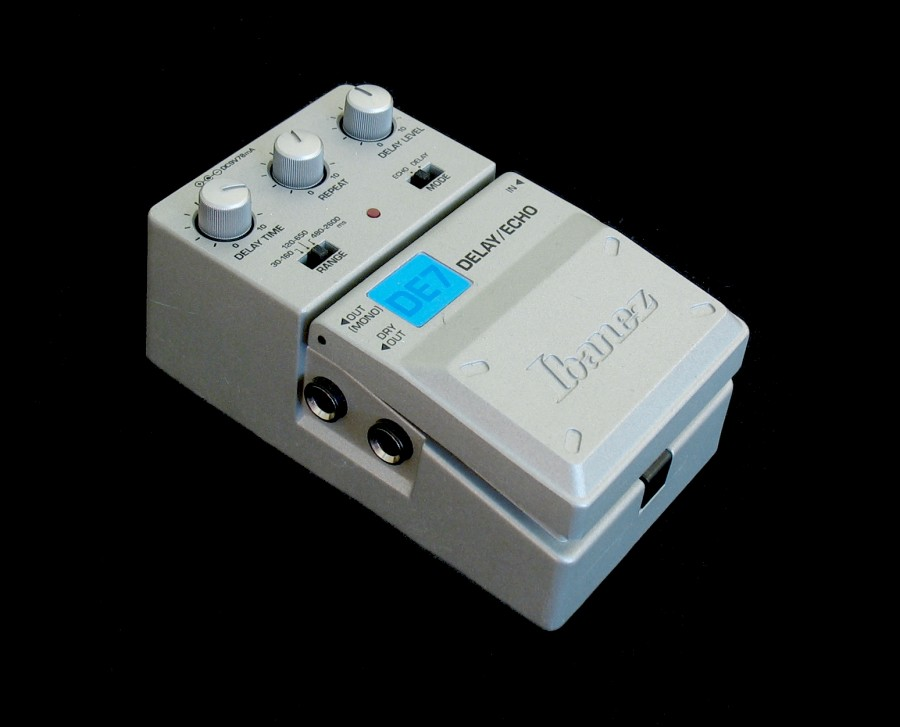
An Ibanez DE-7 delay pedal

Sound example of a plugin simulation of an analog delay (EHX Memory Man) with modulation and pitch shift

Digital delay systems function by sampling the input signal using an analog-to-digital converter. The resulting digital audio is passed through a memory buffer and recalled from the buffer a short time later. Through feedback of some of the delayed audio back into the buffer, multiple repeats of the audio are created. (Note: High levels of feedback can cause the level of the output to rapidly increase (self-oscillation), becoming louder and louder; this may be managed with limiters.) The delayed (wet) output may be mixed with the unmodified (dry) signal after, or before, it is sent to a digital-to-analog converter for output.

Digital delay effects were initially available as expensive rack-mounted units intended for use in television and audio production studios. One of the first was the Eventide DDL 1745 from 1971. Another popular rack-mount digital delay was the AMS DMX 15-80 of 1978. As digital memory became cheaper in the 1980s, units like Lexicon PCM42, Roland SDE-3000, TC Electronic 2290 offered more than three seconds of delay time, enough to create background loops, rhythms, and phrases. The 2290 was upgradeable to 32 seconds, and Electro-Harmonix offered a 16-second delay and looping machine. Eventually, as costs came down further and the electronics grew smaller, they became available in the form of foot pedals. The first digital delay offered in a pedal was the Boss DD-2 in 1984. Rack-mounted delay units evolved into digital reverb units and on to digital multi-effects units capable of more sophisticated effects than pure delay, such as reverb and audio time stretching and pitch scaling effects.

Digital delays present an extensive array of options, including control over the time before playback of the delayed signal. Most also allow the user to select the overall level of the processed signal in relation to the unmodified one, or the level at which the delayed signal is fed back into the memory, to be repeated again. Some systems allow more exotic controls, such as the ability to add an audio filter and modulate the playback rate.

== Looping ==
Gibson Echoplex Digital Pro

While the early delay units with a long delay capacity could be used to record a riff or chord progression and then play over it, they were challenging to work with. The Paradis Loop Delay, created in 1992, was the first unit with dedicated looping functions such as record, overdub, multiply, insert, and replace, which made it more intuitive and user-friendly. Gibson manufactured a slightly improved version as the Echoplex Digital Pro until 2006.

== Computer software ==
Sound example of a plugin simulation of an analog delay (EHX Memory Man) with modulation and pitch shift on Amplitube 4

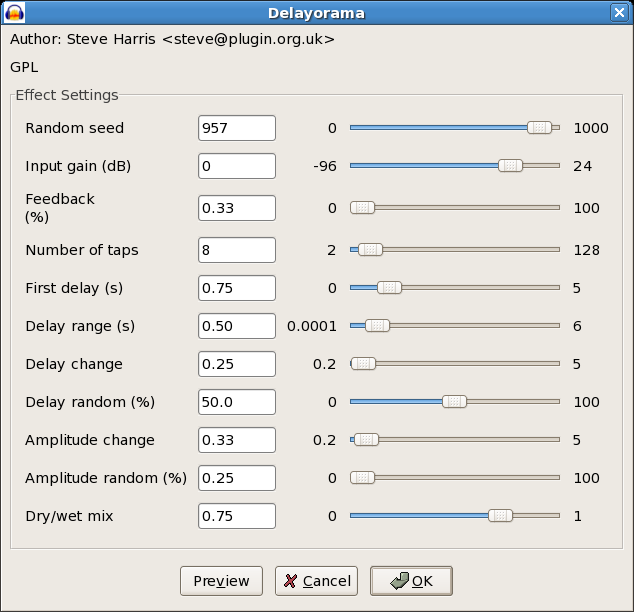
Steve Harris' Delayorama software

A natural development from digital delay-processing hardware was the appearance of software-based delay systems. In large part, this coincided with the popularity of audio editing software. Software delays, in many cases, offer much greater flexibility than even the most recent digital hardware delays. Software implementations may offer shifting or random delay times, or the insertion of other audio effects in the feedback path. Many software plugins have added functionality to emulate the sounds of the earlier analog units. Abundant main memory on modern personal computers offers ample delay time.

== Artistic uses ==
In popular and electronic music, electric guitarists use delay to produce densely overlaid textures of notes with rhythms complementary to the music. U2 guitarist the Edge uses delay while he plays arpeggios on electric guitar, thus creating a sustained, synth pad-like background. Vocalists and instrumentalists use delay to add a dense or ethereal quality to their singing or playing. Extremely long delays of 10 seconds or more are often used to create loops of a whole musical phrase. Robert Fripp used two Revox reel-to-reel tape recorders to achieve very long delay times for solo guitar performance. He dubbed this technology "Frippertronics", and used it in a number of recordings.

John Martyn was a pioneer of the Echoplex. Perhaps the earliest indication of his use can be heard on the songs "Would You Believe Me" and "The Ocean" on the album Stormbringer! released in February 1970.

== Function ==
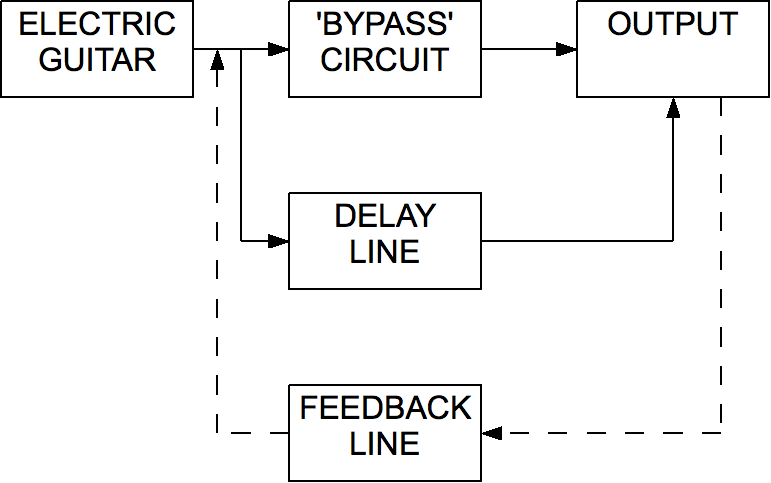
Block diagram of the signal-flow for a typical simple delay-line, tied to an electric guitar. Dotted line indicates options component.

Delay effects add a time delay to an audio signal. Blending the delayed audio with the original audio creates an echo-like effect, whereby the original audio is heard, followed by the delayed audio. The delayed signal may be treated separately from the input audio - for example, with an equalizer.

Most delay effects allow users to set the delay time, or the amount of time between each audio playback. They may be synchronized to a BPM, allowing users to set time values as beat divisions. Delay is used to create other effects, including reverb, chorus, and flanging.

Delay effects typically allow users to add and adjust feedback. By feeding some of the delayed audio back into the delay mechanism, multiple repeats of the audio are heard. At low feedback settings, each repeat fades in volume. High levels of feedback can cause the level of the output to rapidly increase, becoming louder and louder; this may be managed using a limiter.

=== Haas effect ===
Short delays (50 ms or less) create a sense of broadening the sound without creating a perceptible echo and can be used to add stereo width or simulate double-tracking (layering two performances). The effect is known as the precedence effect or Haas effect, after the German scientist Helmut Haas.

=== Ping-pong delay ===
In a ping-pong delay, the delayed signal alternates between the two channels of a stereo program.

=== Multi-tap ===
Delay effect (2)
A short passage on flute, before and after the application of a multi-tap, multi-channel delay

In a multi-tap delay, multiple taps (outputs) are taken from a delay buffer, each with independent times and levels, and summed with the original signal. Multi-tap delays can be used to create rhythmic patterns or dense, reverb-like effects.

=== Doubling echo ===
Doubling echo is produced by adding a short delay to a recorded sound. Delays of thirty to fifty milliseconds are the most common; longer delay times become slapback echo. Mixing the original and delayed sounds creates an effect similar to doubletracking, or unison performance.

=== Slapback echo ===
Slapback echo uses a delay time of 60 to 250 milliseconds with little or no feedback. (Note: Increasing the feedback of a slapback effect can create a sound similar to a spring reverb effect.) A slapback delay creates a thickening effect. The effect is characteristic of vocals on 1950s rock-and-roll records. In July 1954, Sam Phillips produced the first of five 78s and 45s that Elvis Presley would release on Sun Records over the next year and a half, all of which featured a novel production technique that Phillips termed slapback echo. The effect was produced by re-feeding the output signal from the playback head tape recorder to its record head. The physical space between heads, the speed of the tape, and the chosen volume being the main controlling factors. Analog and later digital delay machines also easily produced the effect. It is also sometimes used on instruments, particularly drums and percussion.

=== Flanging, chorus effect, and reverb ===
Flanging, chorus and reverb are all delay-based sound effects. With flanging and chorus, the delay time is very short and usually modulated. With reverberation, there are multiple delays and feedback so that individual echoes are blurred together, recreating the sound of an acoustic space.

=== Straight delay ===
Straight delay is used in sound reinforcement systems to compensate for the propagation of sound through the air. Unlike audio delay effects devices, straight delay is not mixed back in with the original signal. The delayed signal alone is sent to loudspeakers so that the speakers distant from the stage will reinforce the stage sound at the same time or slightly later than the acoustic sound from the stage. The delayed signal uses approximately 1 millisecond of straight delay per foot of air or 3 milliseconds per meter. (Note: Depending on the air temperature's effect on the speed of sound. At an air temperature of 20 °C (68 °F), one meter of sound travel takes 2.92 milliseconds, and one foot of sound travel takes 0.888 ms.) Because of the Haas effect, this technique allows audio engineers to use additional speaker systems placed away from the stage and still give the illusion that all sound originates from the stage. The purpose is to deliver sufficient sound volume to the back of the venue without resorting to excessive sound volumes near the front.

Straight delay is also used in audio to video synchronization to align sound with visual media (e.g., on TV or web broadcasting), if the visual source is delayed. Visual media can become delayed by a number of mechanisms or reasons, such as time base correction, video scaling and framebuffers, in which case the associated audio may be delayed to match the visual content.

== See also ==
- Analog delay line
- Broadcast delay – Practice of intentionally delaying a live broadcast
- Digital delay line
