= Echoplex =

Tape delay effect machine

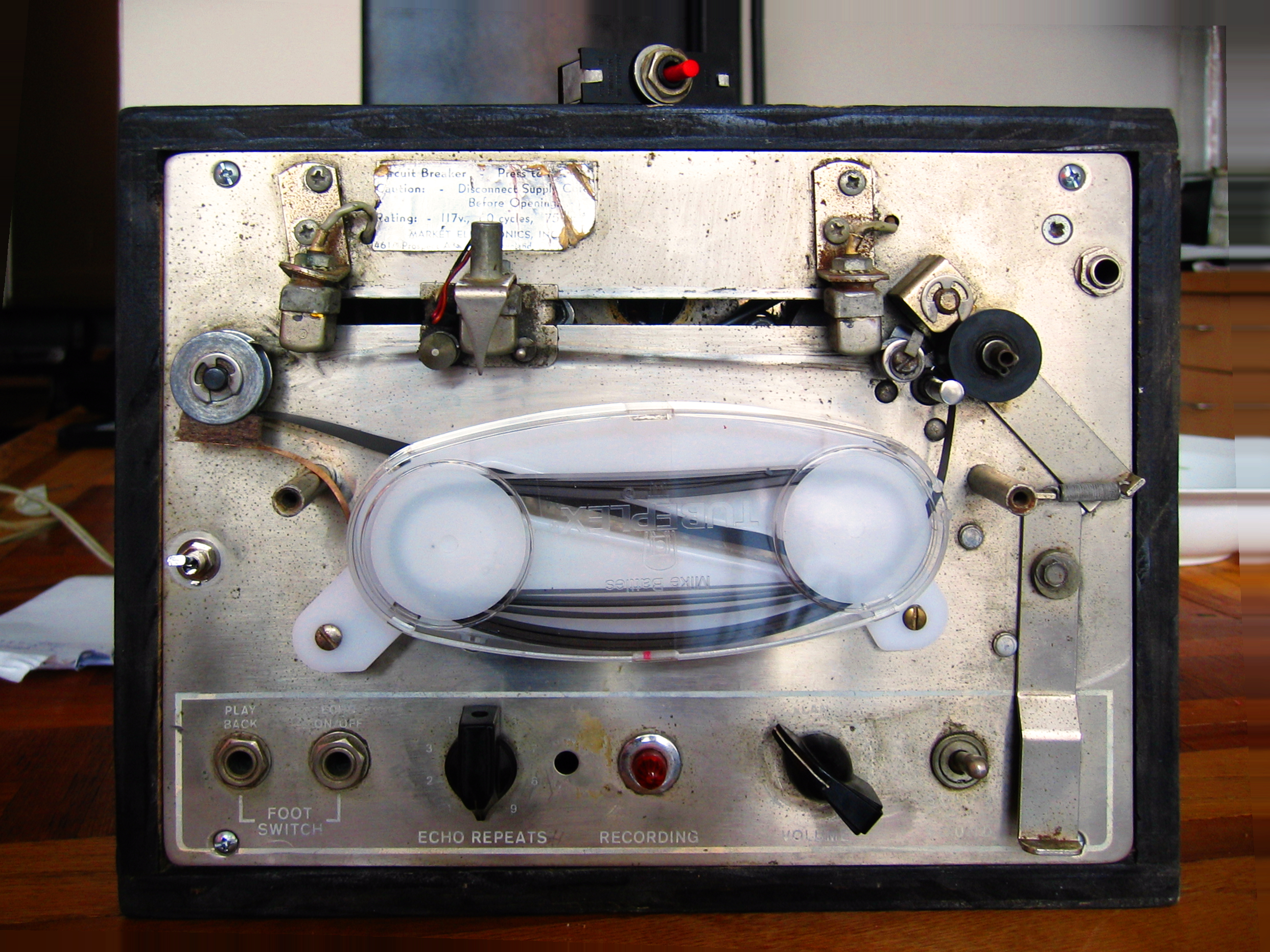
Echoplex EP-2

The Echoplex is a tape delay effects unit, first made in 1959. Designed by engineer Mike Battle, the Echoplex set a standard for the effect in the 1960s; according to Michael Dregni, it is still regarded as "the standard by which everything else is measured." The Echoplex was widely used in the 1960s and 1970s, mainly by guitarists but also by other performers, and original Echoplexes are highly sought after.

== Background ==
Tape echoes work by recording sound on a magnetic tape, which is then played back; the tape speed and distance between the recording and playback heads determine the delay time, while a feedback variable (where the delayed sound is fed back into the input) allows for multiple echoes. The predecessor of the Echoplex was a tape echo designed by Ray Butts in the 1950s, who built it into a guitar amplifier called the EchoSonic. Butts built fewer than seventy EchoSonics for guitarists including Chet Atkins, Scotty Moore, and Carl Perkins. Mike Battle later copied Butts' tape echo and built it into a portable unit; another version of the story holds that Battle based his design on one by Don Dixon.

== Tube Echoplexes ==
According to Battle, "We sold the first 500 units to C.M.I. in Chicago in 1959. The Echoplex was sold through Chicago Musical Instruments, CMI." The main innovation of the Echoplex was a moving record head, which allowed for variable delay time without changing the tape speed. In 1962, their patent was bought by Market Electronics of Cleveland, Ohio. Market Electronics built the units and kept designers Battle and Dixon as consultants; they marketed the units through distributor Maestro. In the 1950s, Maestro was a leader in vacuum tube technology. It had close ties with Gibson, and often manufactured amplifiers for Gibson. Later, Harris-Teller of Chicago took over production.

The first tube Echoplex units had no numerical designation, but this model was retroactively designated the EP-1 after the first revision was dubbed the EP-2. These two units were noted for their "warm, round, thick echo" and the sound quality of the tube preamplifier section. Two of Battle's improvements over earlier designs were key: the adjustable tape head and a cartridge containing the tape, protecting it to retain sound quality.

While Echoplexes were used mainly by guitar players (and the occasional bass player, such as Chuck Rainey, or trumpeter, such as Don Ellis or Miles Davis), many recording studios also used them.

== Solid-state Echoplexes ==
=== EP-3 ===
Market Electronics held off on using transistors while other companies made the transition. Nevertheless, in the late 1960s they set Battle and Dixon to the task of creating the first transistorized Echoplexes. Once the two were satisfied, the solid-state Echoplex was offered by Maestro beginning in 1970 and designated the EP-3; Battle, unhappy with the sound of the EP-3, sold his interest in the company. The EP-3 offered a sound-on-sound mode and a number of minor improvements. The EP-3 enjoyed the longest production run of all the Echoplex models, being manufactured until 1991. Around the time of the public introduction of the EP-3, Maestro was taken over by Norlin Industries, then the parent company of Gibson.

=== EP-4 ===
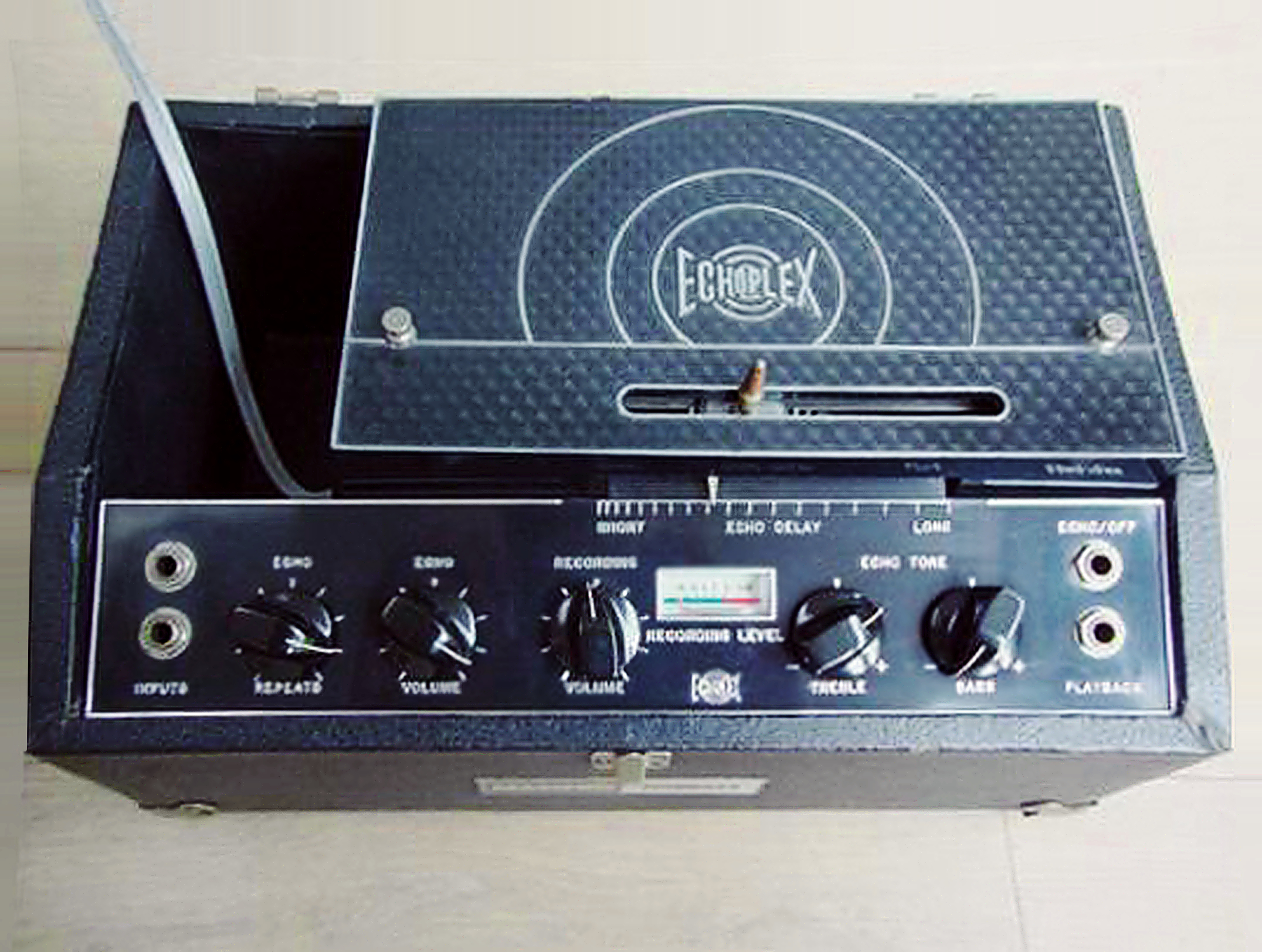
EP4

In the mid-1970s, Market created an upgrade to the EP-3, designated the EP-4, adding features such as an LED input meter, an output buffer, and tone controls, and dropping the sound-on-sound feature. A compressor board based on the CA3080 transconductance amplifier was added to the record circuit of both the EP-3 and EP-4 models for a short while after the EP-4 model was introduced, but later dropped from both.

Battle's final work with Market yielded the EM-1 Groupmaster, which offered a four-channel input mixer section and a mono output section. Dissatisfied with the direction Maestro was taking, Battle left the company.

== End of tape echo production and subsequent use of the brand ==
Gibson Echoplex Digital Pro

At the end of the 1970s, Norlin folded and their Maestro brand and Market Electronics was forced to find another distributor for their products. They found that distributor in Harris Teller, a Chicago musical wholesaler. Units built for Harris Teller carried an Echoplex badge that omitted the Maestro name. In 1984, Harris Teller bought out the Echoplex name and the remaining stock of Echoplex parts from Market Electronics. Harris Teller used the back stock to assemble reissues of the EP-3 and EP-4 as well as the EP-2, which was designated the EP-6t. In 1991, the thirty-year run of tape Echoplex production finally came to an end. The Echoplex brand was purchased by Gibson later that decade and applied to a line of digital looping delays, one of which was sold under the Oberheim brand as the Echoplex Digital Pro.

As of 2019, Echoplex is a trademark of Dunlop Manufacturing, which uses it for a digital delay pedal that emulates the sound of tape Echoplexes. Dunlop also manufactures a FET-based preamplifier pedal modeled on the EP-3's preamplifier.

== Notable users ==
- Duane Allman
- Chet Atkins
- Tommy Bolin, especially for the "ray-gun" effect heard on Billy Cobham's Spectrum
- Wes Borland
- Miles Davis
- East Bay Ray
- Don Ellis
- Jerry Goldsmith
- Steve Hackett
- Eric Johnson
- John Martyn
- Brian May
- Steve Miller
- Gary Moore
- Jimmy Page
- Lee "Scratch" Perry
- Jeff Plewman (Nash the Slash)
- Chuck Rainey
- Randy Rhoads
- Joe Satriani
- Neal Schon
- Sonny Sharrock
- Bruce Springsteen
- Andy Summers
- Eddie Van Halen
- Joe Walsh
- Keller Williams
- Neil Young
- Doug Martsch
- DJ Kool Herc

== See also ==
- Binson Echorec
- Watkins Copicat
