= Winifred Fairfax Warder =

American Red Cross worker

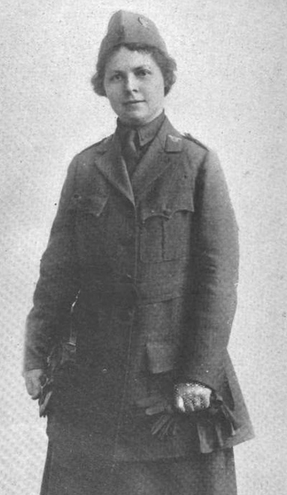
Winifred Fairfax Warder, from a 1921 publication.

Winifred Fairfax Warder (May 22, 1885 – October 8, 1918) was an American Red Cross worker during World War I.

== Early life ==
Winifred Fairfax Warder was born in Cairo, Illinois, the daughter of Walter Warder and Medora "Dora" Bain Warder. Her father was a judge and state legislator, and President of the Illinois Senate from 1899 to 1901. Winifred Warder was educated at the Bettie Stuart Institute, St. Agatha's Episcopal School, Cairo High School (graduated 1903), and Monticello Female Seminary (graduated 1906). She pursued further studies in Washington D. C., at the Hamilton School for Girls and at the Sherratt Art School. She was known in Washington society for her skill at painting china, and for her expertise in rose cultivation.

== Career ==
Warder was a clubwoman with a strong interest in the war effort during World War I. She was active in the Cairo Women's Club, organized and led the Navy League of Cairo, and organized a Red Cross chapter for the city as well. In 1917 she worked with the women's section of the Illinois State Council on Defense. She was also a member of the state committee of Illinois's Equal Suffrage Amendment Association, and a leader in the United States Daughters of 1812 for the state. She attended national conventions of the United States Daughters of 1812 and of the General Federation of Women's Clubs in 1916.

Warder was 31 years old when she began training at the First National Service Training Camp for Women in 1916. The following year she began preparing for overseas duty, to work in war camps and hospitals. In 1918 she joined the effort of the Women's Overseas Hospitals, as part of the Gas Motor Unit No. 1, to provide first aid in the trenches after a gas attack. However, on her way to France, she became ill, and died soon after arriving at Bordeaux, France, in a military hospital, aged 33 years, a casualty of the 1918 flu pandemic. Her death was included in official casualty counts reported by the army, with her position give as "cook". Gertrude Foster Brown, the Director General of Women's Overseas Hospitals, wrote a letter to Warder's parents, describing her last days, and her funeral service in Bordeaux. "Your daughter has given herself to her country just as much as if she had gone to the firing line, and I hope you will find some consolation in that thought. We have mourned her as if she were our own." Warder's remains were returned to Illinois for burial with full military honors.

== Legacy ==
The Cairo Women's Club placed a bronze tablet in tribute to Warder's sacrifice, at the Cairo public library, and planted a tree in her memory, along with other trees planted in memory of fallen soldiers from Cairo. The American Legion post in Cairo was named the Winifred Fairfax Warder Post. The Illinois Suffrage Amendment Alliance pledged a $2000 memorial gift in Warder's name to the Overseas Hospital Fund. Warder's alma mater, Monticello Seminary, also placed a bronze tablet in memory of her service.
