= TV Jones =

TV Jones is an American guitar pickup manufacturer founded in 1993 by luthier Thomas V. Jones in Whittier, California. Now based in Poulsbo, Washington, the company is best known for creating vintage-style Filter'Tron pickups, using materials and a manufacturing process similar to what was used in the late 1950s and 1960s by Ray Butts and Gretsch.

== History ==
Prior to the focus on guitar pickups, TV Jones was mainly in the business of guitar repairs and custom guitar-making. In the early 1990s, his interest turned to electronics and Jones began to examine pickups and the magnets used in various vintage models. Around this time, he was asked to repair a number of guitars for Stray Cats guitarist Brian Setzer, whose guitar sound relied heavily on vintage Gretsch models. When Gretsch was in the process of creating his new signature model, Setzer conducted a "blind" sound test of various pickup models that were to be considered for use in these guitars. Jones' "Hotrod" pickup design was chosen because of its sound being the most faithful to the original Filter'Tron.

TV Jones' pickups subsequently became popular among many guitarists, particularly Gretsch aficionados, as word spread that TV Jones was making vintage-spec Filter'Tron pickups, most notably their TV Classics model. The company expanded its product line with further 'Tron-branded pickups, like the Magna'Tron, Power'Tron, Super'Tron, and Thunder'Tron models.

== Guitar models ==
In 2008, TV Jones released the Spectra Sonic Supreme guitar—an upgrade to the Spectra Sonic manufactured and distributed by Gretsch until 2005—and the smaller, lighter, solid-body Model 10. Both were designed by TV Jones and manufactured in Japan at the factory where most professional line Gretsch guitars are made.
