= Gretsch 6120 =

Electric guitar made by Gretsch Guitars

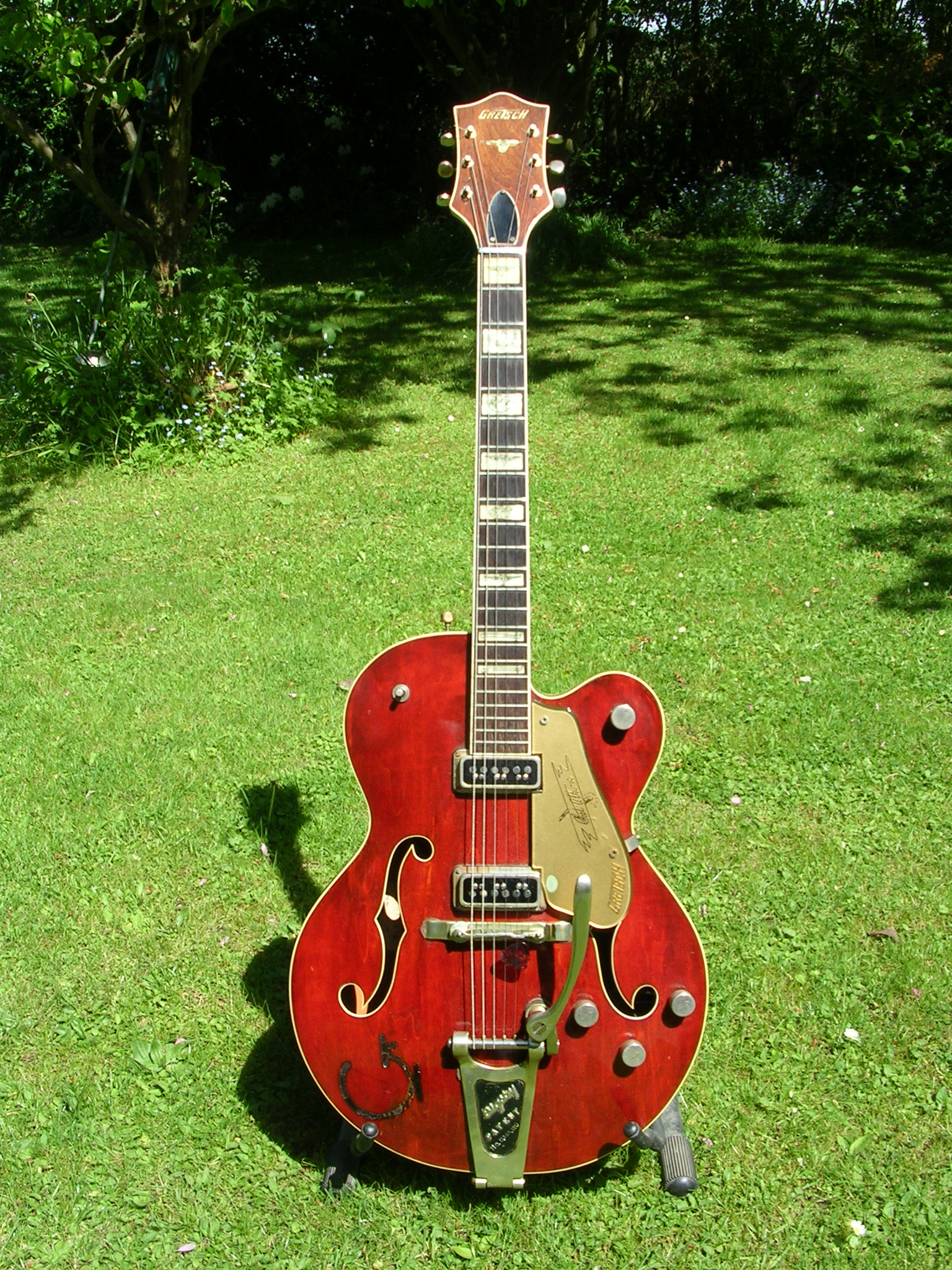
- Manufacturer: Gretsch
- Period: 1955–present

Construction
- Body type: Hollow
- Neck joint: Set

Woods
- Body: Maple laminate
- Neck: Maple
- Fretboard: Rosewood

Hardware
- Bridge: Tune-O-Matic bridge with rosewood base or Bigsby cast aluminum bridge
- Pickup: two Dynasonics (single coils) or Filtertrons (humbuckers)

Colors available
- Antique Natural, Vintage Sunburst, Wine Red, Tangerine, Lime Gold, Purple, Black, Emerald

The Gretsch 6120 is a hollow body electric guitar with f-holes, manufactured by Gretsch and first appearing in the mid-1950s with the endorsement of Chet Atkins. It was quickly adopted by rockabilly artists Eddie Cochran and Duane Eddy, and later by Eric Clapton, Neil Young, Randy Bachman, Brian Setzer, Reverend Horton Heat, and many others.

Pete Townshend received one as a gift from Joe Walsh in 1970, which he would use while recording Who's Next and Quadrophenia. Poison Ivy Rorschach of The Cramps notably played a 1958 Gretsch 6120, which she bought in 1985. She said it was her favourite guitar to play. The 6120 has been Manu Chao's preferred electric guitar to play live since 2002.

== Production history ==
The 6120 was the first in the line of "Chet Atkins" signature Gretsch Guitars. The prototype for the 6120 was first presented to Atkins in 1954 and was labeled as a Streamliner Special, with the serial number 13753. A second prototype was made, adding a vibrato tailpiece and a metal nut. Both prototypes had an unbound headstock, which did not carry over to the production models when the 6120 debuted in 1955.

Originally priced at $385, the 6120 was quite expensive compared to models from other companies, such as Gibson's Les Paul Goldtop, which retailed at $225, or Fender's Telecaster at $189.50.

In 1958, the thumbnail "neoclassic" fret markers were introduced. The DeArmond pickups were discontinued, with Gretsch using their own Filter'Tron humbuckers.

After George Harrison played Gretsch Country Gentleman and Tennessean models (which, like the 6120, were developed with and endorsed by Chet Atkins, one of Harrison's influences), Gretsch found that they could scarcely keep up with demand.

Due to changes in musical tastes and in Gretsch company ownership in the late 1960s resulting in deteriorating quality, production of the 6120 ceased in the late 1970s. Values of the existing instruments soared when rockabilly artist Brian Setzer of the Stray Cats was seen playing an old 6120 in his band's early 1980s music videos. Gretsch subsequently went back into the guitar business and new 6120 guitars are now widely available.

Today, the range of available 6120 guitars include an assortment of Brian Setzer signature models and faithful reissues of 1950s classics. The 6120 and other Pro-Line (Professional) Gretsch guitars are produced in Japan at the Terada factory, although American-made custom shop 6120s are also available.

== Variants ==
In the mid-1960s, the guitar's proper name changed from "6120 Chet Atkins Hollow Body" to "6120 Nashville". The original name is again in use, although Setzer signature models are sold as the "Brian Setzer Signature Nashville" and the "Brian Setzer Signature Hot Rod". The Players Edition Nashville (designated G6620T) is a double-cutaway variant with a center block of chambered spruce for added resonance.

=== Brian Setzer Collection ===
- G6120-SSLVO and G6120-SSU (1993-2003) - original signature models, now out of production
- G6120TFM-BSNV — Brian Setzer Signature Nashville - in flame maple / orange stain
- G6120T-BSNSH Brian Setzer Signature Nashville - black lacquer (Most -SSLVO, -SSU, -BSNV and -BSNSH models came with white dice control knobs)
- G6120T-BSSMK Brian Setzer Signature Nashville '59 - smoke orange
- G6120T-HR Brian Setzer Signature Hot Rod (with dual TV Jones "Hot Rod" Filter'Tron pickups) - available in five finish colors

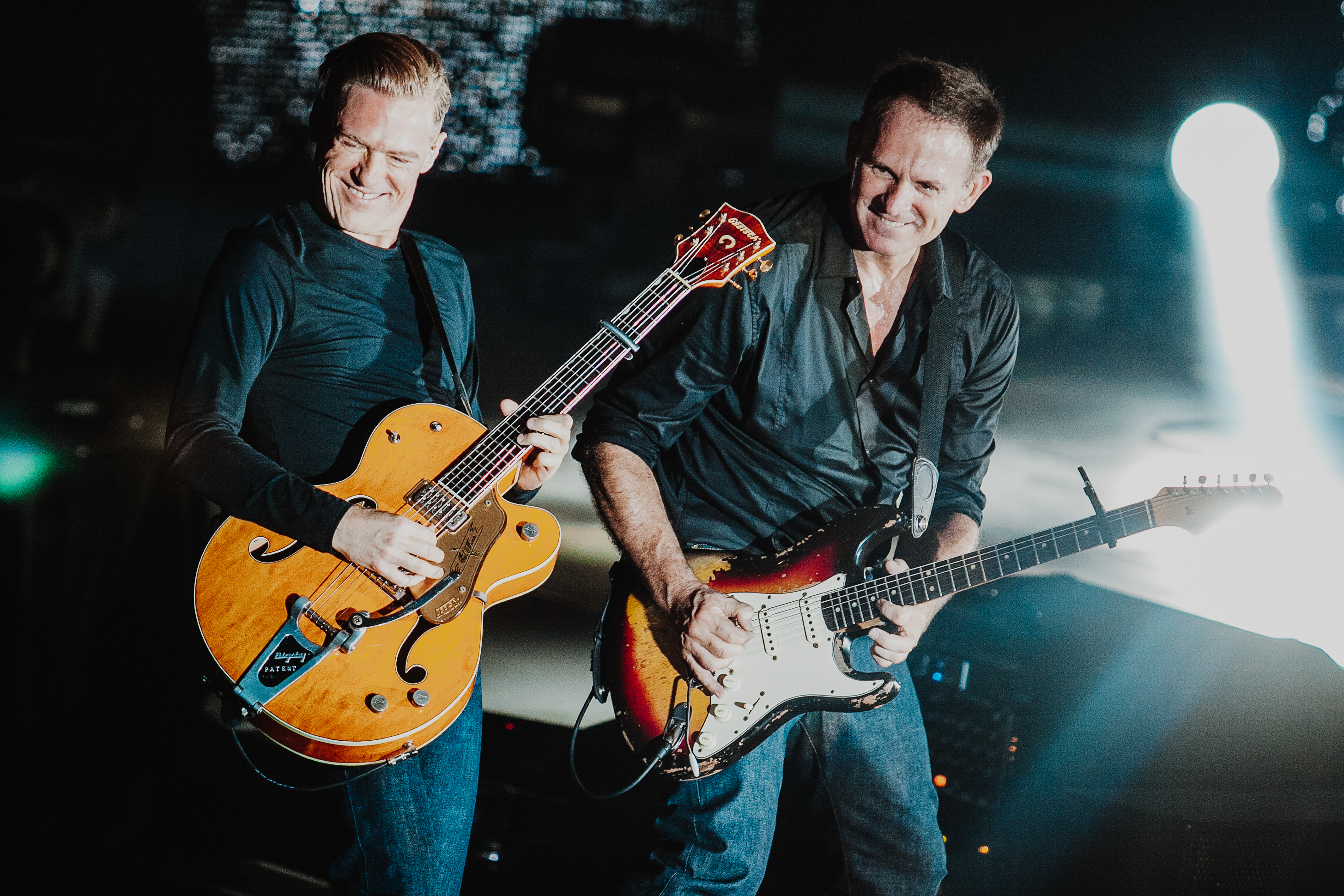
Bryan Adams playing a Chet Atkins model 6120.

=== Chet Atkins Collection ===
- G6120 Chet Atkins Hollow Body (includes several reissues and models with some minor variations, such as "DynaSonic" pickups)
- Vintage Select Edition '55 Chet Atkins
- Vintage Select Edition '59 Chet Atkins

=== Other signature models ===
- G6120 Eddie Cochran Signature (2011-) (followed the G6120EC Eddie Cochran Tribute Guitar, a limited edition of 50)
- G6120DE — Duane Eddy (1997-2003; 2011-)
- 6120RHH — The Reverend Horton Heat (2016-) (Professional Collection series)
- G6120TSW — Steve Wariner Signature Nashville Gentleman (2019-)
- G6126TCC — Chris Cheney (2008-?)
- G6120KS — Keith Scott Nashville (1999-2012)
