= Charles Koen =

American minister and civil rights activist

- Born: 1945; Cairo, Illinois
- Died: July 20, 2018 (aged 72–73)
- Occupations: Activist, Minister
- Organization(s): Black Liberators, Black United Front Cairo,
- Known for: Civil Rights activism in Saint Louis and Cairo, Illinois

Charles "Chuck" Koen (1945 – July 20, 2018) was an African-American minister and civil rights activist from Cairo, Illinois, who served as prime minister of the Black Liberators and the executive directors of the Black United Front Cairo. Koen worked with organizations in Southern Illinois during the mid- and late 1960s. He founded the Black Liberators in St. Louis, Missouri, in 1968; he later went on to lead nationally noted campaigns in Cairo, Illinois, most notably a boycott of white-owned businesses. During his Cairo struggles, Koen was honored with a tribute on an album by jazz drummer Max Roach.

Koen was the subject of the FBI's Counter Intelligence Program (COINTELPRO), an infiltration program sanctioned by FBI Chief J. Edgar Hoover and President Richard M. Nixon against Black activists and activist groups in the 1960s and 1970s. Targets of this scheme were individuals and groups such as Martin Luther King Jr., Malcolm X, H. Rap Brown, Koen, Medgar Evers, the Black Panthers, the Black Liberators and others. The essence of this FBI ploy was to cause division in and amongst Black leadership to prevent organization and unity in the black and poor communities around the nation. Those who were not killed or were not successfully infiltrated were constant subjects of criminal arrests and indictments.
