= Black Liberators =

Militant civil rights group (founded 1968)

The Black Liberators was a militant civil-rights organization formed in St. Louis, Missouri, in the spring of 1968. The Liberators were led through most of their short existence by Charles Koen, who went on to organize a nationally noted civil-rights campaign in Cairo, Illinois.

The organization was strongly inspired by the Black Panther Party, which had established a firm base in the neighboring city of Chicago, adopting the party military-style uniforms, radical rhetoric, and black self-determination. The Black Liberators group was formally established in the summer of 1968 by veteran St. Louis civil rights activist Charles Koen opening a formal headquarters at 2810 Easton in downtown St. Louis. Just as the Black Panthers had adopted a Ten-Point Program, the Black Liberators adopted a five-point programme:

1. That we be given a chance to prove ourselves as other men have done.
2. That we gain enough living space to find ourselves and prove ourselves as full-fledged citizens.
3. That we plan to do for ourselves in all areas of human living.
4. That we move out and up into human dignity.
5. That we have sufficient funds to carry our creativity to fruition.

On August 17, 1969, the Black Liberators served as protection for African-American Congressman Adam Clayton Powell Jr. who represented New York City's historically black Harlem district. The following month the 9th Precinct of the Saint Louis Police Department was shot at by an unknown assailant and an African-American member of the police board had his real estate office firebombed, the metropolitan police suspected the Liberators.

Following these events, the Black Liberators' headquarters were substantially damaged, according to witnesses, by plainclothes police officers. Matters escalated when, eight days later, police arrested Charles Koen and Leon Dent for carrying a concealed weapon during a traffic stop, which was later determined to be a comb.

Following the arrest, Koen and Dent received strong public support from groups such as the International Brotherhood of Teamsters Local 688, NAACP, and St. Louis Argus.

In response to the arrest, the Liberators voted in favor of Yusuf Shabazz to succeed Koen as prime minister of the group, resulting in the decline and eventual end of the group. Nine months following his inauguration, Shabazz was arrested for mail fraud, and during court proceedings it was revealed that Shabazz had been operating as an informant for the metropolitan police.

== See also ==
- Black Panther Party
- Congress of Racial Equality
- W.E.B. Du Bois Clubs of America
