= Ray Butts =

American inventor and engineer

- Butts in his early 20s
- Born: Joseph Raymond Butts; September 22, 1919; Ethel, Mississippi, US
- Died: April 20, 2003 (aged 83); Nashville, Tennessee, US
- Occupations: Inventor, engineer
- Spouse: Ann Butts (m. 1946)

Joseph Raymond Butts (September 22, 1919 – April 20, 2003) was an American inventor and engineer best known for designing several devices that influenced the evolution of electrified music, in particular those used with the electric guitar. Most notably, Butts is the inventor of the EchoSonic, a guitar amplifier with a built-in tape echo, and the Filter'Tron, one of the first humbucker guitar pickups (used extensively on Gretsch guitars). He was active in other fields from studio equipment maintenance to sound engineering, and had intimate working relationships with people such as Sam Phillips at Sun Studios and Chet Atkins.

== Biography ==
As a toddler, Butts moved with his father to Cairo, Illinois, where he developed an interest in electronics, building his first crystal radio in 1928 when he was just eight years old.

=== Musical career ===
Butts was an accordion player. In the early 1940s, he moved to Calumet City, Illinois, where he played at several clubs. His band leader had a chance to join with a traveling tent show billed as a "Hillbilly Jamboree featuring the Colorado Cowhands". They played the southern coastal states before ending up in Nashville, Tennessee, where they played alternating days on the WSM's Morning Show. He returned to Calumet City, playing nights from 8:00pm to 5:00am, but his career as a musician ended abruptly when his father had a heart attack, and he moved back to Cairo.

=== "Ray Butts' Music" store (194?–1962) ===
Back in Cairo, Butts worked for an appliance store as a warranty repairman, servicing GE products ranging from washing machines to radios. Soon he started his own business, focusing on musical instruments and amplification, "Ray Butts' Music". It was a small music store; Butts' wife Ann ran the store out front and kept the books, while he tinkered in the back. This tinkering, and his connections with local musicians, led to the development of the EchoSonic.

=== EchoSonic ===
In 1952, a local guitar player named Bill Gwaltney (an admirer of Les Paul, who was known for his tape experiments) sparked Butts' interest in creating the "sound-on-sound" effect with live guitar. An early amplifier which Butts built for him used a 15-watt Gibson amplifier and a wire recorder, with disappointing results, and after some more experimentation Butts settled on the new plastic tape made by 3M, and soon created the Echosonic: Bill Gwaltney bought the first one.

In 1954, Butts went to Nashville where he looked up Chet Atkins in the phone book. After making contact and meeting, Atkins sold a brand new Fender Twin amplifier to buy the second Echosonic amp, which he went on to use in many famous recordings, including his rendition of "Mister Sandman". The next year, Elvis Presley's guitarist Scotty Moore was the next big name to start using the EchoSonic, which he did on most of Elvis' late Sun and early RCA singles, in addition to the 1968 comeback special. Butts's tape-loop technology was the basis for the later Echoplex, for which he received a "nominal sum" from the manufacturers. Though it has been represented in error by some authors in later years, Butts had received a U.S. patent for his tape echo technology in 1957.

=== Gretsch Filter'Tron pickup ===
In 1954, Gretsch began plans to produce the first Chet Atkins-endorsed guitar model, the Gretsch 6120. Atkins recorded much of his music of the 1950s with the Echosonic, but had serious hum problems caused by the single-coil pickups and an unshielded transformer in the amplifier. Butts connected two single-coil pickups serially and out of phase, creating one of the first humbucker pickups. Gretsch would mass produce this pickup as the Filter'Tron, which was used on almost all of the brand's guitars starting in 1957.
