= Fender Telecaster Bass =

Fretted electric bass

Telecaster Bass
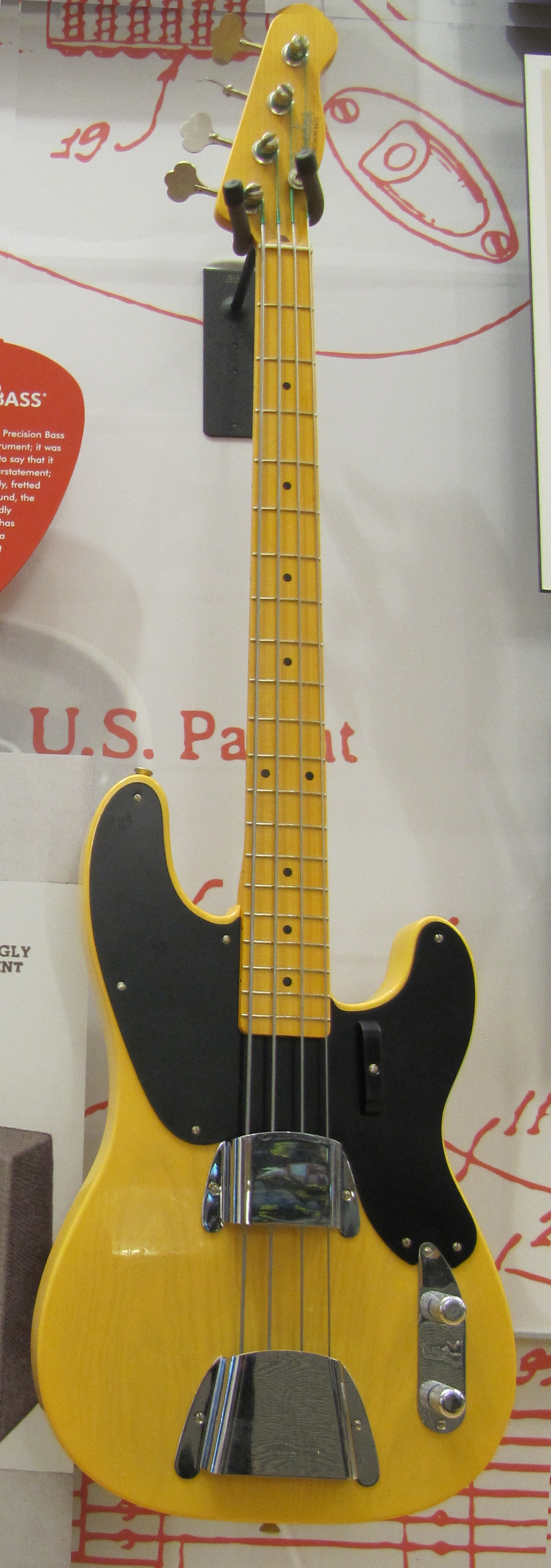
- Manufacturer: Fender; Squier
- Period: 1968–1979 (occasional reissues thereafter); 2023-present

Construction
- Body type: Solid
- Neck joint: Bolt-on

Woods
- Body: Ash, alder
- Neck: Maple
- Fretboard: Maple, rosewood

Hardware
- Bridge: Fixed
- Pickup(s): 1 single-coil pickup (1968-1971); 1 Fender Wide Range bass humbucker (1971-1979, 2023–present; 2007-2014 as Squier Vintage Modified Precision Bass TB); 2 Fender Wide Range bass humbuckers (Modern Player Series); 1 Fender Wide Range bass humbucker and 1 single-coil Jazz Bass pickup (Squier Vintage Modified Telecaster Bass Special)

Colors available
- 2-Color Sunburst, 3-Color Sunburst, Blonde, Black

The Fender Telecaster Bass (also referred as the Tele Bass) is an electric bass introduced in 1968 by Fender Musical Instruments Corporation. With few physical changes through the 1970s, it was discontinued in 1979 and reissued in 2007 by Fender's subsidiary Squier as the Squier Vintage Modified Precision Bass TB, which was discontinued in 2014. In 2023, the instrument was reintroduced as part of Fender's Vintera II lineup.

Released as a rebranding of the original version of the Fender Precision Bass, it was named as "Telecaster" after the Telecaster guitar model. The Telecaster Bass differs in shape from the original Telecaster guitar in that the latter is a single cutaway guitar and the bass is double cutaway.

== History and details ==
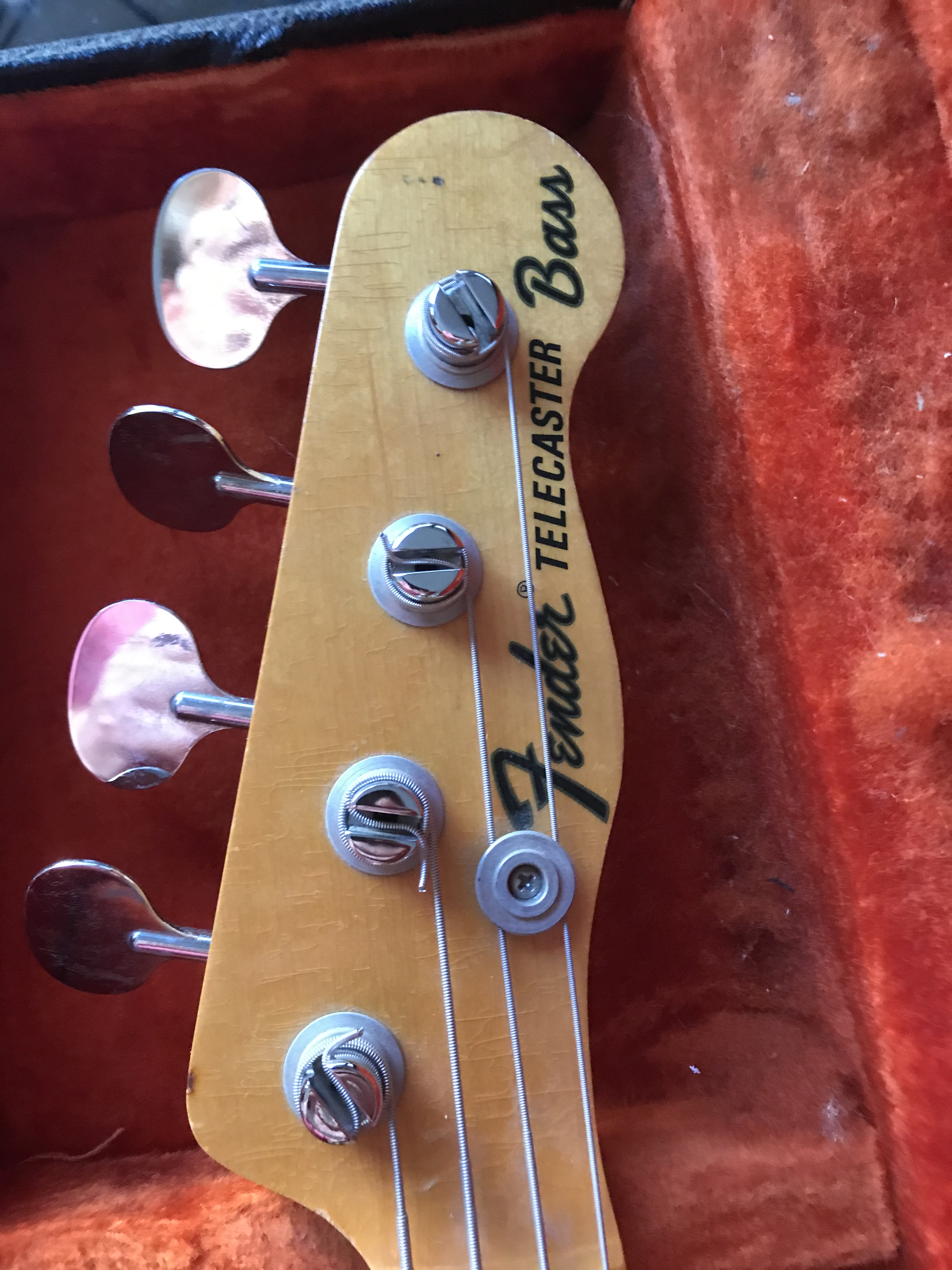

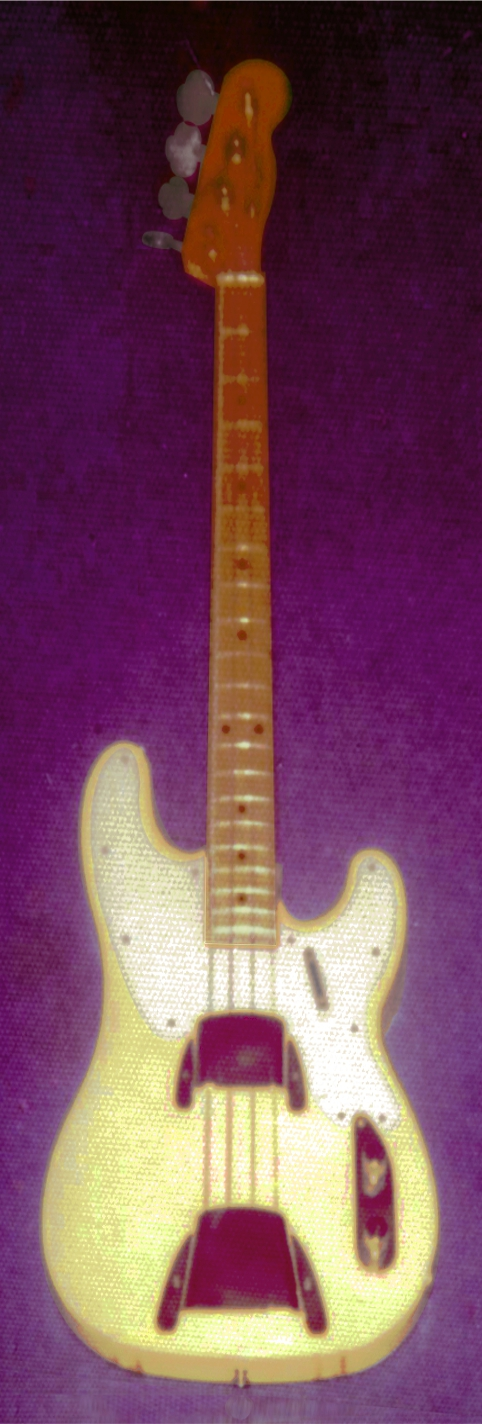
Early version

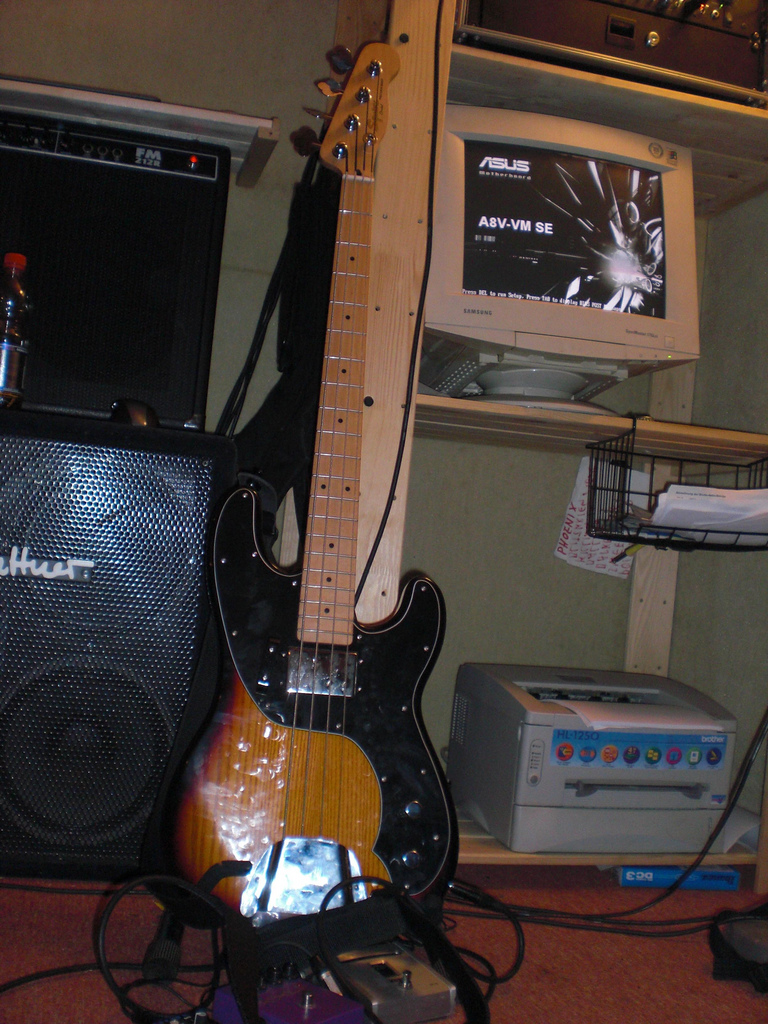
Squier Vintage Modified Precision Bass, reproducing the look of the second version.

=== Early version (1968–1971) ===
The Telecaster Bass was introduced in May 1968 being essentially a straight reissue of the original 1951 Precision Bass design (which was in fact influenced by the Telecaster guitar), with a large pickguard, small Telecaster-shaped headstock, single pickup, and separate chrome control plate. Early versions had a two-piece maple-capped neck with no "skunk stripe" on the back of the neck and some also had the rare paddle-style tuners that were most commonly seen on the Jazz Bass. The pickguard on the 1960s Telecaster Bass was slightly more slender and employed more mounting screws than the originals of the 1950s. There were also three different headstock decals in the early version. The earliest had a regular silver Telecaster guitar logo with the word "bass" added underneath. Only prototypes are known to have this decal. The earliest prototypes were partially constructed from leftover 1952 Precision Bass parts. The second decal was the larger Black (gold outlined) Telecaster Bass logo (bass being in the same style of script as Fender). The third and most commonly used decal had the silver Fender script with the words Telecaster Bass written in a sans-serif type font underneath.

In the early 1990s, Fender Japan reissued the '51 Precision Bass, which is in essence, a reissue of the first-version Telecaster Bass. The earliest "Made in Japan" versions vary slightly from the later "Crafted in Japan" model. For example, the early 1990s version uses the larger, more historically accurate string ferrules that were used in the 1950s.

=== Second version (1971–1979) ===
In 1971, the Tele Bass was modified in some aspects. A new neck plate with Micro Tilt system for a more precise neck adjustment. The old-style pickguard was redesigned to eliminate the control plate, and the single-coil pickup was replaced with a larger, more powerful, humbucking unit. The Telecaster Bass was produced alongside the contemporary Precision Bass through all the 1970s. The decal logo had changed from silver to gold, with black outlining. It was the final version of the Telecaster Bass, and was discontinued in September 1979.

== Reissues ==
=== Fender ===
In 2011, Fender reintroduced the model as a part of their Modern Player series, featuring two Modern Player Wide Range Humbucking pickups, three-ply parchment (Sunburst model) or single-ply black (Butterscotch Blonde model) pickguard, three knurled "chrome-dome" control knobs (neck volume, bridge volume, master tone), vintage-style bridge with four brass saddles, open-gear tuners and nickel/chrome hardware. Available in 2-Color Sunburst and Butterscotch Blonde. This model also featured a contoured body with belly and arm cuts, and was based on the '71-'79 Tele Bass.

A new version of the instrument was introduced as a part of the limited Parallel Universe series in 2018. This version was modeled after the '68-'71 Tele Bass, but featured a P/J pickup configuration. This model was only available in Blonde.

As a part of the Vintera II series, released in late 2023, the '71-'79 version of the bass was given a straight reissue. The reissue was available in 2 colors, Surf Green or Vintage White (Cream).

=== Squier ===
==== Classic Vibe Series ====
Squier is a subsidiary of Fender and features less expensive versions of Fender instruments. As part of their 'Classic Vibe' series, Squier has issued a 1950s Precision Bass model in the style of the original Fender 1951 Precision Bass. It comes in three finishes: A Butterscotch Blonde with a black pickguard, a Lake Placid Blue metallic with a white pickguard, & a White Blonde with a white pickguard. All have maple fretboards as well as contoured edges & front & back comfort contours, making them similar to the 54-57 Precision Bass design. The pickup on these models is a single-coil similar to that at the bridge position on a Telecaster guitar.

In August 2025, as part of a new group of models added to the series, Squier introduced a 1970s Telecaster Bass based on the second version of the original Fender model. The bass includes a 20-fret maple neck and is available in two colors: Mocha and Vintage White. Unlike the original model, this bass features an Alnico humbucker in place of the original CuNiFe pickup, and has a contoured body.

==== Special Models ====
The Squier Vintage Modified Precision Bass TB was released in April 2007. It is based on the second version of the Telecaster Bass, featuring a similar Telecaster Bass headstock, pickguard and humbucking pickup.

Modeled after the Telecaster guitar, the Squier Vintage Modified Telecaster and Telecaster Special basses feature a Telecaster guitar-shaped basswood body, Telecaster-style control plate and a 32"-scale maple neck/fretboard with 20 frets. The Vintage Modified Telecaster Bass sports a Duncan Designed PB-102 SCPB single-coil pickup and three-way switching among special tone circuits, which feature a modern bass sound (middle switch position, volume and tone controls), softer "double bass" sound (neck switch position, volume control only) and authentic tic-tac "baritone" sound (bridge switch position, volume control only). The Telecaster Bass Special has a large chrome-covered Fender-designed Wide Range humbucking neck pickup paired with a Duncan Designed JB-102B single-coil Jazz Bass bridge pickup and three-way blade switching. Other features include black "barrel" switch tip, knurled chrome control knobs, vintage style bridge with four chrome saddles, vintage-style tuners and strap buttons and a single-ply white or black pickguard. Available in Black and White Blonde finishes. Introduced in August 2012.

== Notable users ==
- Jimmy Bain used a Telecaster Bass among his basses with Rainbow
- Arthur Kane of New York Dolls
- Charlie Tumahai of English progressive rock band Be-Bop Deluxe and New Zealand reggae band Herbs, played a 1968–1971 version of the Telecaster Bass.
- Paul McGuigan of britpop band Oasis played the 1968–1971 version.
- Dusty Hill of ZZ Top.
- Doug Stegmeyer of Billy Joel's band used a blonde 1968 Telecaster Bass.
- George Porter Jr. of The Meters used a '68–71 Telecaster Bass in the band's early years.
- Chris Squire of Yes, used a '68 Telecaster Bass (with a single-coil bridge pickup added) on several occasions from the late 1960s to the mid-1970s.
- Jill Emery of Hole plays a 1971 Fender Telecaster Bass
- Wilton Felder
- Ronnie Wood of the Jeff Beck Group used a Telecaster Bass.
- Tim Bogert of Vanilla Fudge and Beck, Bogert and Appice used a Telecaster Bass.
- Rick Kemp of Steeleye Span used a Telecaster Bass.
- Composer and multi-instrumentalist Mike Oldfield used a Telecaster Bass on his debut album Tubular Bells.
- Nick Lowe used a Telecaster Bass during his time with Rockpile and can be seen holding one on the cover of his 1978 album Jesus of Cool.
- John Paul Jones of Led Zeppelin
