= Fender Precision Bass =

Model of electric bass

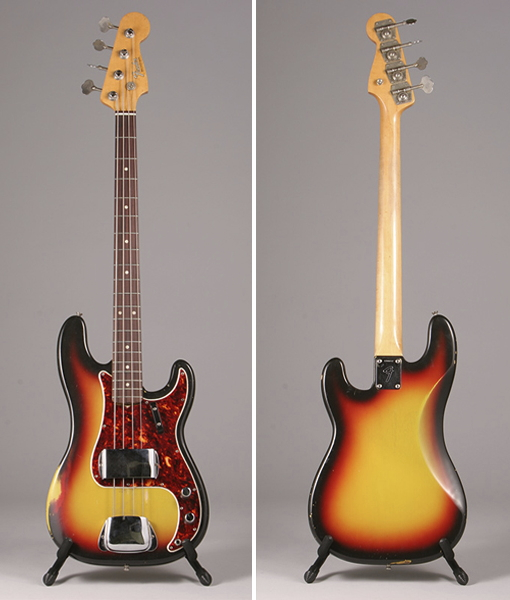
- Manufacturer: Fender
- Period: 1951–present

Construction
- Body type: Solid
- Neck joint: Bolt-on
- Scale: 34"

Woods
- Body: Alder, Ash, Poplar, Basswood
- Neck: Maple
- Fretboard: Maple, Rosewood, Pau ferro, Ebony

Hardware
- Bridge: Fixed
- Pickup(s): One single-coil (1951–1957, occasional reissues); Usually one two-piece split-coil humbucker (1957–present); One split-coil humbucker and one Jazz Bass single-coil ("PJ" configuration); One split-coil humbucker and one humbucking Jazz Bass pickup (1995–2009)

Colors available
- Various bursts, various solid and transparent colors

The Fender Precision Bass (often shortened to "P-Bass") is an electric bass guitar model manufactured by Fender since 1951. The Precision Bass is a solid body, four-stringed, full scale bass guitar equipped with a single pickup and a 20-fret maple neck. It produces a characteristically "deep and full-bodied sound."

Leo Fender designed the Precision Bass prototype in 1950 for big band bass players and it was brought to market the following year. Roy Johnson of Lionel Hampton's big band was among the first bass players to use the Precision Bass in a concert setting. Music critic Leonard Feather wrote about this new development in Down Beat magazine, expressing surprise at hearing bass sounds from a guitar. Adoption by upright bass players was slow, however, and the Precision Bass did not find widespread success until the emergence of new styles of music like rock and roll and Motown, with the Precision Bass's guitar-like format allowing guitarists to easily transition to this new instrument. In 1957, Fender introduced several design changes to its bass, notably altering the headstock and pickguard to more closely resemble those of the popular Stratocaster, and switching to a split-coil humbucker pickup. Fender reissued the original Precision Bass design in 1968 as the Telecaster Bass.

The Precision Bass, as the first commercially successful electric bass, was a "landmark in the evolution of musical instruments", delivering "punch and presence while enabling a fleeter, guitar-like playability." Some historians consider the Precision Bass to have had a greater impact on popular music than Fender's widely-known Telecaster and Stratocaster electric guitars. Its companion bass amplifier, the Fender Bassman, also proved influential. Since its release, the Precision Bass has remained among the best-selling and most imitated electric bass guitars.

== Design overview ==
The Precision Bass uses a body shape similar to the earlier Esquire/Telecaster, but with an additional bass-side "horn", creating a double-cutaway silhouette that provided better balance considering the long, heavy neck required of a bass guitar. In its initial incarnation, the Precision Bass used squared-off edges without contouring, but rounded edges and contouring were introduced after the similarly-styled Stratocaster's release. The body was made of two pieces of matched and laminated ash, which was chosen for its appearance rather than tone. Alder became standard on models with sunburst finishes, as alder was cheaper and easier to finish.

Fender chose a 34" scale length for the Precision Bass after much trial and error. Thirty-four inches proved long enough to achieve the resonance Fender wanted but it was short enough to avoid uncomfortably-wide fret spacing. Not prioritizing the player's comfort was considered "marketing suicide" by Leo Fender. The 34" scale length went on to become standard for "full scale" electric basses. Pre-1957 models used a headstock similar to a Telecaster, but this was later changed to bring it more in line with the Stratocaster's styling. The neck—initially made from a single piece of maple, but with rosewood later offered as a fretboard option—was bolted on using four screws, rather than glued onto the body. The neck used a large "C"-shape with a 7.25" radius fretboard, which has earned vintage Precision Bass necks frequent "baseball bat" comparisons. Modern versions typically use a flatter 9.5" radius.

Pre-1957, strings were loaded through the body and over a bridge equipped with two pressed fiber saddles; post-1957, the strings were loaded at the bridge, which was later updated with four saddles made of steel. The bridge was initially equipped with a chrome cover with a foam insert to help mute the strings and prevent unwanted overtones and sustain. Players, however, often removed this cover to achieve a more cutting tone and Fender eventually stopped including them. The original model's pickguard covered much of the Precision Bass's body, including both horns. The later redesign was more Strat-like, covering less of the body but now with the bass's controls mounted directly onto it, as was a finger rest (or "tugbar") below the G string. At different times, the pickguard has been black, white, and tortoiseshell.

=== Pickups ===
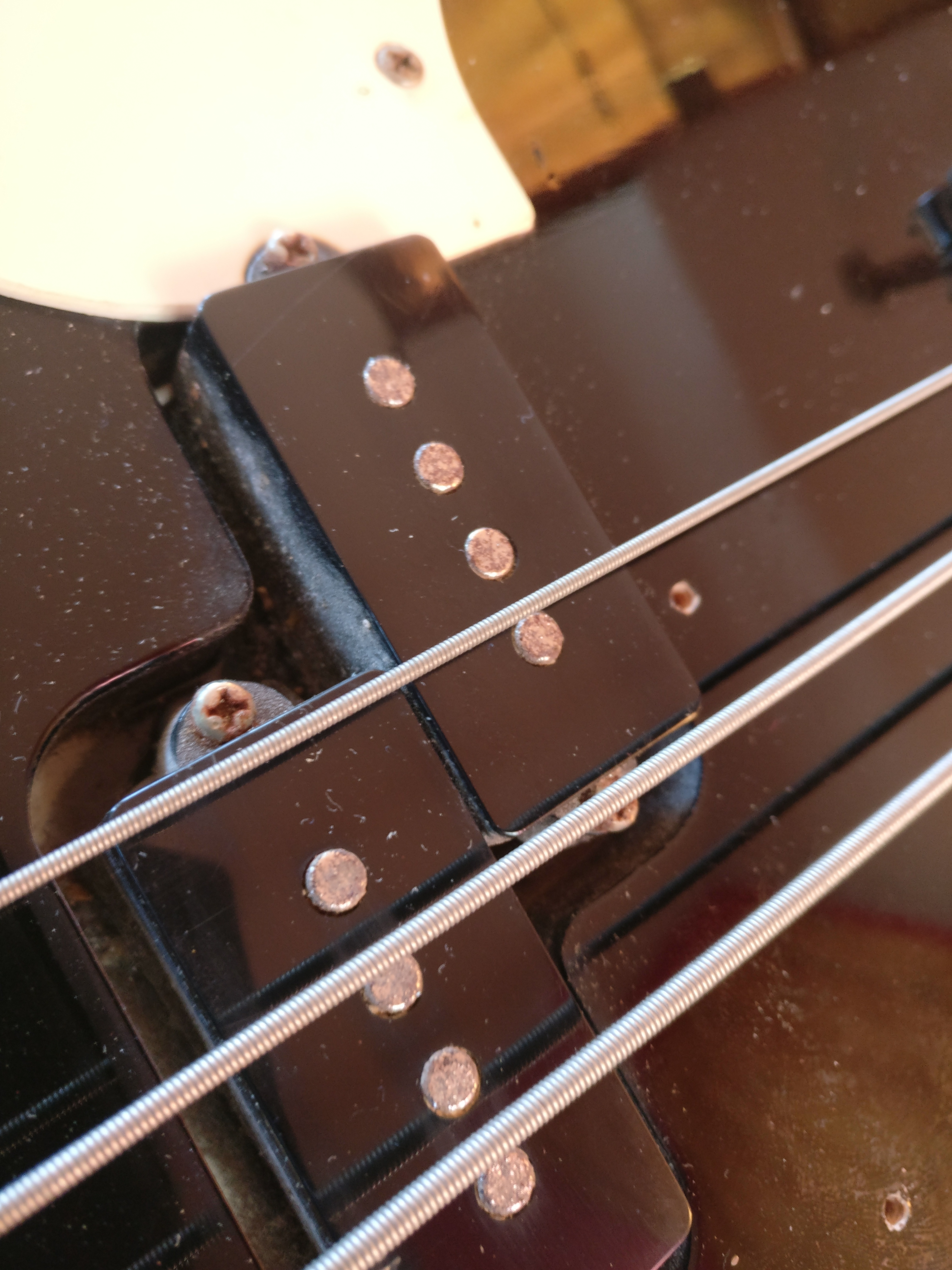
Close-up of a post-1957 Precision Bass split-coil pickup

The first pickups used on a Precision Bass consisted of a simple, single-coil design with four Alnico V magnet pole pieces, each placed directly below a string. Early on, a large chrome cover was placed over the pickup to provide electronic shielding. Leo Fender was dissatisfied with the pickup's hum, however, and the pole piece placement meant the pickup generated strong attack transients that were hard on speakers. Fender solved the hum problem by splitting the pickup into two separate coils, which were wired out of phase with the magnets oriented with reverse polarities. The transient problem was solved by placing pole pieces on either side of each string, rather than under them, smoothing out the attack and improving tone and gain. These pickups have remained standard in Precision Basses ever since they were introduced in 1957. Some contemporary Precision Bass models additionally use a Fender Jazz Bass bridge pickup in what is known as a "PJ" pickup configuration.

=== Tone ===
Guitar World described the Precision Bass as being "all about power", with a "deep and full-bodied sound" and a "monstrous low-end rumble."

== History ==
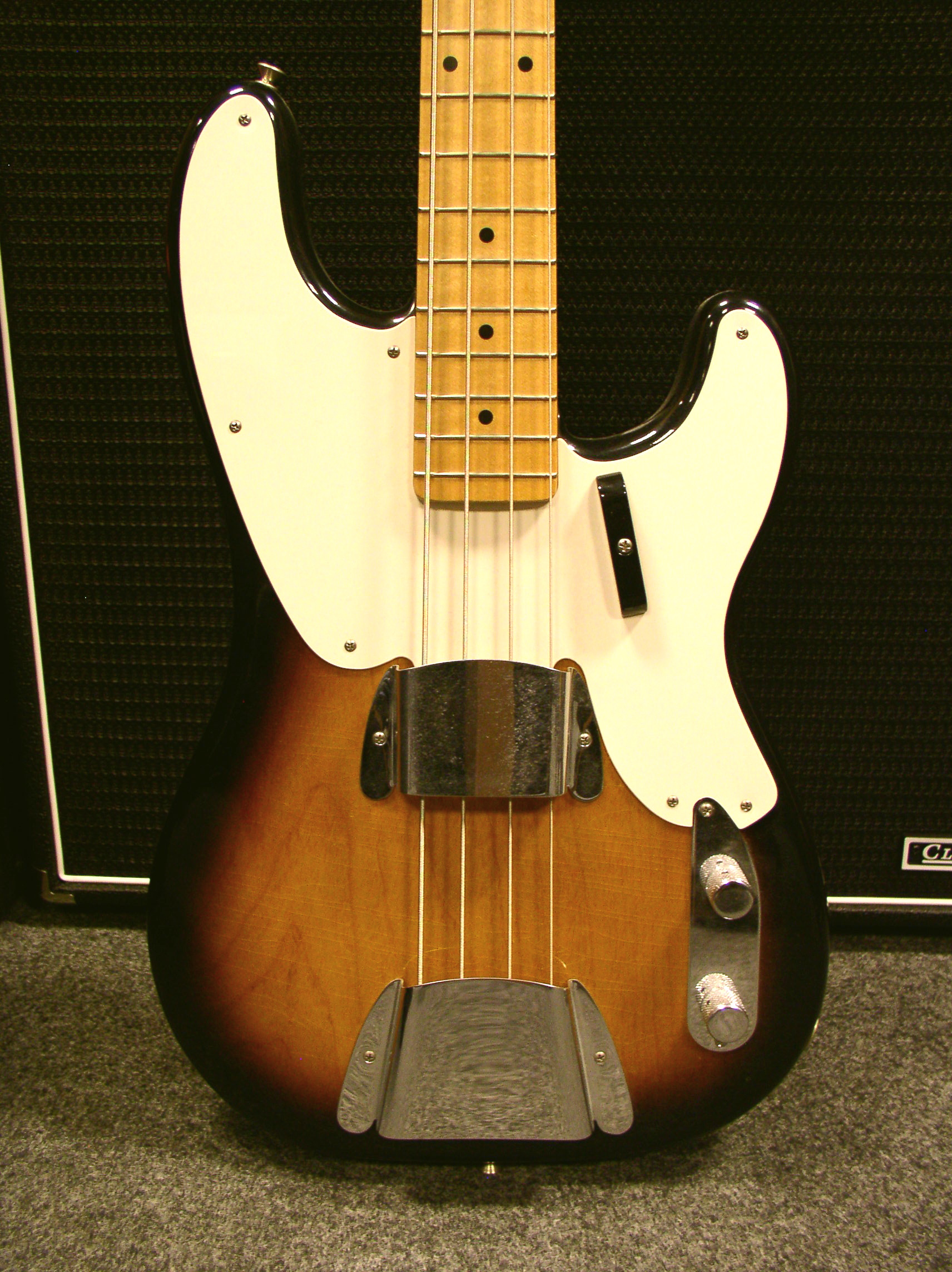
A 1956 Precision Bass reissue

=== Development ===
Prior to the arrival of electric bass guitars, players relied on upright basses, which were large and cumbersome to transport and increasingly difficult to hear as popular music became louder, thanks in part to the popularity of horn sections and newly electrified guitars. At the time, many big bands were downsizing and asking guitarists to double as bass players, creating a need for a guitar-like bass to avoid players having to learn upright bass technique. Fender was not the first to explore the idea of a solidbody electric bass as a solution: Audiovox had released such a bass in 1935, but it sold poorly and most other companies pursuing the electrification of the bass kept to an upright format. Leo Fender choosing to design his electric bass to be played at a horizontal angle similar to a guitar allowed guitarists to easily transition to playing bass.

Following the principle of "bigger for bass", Fender opted to repurpose the Esquire in a slightly larger format for the brand's new bass model. The Precision Bass shared many similarities with its guitar counterpart, including its headstock shape, non-contoured "slab" body made of ash, and bolt-on maple neck. The Precision Bass, however, used a double-cutaway design with two protruding "horns" instead of one and employed a 34" scale length. The name "Precision Bass" referenced the precision in which Fender's factory construction methods could install frets to achieve the most accurate pitch and intonation, something Fender and his engineering-oriented mind was described as being "possessed" with. Only a transparent blonde finish was available upon release.

=== Release ===
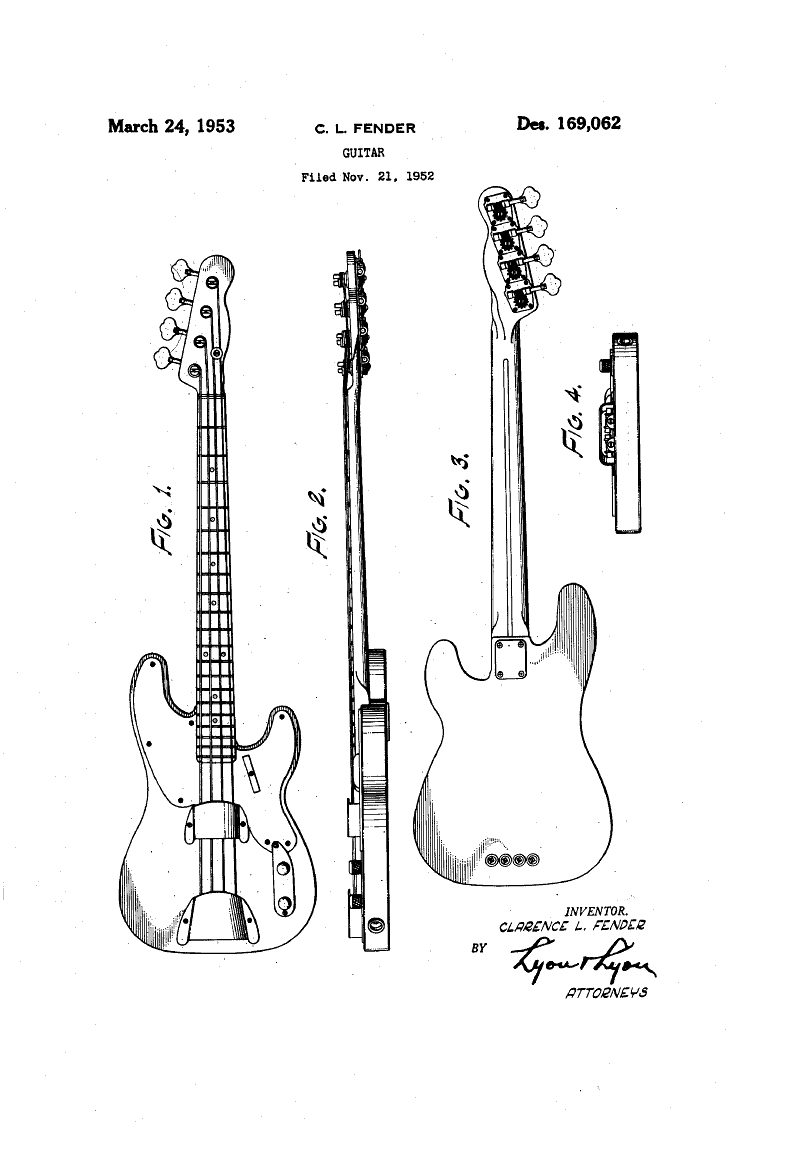
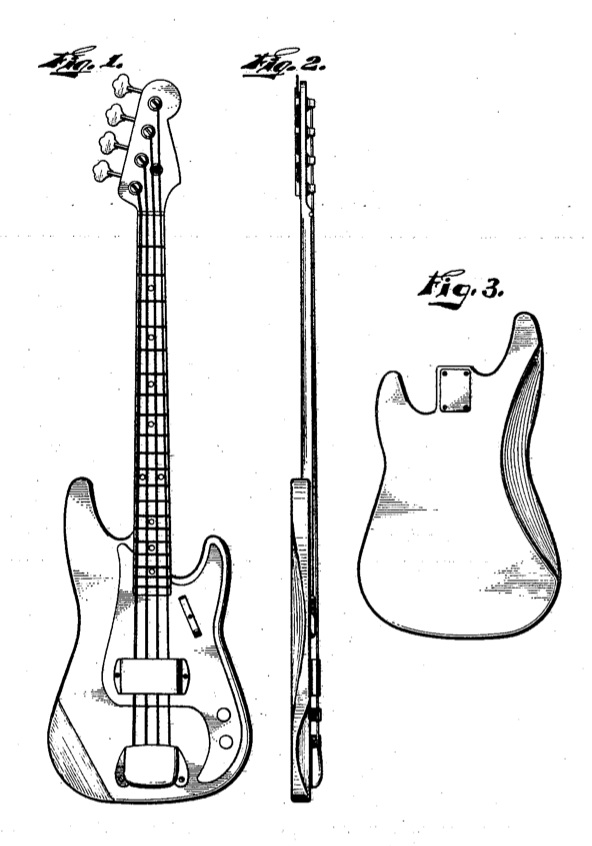
Patent sketches for a 1951 Precision Bass (left) and its later redesign

The Precision Bass was first offered for sale in October of 1951, making its trade show debut at the July 1952 NAMM Show. Fender applied for the patent for his bass guitar design in November of 1952, and it was granted on March 24 1953. The Precision Bass had an initial retail price of $199.50.

The Precision Bass gained little notice at first. Distributors were aghast at the new instrument and few artists showed any interest. To promote his bass, Fender traveled the country, trying to win over musicians face-to-face in nightclubs and concert halls, where he found the most interest from jazz players. Bandleader Lionel Hampton became an early champion of the Precision Bass: his bass player Roy Johnson used it extensively, later stating he had no trouble transitioning to the new bass, which he began using in performances the day he received it. Chicago's budget instrument retailer Kay Musical Instrument Company was one of the first companies to realize the potential of the Precision Bass and licensed their own models from Fender; these Kay basses were taken up by influential players like Chubby Jackson and Donald "Duck" Dunn.

As smaller, louder groups became more popular mid-decade, the Precision Bass slowly started replacing more upright basses, but players faced issues with the poor quality of amplification at the time. Fender's existing guitar amplifiers, such as the 15" speaker-equipped Fender Pro that the Precision Bass was initially paired with, proved unable to handle lower frequencies at loud volumes, forcing the company to design the first ever dedicated bass amplifier, the Bassman. The Bassman was pivotal to legitimizing the Precision Bass and became an influential amp in its own right—among guitarists even more so than bassists.

=== Redesigns ===
While Fender released several guitar designs throughout the 1950s, the company chose to maintain the Precision as their sole bass guitar model and continue making design alterations to it. In 1954/55, the bass was updated with body and forearm contouring similar to the new Stratocaster and switched to a white pickguard. Fender also began offering a two-tone sunburst finish as standard, while around the same time custom colors like Olympic White, Foam Green, and Fiesta Red became available.

The Precision Bass's most significant revision came in 1957. The headstock shape and pickguard were redesigned to loosely resemble the Strat's, with the pickguard no longer covering the upper horn but now extending along the lower edge of the body to cover the control knob area. This new pickguard was made of a single layer of gold-anodized aluminum with the electronics—including a new "split-coil" humbucking pickup—mounted directly onto it. This pickguard material scratched easily though and was soon replaced with tortoiseshell plastic. Strings were now loaded through the bridge, rather than going through the body, and the bridge was upgraded to using four saddles for better intonation. These changes solidified the Precision Bass's basic design, which has remained largely unchanged since.

In 1959, a glued-on rosewood fingerboard featuring "clay"-style dot position markers replaced the one-piece maple neck. This remained standard until 1966/67, when the now-CBS-owned Fender company began to offer a separate, laminated maple fingerboard capped on a maple neck as another option. Fewer than 200 Precision Basses were sold a year in the early 1950s, but this increased to around 1,000 a year by 1959.

=== Wider acceptance ===
By the 1960s, the Precision Bass was becoming the industry standard in genres like rock and pop. Brian Wilson taught himself to play bass in a matter of days with a Precision his father bought him, and he went on to score numerous hits with The Beach Boys throughout the decade. Meanwhile, James Jamerson provided the bass lines for a wave of Motown hits using a 1962 Precision he dubbed "the Funk Machine". Across the Atlantic, John Entwistle built his own copy of a Precision Bass as a teenager before they finally became available in the U.K. in the 1960s when he joined The Who. Only minor revisions occurred during this time period, such as switching to faux pearl fretboard inlays and the use of a darker, heavier headstock logo.

The original Telecaster-derived design, with a few updates, was reintroduced in 1968 as the Fender Telecaster Bass. Within a few years, this evolved into a model distinctly different from the contemporary Precision Bass, alongside which it was marketed through 1979. Two artist signature models later used the Telecaster Bass body style: the Mike Dirnt Precision Bass, using today's standard single split-coil pick-up, and the Sting Precision Bass, using a single coil pick-up as did the earliest design. In 1972, an updated version of 1968's Telecaster Bass was released; its noteworthy change was the switch to a large humbucker pickup designed by Seth Lover, the inventor of the P.A.F., who had joined Fender in 1967.

=== Modern era ===
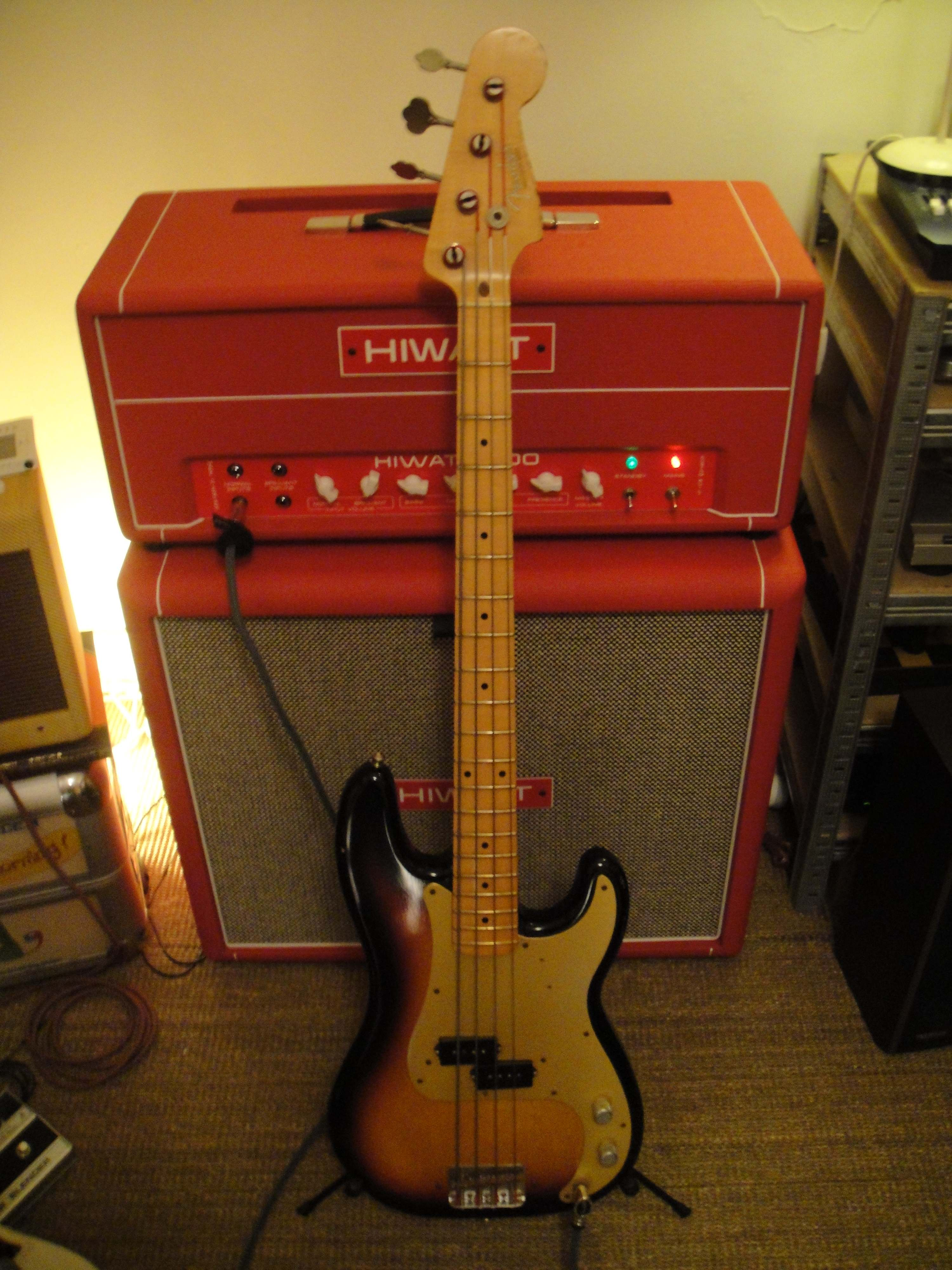
1958 reissue Precision bass

Fender entered its modern era in the 1980s, following a decline in popularity as instrument quality was seen as having suffered under CBS's takeover of Fender. Because of its simplicity, the Precision Bass was not as adversely affected by cost-cutting measures as other models in Fender's product catalog and it remained popular among players. In 1980, Fender released the Precision Bass Special, its first bass model to use active pickups.

Under new leadership hoping to restore the brand's reputation, production of Fender instruments moved to Japan as Fender's U.S. factories were reorganized. Among the first of Fender's new products to come out of this move were the "Vintage Reissue" series, which included two historically accurate Precision Bass models, the '57 Precision Bass and '62 Precision Bass. Production returned to the United States in 1987 with a renewed focus on quality and "back to basics" redesigns; new models included the "American Standard" series Precision Bass and the Precision Bass Plus, the latter of which used Lace Sensor pickups and featured a 22-fret neck and longer upper horn.

Fender overhauled its entire catalog of U.S. bass products in 1995. New models included the U.S. Deluxe Precision (later renamed the American Deluxe), a 50th anniversary Precision Bass, the Hot Rod Precision, and the five-string American Deluxe Five Precision. In 2001, Fender released the 50th Anniversary Precision Bass to celebrate five decades of continuous production, with its outward appearance still relatively unchanged since its redesign in 1957. Fender has since released further Precision Bass models as part of its American Elite, American Performer, and Player product series.

== Legacy ==
The Precision Bass was the first commercially successful electric bass, and as such it has been described as a "landmark in the evolution of musical instruments", delivering "punch and presence while enabling a fleeter, guitar-like playability." Some historians consider the Precision Bass to have had a greater impact on popular music than Fender's widely-known Telecaster and Stratocaster electric guitars. Quincy Jones stated the Precision Bass was "the one technological breakthrough that changed music forever." Its companion bass amplifier, the Fender Bassman, also proved influential, especially in the development of electric guitar amplifiers.

Numerous bass players have co-designed signature model Precision Basses with Fender, including Sting of the Police, Mike Dirnt of Green Day, Tony Franklin, Duff McKagan of Guns N' Roses and Velvet Revolver, Steve Harris of Iron Maiden, Roger Waters of Pink Floyd, and Nate Mendel of the Foo Fighters.

Since its release, the Precision Bass has remained among the best-selling and most imitated electric bass guitars. After leaving his namesake company, Leo Fender himself went on to co-design the Music Man StingRay, which was effectively an updated version of the Precision Bass.

== Artists ==
There are many artists known for using the Precision Bass Guitar. A few of the more notable artists include:

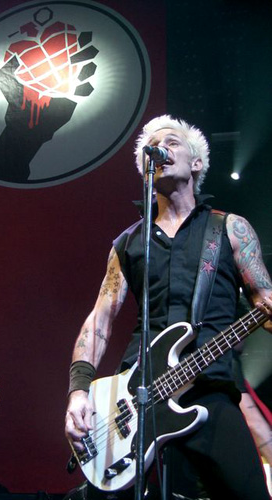
Green Day's Mike Dirnt with his 1951-style signature Precision Bass

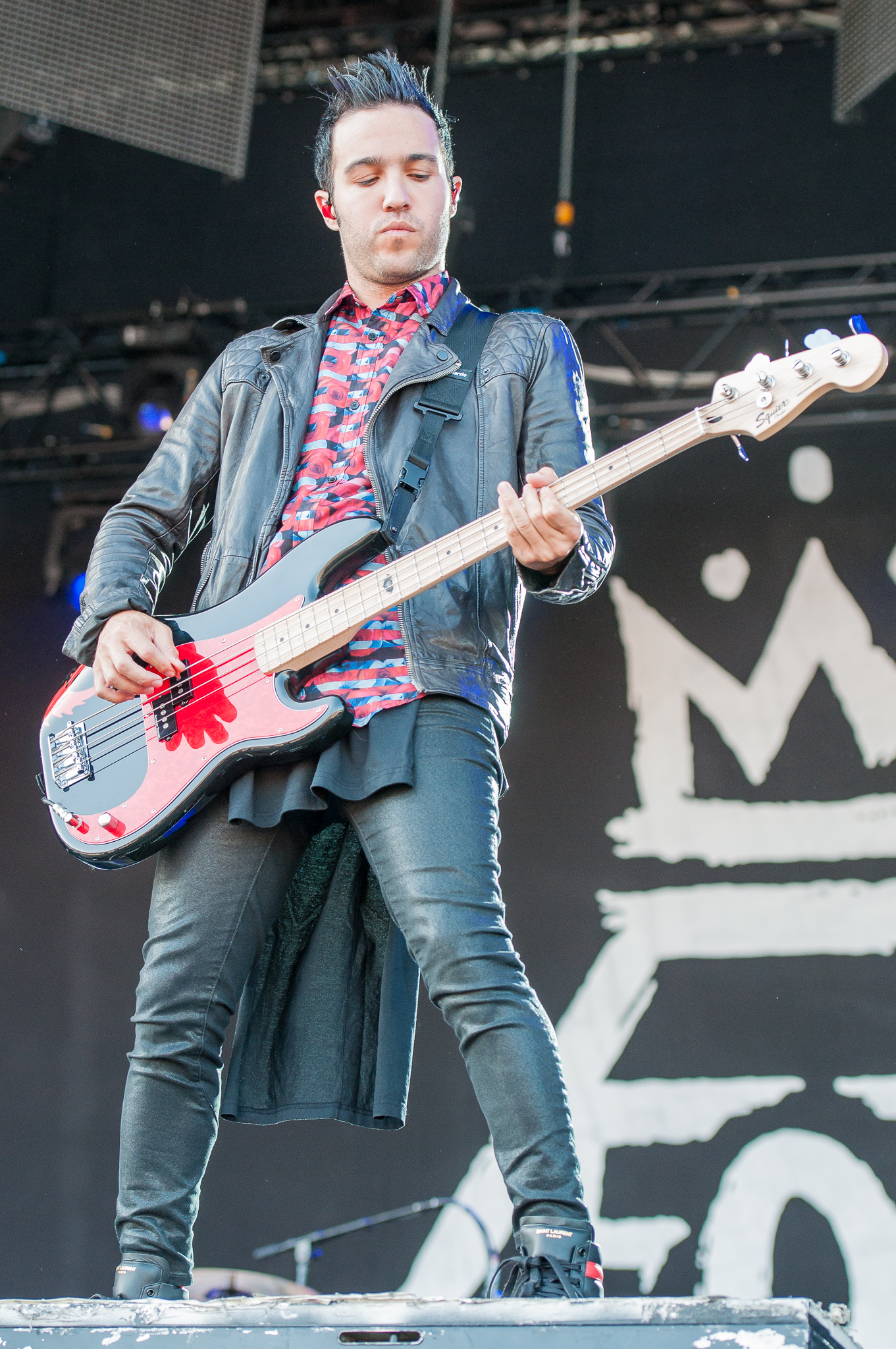
Pete Wentz of Fall Out Boy with his Signature Squier Precision Bass

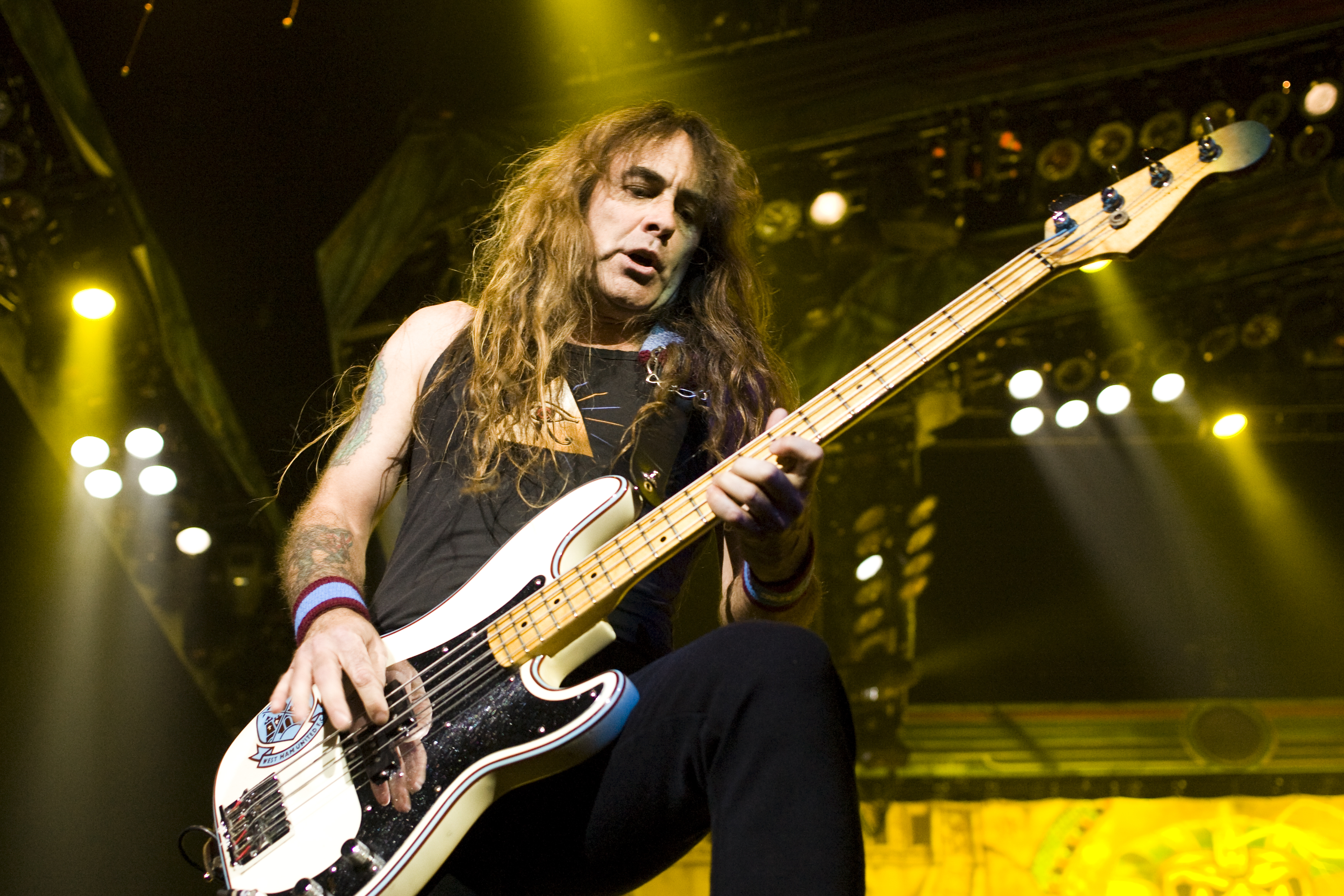
Steve Harris of Iron Maiden playing his signature Fender Precision P Bass.

- Guy Berryman of Coldplay
- Bill Black (Elvis Presley and the Blue Moon Boys, Bill Black's Combo)
- John Cale of the Velvet Underground
- Peter Cetera of Chicago
- Tommy Cogbill (session bassist with the Memphis Boys, notably played with Elvis Presley, Dusty Springfield, Neil Diamond)
- Mike Dirnt of Green Day
- Brian Wilson of the Beach Boys
- Donald "Duck" Dunn of Booker T. & the M.G.'s (also a session musician for Stax Records and Stac Studio)
- Tony Franklin
- Emory Gordy, Jr. (session bassist, most notably worked with Elvis Presley and Gordy's wife Patty Loveless)
- Steve Harris of Iron Maiden
- James Jamerson (session musician for Motown Records) used a sunburst 1962 Precision Bass nicknamed the "Funk Machine" on most sessions during the mid-1960s and up until his death.
- Carol Kaye (session musician, part of the Wrecking Crew) played Fender Precision on the majority of her sessions, but after 1978 her favorite electric bass was the Music Man StingRay.
- John Lodge
- Duff McKagan of Guns N' Roses
- Randy Meisner (Rick Nelson and the Stone Canyon Band, Poco, Eagles)
- Jean Millington of Fanny
- Paul Simonon of the Clash
- Pino Palladino
- Norbert Putnam (session musician with the first lineup of the Muscle Shoals Rhythm Section and later with the "Nashville Cats," worked especially with Elvis Presley)
- Sting of the Police
- Roger Waters of Pink Floyd
- Pete Wentz of Fall Out Boy
- April Kae of Fever 333
- "Ready" Freddie Washington
- John Deacon of Queen

== See also ==
- Fender Jaguar Bass
- Fender Telecaster Bass
- Squier '51

== Literature ==
- Peter Bertges. The Fender Reference. Bomots, Saarbrücken. 2007. ISBN 978-3-939316-38-1.
- Martin Kelly, Terry Foster, Paul Kelly. Fender: The Golden Age 1946–1970. London & New York: Cassell. 2010. ISBN 1-84403-666-9
