= Fender Telecaster Custom =

Variation of the Fender Telecaster

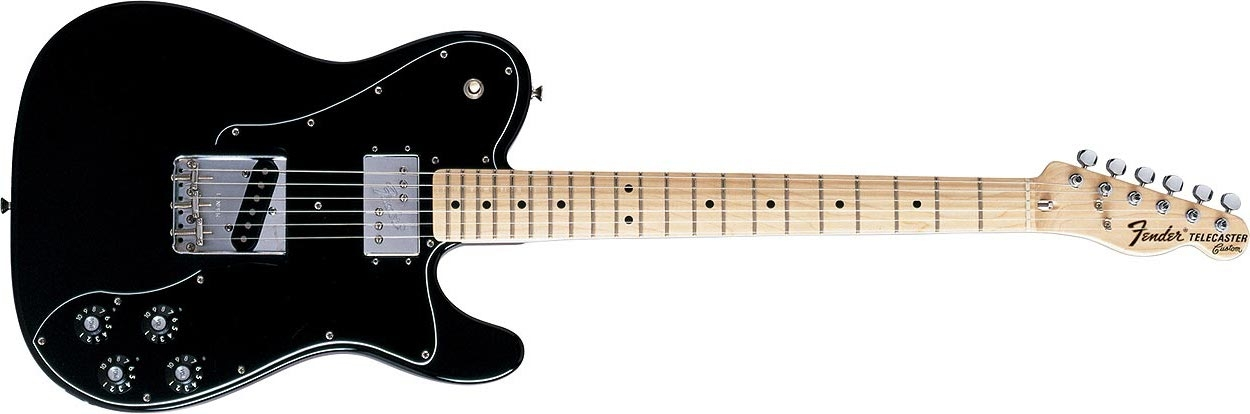
- Manufacturer: Fender
- Period: 1959-1981 (original production)

Construction
- Body type: Solid
- Neck joint: Bolt-on neck
- Scale: 25.5"

Woods
- Body: Alder
- Neck: Maple
- Fretboard: Maple/Rosewood

Hardware
- Bridge: Fixed
- Pickup(s): Two Single-coils (1959-1972); One single-coil (bridge) and one Fender Wide Range humbucker (neck) (1972-1981)

Colors available
- Black, 3-Color Sunburst

The Fender Telecaster Custom is a model of electric guitar made by Fender. The Custom debuted at the 1959 NAMM Convention as a more ornate alternative to the standard Telecaster, with binding, a sunburst finish, and a rosewood fretboard option. Following the introduction of Fender's Wide Range humbucker pickup, the Custom was redesigned to feature that new humbucker, rather than the single-coil, in the neck position, and new tone and volume controls for each pickup. This new version was launched alongside the similar Telecaster Deluxe in 1972 and found notable players including Keith Richards and Peter Buck, but neither guitar was popular and both were discontinued in 1981. Fender has since reissued the two models multiple times to take advantage of renewed interest in them that began in the 1990s.

== History ==
=== "Custom Telecaster" (1959-1972) ===
In 1958, Fender sought to add a more ornate version of the Telecaster to its lineup. The brand added binding to the body and offered a sunburst finish and rosewood fretboard as options, but otherwise maintained the original's core design. Fender debuted their new guitar model at the 1959 NAMM Convention. Despite reading "Custom Telecaster" on the headstock, the model appeared in catalogs and price guides as the "Telecaster Custom".

By the late 1960s, however, the popularity of single-coil pickups began to wane as rock music became heavier and guitarists increasingly favored humbucker pickups popularized by Gibson's guitars. Fender responded by hiring P.A.F. creator and former Gibson employee Seth Lover to design what would become Fender's Wide Range humbucker, which first appeared in the brand's semi-hollowbody Thinline model in 1971.

=== "Telecaster Custom" (1972-1981) ===
A popular modification of the Telecaster, especially among rock guitarists, was to route the body and alter the pickguard to accept a Gibson humbucker in the neck position, something popularized by Keith Richards with his own Telecaster, Micawber. Fender chose to replicate this mod by releasing the "Telecaster Custom" model, using a Wide Range in the neck position and adding separate volume and tone controls for each pickup, along with a three-position toggle for pickup selection on the guitar's upper bout. This brought the Telecaster design closer to that of Gibson's popular Les Paul model.

Fender launched their new Telecaster Custom in 1972 alongside the similar Telecaster Deluxe, which sported Wide Range humbuckers in both positions—making it even more similar to the Les Paul—and had a larger, CBS-era Stratocaster-style headstock. Few well-known players of the time picked up on the Custom, although Keith Richards (who used one as his main guitar from 1975 until 1983) and Peter Buck in the early years of R.E.M. were fans.

=== Reissues ===
Like the Deluxe, the Custom was subject to renewed interest among guitarists beginning in the 1990s. Fender Japan was the first to release a reissue of the Custom. Following the Japanese re-issue, Fender moved production to its Ensenada facility in Mexico. The higher-end Factory Special Run (FSR) editions of the guitar are made at the U.S.-based Fender Custom Shop. Both the Mexican and the Japanese versions featured a reissued version of the Fender Wide Range humbucking pickup, each of which differs fundamentally in construction from the original and results in a darker-sounding reissue pickup.

In 2010, the Fender Custom Shop released a limited issue of thirty '72 Telecaster Custom relics models, although substantial differences from the original remained. Fender released the American Vintage reissue '72 Telecaster Custom the following year, replicating the original '72 design features such as the three-bolt neck and the classic look, with improved construction and quality.

Squier also has a Telecaster Custom model as part of their Vintage Modified series. It is essentially an affordable hybrid design that takes features from both the Telecaster Custom and Telecaster Deluxe. The Squier Telecaster Custom II uses two Seymour Duncan-designed P-90 pickups instead of humbuckers.
