= Fender Telecaster Deluxe =

Electric guitar

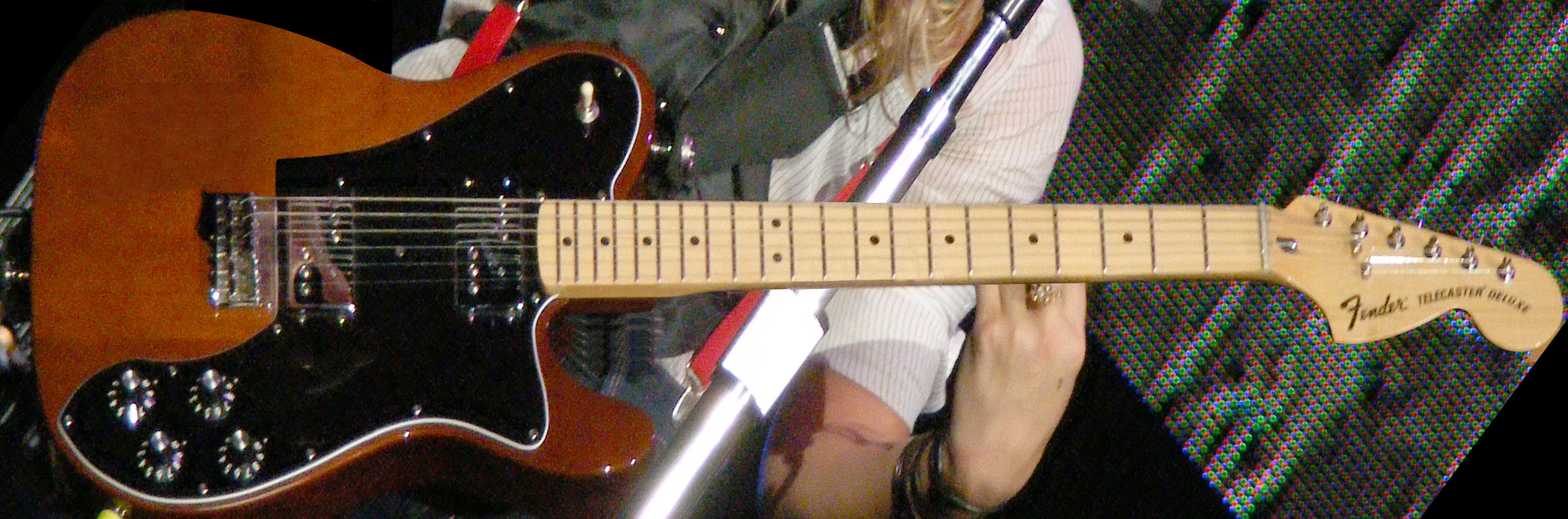
- Manufacturer: Fender
- Period: 1972–1981, 2004–present

Construction
- Body type: Solid
- Neck joint: Bolt-on
- Scale: 25.5"

Woods
- Body: Alder or Ash
- Neck: Maple
- Fretboard: Maple or rosewood

Hardware
- Bridge: Classic Series: Vintage Style Strat Strings-Through-Body Hardtail Bridge Classic Player: Vintage Style Synchronized Tremolo
- Pickup(s): Most commonly 2 Fender Wide Range humbuckers. Other pickup configurations are also available.

Colors available
- Classic Series: Black, 3-Color Sunburst, Walnut, Olympic White (FSR) Other colors may be available

The Fender Telecaster Deluxe is a solid-body electric guitar originally produced by Fender from 1972 to 1981. Designed to compete with Gibson's Les Paul as rock music grew heavier in the 1970s, the Deluxe differs from most Telecaster models by featuring two humbucker pickups, each with its own volume and tone controls, and a larger pickguard. The Deluxe failed to find an audience during its initial production run, but it became popular beginning in the 1990s among rock guitarists, especially in Britpop and indie, and Fender resumed production in 2004.

== History ==
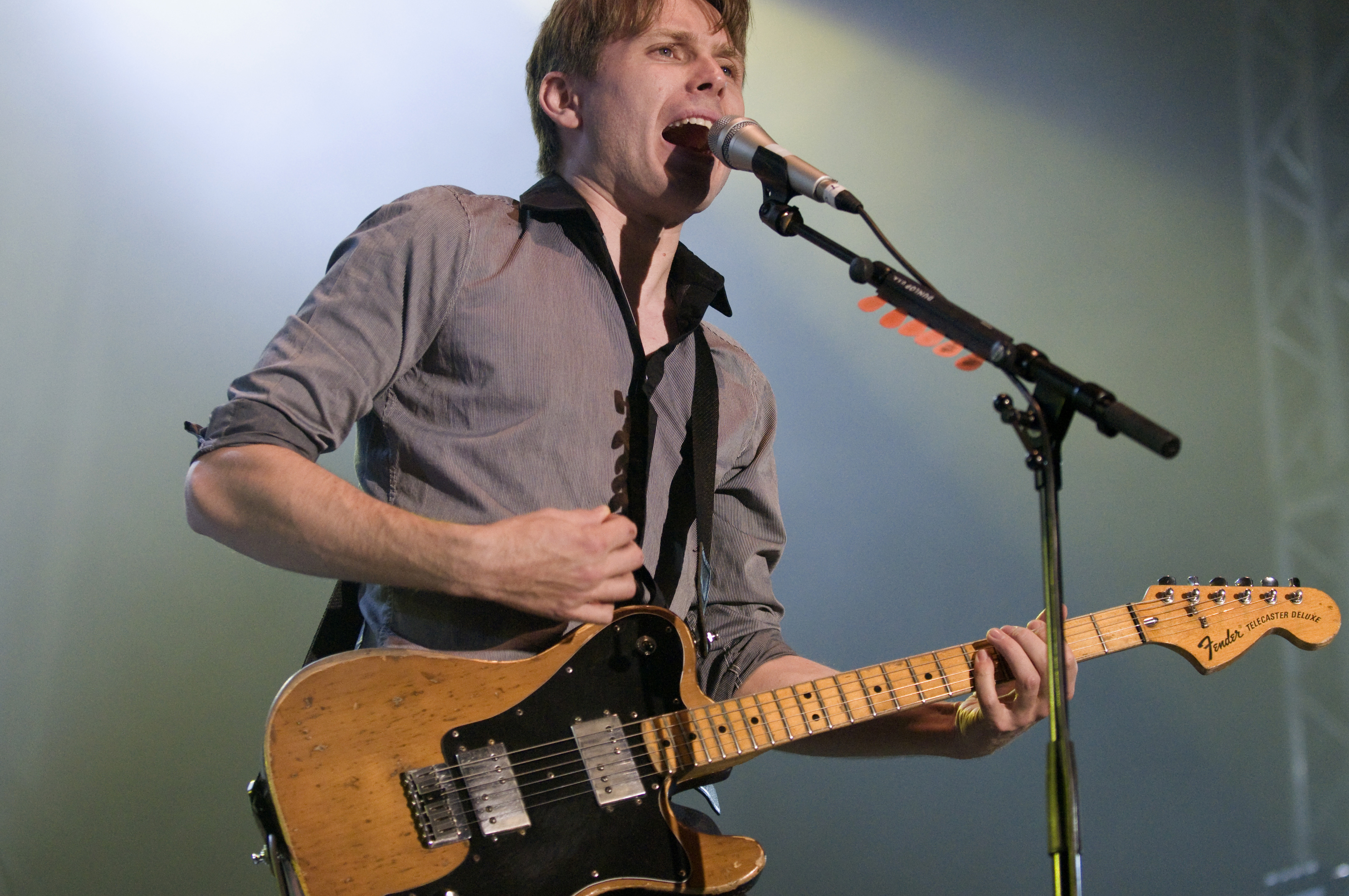
Alex Kapranos of Franz Ferdinand playing a Telecaster Deluxe.

The popularity of hard rock in the late 1960s led Fender to re-think its strategy of exclusively using single coil guitar pickups, as they were not perceived as being suitable for the thick sound and extended sustain favored by heavier rock guitarists using double-coil "humbucking" pickups. Consequently, Fender hired former Gibson employee Seth Lover, the inventor of the P.A.F., to design what would become the Wide Range humbucker, which debuted in 1971 in the semi-hollowbody Thinline Telecaster model. The solidbody Deluxe launched the following year alongside the revamped Telecaster Custom, the latter of which now featured a Wide Range humbucker in the neck and a single-coil in the bridge position, compared to the Deluxe's pair of Wide Ranges.

These humbucker-equipped Telecasters, however, failed to draw many customers away from competition like Gibson's Les Paul model, and the Telecaster Deluxe was discontinued in 1981. By the 1990s, though, the model found popularity with a new generation of guitarists, including Thom Yorke of Radiohead, Graham Coxon of Blur, Noel Gallagher of Oasis, Richey Edwards of Manic Street Preachers, and James Iha of The Smashing Pumpkins, and Fender subsequently released multiple reissue models beginning in the 2000s. The first such model was the brand's "'72 Telecaster Deluxe" reissue, which was followed by models across a variety of Fender's guitar lines, including Classic Player and American Professional, with Squier also offering budget versions.

In 2022, Fender released the "American Vintage II 1975 Telecaster Deluxe", which was the first Deluxe model to be manufactured in the United States since the original production run—previous reissues had been made in Mexico or Japan. The Vintage II Deluxe also saw the return of vintage-spec Wide Range humbuckers, which had been discontinued in 1979 and replaced by more traditional humbucker designs.

Multiple signature models based on the Telecaster Deluxe have been made by Fender, including for Deryck Whibley of Sum 41, John 5, Christone "Kingfish" Ingram, and Chris Shiflett of the Foo Fighters.

== Features ==
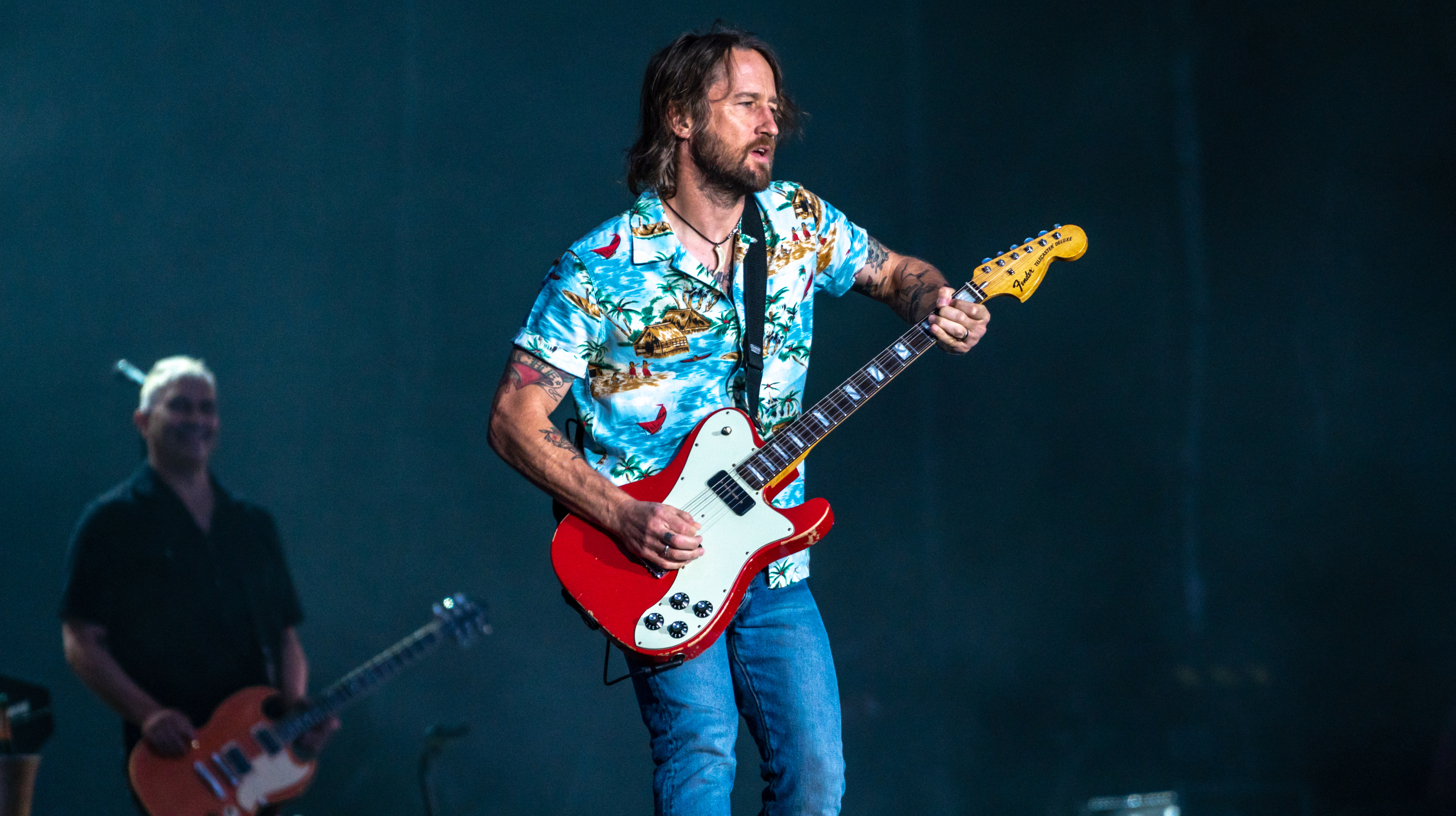
Chris Shiflett of the Foo Fighters playing a customized Telecaster Deluxe.

Designed to compete with the Les Paul, the Telecaster Deluxe features several design similarities with Gibson's competing guitar model, including the use of two humbucker pickups, separate tone and volume controls for each pickup, and a three-position pickup-selector toggle switch on the upper bout. The Deluxe also shares some features with Stratocasters of the same period, including the "CBS-era" wide headstock, a belly cut contour, and initially a tremolo bridge, although this would be replaced by a six-saddle "hardtail" fixed bridge in 1974. The volume/tone knobs used on the early Deluxes were similar to those used on Fender's "Blackface"/"Silverface" range of amplifiers; however, in the late 1970s, these were replaced with black knobs identical to those used on Stratocasters. The original Deluxe had only a maple fretboard option. Other changes Fender made with the Telecaster Deluxe was using a 9 1/2" radius fretboard and medium-jumbo frets, making it easier to play than previous Fender guitars that feature 7 1/4" radius necks and vintage frets.

The Deluxe's two humbuckers were Seth Lover-designed Wide Range pickups, which eschewed traditional bar magnets used in other humbuckers in favor of individually-threaded "CuNiFe" (Copper/Nickel/Ferrite) magnets that could be adjusted individually to "EQ" each string. This design yielded a brighter and clearer sound with less compression than other humbuckers. They were wound with approximately 10,000 turns of polysol wire, yielding a DC resistance of approximately 10.6 kΩ (compared to a standard Gibson P.A.F. humbucker typical DC resistance of 9 kΩ). For later reissues, the Wide Range pickups were replaced by humbuckers using alnico or ceramic magnets in a more typical humbucker design.

== See also ==
- List of Telecaster players
