= Squier '51 =

Electric guitar

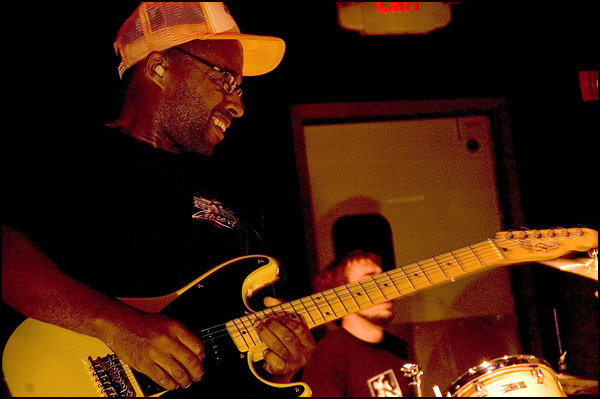
- Squier '51 played by Chuck Treece
- Manufacturer: Squier, Fender
- Period: 2003–2006 (Squier); 2011–2013 (Fender); 2013–2016 (Squier)

Construction
- Body type: Solid
- Neck joint: Bolt-on neck
- Scale: 25.5"

Woods
- Body: Basswood
- Neck: Maple
- Fretboard: Maple

Hardware
- Bridge: Fixed
- Pickup(s): 1 Single-coil, 1 Humbucker with coil split

Colors available
- Black (Fender and 2004 - 2006 Squier only), Vintage Blonde, 2- Tone Sunburst, Candy Apple Red (2013)

The Squier '51 is an electric guitar made by Squier, a brand of Fender. The '51 is notable for being one of the few original designs made by Squier, which normally sells budget versions of Fender's popular guitars and bass guitars.

== Construction ==
The '51 combines aspects of several of Fender's best-known instruments. The body outline resembles a standard Fender Stratocaster, while the single-ply plastic pickguard and chrome control plate is reminiscent of early incarnations of the Fender Precision Bass. The neck is essentially that of a Fender Telecaster, with same square heel and peg head designs. The bridge is a top-loaded hardtail plate secured by 5 screws, with 6 cast metal saddles on a 2 1/16" E-to-e spacing.

The '51 uses a humbucker pickup in the bridge position and a single-coil (R≈3.5kΩ) pickup in the neck position. The 4-wire bridge pickup allows for coil splitting by pulling up on the volume control knob to limit the humbucker to single-coil output. The neck pickup is slanted with respect to the strings, better aligning the single-coil pole spacings under narrower spacing of the strings. The lower control knob is a three-position rotary switch, selecting between the neck pickup, neck + humbucker, or humbucker.

The guitar body is basswood 1-9/16" thick (~1/4" thinner than standard Strats), with edge reliefs for forearm & belly, with 2 separate pickup cavities, connected by a drilled passage started from the neck pocket. The pickup-to-switch cavity wire passage is also drilled from the side (as opposed to top routed recesses), leaving the finished top relatively plain and uncluttered under the large pickguard. The production neck and fret board is one piece maple, with peg-head and square heel profile identical to Telecasters, routed from backside for a peghead-accessible truss rod, the slot capped with "skunk-stripe" of darker wood. Rare specimens were constructed from two piece necks, with a maple fingerboard laminated to a maple neck. Birds eye figuring of the neck is not uncommon.

The '51 was polyurethane-coated in three colors: 2-Tone Sunburst, Black, and Vintage Blonde. The blonde model has a cream-yellow hue and typically, a black pick guard. The sunburst and black models have a white pick guard. Although all Squier promotional pictures depict the Vintage Blonde model with a black pickguard, they were manufactured with both black and white pickguards. White pickguards were standard from the beginning of production until October 2004, during which month the color was switched to black until the end of production in January 2007. It has been rumored that the white pickguard was dropped because many seemed to be prone to warping. Because of the much smaller production and relative rarity of the blonde body/white pickguard '51, these have become the most sought-after and highly valued '51s according to many fans.

== Sales ==
The Squier '51 originally sold for around US$150 through most large music retailers and catalog outlets, although various incentives and sales further reduced the sale price at times. In late 2004, several large music chains were selling the '51 for US $99.99, and even as low as $69.99 in Guitar Center and Sam Ash Music stores, as recently as July 2007. Its low price, unique style and exceptional playability & tone makes it very popular with players who like to modify and upgrade their guitar components. The Squier '51 has developed a strong cult following because of its user-friendly neck and unique sound. Today used examples command a higher price than the guitar did when new; as of 2009 original examples in good condition sell for $150–$200 and up. The 2013 reissued version sells for US $199.

== Reissues ==
In spring 2011, Fender introduced its own version of the Squier '51, also called a '51, under a new line of guitars called the Fender Pawn Shop Series. The Fender '51 had a MSRP of US$999 and was initially being advertised at popular online retailers for US$799. By mid-June 2011, the MSRP had risen to US$1,099, although online retailer prices remained unchanged.

Hardware and electronic component differences aside, the configuration of the Fender variant was almost identical to that of the Squier, with the only notable differences being the use of a full thickness Stratocaster alder body instead of a thinner (by approximately one quarter of an inch) basswood body, and a string-through-body hardtail Stratocaster bridge instead of a top-load bridge. The '51's signature features were all retained, including the Telecaster neck and headstock style, the Stratocaster body shape, and the original Precision Bass pickguard and control plate, humbucking bridge and single coil neck pickups, as well as the rotary pickup selector, single volume control with push-pull coil-tap switch, and absent tone control.

The Pawn Shop Series included another new model - the '72 - which was a variation of the '51 that utilized a semi-hollow body, a rosewood fingerboard, dual humbucking pickups and a pickup blend control.

In 2013, Fender discontinued the Pawn Shop '51 and reissued the original Squier '51. The specifications remain unchanged from the original '51 run, with the exception of a string through body and bridge on the reissues. The reissued run is also available in candy apple red, although the black finish did not return.

In 2021, Fender released "Made in Japan Limited Run Fender '51" for Japan market only. This model was sold only at Fender Online Shop and FENDER SHOP in MIKI GAKKI AMERICAMURA. The price was JP¥132,000. Specifications: Vintage-Style Single-Coil Tele pickup (Bridge), Vintage-Style Single-Coil Tele pickup (Neck), Basswood body, Gloss Polyester Finish on body, Gloss Urethane Finish on neck, Maple “U” Shape neck, Maple 9.5” (241 mm) fingerboard, 25.5" (648 mm) scale length, 3-Saddle Vintage-Style Strings-Through-Body Tele® Bridge with Brass Barrel Saddles, 1-Ply Black pickguard, Master Volume and 3-Position Rotary controls, and comes with a Fender gig bag.
