= Seth Lover =

American inventor (1910–1997)

Seth E. Lover (January 1, 1910, in Kalamazoo, Michigan – January 31, 1997, in Garden Grove, California) was a designer of amplifiers and musical instrument electronics and effects. He is most famous for developing the Gibson humbucker or hum-cancelling electric stringed instrument pickup, most often used on the electric guitar.

== Life and career ==
Seth Lover began working with electronics as a child, and continued working with them during and after his first service with the US Army in the 1930s. He then worked in an electronics shop in Kalamazoo, repairing radios and building amplifiers. In the 1940s he worked for Gibson Guitars before joining the service a second time during World War II. During the rest of the 1940s and 1950s, his career fluctuated between working for Gibson and the US Navy. He developed the humbucking pickup for Gibson in 1955, and designed the first fuzztone distortion device, called the Maestro, in 1961. He stayed with Gibson until 1967 when he took a designing job with Fender Musical Instruments. He retired to the Southern California town of Garden Grove.

Lover died on January 31, 1997, at the age of 87 after a brief illness. He was survived by his wife, his two sons, and his three grandchildren.

== Designs with Gibson, Fender, and Seymour Duncan ==
=== With Gibson ===
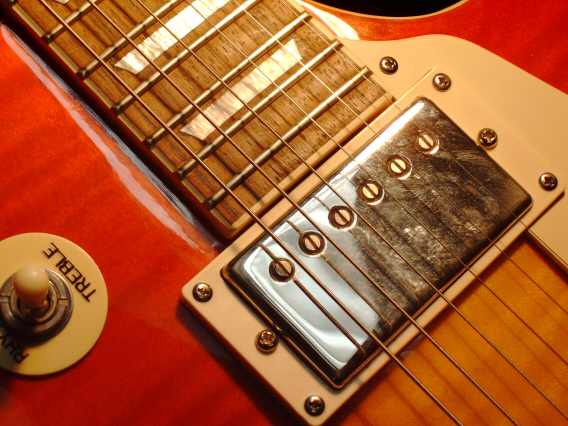
P.A.F. pickup on Gibson Les Paul Standard

Lover's most famous humbucker design was the P.A.F. (Patent Applied For) designed while working for Gibson in 1955. This pickup was utilized in a range of Gibson guitars, most notably the Les Paul model.

Before Lover, electric guitarists were forced to cope with the 60-cycle hum received by single coil pickups. It was in the mid-'50s, while working as an amplifier designer at Gibson Guitars, that Lover figured out how to wire two coils electrically out of phase and with reversed magnetic polarities. The effect was to cancel the hum before it reached the amp and the result was the birth of the humbucking pickup.

Lover applied for the patent on the humbucking pickup in 1955 and it was finally granted in 1959 (U.S. patent 2,896,491). During this five-year period, Gibson adhered a "Patent Applied For" sticker to the underside of their humbucker pickups. These "P.A.F." pickups are among the most collectable and desirable pickups today, fetching upwards of $1,000 each among vintage guitar collectors.

While working under Ted McCarty at Gibson, Lover was also involved in guitar design. He liked to tell how he helped contribute to the design of the famous "Flying V." Lover said that he thought up the design as a way to lean the guitar against a wall without it tipping over.

Lover worked for Gibson from 1952 to 1967 as a design engineer.

=== With Fender ===
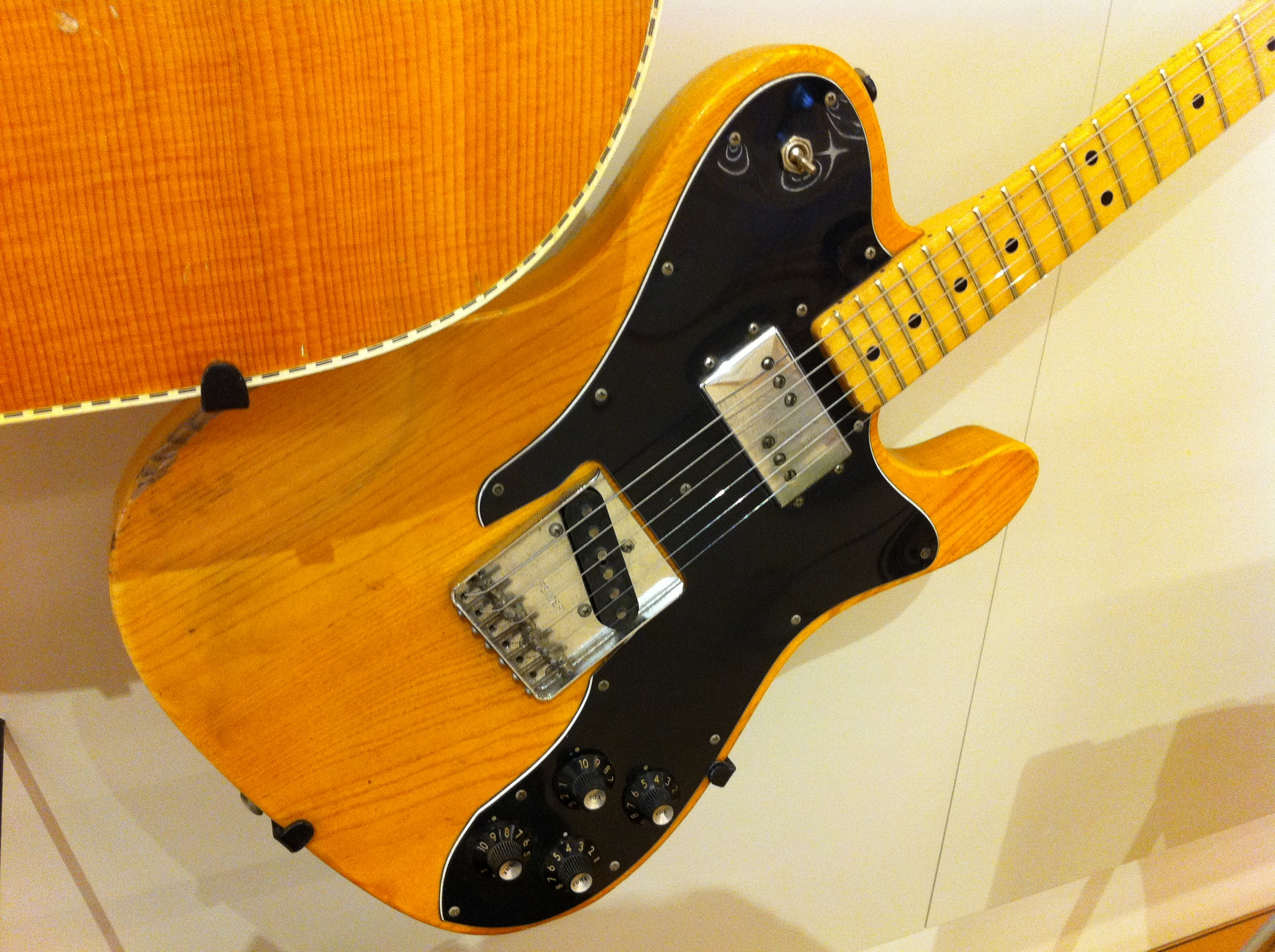
Fender Wide Range pickup (front) on Fender Telecaster Custom

From 1967 to 1975 Lover worked for Fender Musical Instruments as a project engineer. He authored three patents during that time: two for loudspeaker cabinets and one for an electric piano pickup.

Lover designed the Fender Wide Range humbucking pickup (WRHP), which was used in the three Telecaster models (Deluxe, Custom, and Thinline) produced by Fender in the 1960–1970s. The Wide Range pickup was also used in the Fender Starcaster.

=== With Seymour Duncan ===
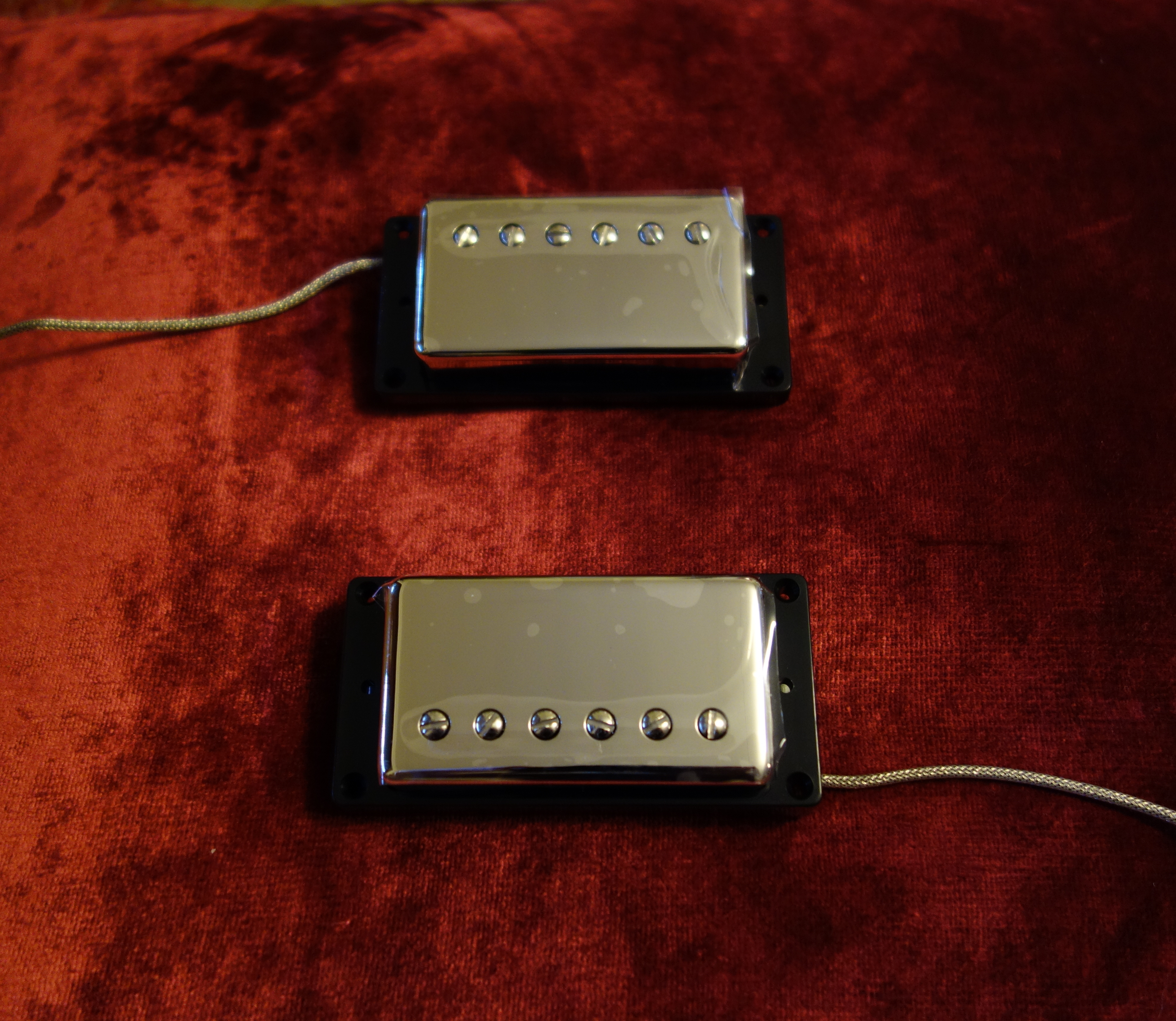
Seymour Duncan SH-55 Seth Lover humbuckers

Seymour W. Duncan, a guitar pickup designer and manufacturer, considered Lover his "humbucker mentor". The two were associated for nearly 20 years. In 1994, Duncan and Lover jointly produced the Seth Lover Model pickup, a re-creation of the "Patent Applied For" humbucker. After numerous full-page ads, NAMM Show appearances, and magazine interviews, Lover became a minor celebrity at age 84. During his final years, Lover was a regular member of the Seymour Duncan NAMM-team.
