= Fender Wide Range =

Electric guitar pickup

Fender Wide Range Humbucker
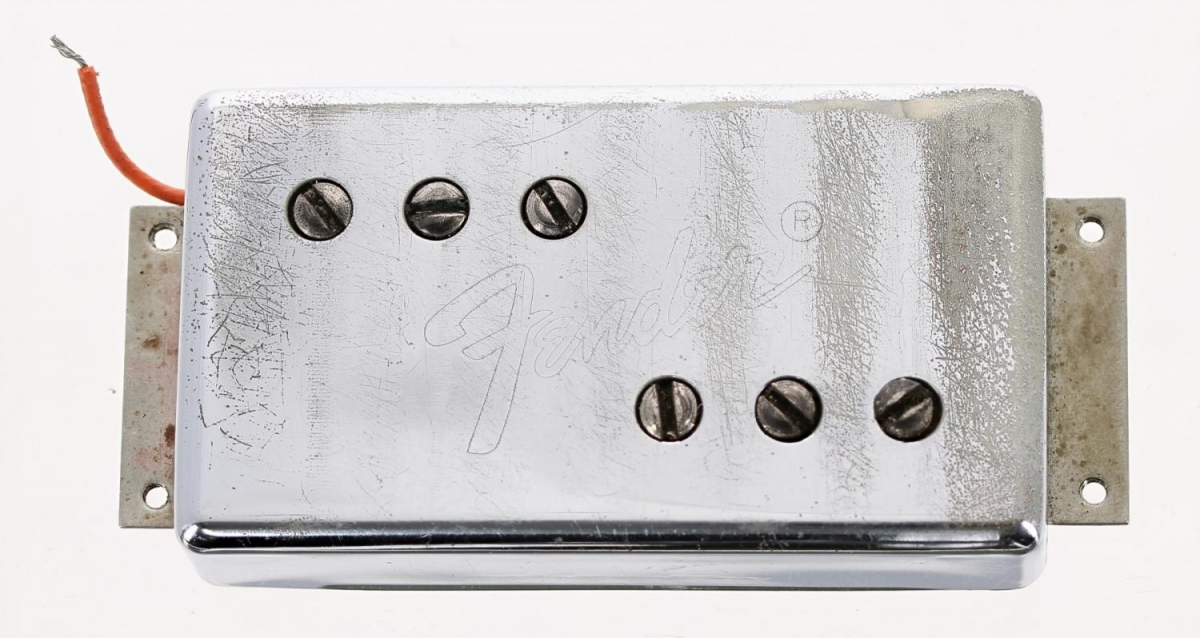
- Fender Wide Range pickup
- Manufacturer: Fender
- Period: 1971–1979 (original); 1983–present (Japan reissue); 1998–present (Mexican reissue); 2020–present (American reissue)
- Type: Passive humbucker
- Magnet type: CuNiFe – (original, American RI), ceramic – (Japanese RI), AlNiCo – (Mexican RI, Ranaldo model RI)

Output specifications
- Voltage (RMS), V: 211.9 mV at 7.135 kHz resonant frequency
- Impedance, kΩ: 602 kΩ at 7.135 kHz resonant frequency

Sonic qualities
- Resonant frequency, Hz: 7.135 kHz

The Fender Wide Range Humbucker is a humbucker guitar pickup, designed by Seth Lover for Fender in the early 1970s. This pickup was intended to break Fender's image as a "single coil guitar company," and to gain a foothold in the humbucker guitar market dominated by Gibson.

The pickups enjoyed some adoption, though Fender's single-coil pickups retained widespread popularity. Original Wide Range pickups were available from 1971 and subsequently installed in the Deluxe, Custom and Thinline Telecasters as well as the Starcaster, ceasing production successively in 1979 when these models were discontinued. Fender Japan was the first to introduce a reissue in 1983, followed by the Made in Mexico version around 1998. The Wide Range Pickup found on American-made Fender guitars is the Mexican-made model introduced in 1998. All reissues differed from the original Seth Lover design in construction and sound until 2020, when Fender began manufacturing the pickup with the original materials again. The company also produced a variation of the pickup for bass guitar from 1971 to 1979.

== Construction ==
The Wide Range pickup was conceived to be sonically closer to Fender's single coil pickups than Gibson humbuckers. Fender's single coils use six magnetized pole pieces sitting vertically, while Gibson's humbuckers use a long bar magnet at the pickup's base with six metal slug pole pieces screwed vertically into a base plate. Fender could not, however, replace the Humbucker's slugs with screws. Due to the difficulty of machining alnico magnets into screw-type pole pieces, this concept called for the use of the more easily machinable CuNiFe (Copper/Nickel/Iron) rod magnets as pole pieces within the coil structures; functioning more like a regular single coil pickup than a Gibson humbucker.

Because CuNiFe pole piece magnets produce less output than a standard humbucker's bar magnet and slugs, the wide-range Humbucker requires more winds of wire to produce an output compatible with Standard Humbuckers. The pickup bobbins were wound with approximately 6200 to 6800 turns of 42-awg poly-insulated copper wire around the pole pieces. As a result, the Wide Range pickup has a DC resistance of around 10.6 kΩ. These extra winds mean the wide-range Humbucker needs a larger casing than standard Humbuckers.

There are three reissues of the wide range pickup using two designs: one manufactured in Japan using ceramic magnets and one in Mexico using alnico. Despite an almost identical appearance to the original 1970s unit, both are regular Humbuckers in large cases, surrounded by wax to take up space and prevent resonant feedback.

The current Mexican reissues, much like a Gibson humbucker, feature a bar magnet underneath the bobbins that abuts six screw-type pole-pieces in each coil; they are conventional humbuckers placed in the larger "wide range" humbucker casing, and the gap is filled with wax. Although neither pickup precisely replicates the sound of the original, they are tonally similar. The Japanese reissue does, however, sound hotter, and the Mexican reissue sounds more like a standard Gibson humbucker. A more recent reissue, currently exclusive to the Lee Ranaldo signature Jazzmaster, has been "re-voiced" to Ranaldo's specifications but appears to be constructed similarly to the Mexican reissue.

In the 1970s, the Fender Wide Range was wired using a 1M audio volume and tone pots. Using 1M pots resulted in an open and bright sound. Modern reissues are commonly wired using 250K volume and tone pots, resulting in a more choked and muddy sound, cutting high frequencies to ground.

In 2020, Fender began producing Wide Range pickups with Cunife magnets for the first time since the 1970s.

== Sound ==
Original Wide Range pickups are described as sounding "fat" but with improved clarity and detail over Gibson humbuckers of the same period. Combined with a bridge single-coil pickup on a Telecaster, it produces a smooth, warm, yet biting sound. Famous users include Keith Richards of The Rolling Stones, Graham Coxon of Blur, Wes Borland of Limp Bizkit/Black Light Burns, Rich Robinson of the Black Crowes, Ryan Adams, Win Butler of Arcade Fire, Alex Kapranos of Franz Ferdinand, Lúcio Maia of Nação Zumbi, Roy Buchanan, Billy Gibbons of ZZ Top, Thom Yorke and Jonny Greenwood of Radiohead, Felix Rodriguez from The Sounds, singer-songwriter Kim Ralls, Chris Shiflett of Foo Fighters, The Edge of U2, Jonny Buckland of Coldplay, Leo Nocentelli of The Meters and Tab Benoit as well as Lee Ranaldo of Sonic Youth's modified "Jazzblasters" which featured Wide Range pickups on modified Fender Jazzmaster guitars.
