= Cunife =

Cunife is an alloy of copper (Cu), nickel (Ni), iron (Fe), and in some cases cobalt (Co). The alloy has the same linear coefficient of expansion as certain types of glass, and thus makes an ideal material for the lead out wires in light bulbs and thermionic valves. Fernico exhibits a similar property. It is a magnetic alloy and can be used for making magnets.

Cunife has a magnetic coercivity of several hundred oersteds. Unlike most high coercivity magnetic materials which are hard and brittle and need to be cast into shape, cunife can be drawn into thin wires. Wires as thin as five thou can be produced this way. Thicker rods of the material can be threaded which is also something that is not possible with the more commonly used magnetic materials.

In the early 1970s, Fender Musical Instruments Corporation used Cunife magnets in their Wide Range humbucker pickups, however they discontinued use, due to Cunife being hard to source. Fender began producing cunife pickups again in 2020.

Cunife alloys are of interest in the discipline of materials science because they are a class of spinodal alloy, i.e. an alloy which undergoes spinodal decomposition during annealing. It is also established that the application of a magnetic field during the annealing process can alter this phase transition, affecting the elemental redistribution and resulting microstructure.

== Typical compositions ==
Given in weight %

| | Cu | Ni | Fe | Co |
|---|---|---|---|---|
| Cunife 1 | 60% | 20% | 20% | - |
| Cunife 2 | 60% | 20% | 17.5% | 2.5% |
