= Fender Telecaster Thinline =

Guitar

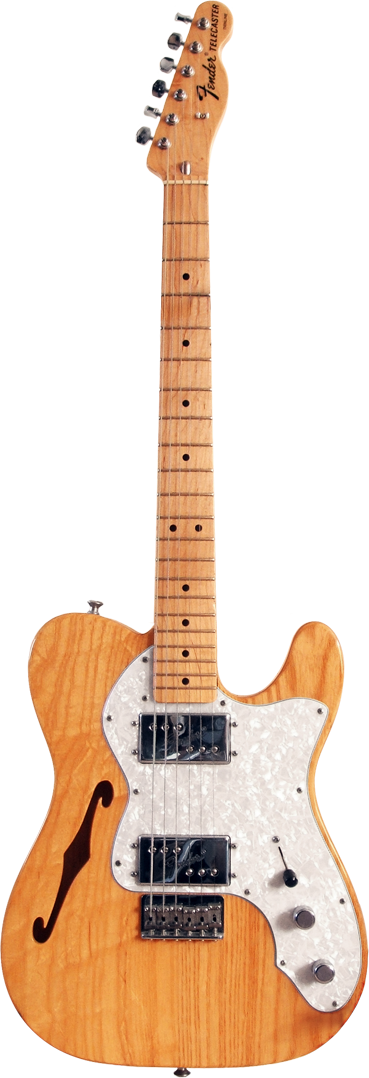
- Manufacturer: Fender
- Period: 1969–1979, 1986–1998, 2000–present

Construction
- Body type: Semi-hollow
- Neck joint: Bolt-on
- Scale: 25.5"

Woods
- Body: Alder; Ash; Mahogany
- Neck: Maple
- Fretboard: Maple

Hardware
- Bridge: Vintage Style Strat Strings-Through-Body Hardtail Bridge
- Pickup(s): 2 Fender Wide Range humbuckers (1972–1981, subsequently reissued); 2 single-coil pickups (1969–1972, subsequently reissued); 2 P-90 pickups (Modern Player version)

The Fender Telecaster Thinline is a semi-hollow guitar made by the Fender company. It is a Telecaster with body cavities. Designed by German luthier Roger Rossmeisl in 1968, it was introduced in 1969 and updated in 1972 by replacing the standard Telecaster pickups with a pair of Fender Wide Range humbucking pickups, bullet truss-rod and 3-bolt neck.

The design was originally an attempt to reduce the weight of the solid-body Telecaster guitar, which had become ever heavier throughout the 1960s due to the dwindling supply of the light ash wood Fender had formerly used. The f-hole and reshaped pickguard are the most apparent visual clues to its construction.

There have been many different versions of the Telecaster Thinline over the years, although the original two are more recognizable. The 1969 version has two standard single-coil pickups and a mahogany body, while the 1972 version, based on the Fender Telecaster Deluxe, has two Fender Wide Range humbucking pickups and a natural swamp ash body. Thinline versions have been made in Mexico and Japan as a part of the Classic Series of guitars and basses, followed by higher-end American-made Factory Special Run (FSR) versions from the Fender Custom Shop in 2005 and 2013.

The Modern Player Telecaster Thinline design was produced in China and featured P-90 pickups and a mahogany body. While it retained the "Fender Telecaster" name on the headstock, it was not labeled as a Thinline, although the F-hole design and hollow construction makes its heritage obvious.

== Squier Thinline Telecasters ==
Fender Telecaster Thinline – 1969
- Manufacturer: Fender
- Period: 1968–1972, 2004–present

Construction
- Body type: Semi-hollow
- Neck joint: Bolt-on neck
- Scale: 25.5"

Woods
- Body: Ash, alder, mahogany, poplar
- Neck: Maple
- Fretboard: Maple

Hardware
- Bridge: Fixed through-body hardtail bridge
- Pickup(s): 2 single-coil, 2 Fender Wide Range humbuckers, 1 Fender Wide Range humbucker (neck) and 1 single-coil (bridge)

Fender's subsidiary company Squier also makes entry level Thinline Telecasters. This includes the Master Series Thinline Telecaster, the Vintage Modified Series Thinline Telecaster, and the Classic Vibe Thinline Telecaster. The Master Series features twin Duncan Designed P-90 style single coil pickups, 2 volume and 2 tone controls and a 3-position toggle switch. The Vintage Modified Series is more traditional, based around the '69 Fender Thinline, featuring 2 Duncan Designed single coil pickups, 1 volume and 1 tone control with a 3-position toggle switch. The Classic Vibe Thinline Telecaster is also based on the '69 Fender Thinline, but features a mahogany body, and Alnico V single coil pickups. However, in a break from the usual Fender standard, the master series and Vintage Modified Thinline Telecasters both feature the more Gibson-esque shorter 24.75" scale where Fender uses a 25.5" scale.
