= Fender (company) =

American musical instrument manufacturer

Coordinates: 33.6460322°N 111.899058°W

Fender Musical Instruments Corporation
- Formerly: Fender Electric Instrument Manufacturing Company
- Type: Private
- Industry: Musical instruments
- Founded: 1946; 80 years ago in Fullerton, California, U.S.
- Founder: Clarence Leonidas Fender
- Headquarters: Los Angeles, California, U.S.
- Area served: Worldwide
- Key people: Edward "Bud" Cole (CEO) Justin Norvell (President, Americas); Aarash Darroodi (CLO)
- Products: Current: Electric, acoustic, & classical guitars, acoustic and electric basses, ukuleles, harmonicas, amplifiers, effects units
- Brands: Bigsby; Charvel; EVH; Gretsch; Jackson; PreSonus; Squier
- Owner: Servco Pacific
- Divisions: Custom Shop
- Website: fender.com

The Fender Musical Instruments Corporation (FMIC, or simply Fender) is an American manufacturer of musical instruments best known for its role in popularizing solid-body electric guitars and basses and their associated amplifiers.

Clarence Leonidas "Leo" Fender founded his namesake company in Fullerton, California in 1946 after parting ways with former business partner Doc Kauffman to pursue designing and manufacturing electric guitars and amplifiers. Fender had early successes with amps like the Deluxe and Princeton, which were followed by the industry's first commercially successful solid-body electric guitar and bass, the Telecaster and Precision Bass, respectively. The influential Stratocaster followed, as did the Jazzmaster and Jaguar guitars and Jazz Bass. Other notable amplifiers released by Fender include the Bassman, Twin, and Vibrasonic. Leo Fender sold his company in 1965 and it has since changed ownership multiple times. Many influential guitarists and bassists are closely associated with Fender's instruments, including Jimi Hendrix, Eric Clapton, David Gilmour, Stevie Ray Vaughan, and Kurt Cobain.

Fender also manufactures acoustic and classical guitars, as well as ukuleles, and owns a number of subsidiary companies like Squier, Charvel, Gretsch, and Jackson.

== History ==
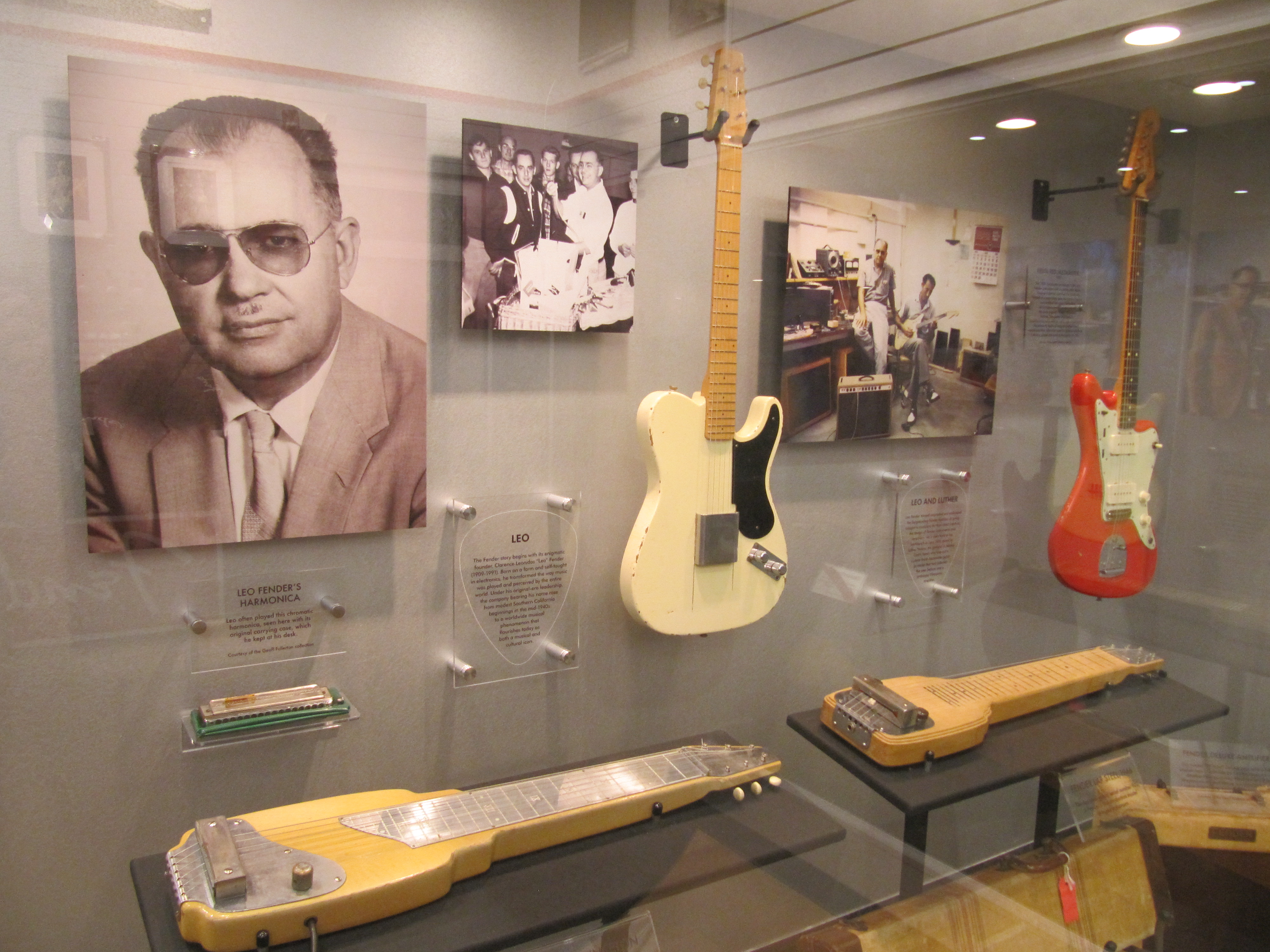
Leo Fender and several of his early guitar models at the Fender Guitar Factory Museum.

=== Origins ===
The company began as "Fender's Radio Service" in late 1938, in Fullerton, California. As a qualified electronics technician, Leo Fender had repaired radios, phonographs, home audio amplifiers, public address systems and musical instrument amplifiers. He became intrigued by design flaws in contemporary musical instrument amplifiers and began building amplifiers based on his own designs or modifications to existing designs.

By the early 1940s, Leo Fender had entered into a partnership with Clayton Orr "Doc" Kauffman, and they formed the K & F Manufacturing Corp to design, manufacture, and market electric instruments and amplifiers. Doc Kauffman's experience in the industry had great value for Leo. During the 1930's Doc Kauffman had assisted George Beauchamp & Rickenbacker in developing the Lap Steel A-22 Frying Pan, as well the Electro-Spanish Ken Roberts the first full-scale electric guitar. A scale length, which Fender would continue forth. Production began in 1945 with Fender's first stringed instrument design, a Hawaiian lap steel guitar encompassed with a patented pickup and accompanying amplifier. By the end of the year, Fender became convinced that manufacturing was more profitable than repair and decided to concentrate on that business instead. Kauffman remained unconvinced, and he and Fender amicably parted ways in 1946. Fender then renamed the company the "Fender Electric Instrument Company".

The brand's first official guitar design came in spring of 1950 with the release of the Esquire, which came with both single- and double-pickup options. However, as the Esquire's one-piece maple neck proved susceptible to bowing in high humidity, a truss rod was added and the model was renamed the "Broadcaster", and later the "Telecaster" after a trademark dispute with Gretsch. The Telecaster's bolted-on neck allowed for the instrument's body and neck to be milled and finished separately, and for the final assembling to be done quickly and cheaply by unskilled workers. The "Tele" was the first mass-produced solid-body electric guitar. Following the success of the Telecaster, Fender debuted the world's first electric bass, the Precision Bass, in 1951, alongside the first-ever bass amp, the Bassman.

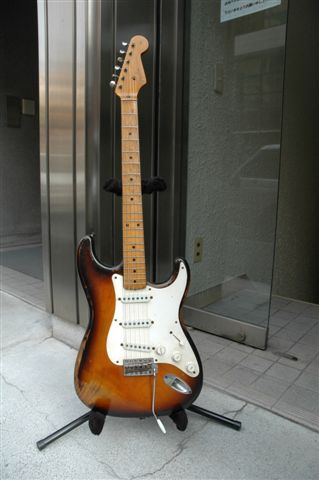
The Stratocaster was released in 1954

In August 1954, Fender unveiled the Stratocaster electric guitar. The "now-iconic" Strat differed significantly from the Telecaster's design in several ways, such as using three pickups, a spring-tension vibrato bridge, and a contoured body shape. Following the Stratocaster's release, the Precision Bass received a major makeover, aligning its design more with the Stratocaster, as opposed to the Telecaster. In 1959, Fender released the Jazzmaster guitar. Like the Stratocaster before it, the Jazzmaster was a radical departure from previous guitar designs, with an offset body, new vibrato system, and innovative electronics that were designed to (unsuccessfully) capture the Jazz guitar market. The Jazz Bass followed in 1960, with the Jaguar released in 1962 and Mustang in 1964, completing Fender's "classic" instrument lineup. Fender began producing acoustic guitars in 1964, as well.

=== Sale to CBS ===
In January 1965, Leo Fender sold his companies to the Columbia Records Distribution Corporation, a subsidiary of the Columbia Broadcasting System (CBS), for $13 million ($133 million in 2025 adjusted for inflation). As Fender later explained, "In 1964 Leo found himself with 17 buildings, about 600 employees, and a back order of $9 million in guitars and amps. The overwhelming demands of the company coupled with his often debilitating illness forced him to sell the company to CBS in 1965." Fender's "CBS-era" saw several notable changes implemented, such as a redesigned oversized headstock (1965), bound fretboards with block inlays (1966), and a three-bolt neck joint (1971).

The company introduced new instrument and amplifier designs during this time, as well. The Starcaster, for one, was unusual because of its shallow semi-hollow body design that still retained the traditional Fender bolt-on neck with a new headstock design. The Starcaster also incorporated a new humbucking pickup by P.A.F. designer Seth Lover, the Wide Range pickup. This pickup was installed in three new incarnations of the Telecaster: the Telecaster Custom, the Telecaster Deluxe, and the Telecaster Thinline.

In 1966, Fender opened a much larger facility at 1300 S. Valencia Drive adjacent to the existing factory at 500 South Raymond Avenue. Guitar and amplifier production, which had increased 30% in CBS's first year, soon increased another 45%.

Despite the new models and technology, Fender's popularity waned among players due to a perceived decline in quality with CBS' takeover, while so-called "pre-CBS" vintage instruments became highly collectible. To try and restore the brand's reputation, CBS brought in three new executives in 1981: John McLaren, Bill Schultz, and Dan Smith, who had previously worked for Yamaha Musical Instruments. To address quality control issues, the Fender Fullerton plant was shut down for a short time in order to revamp the manufacturing process. Fender was also struggling to fight against lower cost copycat guitars on the market. Production was moved to Japan. On March 11, 1982, Fender Japan Ltd. was founded.

After selling his namesake company, Leo Fender founded Music Man in 1975, and G&L Musical Instruments in 1979, both of which manufacture electric guitars and basses based on his earlier designs.

=== After CBS ===
In 1985, Bill Schultz and a group of investors—including company employees and external companies like Servco Pacific Capitol—purchased Fender from CBS for $12.5 million and renamed it "Fender Musical Instruments Corporation" (FMIC). However, the sale did not include many of the company's patents or the old Fullerton factory, leading to the cessation of U.S. operations that same year. Production of Fender products instead moved to Japan, but their import strategy became untenable in 1987 when the value of the Japanese yen doubled. Fender reintroduced U.S. production in 1987 with the American Standard series via their new Corona, California-based Custom Shop, which would also release the brand's first artist signature series models, both Stratocasters, for Eric Clapton and Yngwie Malmsteen a year later.

In 1987, Fender established a manufacturing facility in Ensenada, Baja California, Mexico, and by 1990 Fender and their Japanese partners FujiGen had started manufacturing in the city. In 1991, FMIC moved its corporate headquarters from its Corona location to Scottsdale, Arizona, and the Ensenada plant took over as Fender's primary export line. The plant was rebuilt in 1994 after a fire. Ownership changed in December 2001, when private equity firm Weston Presidio bought a controlling stake in Fender for $57.8 million. Weston Presidio sought an initial public offering in 2012, but the IPO was withdrawn to poor market conditions. Longtime investor Servco instead bought out Weston Presidio, with TPG Growth as an equal partner. Fender began new measures to attract customers, including implementing direct-to-consumer sales in 2015; the introduction of a digital learning platform, Fender Play, and a practice app, Fender Songs; and creating an eCommerce store in China to capitalize on the country's growing music scene. These initiatives resulted in a 300% increase in revenue. In 2020, Servco bought out TPG Growth's stake, making them Fender's majority owner.

In 2025, Fender's headquarters will move to Phoenix, Arizona.

== Players ==
=== Early players ===
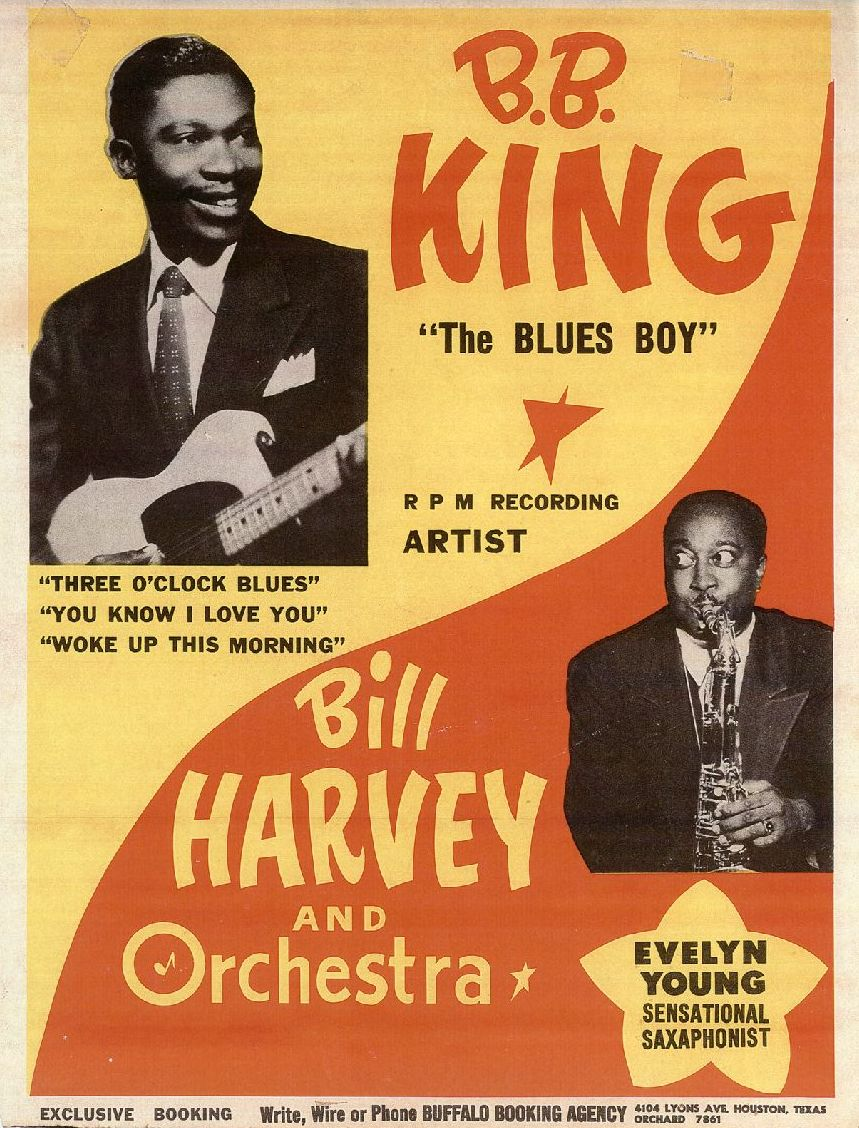
A promotional poster featuring B.B. King with a Fender Esquire.

Fender's products, particularly its electric guitars, have been prominently associated with numerous notable players, often forming a key part of their tones and styles, and being used during significant moments in popular music history. While often associated with the impending rise of rock and roll, Fender's initial models, the Esquire and Telecaster, gained initial popularity in the early 1950s with the Western swing artists that had recently replaced big bands in popularity. Unlike older, East Coast-based manufacturers, Fender's California location, technological innovation, and affordability meshed with the subsequent emergence of U.S. youth culture and up-and-coming genres like rock and roll, rhythm and blues, and country. Johnny Cash's guitarist Luther Perkins adopted the Telecaster in 1954. R&B guitarists like B.B. King and Clarence "Gatemouth" Brown took it up, as well. Dale Hawkins' Top 40 rockabilly hit "Suzie Q" (1957) was anchored by a Telecaster-played riff from James Burton, who later joined Ricky Nelson's band and repeatedly showcased his Telecasters on The Adventures of Ozzie and Harriet throughout the late 1950s and early 1960s. Early rock and roller Buddy Holly was an early proponent of the Telecaster's follow-up, the Stratocaster, famously playing one during a 1957 performance on The Ed Sullivan Show and giving much of the public their first view of this new Fender guitar. During his October 1958 tour of the U.K., Muddy Waters—wielding a Telecaster—shocked audiences expecting "folksy acoustic" music with loud, electrified blues instead. Waters' tour proved a pivotal influence on what would become the next generation of electric guitarists from England.

=== 1960s–1980s ===
Electric guitar-based music continued to increase in popularity into the 1960s, especially among younger musicians. Surf rock icon Dick Dale created his unique sound with a Stratocaster and the brand's amplifiers beginning early in the decade. When Bob Dylan went electric at the 1965 Newport Folk Festival, he was playing a 1964 sunburst-finish Stratocaster. Jimi Hendrix, perhaps the Stratocaster's most well-known player, famously set one on fire at the 1967 Monterey Pop Festival. He also used a Strat during his rendition of "The Star-Spangled Banner" at Woodstock, a performance considered one of the most iconic moments of the 1960s. Despite his later association with the Gibson Les Paul, Jimmy Page was gifted a Telecaster by Jeff Beck and used it on much of his early Led Zeppelin work, including "Stairway to Heaven". His bandmate John Paul Jones played Fender's Jazz Bass model. Outside of rock and blues, session bassist James Jamerson created a distinctive feel and groove with his Precision Bass on numerous Motown records, amassing 23 Billboard Hot 100 number one songs during the 1960s and 1970s.

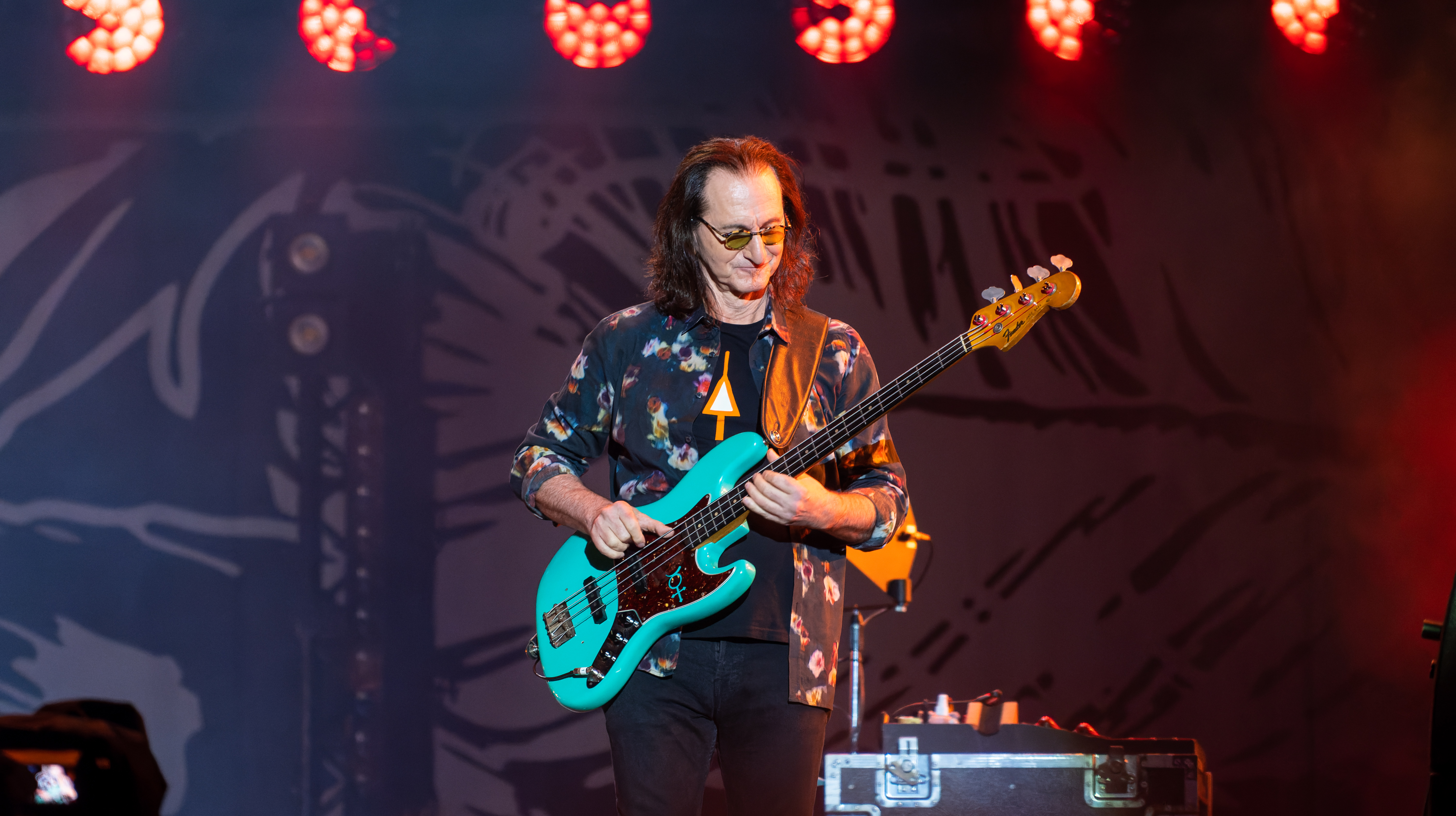
Rush's Geddy Lee is one of the Jazz Bass' most notable players.

David Gilmour of Pink Floyd extensively used a black Stratocaster during the 1970s and 1980s, as did Eric Clapton with his Strat Blackie. A former Gibson player, Clapton had bought his first Fender in 1967. It made its debut in 1970 on his first solo album and was used in concerts with Derek and the Dominos and on the album Layla and Other Assorted Love Songs. That same year, Clapton gifted a butterscotch Telecaster to his friend Keith Richards just as the Rolling Stones were about to record Exile on Main St. Dubbed "Micawber", Richards replaced the neck pickup with a P.A.F. humbucker and it became his primary guitar for much of his career. Heartland rockers like Tom Petty and Bruce Springsteen played Telecasters on many of their hits, with Springsteen using his hollowed-out 1952 Tele, "The Mutt", continuously since 1973. In the world of heavy metal, Steve Harris played a single "P-Bass" across all of Iron Maiden's albums beginning in 1975 with the band's debut.

Although Fender's popularity waned somewhat in the 1980s with the rise of heavier music styles and the "superstrat" era, many noted players continued using the brand's guitars and basses. Andy Summers and Sting scored a string of hits with the Police during this time, with Summers using a heavily-modified Telecaster and Sting playing Precision Basses. Shred virtuoso Yngwie Malmsteen notably stayed loyal to the Stratocaster throughout this era. Stevie Ray Vaughan prominently played Strats throughout his short career, including his favorite, the battered, sunburst Number One.

=== Modern era ===
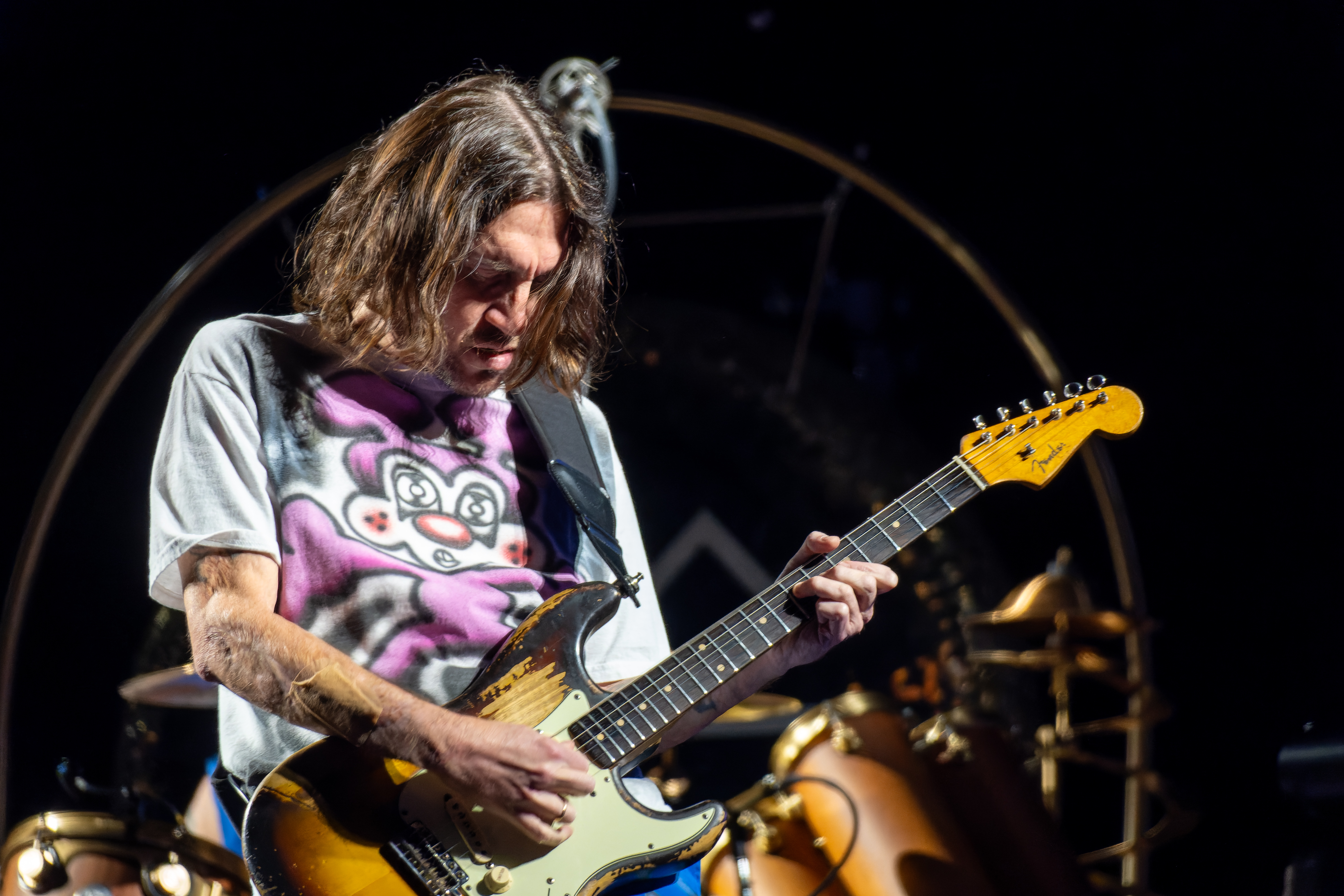
John Frusciante of the Red Hot Chili Peppers playing a Stratocaster.

While the Telecaster and Stratocaster remained popular in the 1990s among players like John Frusciante of the Red Hot Chili Peppers and Mike McCready of Pearl Jam, many grunge and alternative rock players gravitated towards other models. Kurt Cobain used Jaguar and Mustang models in addition to Strats. Thom Yorke of Radiohead has used a Telecaster Deluxe model, while bandmate Jonny Greenwood favors Telecaster models like the relatively uncommon Telecaster Plus. Bassists Mike Dirnt of Green Day and Nate Mendel of the Foo Fighters have crafted their tones with Precision Basses. Flea has favored the Jazz Bass, wielding it as both a rhythm and lead instrument. Other recent players to receive Fender signature guitars include H.E.R. and Cory Wong.

== Logos ==
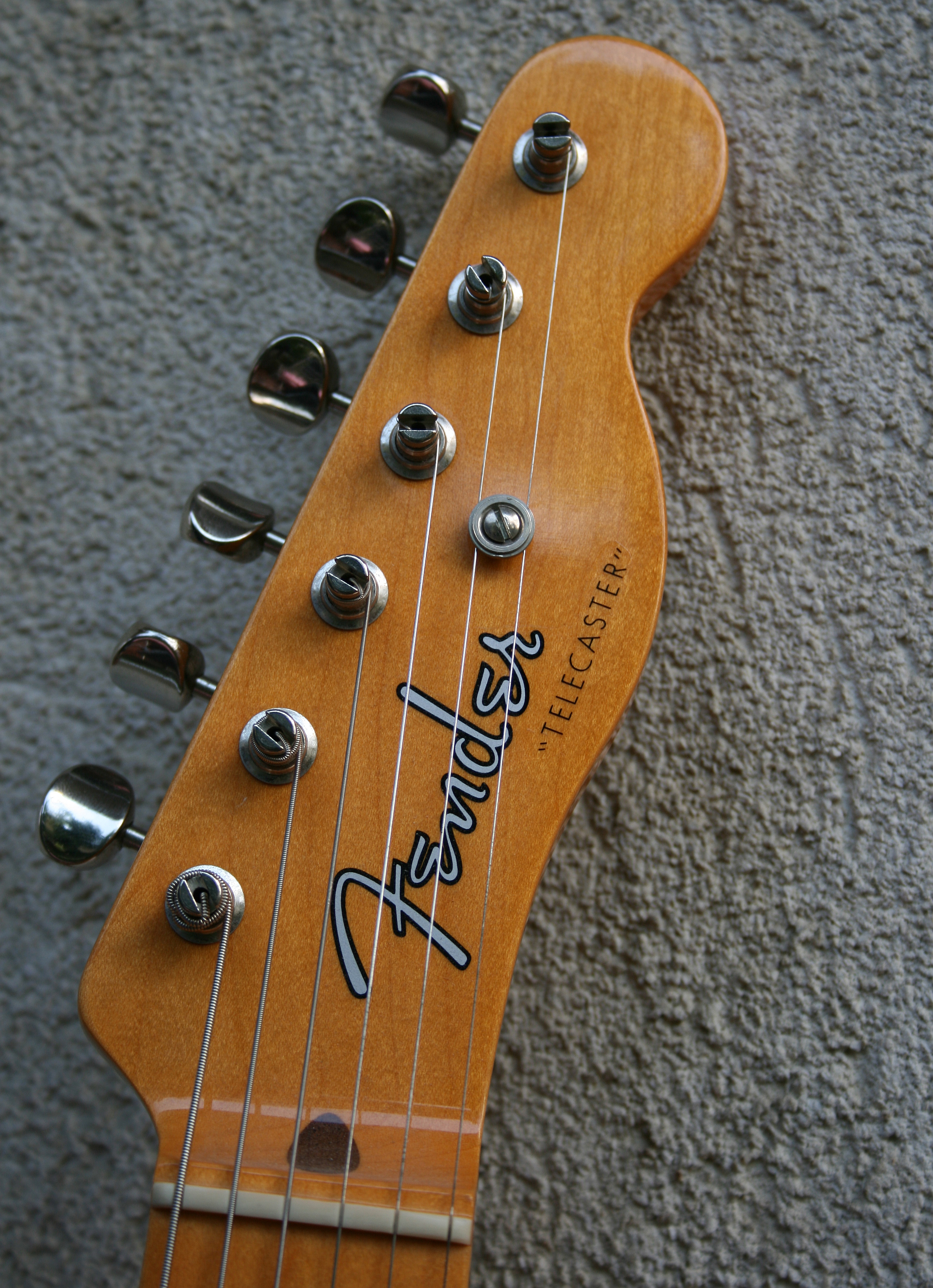
Fender Telecaster with a "spaghetti logo" from the pre-CBS era

The Fender "spaghetti logo" was used by Fender from 1954 to the mid-1960s. By 1965 Fender used a transition logo which was a thicker gold-and-black logo (this logo is associated with CBS).

== Acquisitions and partnerships ==
FMIC has purchased a number of instrument brands and firms, including the Guild Guitar Company, the Sunn Amplifier Company, and SWR Sound Corporation. In early 2003, FMIC reached an agreement with the Gretsch family and began manufacturing and distributing new Gretsch guitars. Fender also owns Jackson, Olympia, Orpheum, Tacoma Guitars, Squier, and Brand X amps.

On October 28, 2007, Fender acquired Kaman Music Corporation, which owned the Ovation Guitar Company, Latin Percussion and Toca hand percussion products, Gibraltar Hardware, Genz Benz Amplification, Charvel, Hamer Guitars, and is the exclusive U.S. sales representative for Sabian Cymbals and exclusive worldwide distributor of Takamine Guitars and Gretsch Drums.

In 2011, Volkswagen partnered with Fender to manufacture premium sound systems for its vehicles in North America. Volkswagen vehicles in North America that offer optional Fender Premium Sound are the Volkswagen Golf, Volkswagen Beetle, Volkswagen Jetta Sedan, Volkswagen Passat, and Volkswagen Tiguan.

In 2014, Fender sold Guild Guitars to Cordoba Music Group.

In February 2015, KMC was sold to Jam Industries by FMIC.

In January 2019, Fender purchased the Bigsby Electric Guitar Company from its partner Gretsch.The subsidiary operates independently, and produces the popular Bigsby vibrato tailpiece as well as several Paul Bigsby-designed electric guitars.

In November 2021, Fender purchased the Louisiana-based PreSonus Audio Electronics, a manufacturer of professional audio equipment and software.

In June 2023, Fender opened its first flagship store in Tokyo, Japan.

In 2024, Fender and Teufel Audio jointly launched a speaker line.

== Litigation ==
In a decision dated December 2025, FMIC won a default judgment in a German copyright infringement case against a Chinese guitar manufacturer, with the Düsseldorf Regional Court finding that the Stratocaster body shape was protected by copyright. In May 2026, FMIC began sending cease and desist letters to several other manufacturers of Stratocaster-style guitars selling their products in the European Union, citing the ruling, with demands including the recall and destruction of all such guitars. This sparked a backlash among the guitar community, with musician Tim Pierce describing it as "brand suicide". Fender has argued the ruling protects "fair competition". One confirmed recipient of a cease-and-desist was PRS Guitars, manufacturer of the popular PRS Silver Sky, a Stratocaster-style guitar that has several notable differences from Fender designs. Another prominent recipient is Yamaha Corporation, whose Pacifica series features some Stratocaster-style designs. Previously, in 2009, Fender had lost a case attempting to assert trademark protection on the Stratocaster body shape in the United States, with a judge noting that this body shape "is so common that it is depicted as a generic electric guitar […] in the 1987 edition of Random House Dictionary of the English Language". On 22 June 2026, Thomann, the largest music retailer in Europe and owner of the Harley Benton brand of guitars, many of which have Stratocaster-style designs, announced it would be pursuing legal action against Fender in response to the cease and desist campaign.

In a September 2026 interview with Bloomberg, CEO Bud Cole stated that Fender was no longer pursuing litigation against "small builders" and was instead focusing on larger manufacturers. Of the backlash Fender received, Cole said, "It's clear to me that this got ahead of us—the legal process got ahead of us—and that we could have done this better." Sixty firms had received cease and desists, according to Bloomberg, and Fender said it was working with 32 of those firms, 18 of which had signed agreements to stop making Stratocaster-style guitars and redo their designs. Some brands that received cease and desists saw an increase in sales after Fender's litigation became public knowledge, with buyers purchasing from these competitors as a form of protest against the actions of Fender.

== Publications ==
=== Fender Frontline ===
Fender published the Fender Frontline magazine as a source of product, artist and technical data for the company's customers. The first half featured interviews and articles about the guitars and the stars who played them, and the second half was a catalog section.

Fender published 27 issues of the magazine from 1990 through 2000. Notable interviewees included Kurt Cobain in Fall 1994, in what was his last interview. Fender had designed a hybrid guitar for Cobain, known as a Jag Stang. Other notable interviews featured Pink Floyd guitarist David Gilmour, Glenn Hughes from Deep Purple, and King Crimson's Adrian Belew.

In 2001, Fender eliminated the interviews and features section, and Frontline became an annual illustrated price list until 2006, when it was replaced with a product guide.

== Products ==
Fender's core product are electric guitars, namely the Jaguar, Jazzmaster, Mustang, Telecaster, Stratocaster, Duo-Sonic, Meteora, and Jag-Stang. This is alongside bass guitars in the Mustang, Jaguar, Jazz, Precision and Meteora models. Fender also manufactures acoustic guitars, lap steel guitars, banjos, electric violins, guitar/bass amplifiers and the Fender Rhodes electric piano (until 1983). In addition, Fender produces effects pedals and picks.

According to American guitar expert George Gruhn, the Fender Telecaster, Precision Bass, and Stratocaster are "three of the most important models in the history of the electric guitar", and were all introduced between 1950 and 1957. In 1953, Fender also introduced the Stringmaster, a double-pickup model which was popular with western swing steel-guitar players.

Fender manufactures and distributes all musical instruments sold under the EVH brand, including Custom Shop models and replicas of the Frankenstrat.

== Squier ==
Squier was a string manufacturer that Fender acquired. Fender has used the Squier brand since 1982 to market inexpensive variants of Fender guitars to compete with Stratocaster copies, as the Stratocaster became more popular. Squier guitars have been manufactured in the United States, Japan, Korea, Indonesia and China.

== Impact and legacy ==
Fender products have become known for their versatility and "clean" sound, and the design of some of the company's guitar models have become iconic, and a part of popular culture. Daryl Robertson of Guitar World wrote in 2023, "Fender is arguably the most well-known guitar manufacturer of all time. Without Leo Fender's influence on the wonderful world of guitars, amplifiers and basses, the landscape of music would look very different – it certainly wouldn't be as colorful." Luke Mitchell of SlashGear wrote in 2023, "Fender amplifiers have defined the sound of blues, rock, and country music, making them a staple for musicians worldwide."

== See also ==
- Music Man
- G&L Musical Instruments
