= Gretsch G6131 =

Electric guitar

- Manufacturer: Gretsch
- Period: 1956–present

Construction
- Body type: Solid
- Neck joint: Set neck

Woods
- Body: Mahogany (often with a maple top); Swamp ash (rare)
- Neck: Usually mahogany Maple
- Fretboard: Usually Rosewood; Ebony; Maple; Richlite

Hardware
- Bridge: Usually Tune-o-matic
- Pickup(s): Usually 2 humbuckers

Colors available
- Various, often sunburst-type finishes Goldtop; Ebony; Alpine White; Wine Red; Silver; Emerald

The Gretsch G6131, popularly known as the Gretsch Jet Firebird, is an electric guitar made by Gretsch. The most popular use of this guitar is by late AC/DC rhythm guitarist Malcolm Young and Crowded House lead singer and Split Enz co-frontman Neil Finn.

== History ==
The G6131 was released shortly after the Duo Jet and Silver Jet were issued. The early Jet Firebirds had two DeArmond single coil pickups and block fret-markers. In the end of the 1950s decade, the guitars had Neo-Classic Thumbnail fret-markers and two Gretsch Filtertron humbucking pickups. In 1962, however, they became double cutaway guitars with gold hardware rather than chrome. Also, instead of the standard vibratos of the earlier age, there were Burns tremolos. Then, in 1968 the Bigsbys were optional with the guitars, and instead of the Filtertrons, there were Super-trons added on it. This lasted until 1971, when Gretsch decided to switch back to the original single cut models.

== Variations ==
There are many different versions of this guitar, such as:

- G6131T — Single cut model with dual Filtertrons; standard model
- G6131TDS — Single cut with DynaSonic pickups
- G6131TVP — Power Jet with dual TV Jones Powertron pickups; with Gretsch tailpiece
- G6131T-TVP — Power Jet with dual TV Jones Powertron pickups; with Bigsby, Only Current Firebird in production as of 2015.
- G6131MY — Signature Model for Malcolm Young with optional single or dual Filtertrons; double cutaway; released in 2008 and reissued in 2017; based on Young’s modified 1963 Jet Firebird
- G6131-1962 — Double Cutaway with two Filtertrons; Discontinued in 1971; Burns vibrato
