= TBRB =

TBRB is an initialism and may refer to:

- The Beatles: Rock Band, a video game
- The Transnational Boxing Rankings Board, a boxing ranking organization
