= Gretsch White Falcon =

1954 electric hollow-body guitar

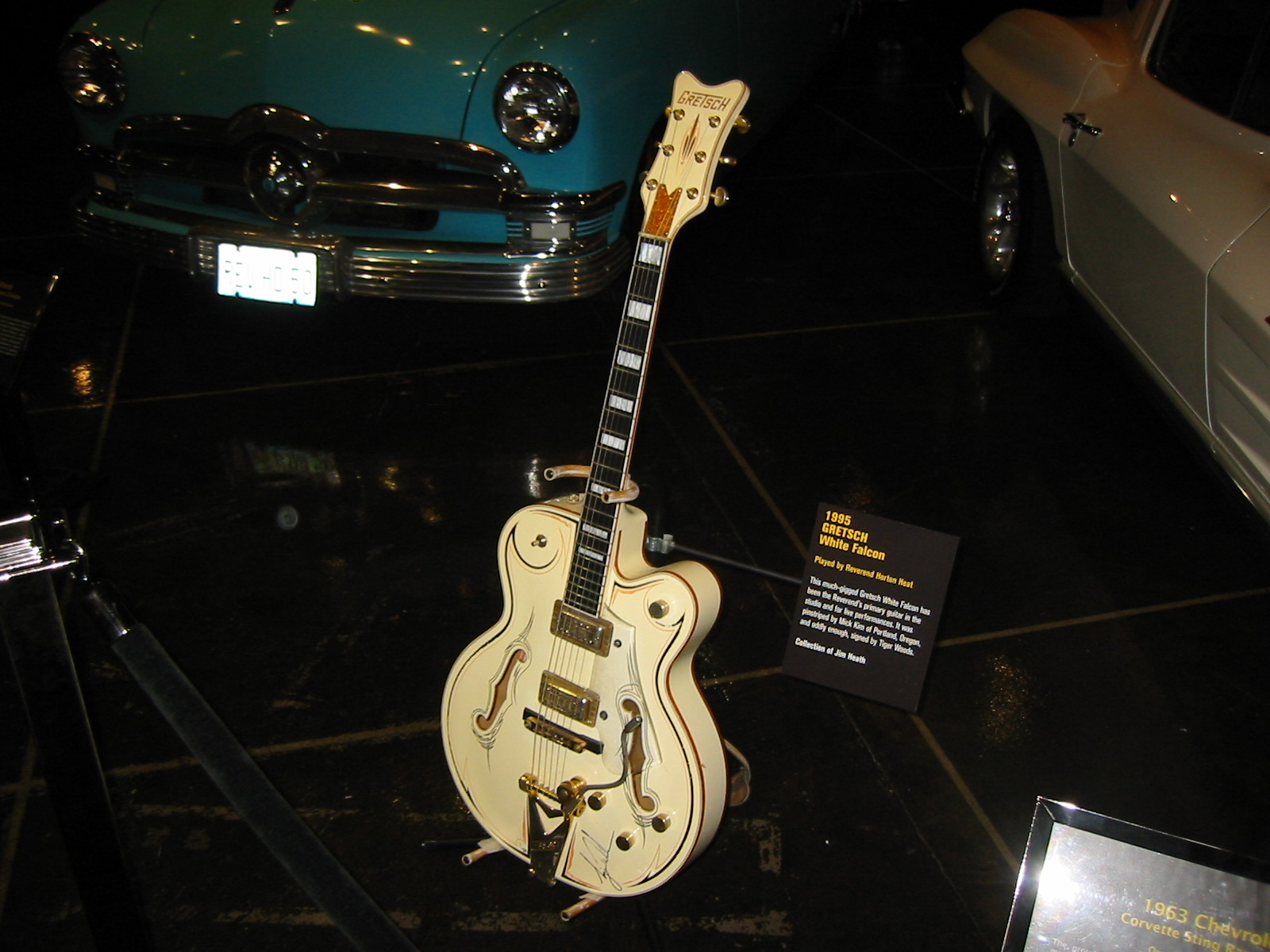
- Manufacturer: Gretsch
- Period: 1955–1980; 1996–Present

Construction
- Body type: Hollow
- Neck joint: Set
- Scale: 25.5"

Woods
- Body: 17" wide, solid spruce archtop, laminated maple back and sides with gold sparkle-white-black-white layered binding, f-holes
- Neck: Maple
- Fretboard: Ebony with pearl inlay and gold sparkle-white-black-white layered bindings; 25½" scale

Hardware
- Bridge: Ebony-based "Space Control" roller bridge (since 1958)
- Pickup(s): Two Dynasonic Single-coil Pickups (1954–1958); two FilterTron Humbuckers (1958–Present)/3-position toggle

Colors available
- White, black, silver

The Gretsch White Falcon is an electric hollow-body guitar introduced in 1954 by Gretsch.

This guitar was created as a "showpiece" to exhibit the craft of Gretsch's luthiers, sales, and demonstration representative, Jimmie Webster, who created it for the 1954 NAMM Convention. The guitar was so popular that it was put into production and went on sale the following year. Since then, it has undergone various changes and is still being made today. As of 2013, Gretsch offers a number of guitars in its "Falcon" series, including a custom-built replica of the original, which is priced in the US at $12,000 (approximately £8300).

The White Falcon's distinctive appearance is owed to its 17-inch width (white, with gold-sparkle pickguard featuring an engraved falcon) and its hardware: Jimmie Webster's 1954 version had triple binding, gold-plated hardware, an ebony fretboard with mother-of-pearl inlays, and an eye-catching "Cadillac G" tailpiece.

== Origins and history ==
In early 1954, Jimmie Webster sought to design a guitar to improve upon the Gibson Super 400. He wanted a "Dream Guitar," and gained his inspiration by walking through the Gretsch factory watching the construction of the many diverse musical instruments the company produced. From the banjo production line, Webster recalled the engraved pearl inlays that adorned the fretboard and headstock. Many of Gretsch's drums were covered with thick sparkly gold plastic that could also be used as binding on guitars.

The White Falcon was unveiled at the NAMM Convention in July 1954. It was displayed as "the guitar of the future," but Gretsch initially had no plans to manufacture the model. It was supposed to be a showpiece, much like GM's Motorama "Dream Cars" of the day.

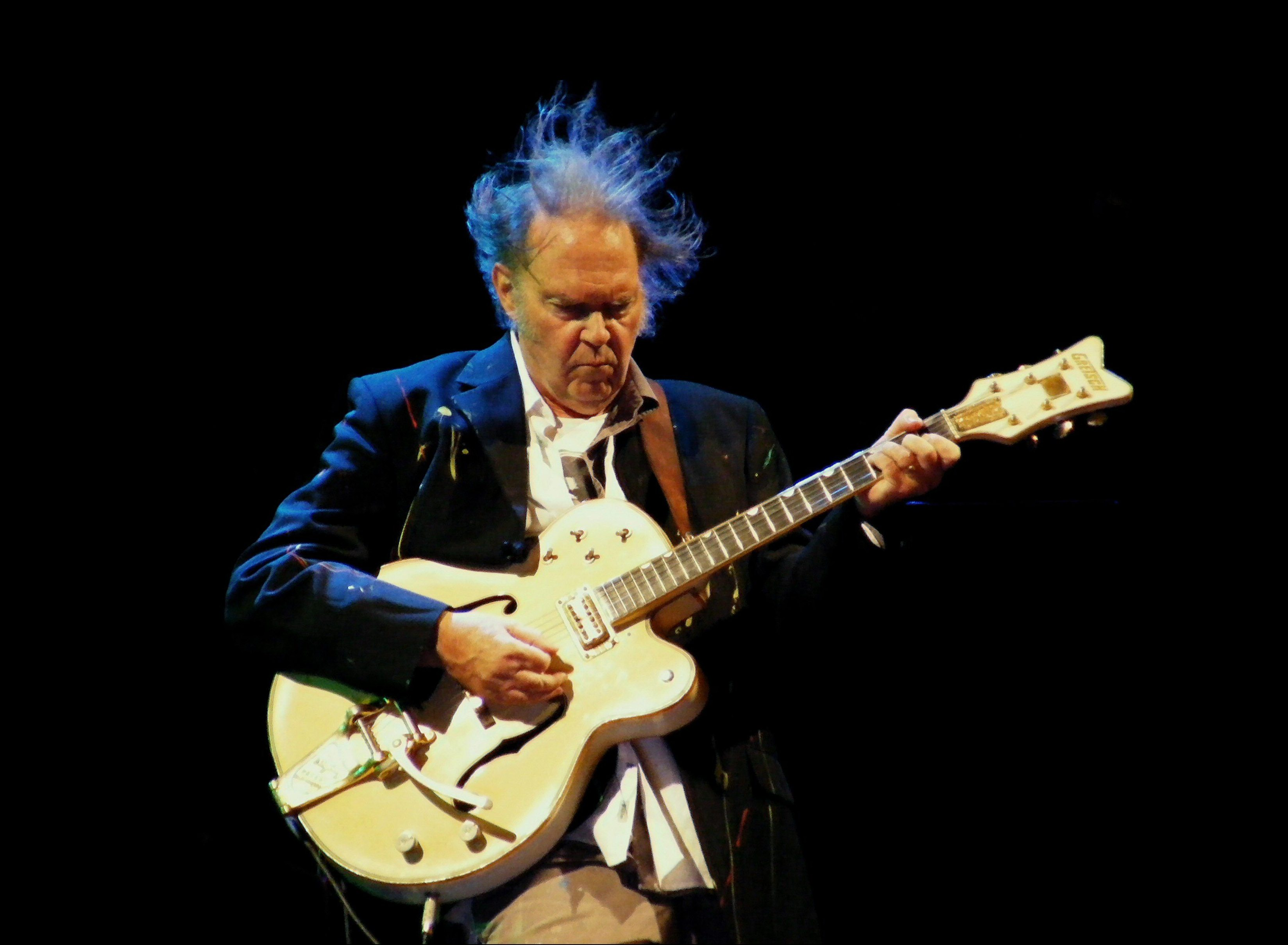
Neil Young, playing a Gretsch White Falcon on June 20, 2009

The high interest from sales representatives led Gretsch to rush the guitar into production, and the first White Falcons were sold in 1955, identified as the model 6136. As the company's new high-end guitar, Gretsch marketed it as "the finest guitar we know how to make – and what a beauty!" The White Falcon originally cost $600 (equivalent to $7,211 in 2025); this price was second only to the $690 price of Gibson's Super 400CESN.

Throughout the 1950s and 1960s, Gretsch tweaked the Falcon. The block inlays on the ebony fretboard were replaced with half-moon shaped inlays in 1957, the original single-coil DeArmond Dynasonic pickups were replaced with Filter'Tron humbuckers in 1958, and that same year the Melita bridge was replaced with a Space Control bridge — the Bigsby vibrato tailpiece was standard starting in 1962. Later, a stereo version (model 6137) became available as well. It also switched to a twin-cutaway body beginning in 1962.

Fred Gretsch, the company's owner at the time, retired in 1967 and sold his company to the Baldwin Piano Company. Baldwin would have trouble understanding guitars, which would cause the guitar to lose its popularity. This was not good for the company; the rockabilly era was just ending and rock was becoming more popular, with the rise of new guitarists such as Jimi Hendrix, Jeff Beck, Eric Clapton and others who were turning to Fender, rather than Gretsch.

The rapidly deteriorating Baldwin Manufacturing then experienced two destructive fires at its new Arkansas plant in 1973. Gretsch limped through the 1970s and finally closed in the 1980s. In 1989 Fred Gretsch III resumed control of the family business and began making guitars again. These instruments are based on classic Gretsch designs, including the White Falcon.

== 1995–present, model numbers 6136 and 7593 ==
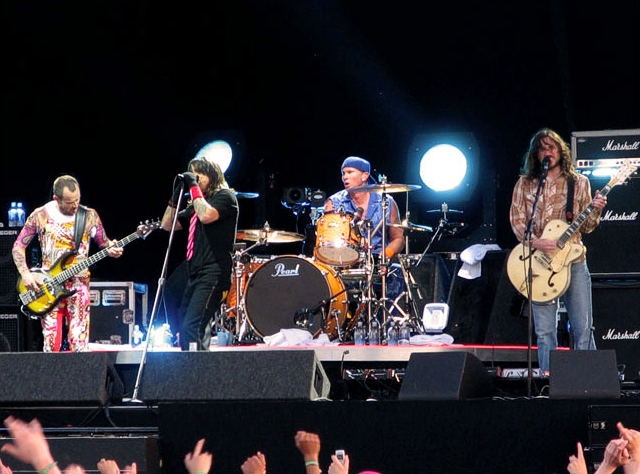
John Frusciante of the Red Hot Chili Peppers performing with a White Falcon in 2006

Models are now available commemorating every phase in the design of the White Falcon. Features are reproduced accordingly. Modern Falcons are also available in black and silver, and include a Stephen Stills signature model (based on the 1958 incarnation), as well as a green Bono Irish Falcon that incorporates the original vertical headstock logo and engraved block inlays with the post-1958 electronics configuration and features "The Goal Is Soul" silkscreened onto the pickguard. Gretsch added a Brian Setzer Black Phoenix model to its lineup. Like Brian Setzer's signature Hot Rod 6120, the Black Phoenix features stripped-down electronics that consist of two pickups, a selector switch, and a volume knob. In January 2013, Gretsch introduced the Billy Duffy signature model, replicating the Baldwin-era design with silver binding and chrome hardware.

== Bibliography ==
- Bacon, Tony; Dave Burrluck; Paul Day; Michael Wright (2000). Electric Guitars: The Illustrated Encyclopedia. Thunder Bay. ISBN 978-1-57145-281-8.
