= Gretsch BST 1000 =

Solid body electric guitar

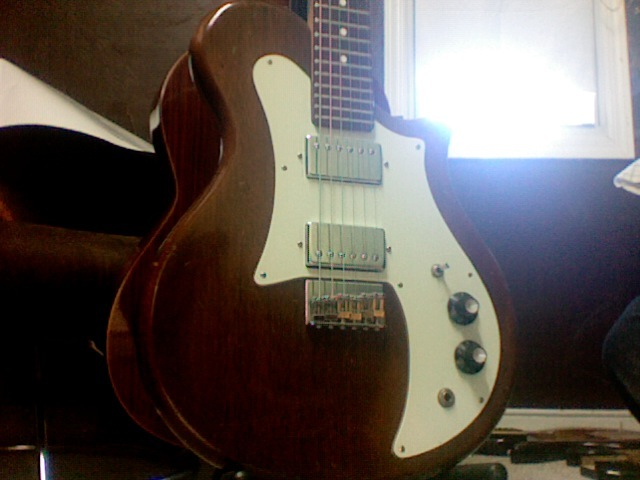

The Gretsch BST 1000 is a solid body electric guitar made between 1979 and 1981. It received the nickname "The Beast" from a Gretsch promotion distributed in 1979.

== Model Distinction ==
Two variations of the 1000 series exist although many features remain the same on both models. Some consistencies between the two models include a mahogany body and a bolt on maple neck. The first of the two guitars was made with dual chrome colored covered humbuckers and a white pickguard. "Gretsch" is written in cursive-like font running horizontal across the headstock when looking at the guitar sitting on a stand. It also has a flat fretboard similar to a classical guitar. The second model is also called the 1500 "but is still in the 1000 series as opposed to the 2000 and 5000 BST series". This model came stock with cream colored DiMarzio Super Distortion pickups with no covers and a black pickguard. The name "Gretsch" is written vertical across the headstock in classic Gretsch style writing featured on many other guitars and drums of the time. The BST 1000 and 1500 can be dated by removing the pickguard. Both guitars had serial and model numbers placed on a piece of paper by the volume and tone pots.

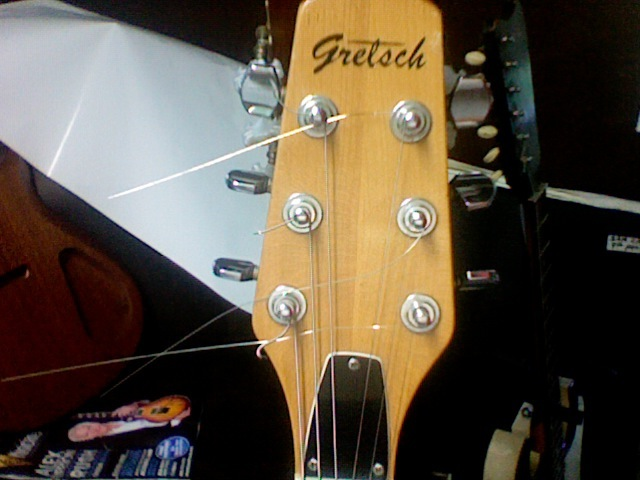

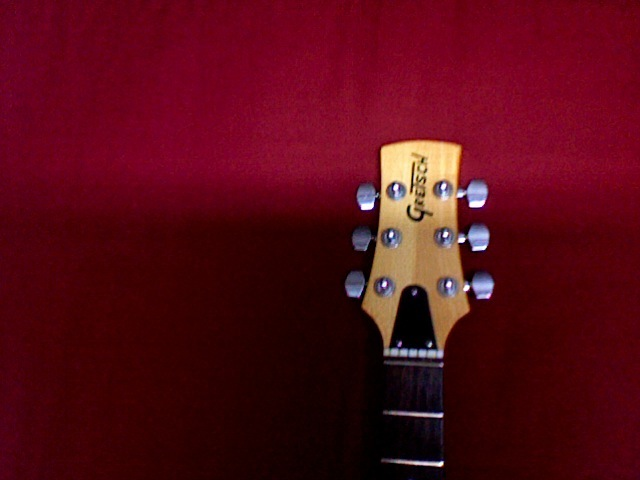

== Dating ==
To date the guitar, there are five numbers in the serial number. The first one or two digits represents the month the guitar was made; 1 would represent January and 10 would be October. After the first set of (one or two) digits is a dash followed by another series of 4 digits. The first number after the dash represents the last digit of the year the guitar was made; 9 represents 1979, 0 represents 1980, and 1 would represent 1981. The last three numbers represent the number of guitars made that month including that guitar; 435 would mean the guitar is the 435th guitar made that month.

EXAMPLE: 10-9434 would be the 434th guitar made in October 1979. 4-1211 would be the 211th guitar made in April 1981.
