= Bigsby Electric Guitars =

American guitar brand

Bigsby
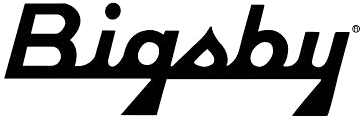
- Formerly: Bigsby Electric Guitar Company
- Company type: Private (1946–66); Brand (1966–present)
- Industry: Musical instruments
- Founded: 1946; 80 years ago
- Founder: Paul Bigsby
- Headquarters: Scottsdale, AZ, United States
- Key people: Paul Bigsby, Ted McCarty, Fred Gretsch
- Products: Current: Vibrato system; Former: Electric guitars
- Owner: Paul Bigsby (1946–65); Ted McCarty (1966–99); Fred W. Gretsch Enterprises (1999–2019); Fender (2019–)
- Website: bigsby.com

Bigsby is a brand of guitars and guitar accessories that operated as an independent company by Paul Bigsby until 1966 when it was purchased by ex-Gibson executive Ted McCarty. In 1999, the brand was acquired by Gretsch from McCarty, which owned it until 2019, when Bigsby was sold to Fender Musical Instruments Corporation.

An early innovator of solid body electric guitars and accessories, the company was the first to introduce a guitar headstock that had all of its tuning pegs on the same side. This design was later adopted by manufacturers such as Fender for their Telecaster and Stratocaster models. Best known, however, was the development of the Bigsby vibrato tailpiece, a wildly popular vibrato arm for guitars that was installed on their own models, as well as numerous other companies such as Gretsch, Gibson, Ibanez and many others.

== History ==
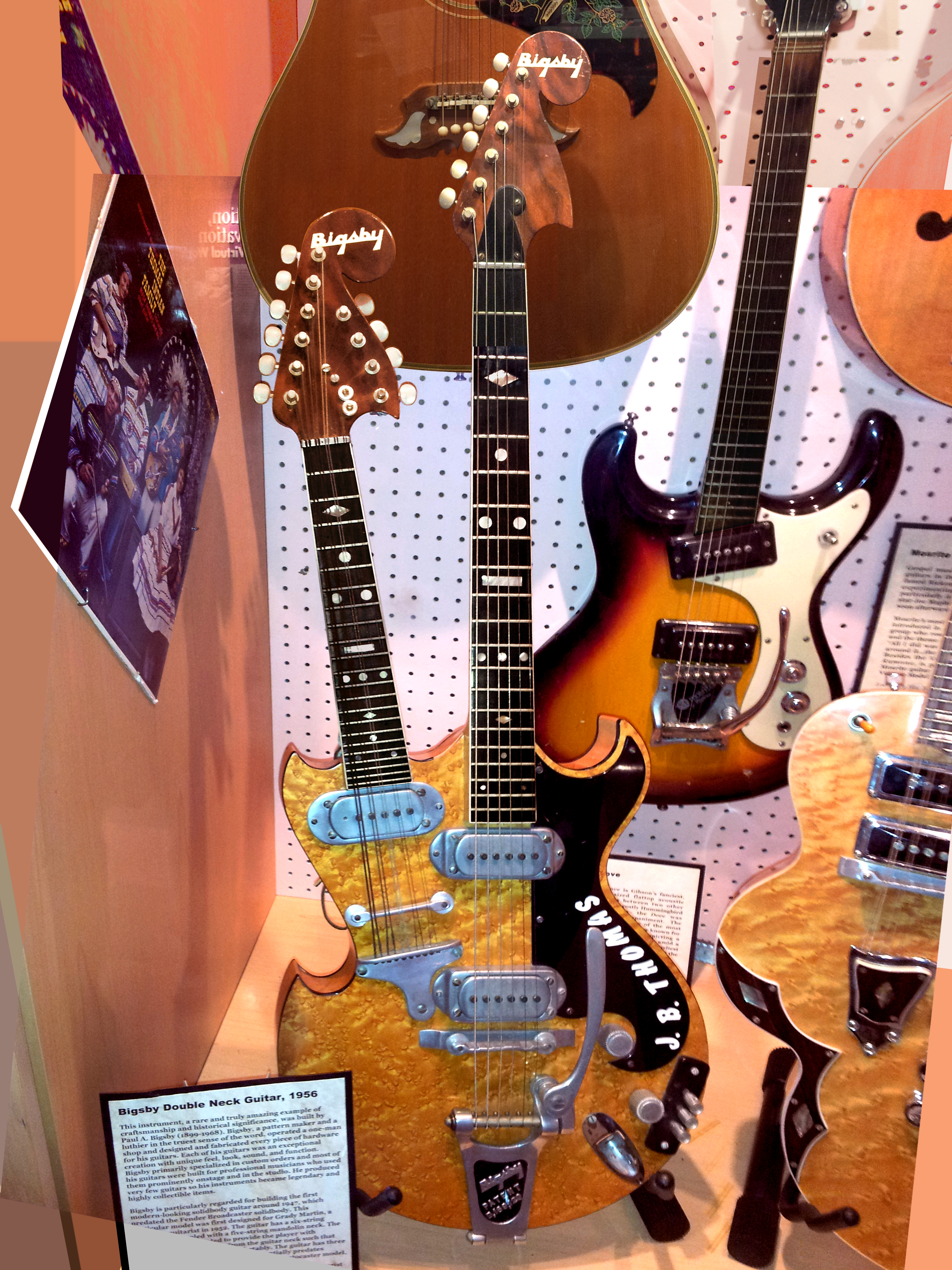
Bigsby double-neck guitar (1956)

The company was founded as "Bigsby Electric Guitar Company" by Paul Bigsby, a motorcycle repairman. Bigsby was friends with several musicians, including Merle Travis and Spade Cooley. He started repairing guitars on the side, and gained a reputation for his innovative modifications. Merle Travis approached Bigsby to repair his Gibson L-10's Kauffman Vibrola arm. Instead, Bigsby came up with a completely new design to replace it, which evolved into the Bigsby tailpiece that became a world-wide standard for electric guitar vibrato arms. Travis later came up with a rough design for a guitar with a unique headstock that had all of its tuning pegs on one side. Bigsby hand-built the guitar for him, and based on its success, started a small workshop next to his house in Downey, California, to build electric guitars.

Besides solid-body electric guitars, he also custom-manufactured steel guitars, both lap steel and pedal steel varieties. Most famously, in 1948 he built the custom, triple-neck four-pedal model played by Speedy West, one of the first such pedal steel guitars to be used in country music. Bigsby hand-built all of his own instruments, down to hand-wiring his own pickups, though the demand for his custom guitars as well as his popular vibrato tailpiece often meant that there was a waiting list in excess of two years for his guitars. In declining health, and unable to meet demand, he sold the company to Ted McCarty in 1966.

Bigsby kept very poor records of his work, so the company's output of custom guitars under Paul Bigsby's ownership is mostly speculation. Current company historians "can document only 47 steels, six standard guitars, one tenor guitar, two double neck guitars, two mandolins and six neck replacements that are still around today" that were authentic Paul Bigsby constructions. For many decades, the brand was only used for its vibrato tailpieces, though periodically limited runs of guitars, mostly of replica models of Paul Bigsby's original designs, have been produced. Until recently, the company offered seven different solid body electric guitar models.

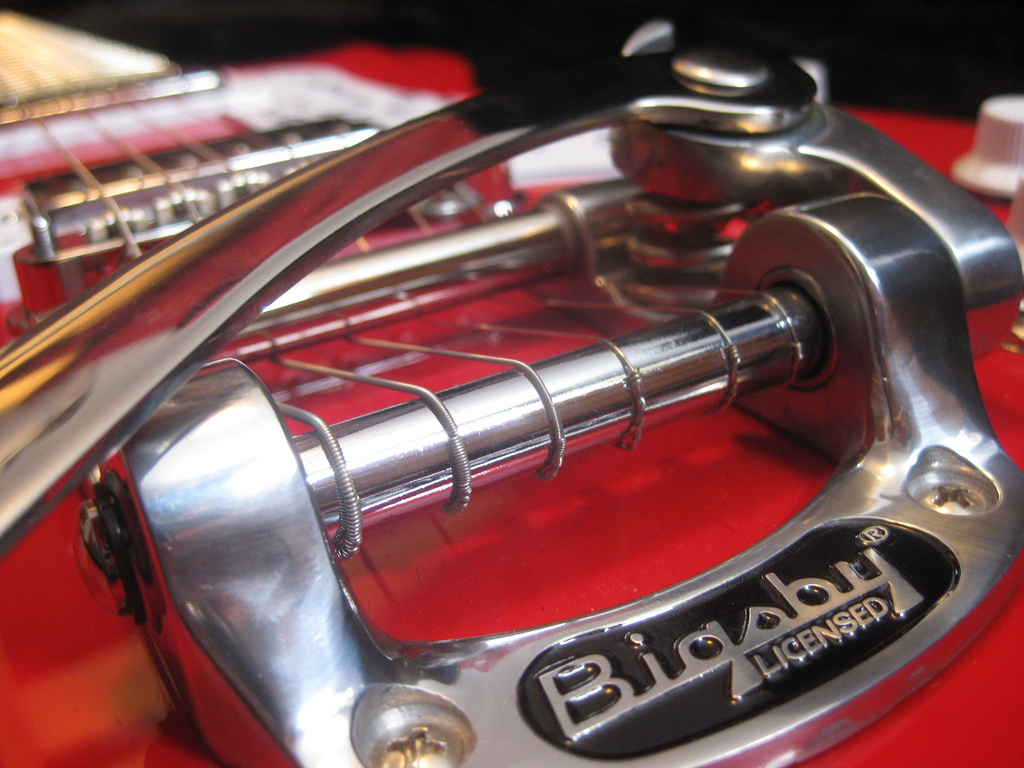
the Bigsby model B50 vibrato tailpiece on an Eastwood Airline Coronado DLX

In January 2019, Fender Musical Instruments Corporation announced the acquisition of the Bigsby brand and its assets from Fred Gretsch Enterprises.
