= Gretsch 6128 =

Electric guitar model

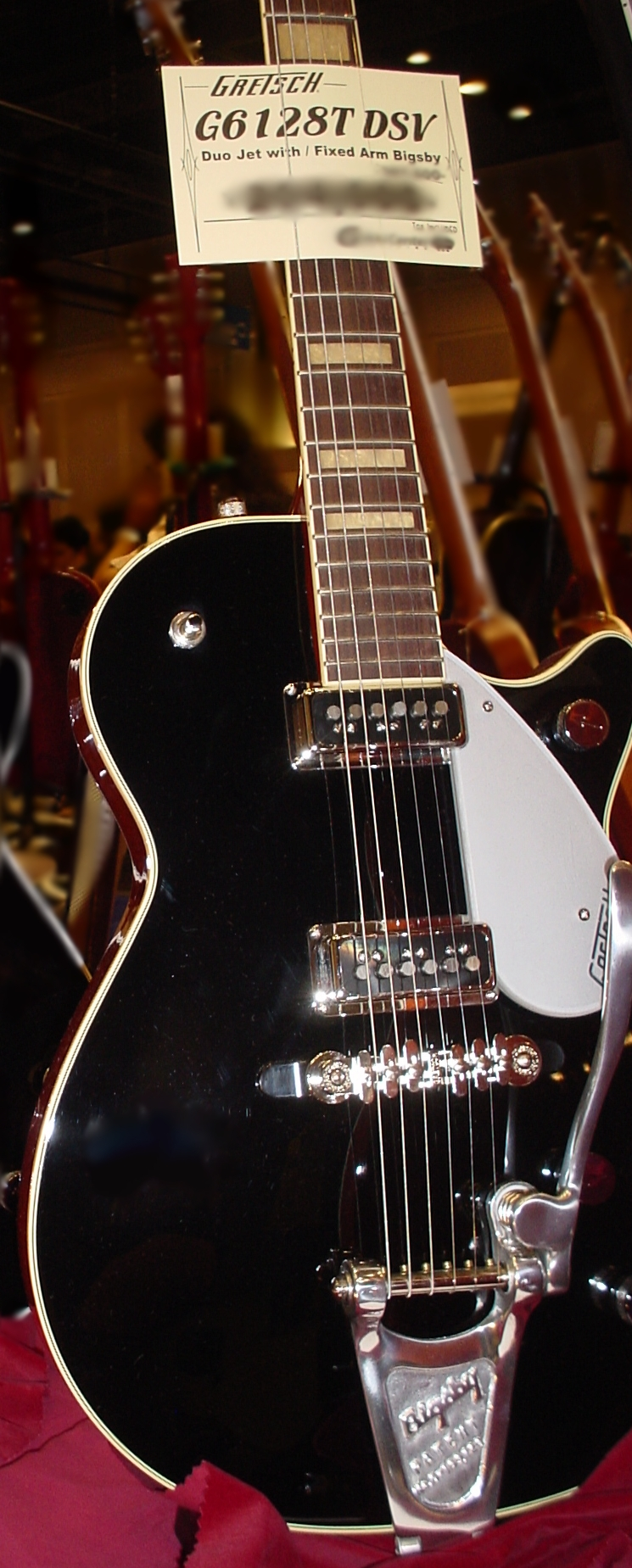
- Gretsch G6128T DSV with Bigsby vibrato tailpiece
- Manufacturer: Gretsch
- Period: 1953–present

Construction
- Body type: Chambered
- Neck joint: Set neck

Woods
- Body: Mahogany (often with a maple top); Swamp ash (rare)
- Neck: Usually mahogany Maple
- Fretboard: Usually Rosewood; Ebony; Maple; Richlite

Hardware
- Bridge: Usually Tune-O-Matic
- Pickup: Usually 2 humbuckers

Colors available
- Various, often sunburst-type finishes Goldtop; Ebony; Alpine White; Wine Red; Silver; Emerald

The Gretsch 6128 (Duo Jet) is a chambered solid body electric guitar which has been manufactured by Gretsch since 1953.

== Origins ==
The Duo Jet was first introduced in 1953, after the success of the Gibson Les Paul Goldtop. A difference between the two is that the Duo Jet has a semi-hollow body with routed channels and internal pockets instead of a solid body.

It is believed that the name Duo Jet was inspired by the fact that the guitar has two pickups (Duo) and by the advanced aircraft of the time (Jet). This was the first Gretsch guitar to feature a truss rod accessible through the headstock, a pickup selection switch on the body, and a master volume on the cutaway.

== Construction ==
As is common with electric guitars, the body of the 6128 Duo Jet is made of wood, in this case chambered mahogany. The guitar shares its dual pickup, single cutaway design with the Gibson Les Paul, but the Duo Jet takes differing approaches to shaping the instrument’s tonality and has been made available in various configurations.

The tone switch versions of the Duo Jet come equipped with Gretsch's Filter'Tron humbucker pickup made popular by country music guitarist Chet Atkins.

== Notable users ==
George Harrison played a 1957 Duo Jet during The Beatles' early days in Hamburg, and on their first US album. Harrison also posed with the guitar for the cover of his 1987 solo album, Cloud Nine.

Other notable players of the Duo Jet include Pete Townshend of The Who, who used one on early Quadrophenia era gigs in the UK, and Chris Cornell of Soundgarden. David Gilmour of Pink Floyd owned a 1950s Duo Jet which he used on some of his early work and then again later in his career.

== Variations ==
- G6128 – Filtertron pickups, no Bigsby tailpiece
- G6128T – Bigsby and Filtertron pickups
- G6128T-DS – Bigsby and Dynasonic pickups, Rosewood fingerboard, originally based on 1957 version, currently based on 1955 version
- G6128-DS – Dynasonic pickups, no bigsby, Rosewood fingerboard
- G6128T-DCM – Bigsby and Filtertron pickups, Double Cut-away, Dark Cherry Metallic, Ebony Fretboard
- G6128-1962 – Double cutaway version of the Duo Jet, equipped with Bigsby and Filtertron pickups
- G6128T59 – Bigsby and TV Jones classic pickups (Vintage Select '59 Duo Jet edition)
- G6128TCG – Bigsby and Dynasonic pickups, in a Cadillac Green finish with Gold hardware
- G6128TVP – aka the "Power Jet" Pickups are upgraded to TV Jones Power'Trons
- G6128T-TVP – Bigsby equipped version of the Power Jet
- G6128T 6 12 – Double-necked six- and twelve-string guitar with 4 Filtertron pickups.
- G6128T-GH – Custom shop and standard versions of George Harrison's Duo Jet. The custom shop version is designed and built to appear like George Harrison's original appears today. Standard version has the color scheme of Harrison's guitar and features his signature on truss-rod cover. Both versions include all black body and moved bottom strap pin.
- G6128T-CLFG - Cliff Gallup Signature Duo Jet. Cliff Gallup kept his guitar stock, so this version is essentially a custom shop replica of a '54 Duo Jet.
- G6128B - "Thunder Jet" bass version with TV Jones Thunder'Tron pickups

=== Other versions ===
"Silver Jet"

- G6129 – topped with silver sparkle drum material. Same features as the standard G6128 Duo Jet
- G6129T – equipped with Bigsby
- G6129-1957 – Rosewood finger board, Dynasonic pickups, and no Bigsby
- G6219T-1957 – Rosewood finger board, Dyansonic pickups, with Bigsby
- G6219T-1962 – Double cutaway version, with Bigsby and Filtertrons

"Round Up"

- G6130 – Orange stain, leather bound with western motif carved into the leather, G Branded body, Dynasonic pickups, gold hardware, Rosewood fretboard, no Bigsby

"Jet Firebird"

- G6131 – Duo Jet in Fire Red finish, with Filtertrons, no Bigsby
- G6131T – Fire Red, with Bigsby and Filtertron pickups
- G6131TVP – "Power Jet" version with TV Jones Power'Tron pickups, pinned bridge, Schaller strap locks
- G6131T-TVP – "Power Jet" version with TV Jones Power'Tron pickups, pinned bridge, Sperzel locking tuners, Schaller strap locks, and a Bigsby tailpiece

=== Rock Band controller ===
A replica of George Harrison's Duo Jet is the basis for a guitar controller for The Beatles: Rock Band.
