= MotorAve =

American guitar manufacturing company

MotorAve Guitars
- Industry: Musical instruments
- Founded: May 24, 2002; 24 years ago
- Founder: Mark Fuqua
- Headquarters: North Carolina, United States
- Products: Electric guitars
- Owner: Mark Fuqua
- Number of employees: 0
- Website: motorave.com

MotorAve (abbreviation for Motor Avenue Guitars) is an American guitar manufacturing company. MotorAve builds electric guitars. The company also performs guitar repairs and guitar modifications. MotorAve was founded in Los Angeles, California, by Mark Fuqua in 2002. Its headquarters are in Durham, North Carolina.

== History ==
Before founding MotorAve in 2002, luthier Mark Fuqua worked as a freelancer for guitar shops in San Francisco, California, while he began his first guitar repair business. Fuqua moved to Paris, France in 1998, where he continued building guitars for a living.

In 2002, Fuqua opened his first MotorAve brick-and-mortar in Los Angeles. Fuqua moved the shop to Hollywood, California, in 2007, before relocating the business to Durham, North Carolina.

== Guitars ==
All MotorAve guitars are built by hand and can be fitted with several different options including different pick ups, fretboard, inlays and finishes.

=== BelAire ===
The BelAire originated as a solid-body guitar built as a one-off for a customer looking for a large guitar due to his own large stature. To avoid back routed control cavities, the guitar was designed with a large pickguard, similar to the one of a Fender Telecaster Thinline. After the guitar was delivered Fuqua decided to create a semi-hollow version of the guitar with a Bigsby vibrato. The guitar had a solid core in the body's center and a sharp sound hole similar to what is normally found on Rickenbackers. During its construction, Alain Johannes visited the shop to pick up a vintage Maton which had been repaired and took a liking to the unfinished guitar. A few weeks later the finished guitar was delivered to Johannes and a week later Queens of the Stone Age frontman Josh Homme ordered one for himself which was his main guitar during the recording of Era Vulgaris.

=== LeMans ===
The LeMans was specially designed to be extremely thin much like a Gibson SG. The guitar is fitted with a single bridge pickup to allow for an extra strong neck joint which allows extra transference between neck and body. Another feature to make the guitar simple and easy to maintain is the control plate with a single volume control and jack input, the short and simple circuit also reduces capacitance for a clear tone. One of the first LeMans models were built for American hard rock band Burning Brides guitarist and vocalist Dimitri Coats.
