= The Beatles: Rock Band =

2009 video game

- Developer: Harmonix (Note: Wii version developed by Pi Studios)
- Publisher: MTV Games
- Director: Josh Randall
- Producers: Naoko Takamoto; Jason Kendall; Pete Maguire; Alex Rossi; Jason Warburg; Heather Wilson
- Designers: Chris Foster; Sylvain Dubrofsky; Casey Malone
- Programmers: Marc Flury; James Fleming; Dan Schmidt
- Artist: Dare Matheson
- Writers: Helen McWilliams; Brett Milano
- Series: Rock Band
- Platforms: PlayStation 3; Wii; Xbox 360
- Release: September 9, 2009
- Genre: Rhythm
- Modes: Single-player, multiplayer

The Beatles: Rock Band is a 2009 rhythm game developed by Harmonix, published by MTV Games, and distributed by Electronic Arts. It is the fourth installment in the Rock Band series and the first band-centric game. Centered on the English rock group the Beatles, the game features virtual portrayals of the four band members performing the songs throughout the band's history, including depictions of some of their famous live performances, as well as a number of "dreamscape" sequences for songs from the Abbey Road Studios recording sessions during the group's studio years. The game's soundtrack consists of 45 Beatles songs; additional songs and albums by the Beatles were made available for the game as downloadable content.

The game was released internationally for PlayStation 3, Wii, and Xbox 360 on September 9, 2009, coinciding with the release of new, remastered compact disc versions of the Beatles' albums. It incorporates many of the gameplay features of the Rock Band series; however, it is not an expansion pack for the Rock Band series and content for it and other Rock Band titles is not cross-compatible. Gameplay mechanics differ slightly from previous Rock Band games, including the addition of a three-part vocal harmony system. Subsequent games in the Rock Band series would reuse these new elements, including vocal harmonies.

The game was developed with the blessing and critical input of Apple Corps, including former Beatles Paul McCartney and Ringo Starr, who both made public appearances promoting the game. George Harrison's son Dhani helped to bridge discussion between Harmonix and Apple Corps, while Giles Martin, son of the Beatles' music producer George Martin, ensured high-fidelity versions of the Beatles' songs would be available.

The Beatles: Rock Band was critically acclaimed, being praised both as a genuine means of experiencing the music and history of the Beatles, and as a standalone music video game. Although the game's sales were considered respectable, with more than half a million units sold during its first month of release in the United States, analysts had projected larger sales volumes and attributed the lower sales to waning interest in the rhythm game genre and the video game industry recovery from the late-2000s recession.

== Gameplay ==
The Beatles: Rock Band's interface is stylistically unique to reflect the band's era. For songs with multiple vocals, such as "I Feel Fine" here, harmonious pitch lines are shown on the vocal track (top) for players to match, although they will still score points if they simply follow the lead's pitch.

The Beatles: Rock Band allows players to perform simulated rock music by providing up to six players with the ability to play three different controllers modeled after music instruments (a guitar controller for lead guitar and bass guitar gameplay, a drum controller and up to three microphones for vocals). Players simulate the performance of rock music by using their controllers to play scrolling on-screen notes. For lead and bass guitar, this is accomplished by holding down colored buttons mimicking guitar frets and pushing the controller's strum bar; for drums, this requires striking the matching colored drumhead, or stepping on the pedal to simulate playing bass drum notes. A "Lefty" mode allows left-handed people to play, by switching which colour the beats are given. When singing vocals, the player must sing in relative pitch to the original vocals. A pitch indicator displays the singer's accuracy relative to the original pitch. For songs with multi-part vocals, players need only to stay in tone with the lead singer to score points and keep their performance meter up, but players earn additional scoring bonuses when they successfully complete phrases in harmony.

As in previous Rock Band games, successfully hitting the proper notes in sequence earns points for each player and boosts their "performance meter". Each separate instrument is given a level, defined by their instrument icon, and the average level is also displayed. If a player fails to match the notes, their performance meter drops. If the meter empties, that player is forced to drop out of play, which in turn causes the band's overall performance to drop. Any player to drop out can be "saved" if another player activates "Beatlemania" (referred to as "Overdrive" in other Rock Band titles), which is collected by successfully completing specially marked phrases. These phrases appear in white, and if the phrase is completed, the energy bar, displayed at the bottom of every track, fills by one quarter. Beatlemania can also be used to temporarily increase the number of points the band earns. Activating Beatlemania is specific to each "instrument". For guitar, the controller must be temporarily shifted to an upright position; for drums, a special "cymbal" (Green, or red for "Lefty" mode) is hit; and for vocals, a noise must be registered by the microphone when prompted.

Some alterations to the Rock Band formula were made to preserve the sound of the Beatles' music. Audio cues that provide feedback on how well the band is doing, typically through the crowd cheering, singing along with the lyrics, or booing if the band is failing, are not included. The virtual band members are not booed off the stage if a player fails a song. Rather, the game simply cuts to a "song failed" menu with the option to try again. The song is restarted from the beginning. Variations on Overdrive/Beatlemania activation include the removal of player-controlled audio effects. While guitar players can use the controller's whammy bar on sustained marked note to collect more Beatlemania, this does not alter the sound of the note. There are also no freestyle drum fills in the songs for activating Beatlemania; instead the player continues to perform the correct note sequence before being presented with a note to activate Beatlemania.

Throughout the song, players receive points for every note hit, and this is totalled up and displayed at the end of the song, along with a percentage of how many notes they hit, and a rating: 1 to 5 stars. If the score is close to perfect, normally requiring at least 98% of the notes, the rating is five 'gold' stars, instead of the normal bronze. The score is saved and shown alongside the song in the select screen; over time, as the song is replayed, it shows only the highest score.

=== Instrument peripherals ===
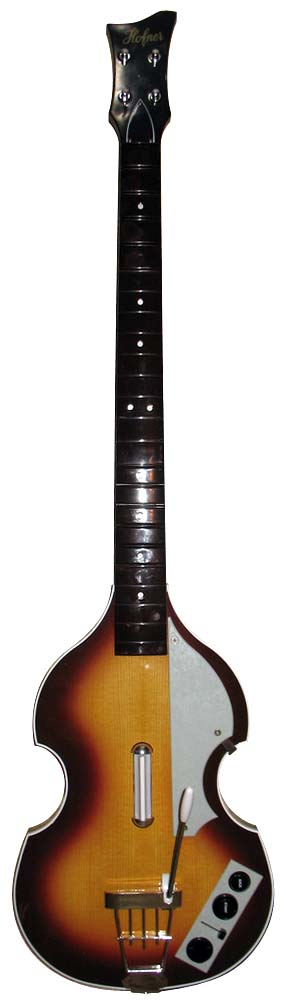
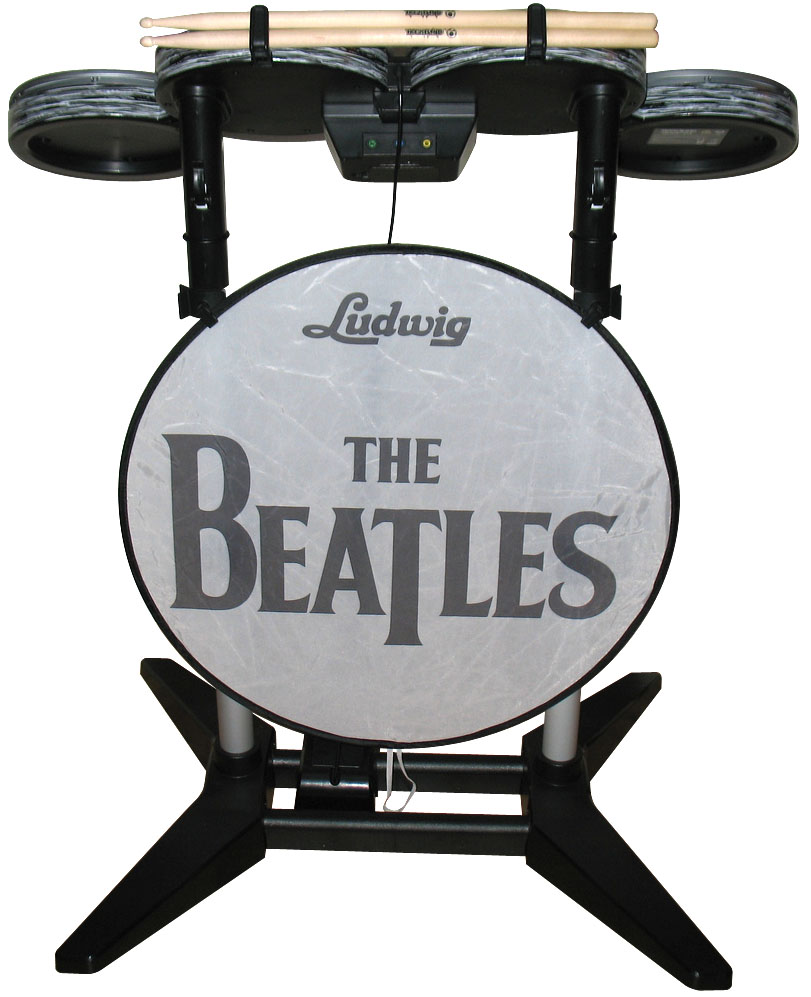
Instrument peripherals designed for The Beatles: Rock Band include the Höfner 500/1-inspired bass controller (left) and Ludwig drum controller (right) that were shipped as bundles with the game. Controllers based on the Rickenbacker 325 and Gretsch Duo Jet were also created and sold separately.

All Rock Band peripherals that were available at the time of the game's release are compatible with their respective console version of The Beatles: Rock Band. Similarly, peripherals designed for The Beatles: Rock Band are backward compatible with other Rock Band titles. Some controllers designed for Guitar Hero games will also work with The Beatles: Rock Band.

Four new instrument peripherals modeled after those used by the Beatles members were introduced alongside the game: a Rickenbacker 325 guitar, a Gretsch Duo Jet guitar, a Höfner bass and a Ludwig drum set. These instrument controllers function similarly to the controllers designed for Rock Band 2, with most alterations being purely aesthetic. A "Limited Edition" bundle of the game includes one Höfner bass guitar controller, one Ludwig-branded drum controller, a microphone, a microphone stand and Beatles-themed postcards. A second, less expensive bundle configuration contains peripherals first introduced with the original Rock Band game; this bundle does not contain a mic stand or postcards. The game was also released as a SingStar bundle with two microphones, and finally as a standalone release. The Rickenbacker and Gretsch guitar peripherals are sold separately. The Höfner Bass's neck is a little longer for accuracy to the real thing.

=== Modes ===
The Beatles: Rock Band features gameplay modes similar to other Rock Band games, playable both locally and online. "Story" mode is similar to the "Career" mode of the first Rock Band game and follows a linear progression through the Beatles history. Optional challenges are available in each story "chapter", tasking players to complete every song in a specific chapter as a single performance. By earning high score ratings for songs or challenges, players will unlock photographs and video clips of the Beatles taken from the Apple Corps' archive to provide "splashes of history". One such unlockable "prize" is an edited version of the 1963 Beatles Christmas Record.

Up to six players can play any song in the game cooperatively via "Solo/Band Quickplay" mode. Two players can also play against one another in Rock Band's two competitive modes: "Tug of War", where two players perform alternating sections of songs to outdo the other's performance, and "Score Duel", where each player simultaneously plays the entirety of a song while trying to accumulate the highest score. Tug of War allows players to choose individual difficulty levels, while Score Duel requires that both players play at the same difficulty level. Both competitive modes require that players use the same type of instrument.

Several "Training" modes are available for The Beatles: Rock Band, including tutorials for both guitar/bass and drums. Practice modes are instrument-specific and allow players to practice entire songs or individual sections of songs. Guitar, bass, and drum practice modes allow players to slow the tempos of songs; vocal practice mode helps to emphasize the selected harmony portion of the vocals by adding a generated waveform sound to the selected harmony line in tune with the lyrics. There are also two drum training modes called "Drum Lessons" and "Beatle Beats".

Before playing, a difficulty has to be selected: easy, medium, hard or expert. Expert is a match of the original notes; hard has some note-heavy drum rolls and other difficult or fast notes removed; medium takes away the orange notes (for guitar and bass) and anything else considered tricky. Easy is designed for new players, and gives an easy rhythm for those to settle into the game. A "No Fail" mode has been carried over from Rock Band 2 and is accessible from the band members selection screen rather than from the game's main menu. This mode lets players continue playing even if their performance meter hits rock bottom. In addition, No Fail mode is automatically enabled for any player who chooses the "Easy" difficulty.

== Development ==
=== Conception ===
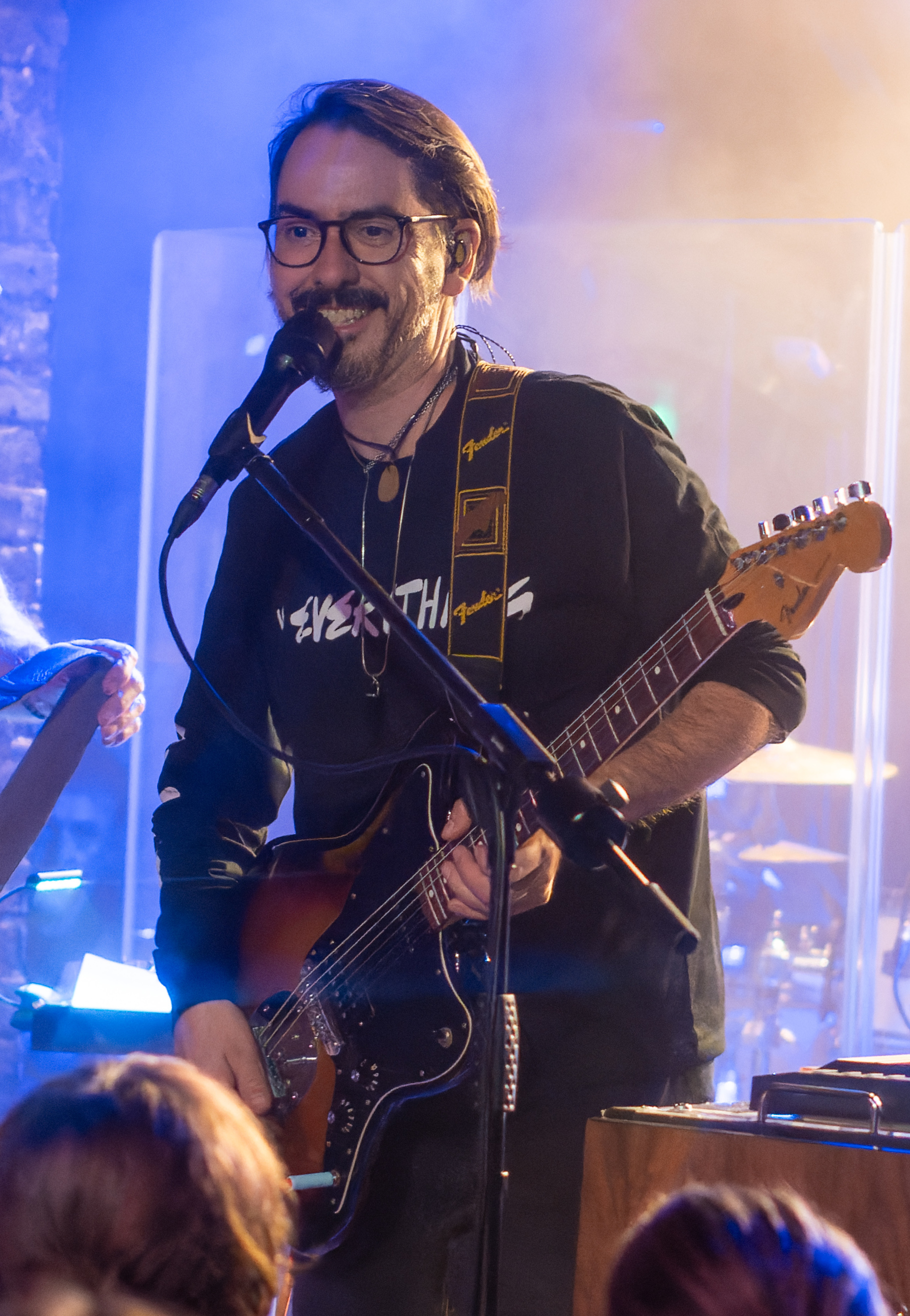
George Harrison's son, Dhani, was instrumental in bridging discussions between Harmonix and Apple Corps.

Prior to The Beatles: Rock Band, no song by the Beatles, nor a cover of a Beatles song, had been featured in any Guitar Hero or Rock Band title, whether as disc-based or downloadable content. The idea of The Beatles: Rock Band came about during a chance encounter between MTV president Van Toffler and Dhani Harrison, son of George Harrison, at a luncheon sponsored by Robert Earl during the 2006 Christmas holiday, shortly after MTV's acquisition of Harmonix. Dhani, having been familiar with the Guitar Hero franchise and learning of the recent acquisition and plans for Rock Band (in which music from his band, thenewno2, had been featured by way of downloadable content) from Toffler, suggested a game based on the Beatles. Though both Dhani and Toffler considered the concept an unlikely possibility, their meeting nonetheless spurred Dhani into further discussions with Harmonix's president, Alex Rigopulos. At the same time, Dhani helped to introduce the Rock Band concept to the Beatles' company Apple Corps, and the shareholders Olivia Harrison (his mother), Paul McCartney, Ringo Starr and Yoko Ono. Initial meetings were arranged with the shareholders using an early prototype of the game to garner their interest in the title. One stipulation that the Apple Corps shareholders required of Harmonix was that the game feature songs spanning the band's entire career. Harmonix subsequently created a more complete demonstration that used examples of music and artwork that they envisioned for the game. The five-song demo, which included an early build for "Here Comes the Sun", was finished in February 2008. It was used to gain approval from McCartney, Starr, Ono and Olivia Harrison, effectively bringing them aboard the project as creative partners.

The Apple Corps shareholders considered The Beatles: Rock Band a new way to introduce the band's music to the public. They approved of the songs and venues that would appear in the game, and provided feedback on the artwork, character representations, and storyboards for animation sequences. McCartney and Starr fact-checked certain anecdotes relating to the Beatles while Ono and Harrison provided insight on their late husbands' performances and lyrics. At the developer's request, Ono visited the Harmonix offices late in development to provide critical feedback on several visual elements, an event MTV's senior vice president Paul DeGooyer and Harmonix head Alex Rigopulos called "a high point of the two-year development process".

Though The Beatles: Rock Band aims to present a visual and musical history of the Beatles, the game does not attempt to replicate periods of turmoil between the band members. Rather, it presents a "fantasy version" of the Beatles to better serve the entertainment purposes of the video game. For example, Starr was estranged from the rest of the band during periods of recording for The Beatles (commonly referred to as the White Album). Thus, he did not perform on certain songs, such as "Back in the U.S.S.R." or "Dear Prudence". In the game, however, Starr plays drums during the animated performances of both songs.

=== Music production ===
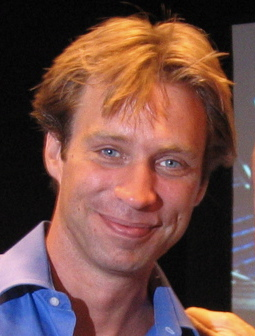
Giles Martin served as music producer on The Beatles: Rock Band. He had previously co-produced the Love remix album with his father, George Martin, who produced nearly every album by the Beatles.

Preparing the Beatles' songs for Rock Band was a significant technical challenge for Harmonix. The band's earlier songs, recorded on two-track and four-track equipment, needed to be reworked into a multitrack format that is essential in providing feedback to players. Each of the game's four instrument parts need to have their own "stems"—for example, when a player misplays a note from the guitar track, the guitar audio for the song will be temporarily quieted, leaving the other instruments' audio unaffected. Such isolated tracks were not available through the new 2009 remasters, so the team started with the original master recordings.

The development team was able to bring Giles Martin aboard as the game's music producer. Martin had recently completed co-production on the 2006 Love project with his father George Martin and was already familiar with the Beatles catalogue. Through that project, Martin created digital back-up copies of all the original tapes, which aided his work on The Beatles: Rock Band. Using audio forensics software, Martin and his team were able to extract the audio of individual instruments by isolating sounds at certain frequencies with digital filters, thus assuring multitrack capabilities for the Beatles' master recordings. This process, conducted at Abbey Road Studio 52 with the help of Paul Hicks and other Abbey Road recording engineers, reportedly took months to complete.

During the game's development, Harmonix only used low-fidelity versions of the remasters, which were sufficient for programming and note charting; Apple Corps feared that the leak of any high-fidelity remastered track from Abbey Road studios would lead to the unauthorized use of samples of the Beatles' music in remixes. High-fidelity versions of the songs were not implemented until the final publishing of the game. Harmonix performed very little additional remixing upon receipt of these remasters; in some cases, three different guitar parts—lead, solo, and rhythm—were brought into a single cohesive guitar part, slightly raising the volume of the specific guitar track that was used in note tracking to make it easier for the player to follow in the game. The ability for up to three players to sing vocal harmonies, a feature not present in previous Rock Band games, was designed and implemented as an optional feature so as not to be overwhelming to players.

While live recordings of songs, such as "Paperback Writer" at the Budokan, were available, Martin believed some of these renditions were sloppy and would not be enjoyable to play. Instead, he took the studio versions and added audio effects from the live performances to create a "live concert" ambiance. In several instances, the team also opted to slightly restructure the endings to certain songs, particularly those that fade out. Differences in editing between the album versions and in-game versions of songs continued with the release of downloadable content, notably the inclusion of a once-missing final chord at the end of the Abbey Road closer "Her Majesty".

Dhani Harrison stated the game would include "stuff that has never been heard, never been released". Some of the new material includes band chatter and instrument tunes taken from recorded performances. This audio plays during the loading screens or bookends certain songs. Within the Abbey Road studio, Martin recreated some of the incidental sound, played through speakers but capturing the acoustics of the studio room. In one instance, for example, this process involved recording four people miming the act of drinking tea. The entirety of the game's credits are also made up of this band chatter and studio takes.

In coordination with the art team, sound programmers attempted to realistically map the game's note tracks relative to the real performances by the Beatles. For guitar parts, colored notes were selected not necessarily to match tonally with the music, but to replicate the movement and finger positioning used by the original performers. These were then matched against ten different strumming animations to be used for the virtual depictions of the guitarists. The "Expert" difficulty drum tracks attempt to match every single drum beat that is performed in a song, including some peculiar rhythms brought about by Starr's ambidextrous drumming habits. Vocals were slowed down and broken into phonetic segments, allowing the art team to determine the appropriate facial movement for the virtual characters to go along with the lyrics.

=== Art production ===
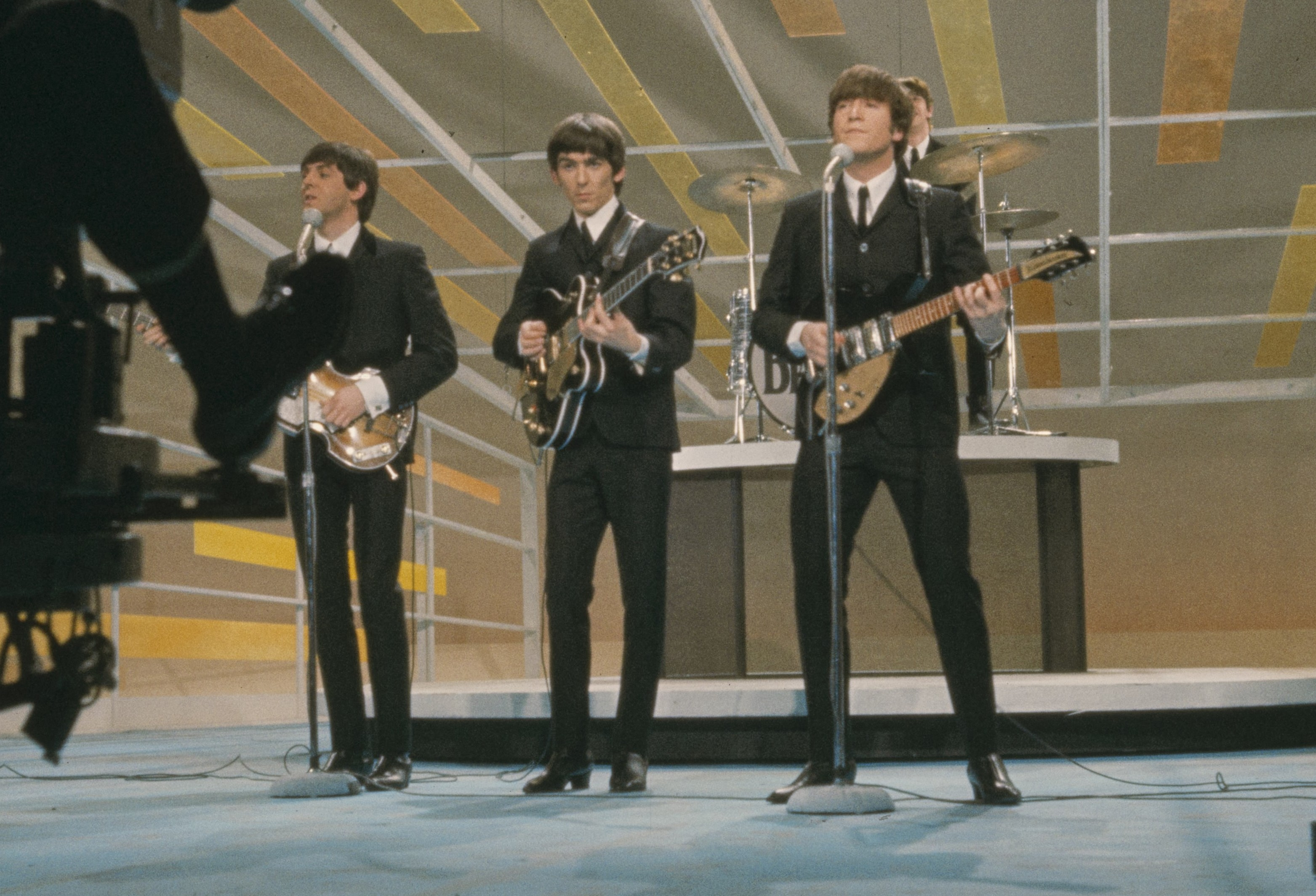
A recreation of the set for The Ed Sullivan Show when The Beatles performed their first live broadcast in the United States; its yellow tint, used to emphasize the performers on black-and-white television, is a detail obtained from photographs in Apple Corps' archive.

Art assets were created with help of Apple Corps, with Harmonix developers gaining access to their unique archive as well as personal photos from the shareholders. Apple Corps had strict desires for how the Beatles were to appear; art director Ryan Lesser noted that the art team's earliest character designs were met with "brutal" responses from Apple, but that this feedback was essential in developing the visual styles of the band. In addition to Apple Corps' material, Harmonix designers watched the eight-part The Beatles Anthology on a weekly basis for further reference on the band. These materials were meticulously reviewed to replicate the outfits that the Beatles wore for each of their concerts, as well as the instruments they used for recordings and live performances.

Although McCartney had hoped technology would allow the virtual band members to appear in hyper-realistic detail, Harmonix opted to start with more exaggerated, cartoon-like designs, gradually scaling them back to appear more realistic. Animation for the Beatles characters was aided by motion capture provided by Beatles tribute band The Fab Four. Dhani Harrison also assisted with modeling for character animation in the game.

The team designed venues that represented parts of the Beatles' history in order to create an atmosphere of authenticity. For example, the set of The Ed Sullivan Show was recreated from photographs and videos, including a rare color photograph in Apple's collection that showed the yellow tint used to enhance the video as shown on black-and-white television sets. The Cavern Club, Shea Stadium, Budokan, Abbey Road Studios and the rooftop of the Apple Corps Headquarters also appear as venues in the game. Fashions of the 1960s were researched to properly apply them to the various virtual crowds at these locations.

Computer-generated concept art (top) was used to create the fantastical "dreamscapes" used in the game, such as this one for "Here Comes the Sun". Some aspects of this art were carried over to the final venues (bottom), such as the blades of grass on the hillside.

Twenty of the game's on-disc songs are associated with "dreamscape" sequences in conjunction with the Abbey Road venue, representing the exclusively studio-based nature of the band in their later years. Animation sequences for songs linked with dreamscapes feature abstract or representative scenery. For example, the sequence for "Octopus's Garden" takes place in an underwater reef, while the sequence for "I Am the Walrus" is reminiscent of the band's psychedelic performance of the song in the 1967 film Magical Mystery Tour. The concept of dreamscapes evolved from brainstorming sessions between Harmonix and Apple Corps.; as Rock Band was a game that celebrated the performance of music, simply portraying the Beatles performing in the Abbey Road studio was not enough, and the dreamscape sequences provided a way to surpass that. While the art team used existing materials as reference, the Apple Corps. shareholders encouraged the team to interpret the songs in new ways. For inspiration, Harmonix looked to Cirque du Soleil's approach in interpreting the Beatles catalogue for the Love stage show. Storyboards for these animated sequences were created using both hand-drawn and 2D computer-generated art. In some cases, the computer-generated elements used in storyboarding were kept as elements in the final venue, such as computer-generated blades of grass in the "Here Comes the Sun" sequence.

The game includes heavily stylized opening and ending cinematics produced in part by Pete Candeland of Passion Pictures, with help from animator Robert Valley and background visuals from Alberto Mielgo. Candeland, who is known for his work animating Gorillaz videos, also produced the opening cinematics for both the original Rock Band and Rock Band 2. Within two and a half minutes, the opening cinematic provides a brief representative history of the band interspersed with numerous references to songs by the Beatles, followed by more metaphorical scenes reflecting their studio albums. Prior to each of the chapters in the game's Story mode, the game presents short introductory animations; these animations were prepared by graphic design studio MK12, who had previously worked on the opening cinematics for movies such as Stranger than Fiction and Quantum of Solace.

=== Promotion ===
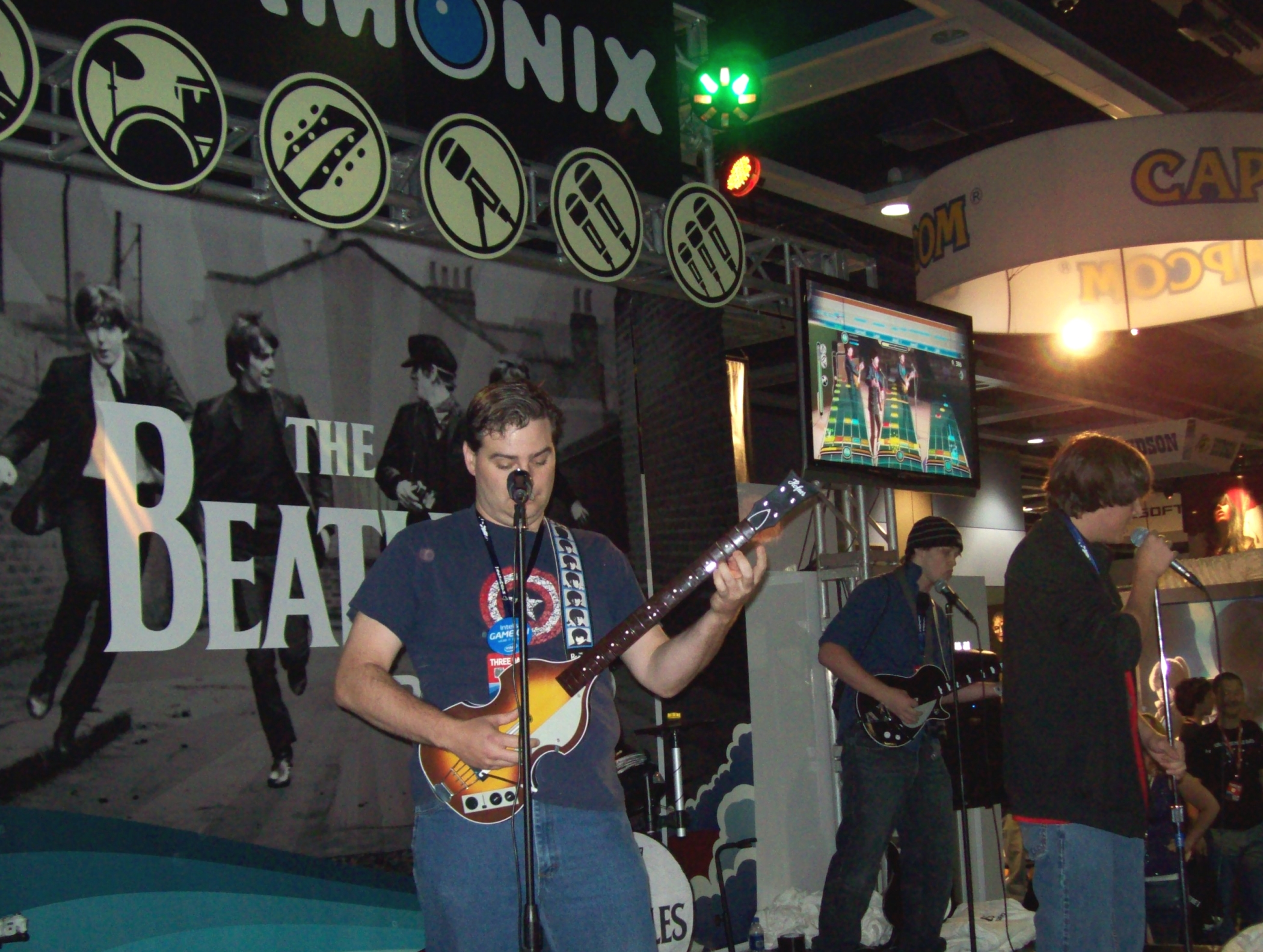
Three people play The Beatles: Rock Band on stage at the Penny Arcade Expo in Seattle, Washington, 4 September 2009.

The Beatles: Rock Band was first revealed on October 30, 2008, when Harmonix, MTV Games, and Viacom announced an exclusive agreement with Apple Corps, Ltd. to produce the standalone title. Prior to this announcement, industry rumours reported that both Harmonix/MTV Games and Activision were vying for the Beatles songs, the latter for the Guitar Hero franchise. The agreement was the result of 17 months of discussions. John Drake, PR spokesperson for Harmonix, stated that Apple Corps "respected and appreciated what Harmonix does creatively for rhythm games" as part of the success of the deal. Eversheds, the legal firm working for Apple Corps. for both The Beatles: Rock Band and the abandoned remake of Yellow Submarine by Disney, stated that it took six months to complete the complex agreements and paperwork over the copyrights, trademarks, and publishing issues. Viacom's deal with the Beatles' property owners includes royalties with a guaranteed minimum of $10 million and upwards of $40 million based on initial sales projections, an amount that chairman Martin Bandier of Sony/ATV Music Publishing has stated to be "not even comparable to anything that has been done before". The licensing of the Beatles' work for the game was considered a critical step in the later negotiations and availability of the band's songs on iTunes about a year after the game's release.

The game was released internationally on September 9, 2009. The game's release was planned to coincide with the release of the new, remastered CD versions of the Beatles albums. Footage from The Beatles: Rock Band was revealed for the first time on April 18, 2009, during Paul McCartney's performance at the Coachella Valley Music and Arts Festival. McCartney continued to utilize gameplay footage during his concert performances while touring during the months prior to the game's release. The game was formally showcased on June 1, 2009, at E3 2009. Presented by Harmonix at the beginning of the Microsoft press conference, Paul McCartney and Ringo Starr briefly took the stage to discuss the games. Yoko Ono and Olivia Harrison also made a brief appearance. The game's E3 demo booth was modeled as a recreation of Abbey Road Studios.

The game's official website was revealed early in 2009, showing only images of the Abbey Road studios and the game's release date. Over time, images of the Beatles' favored instruments appeared in the studio as their game peripheral replicas were announced. On May 5, 2009, the website was updated to include general information and promotional media. Customers who pre-ordered the game from selected vendors received an access code to view exclusive images and media on the site before it was eventually made public.

In August 2009, VH1 Classic aired music videos from the TV special Around the Beatles (1964), the film Help! (1965), and a music video of the "Birthday" gameplay footage, promoting the launch of The Beatles Rock Band online store. This store was also launched by several segments held on the home shopping channel, QVC, for the game, the Beatles' remastered albums, and other related products; several Harmonix employees were present to demonstrate the game.

A video advertisement for the game featuring the song "Come Together" premiered on August 28, 2009. The spot features a live action recreation of the iconic Abbey Road album cover; as the Beatles cross the road, a crowd of people follow, some of whom are carrying the game's controllers. The advertisement was directed by Marcel Langenegger, who worked with Apple Corps and Giles Martin to build an Abbey Road set at a Hollywood studio, and to blend archival footage of the Beatles into the video. Body doubles, vetted by the Apple Corps shareholders, appear in some shots. On September 8, 2009, Dhani Harrison appeared as a guest on The Tonight Show with Conan O'Brien to promote the game. Harrison and O'Brien (along with Tonight Show web manager Aaron Bleyaert and The Tonight Show Band member Mark Pender) performed the song "Birthday" at the close of the show.

== Soundtrack ==
The game includes 45 songs from 12 of the Beatles albums recorded during their 1963–1970 tenure with EMI Records. With the exception of Magical Mystery Tour, track information is based on the British-released versions of the albums. Six non-album singles and the mashup track "Within You Without You/Tomorrow Never Knows" from the 2006 remix album Love have also been included. Selections of the soundtrack are under license from Sony/ATV Music Publishing Company. Although Michael Jackson, who owned 50% of the publishing rights to the Beatles songs through Sony/ATV, died in June 2009, the sale of his estate did not affect the songs or the release schedule of The Beatles: Rock Band, according to Harmonix.

=== Downloadable content ===
Additional songs are available for the game as downloadable content. The song "All You Need Is Love" was first to appear as downloadable content, proceeds from which ($1.40 of the $2 song cost) were donated to Doctors Without Borders. The song was initially made available as an exclusive for Xbox 360 on the same day the game was released. Within two weeks of the game's release, "All You Need Is Love" was announced by Microsoft and MTV to be the fastest-selling downloadable song across any of the Rock Band platforms, with tens of thousands of downloads; The song had been downloaded more than 100,000 times by the end of September, and by February 2010, had generated over $200,000 for the charity. The song is now available for download on the Wii and PlayStation 3.

Full albums were also made available as downloadable content; the remaining songs from Abbey Road, Sgt. Pepper's Lonely Hearts Club Band, and Rubber Soul have since been released on the consoles' respective store services. While there was potential for more of the Beatles catalogue to be made available, this never happened after the first batch of downloadable content. Drake identified the costly development process as a prohibitive factor: "Every time we do one song, it's not like Rock Band where we wait for the masters to come in and just author them... its like, send people to Abbey Road, use the original tape, separate them out... it costs thousands of dollars." Drake asserted that Harmonix would take sales of the currently announced albums into consideration before continuing development of downloadable content. Harmonix's Foster stated that solo acts from the Beatles' members would not be included as downloadable content for The Beatles: Rock Band; however, he did not rule out the possibility of these acts appearing in other Rock Band games. A three pack of songs from Paul McCartney's 2009 live album, Good Evening New York City, was made available for the main Rock Band series on 5 January 2010. John Lennon's "Imagine" is a part of the Rock Band 3 soundtrack, with the full Imagine album arriving later as downloadable content in celebration of Lennon's 70th birthday. A pack featuring Paul McCartney's band Wings was also released as DLC for Rock Band 3 on December 28, 2010.

The respective downloadable content for The Beatles: Rock Band and other currently available Rock Band titles are not cross-compatible. Furthermore, the songs contained on The Beatles are not exportable to other games in the Rock Band series. Harmonix's Chris Foster cited the game's new vocal harmony feature as well as the unique song-specific dreamscape animations as reasons for the lack of exportability to other Rock Band games. John Drake stated that the developer had a responsibility to treat the Beatles' songs as "iconic", and keep its music separated from other songs.

On May 5, 2016, Harmonix ceased downloadable content distribution for The Beatles: Rock Band due to the license expiration, though those that had already purchased the tracks would be able to redownload them in the future.

== Reception ==
Reception

Aggregate scores
Aggregator	Score
GameRankings	90% (Wii); 89.83% (PS3); 89.66% (X360)
Metacritic	89/100 (X360); 88/100 (PS3)

Review scores
Publication	Score
1Up.com	B
Eurogamer	9/10
G4	4/5
Game Informer	8.75/10
GameSpot	9/10
GameSpy	4.5/5
IGN	9.0/10
PALGN	8/10

The Beatles: Rock Band received widespread critical acclaim from several media outlets upon release. Regarding the game's cross-generational appeal, Chad Sapieha of The Globe and Mail suggested that the game would spark a new wave of Beatlemania, while Seth Schiesel of The New York Times called it "nothing less than a cultural watershed". Some critics hailed the title as landmark of the music game genre; Randy Lewis of the Los Angeles Times described the game as a "quantum leap forward for the music video game", while Johnny Minkley of Eurogamer called it "the new standard by which all band-specific game experiences will be judged".

Described as an "interactive Beatles experience", the game was considered to bring players closer to the band through both technical and emotional means. By playing each song's respective note chart, players were said to have a better appreciation for the structure and complexity of the compositions and performances by the Beatles. Emotionally, critics commented on the sentimental values of the game's career mode, recalling the history of the band. Critics were mostly positive concerning the visual and aural elements of the game; G4's Abbie Heppe considered it a preferable package to the newly remastered albums, citing song-specific animations as a strong feature. The dreamscape sequences in particular were likened to live performances, praised as "dazzling" and "evocative". However, Schiesel remarked that due to the players' concentration on the note tracks, the animations "serve mostly to entertain onlookers rather than the players themselves". Heppe observed that the color saturation of the background elements as well as the "Beatlemania" visual effects can sometimes contrast poorly with the scrolling notes, making it difficult to play. After the game's release, Harmonix lead designer Chris Foster acknowledged that the visuals can be "too overwhelming for [some players] at moments". The implementation of three-part harmonies, expressed by some to be the most significant addition to the series, was well received.

Critics primarily found fault with the game's length, as the bulk of the game's content can be completed in only a few hours. Will Tuttle of GameSpy questioned whether Harmonix limited the number of songs on release knowing that there would be a market for the game's downloadable content in the near future. The low number of songs, along with the new themed instrument controllers, were found to make the game an expensive proposition for those new to rhythm games. Due to the limited selection of songs on the disc, some critics questioned the specific inclusion of certain songs or the exclusion of more popular songs. Furthermore, critics claimed that the game's complete dedication to the Beatles, without the option for cross-compatibility with Rock Band or vice versa, can potentially lead to tedious play sessions with minimal variety, hampering the social nature of the game. Justin Haywald of 1UP.com considered that in attaching the Rock Band name to the game's title, there was a certain expectation on an expandable library of songs and interoperability with previous Rock Band titles, which The Beatles: Rock Band failed to meet. Some players coming from previous versions of Rock Band would consider the songs in The Beatles: Rock Band to lack technical challenge. However, the less difficult note tracks were seen to be a welcoming benefit for newcomers to the series as well as those attempting to sing along with the harmony portions of the game. For purist fans, some critics noted that the game purposely avoids certain aspects of the Beatles' history; former band members such as Pete Best or collaborators such as Billy Preston or Eric Clapton are never seen during gameplay. Concerning supplemental content, Hilary Goldstein of IGN felt the extra features could have been more substantial, especially in comparison to the additional material that accompanies the remastered CDs.

PC World listed The Beatles: Rock Band as their ninth Best Product of 2009. The game won for Best Music Game on the Spike Video Game Awards 2009. During the 13th Annual Interactive Achievement Awards, The Beatles: Rock Band was awarded "Family Game of the Year" by the Academy of Interactive Arts & Sciences; it also received a nomination for "Outstanding Achievement in Soundtrack". The game was also nominated for the Best Audio Game Developers Choice Award. The game's official website, published by Harmonix, won the Games-Related category for the 14th Annual Webby Awards. In 2010, the game was included as one of the titles in the book 1001 Video Games You Must Play Before You Die.

The Beatles: Rock Band was used as a finale for each performance of the 125th anniversary season of the Boston Pops Orchestra; the orchestra led the audience in a sing-along to several songs by the Beatles played by the orchestra but synchronized to the visuals from the game.

=== E3 reception ===
The transition from the song "Here Comes the Sun" to "I Am the Walrus" in the opening cinematic for The Beatles: Rock Band

The Beatles: Rock Band was well received at the 2009 E3 Convention, and was named the Best Music/Rhythm Game by GameSpot, GameSpy, 1UP.com, and X-Play; the game was also nominated for Best Music or Rhythm game by the Game Critics Awards and IGN. The opening animation video, released at the same time as E3, was praised by the press. It has been described as "surreal" by both the Los Angeles Times and Boing Boing's Offworld blog. Frames Per Second called it "simply stunning", and the Entertainment Weekly blog PopWatch described it as "damned spiffy". The second half of the video, where traditional animation gives way to a combination of computer-aided 2D and 3D scenery has been described as "a mashup of Peter Max and the Unreal Engine... chaperoned by the ghost of Salvador Dalí" by the ECA's GameCulture blog. The opening video was awarded the 2009 British Animation Award for "Best Commissioned Animation" and won a Silver Clio Award in the field of "Television/Cinema/Digital Technique".

=== Sales ===
According to Viacom CEO Philippe Dauman, one quarter of The Beatles: Rock Band inventory was sold during its first week of release, exceeding their expectations. Dauman attributed some success of the game's sales to the price reduction of the PlayStation 3, which occurred a few weeks before the release of The Beatles: Rock Band.

The Beatles: Rock Band was the fourth high-selling game across all platforms in its first week of release in the United Kingdom. According to the NPD Group, The Beatles: Rock Band sold 595,000 units across all offerings for the Xbox 360, Wii, and PlayStation 3 versions during September 2009, respectively in the United States, making the game the 5th, 10th, and 20th top sellers for the month, respectively; only Guitar Hero 5 for the Xbox 360 placed in the top 10 titles selling 210,800 units. Total sales across all platforms in the United States was 595,000 units with revenue between $59 and 60 million, and was the second highest revenue-generating game behind Halo 3: ODST driven by sales of the bundled units. Though MTV Games was pleased with the sales performance of the game, the sales numbers fell short of the projected values by industry analysts, attributing it to the slow recovery of the video game market from the late-2000s recession. As of December 2009, Harmonix has stated that the game has sold more than 3 million copies worldwide. NPD Group data through the end of 2009 reported North American sales of the game at 1.18 and 1.7 million. In considering the comparison of The Beatles: Rock Band sales in North America to the nearly 1 million units sold by Guitar Hero 5, the magazine Advertising Age identified the ability of MTV Games and Harmonix to leverage the music of the Beatles and their other partners in novel and experimental methods among more traditional means. In an October 2010 interview Alex Rigopulos claimed that The Beatles: Rock Band sales were "respectable", having sold "well over three million units", though had not exceeded sales of other Rock Band games.
