= Gretsch =

American musical instrument manufacturer

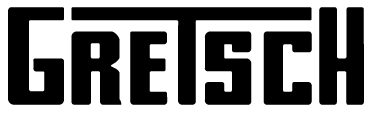
- Type: Private
- Industry: Musical instruments
- Founded: 1883; 143 years ago in Brooklyn, New York City
- Founder: Friedrich Gretsch
- Headquarters: Savannah, Georgia, United States
- Key people: List: Friedrich Gretsch (founder, d. 1885) drums.; Fred Gretsch Sr. (Friedrich's successor); Fred Gretsch Jr.; William Walter "Bill" Gretsch (former President); Fred W. Gretsch (President)
- Products: Current: Electric and acoustic guitars, basses, ukuleles, drum kits; Former: Lap steel guitars, banjos, mandolins, amplifiers
- Divisions: Gretsch Drums; Gretsch Guitars
- Website: Gretsch.com

Gretsch is an American company that manufactures and markets musical instruments. The company was founded in 1883 in Brooklyn, New York, by Friedrich Gretsch, a 27-year-old German immigrant, shortly after his arrival to the United States. Friedrich Gretsch manufactured banjos, tambourines, and drums until his death in 1895. In 1916, his son, Fred Gretsch Sr., moved operations to a larger facility where Gretsch went on to become a prominent manufacturer of American musical instruments. Through the years, Gretsch has manufactured a wide range of instruments, though they currently focus on electric and acoustic guitars and drums.

Gretsch instruments enjoyed market prominence by the 1950s. In 1954, Gretsch began a collaboration with guitarist Chet Atkins to manufacture a line of electric guitars with Atkins' endorsement, resulting in the Gretsch 6120 hollowbody guitar and other later models such as the Country Gentleman. Electric guitars before 1957 used single coil pickups that have significant hum problems as an inherent part of their design. Frustration with the hum of these pickups prompted Atkins to collaborate with American inventor and engineer Ray Butts on the development of a new "humbucking" pickup by connecting two single-coil pickups serially and out of phase. This resulted in what may have been the first humbucker pickup (a claim lost to Gibson Guitars because Gibson was able to file a patent for their humbucker design first). Butts' design became the Gretsch Filter'Tron and was used on Gretsch guitars beginning in 1957, and is highly regarded for its unique sound properties. The popularity of Gretsch guitars soared in the mid-1960s because of its association with Beatles guitarist George Harrison, who played Gretsch guitars beginning in the band's early years.

== History ==
=== Beginnings ===
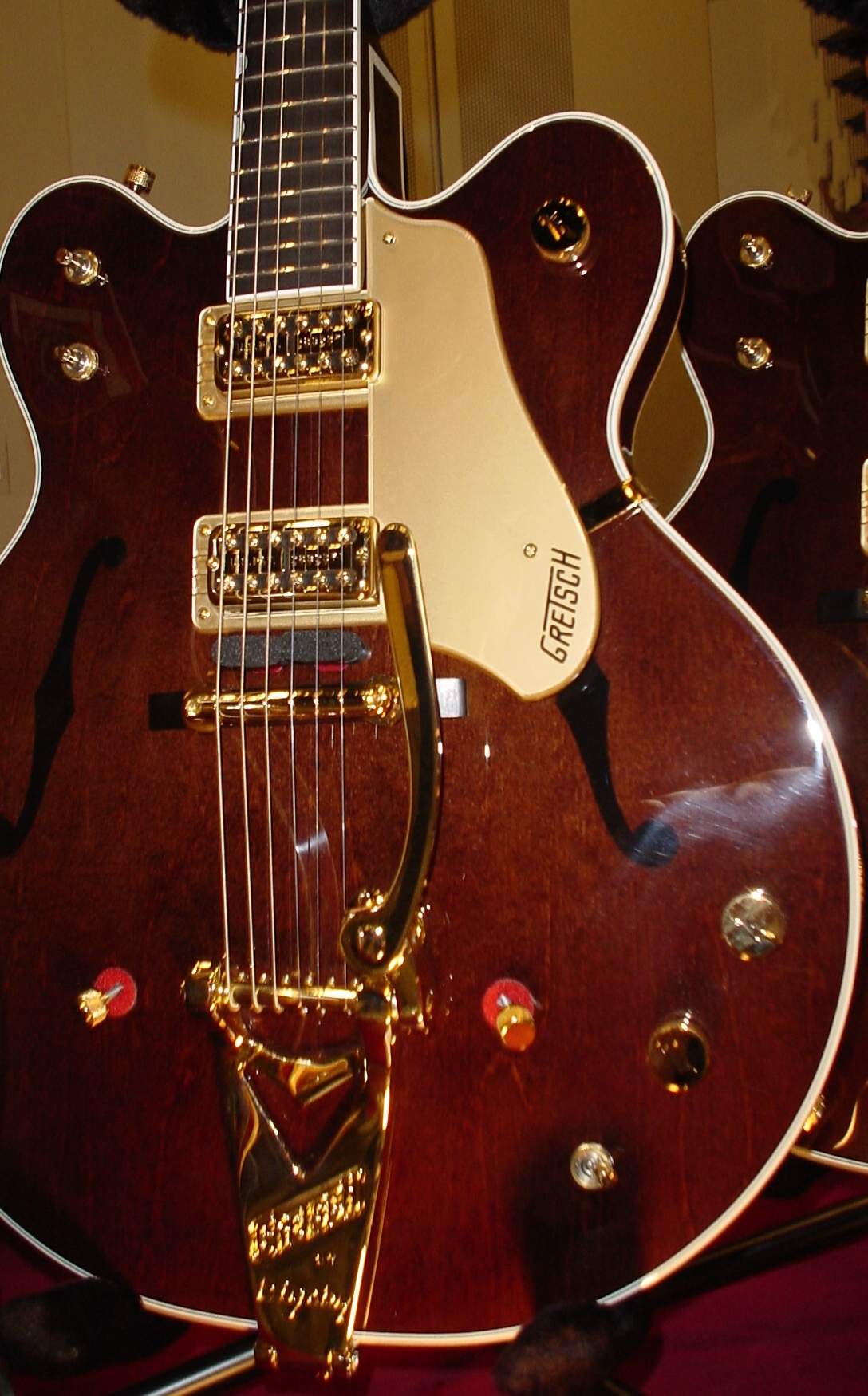
A G6122-1962 Chet Atkins Country Gentleman model

Gretsch was founded in 1883 by Friedrich Gretsch, a young German immigrant who opened his own musical instrument shop on 128 Middleton Street in Brooklyn, New York, that year. His shop was designed for the manufacture of banjos, tambourines and drums, with the company experiencing some success catering to marching bands. The operation moved to South 4th Street in 1894. In 1895, Gretsch died at the age of 39 and the company was taken over by his wife and fifteen-year-old son Fred.

Fred Gretsch expanded the business, incorporating it and adding Gretsch Building #1 at 109 South 5th Street in 1903, Gretsch Building #2 at 104-114 South 4th Street in 1910, and a new ten-story Gretsch Building #4 at 60 Broadway in 1916. The company ultimately owned or operated six properties in the immediate area, including a warehouse on Dunham Place. Gretsch Building #4 was owned by the Gretsch family until 1999.

The first Gretsch branded guitar was produced in 1928, but was one of 3000 instruments in the Gretsch catalog, with it still being primarily a drum company.

WWII marked a transitional period for Gretsch when Fred Gretsch Sr. handed over the family business to his son, Fred Gretsch Jr., after retiring in 1942. Soon after taking over, Fred Jr. left to serve as a Navy commander, leaving the business in the hands of his younger brother, William Walter "Bill" Gretsch. Bill Gretsch died in 1948 and the company was again run by Fred Jr.

In the post-war period, Gretsch brought a greater focus on electric guitars. Fred Jr and Gretsch employees Christopher 'Duke' Kramer and Jimmie Webster worked with Chet Atkins to overhaul the look and sound of Gretsch electric guitars.

=== 1950s & 1960s ===
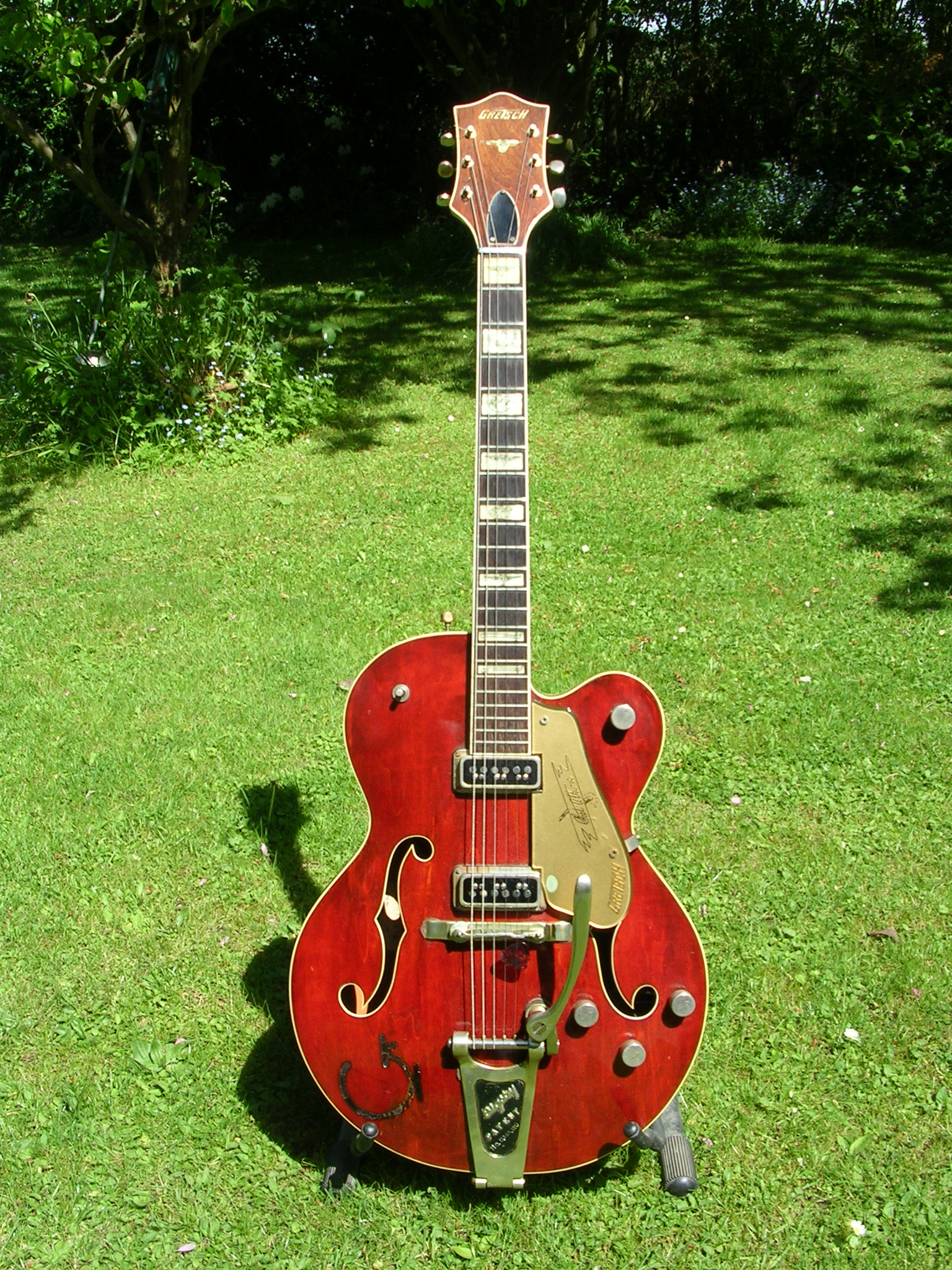
1955 Chet Atkins 6120

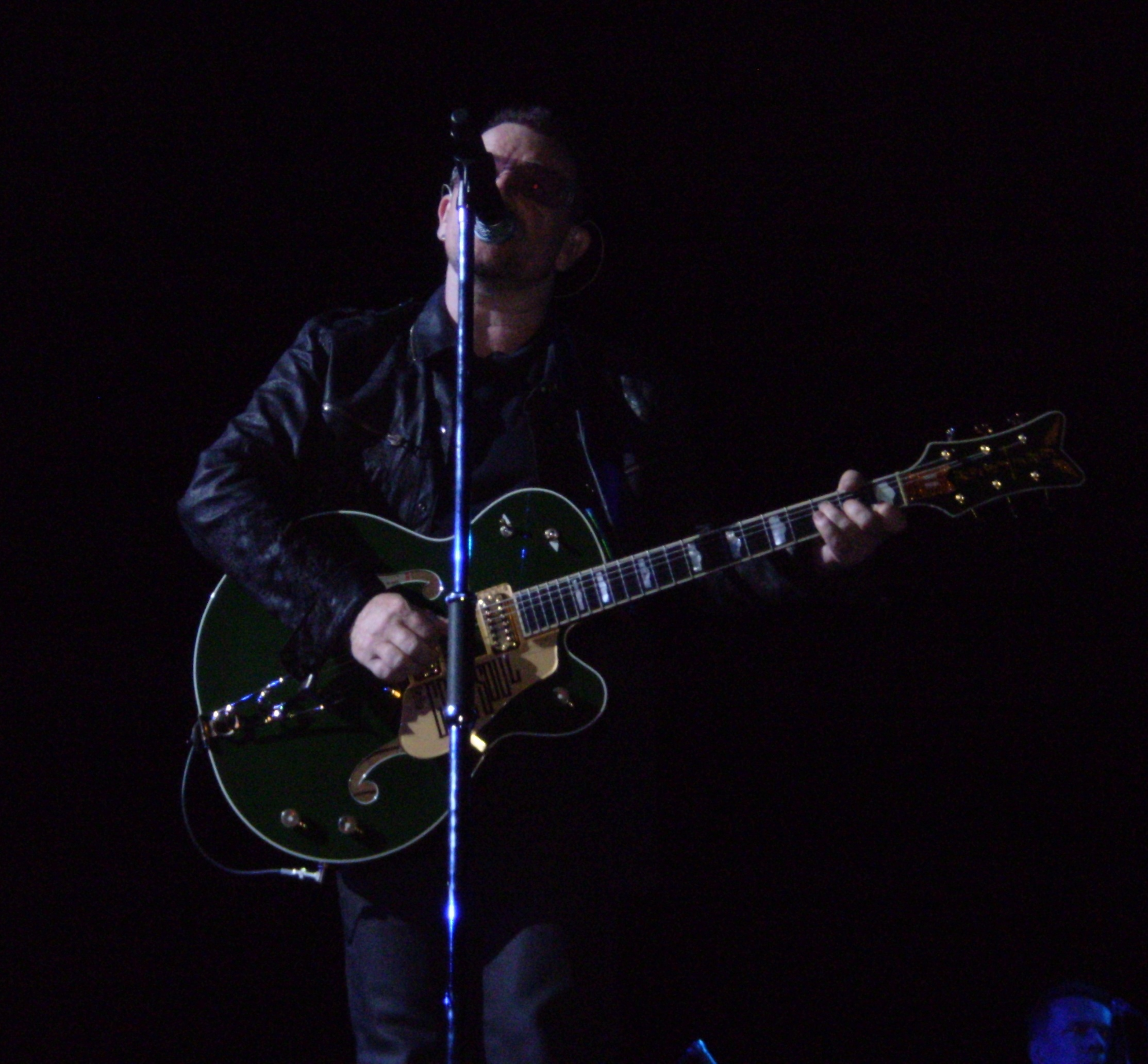
Bono playing a Gretsch Irish Falcon

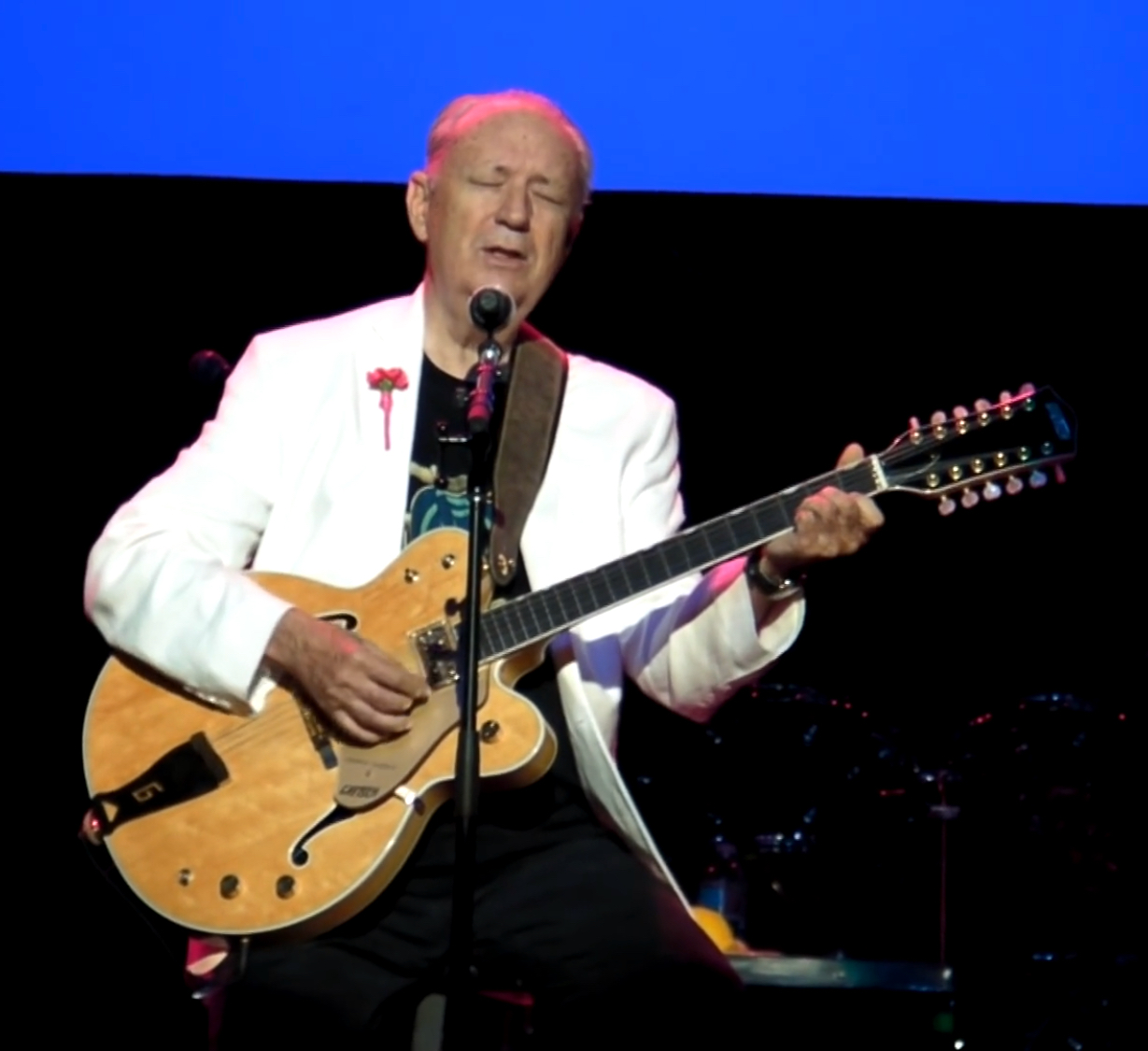
Former Monkees guitarist Michael Nesmith plays his signature model Gretsch Model 6076.

By the mid-1950s the company had introduced several models, including the 6120 "Nashville", and the 6128 Duo Jet chambered "solid body", which was played by Bo Diddley. Two other models were introduced - the Country Club, and the White Falcon.

In 1954, Webster suggested adding the sparkle finishes from Gretsch drums onto their guitars, resulting in the Gretsch Sparkle Jet. He was also inspired by the American cars of the era in introducing new finishes to their guitars.

During this time, Chet Atkins became an endorser of Gretsch and they sold guitars with Atkins' name on the pickguard. Atkins' endorsement, along with the use of Gretsch guitars by rock n roll artists such as Eddie Cochran and Duane Eddy, helped increase sales of Gretsch guitars.

After The Beatles' first appearance on The Ed Sullivan Show, Gretsch sales soared overnight, due to George Harrison playing a Gretsch Country Gentleman for the performance.

A Gretsch guitar was also played by Hilton Valentine for The Animals' House of the Rising Sun (1964).

=== Sale to Baldwin, Gretsch family regains interest ===
Fred Gretsch never found a suitable successor, and in 1967 Gretsch was sold to Baldwin Pianos, becoming a subsidiary of that firm. Mid-1969, Baldwin moved Gretsch instrument manufacturing operations from Brooklyn to a plant in DeQueen, Arkansas.

In 1983, Baldwin's holding company and several of its subsidiaries were forced into bankruptcy. At the time it was the largest bankruptcy ever, with a total debt of over $9 billion. In 1984, former Baldwin CEO Richard Harrison bought the Baldwin music divisions and brought back former Gretsch employee, Duke Kramer, to run the Gretsch division.

In 1985, the Gretsch company once again came under the leadership of the Gretsch family when Fred W. Gretsch, great-grandson of Friedrich and nephew of Fred Gretsch Jr, assumed presidency of the company. The first Gretsch guitars after Fred W Gretsch became president were released in 1988. They were a series of Traveling Wilburys commemorative guitars, which bore little resemblance to prior Gretsch models. In 1989, Gretsch restarted large-scale production of new guitars based on classic Gretsch models.

In 1999, the Bigsby Electric Guitars brand was sold to Gretsch. In 2019, Gretsch sold the Bigsby brand to Fender.

=== Fender control ===
In late 2002, Gretsch and the Fender Musical Instruments Corporation reached an agreement giving Fender control over marketing, production, and distribution of guitars, with the Gretsch family retaining ownership of the company.

== Guitars ==
=== Models ===
- Gretsch 6120, Chet Atkins
- Gretsch G1627 Synchromatic Sparkle Jet. The guitar best known for being used by Matt Bellamy of Muse.
- Gretsch 6128 Duo Jet
- Gretsch G6131 Jet Firebird
- Gretsch G6131MY Signature Jet (Malcolm Young Edition)
- Gretsch 6136 White Falcon
- Gretsch 6199 Jupiter Thunderbird
- Gretsch BST 1000
- Gretsch 6119 Tennessean
- Gretsch 6124, 6125 Anniversary (single pickup)
- Gretsch 6117, 6118 Double Anniversary (double pickup)
- Gretsch 6122 Country Gentleman

== See also ==
- Sho-Bud – Brand of pedal steel guitars owned by Gretsch

== Bibliography ==
- Bacon, T. (2005). (Ed.). 50 Years of Gretsch Electrics. Backbeat Books. San Francisco. ISBN 0-87930-822-2.
- Bacon, T. (2000). (Ed.). Fuzz & Feedback: Classic Guitar Music of the 60's. Miller Freeman Books. San Francisco. ISBN 0-87930-612-2.
- Bacon, T. (2015). The Gretsch Electric Guitar Book: 60 Years of White Falcons, 6120s, Jets, Gents, and More. Backbeat Books. Milwaukee. ISBN 978-1-4803-9924-2
- Howe, Z. (2014). (Ed.). Barbed Wire Kisses: The Jesus and Mary Chain Story. Polygon. Edinburgh. ISBN 978-1-84697-331-4.

== See also ==
- Gretch (disambiguation)
