= Bigsby vibrato tailpiece =

Device for electric guitars

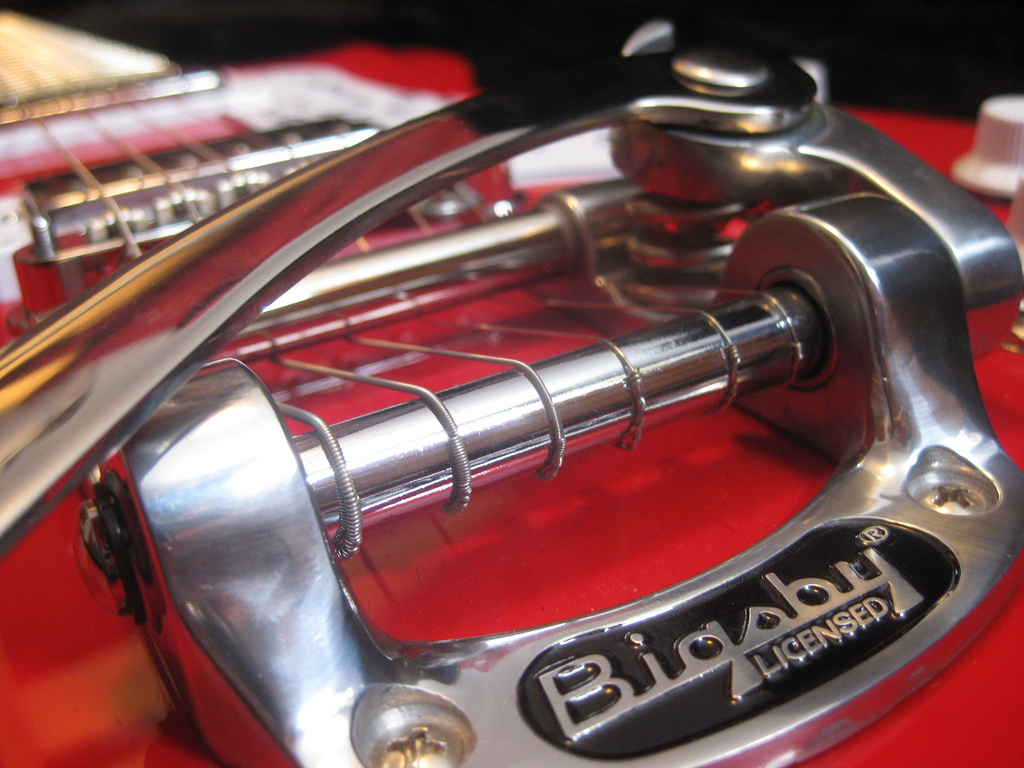
Bigsby B50 tremolo hardware

The Bigsby vibrato tailpiece (or Bigsby for short) is a mechanical vibrato device for electric guitar designed by Paul Bigsby and produced by the Bigsby Electric Guitar Company. The device allows the picking hand to bend the pitch of notes or entire chords for various musical effects, and enabled greater subtlety and smoother control than earlier vibrato systems while more effectively staying in tune despite repeated string bending.

Bigsby was inspired to create a new vibrato system after being tasked by Merle Travis to repair the Kauffman Vibrola vibrato on his Gibson L-10. The first system went to Travis in 1951. By the mid-1950s, Bigsby had ceased production of his own guitars to focus on producing a range of vibrato tailpieces.

== Design ==
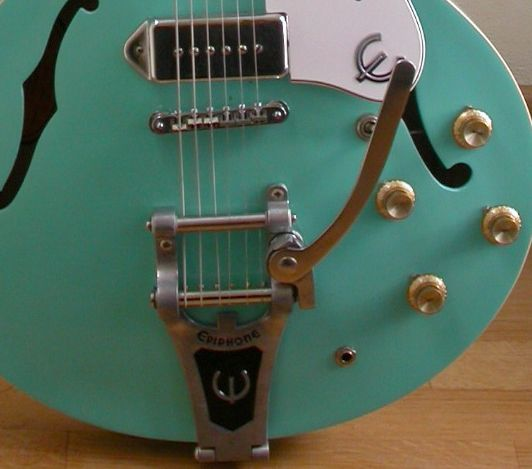
Epiphone Casino VT with a Bigsby

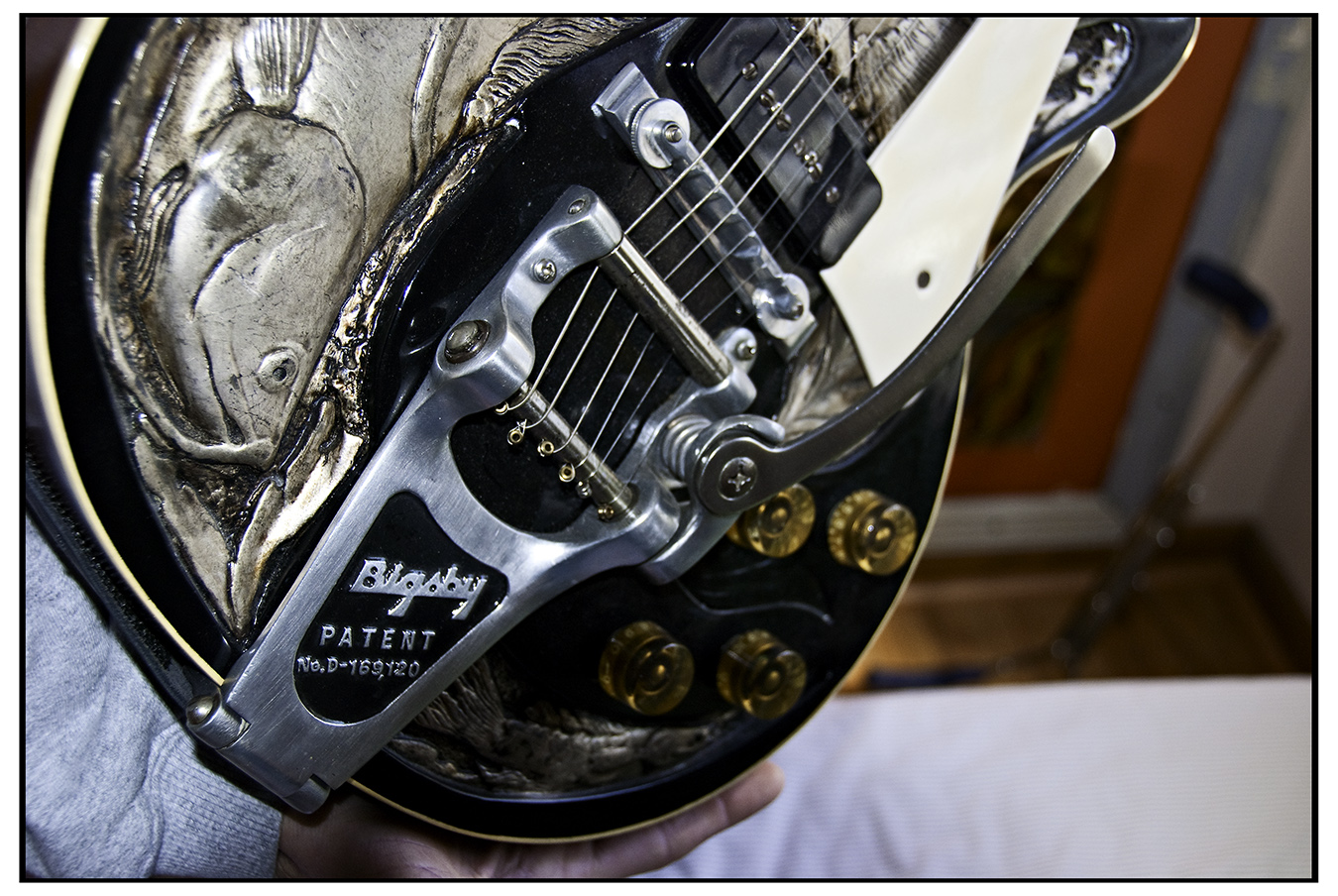
Gibson Les Paul with a Bigsby

The Bigsby vibrato unit is installed on the guitar top, and includes a rocking rather than roller bridge. The lever arm of a Bigsby is spring-loaded and attached to a pivoting metal bar, around which the strings of the guitar are installed. In the neutral position the pressure of the spring counterbalances the pull of the strings, maintaining a neutral pitch. When the arm of the Bigsby is pushed the bridge rocks forward [no it doesn't. the strings move across the top of the bridge saddles], causing the strings to loosen and lowering their pitch. Lifting the arm raises the pitch of the strings.

The Bigsby is highly controllable within its range of motion and usually requires little force to operate. It is ideally suited to musicians who use slow, subtle, or extended bends. It has limited range compared to vibrato units using longer internal springs, such as the Floyd Rose and Fender “strat-style” synchronized tremolo.

Bigsby vibratos are still factory-installed on a variety of electric guitars, including certain instruments branded as PRS (Starla), Epiphone, Fender, Gibson, Gretsch, Guild, Hamer, Ibanez, and Schecter Guitar Research, as well as luthiers companies such as MotorAve. Many electric guitars can also be retrofitted with a Bigsby, which requires no additional routing, but may require additional holes to be drilled. Adapters, such as the models sold by Vibramate, can be used to install a Bigsby Vibrato on a guitar without drilling any holes. Variations in guitars, such as between flat top and archtop, require different models of Bigsby.

== See also ==
- Vibrato systems for guitar
- Tailed bridge guitar
