= List of guitar manufacturers =

This is a non-exhaustive list of Wikipedia articles about brand-name companies (past and present) that have sold guitars and the house brands occasionally used.

This list does not include guitar manufacturers without a Wikipedia article and excludes most custom-only shops (as they are generally not manufacturing at scale).

== A ==
- Airline
- Alembic
- Alvarez
- Ampeg
- Antoria
- Aria
- Ashton Music
- Avalon

== B ==
- Babicz
- Bailey, John
- Bartell
- B.C. Rich
- Behringer
- Blackbird
- Blade
- Bohemian
- Bond Electraglide
- Breedlove
- Burns

== C ==
- C.R. Alsip
- Campbell
- Caparison
- C.F. Martin
- Chapman
- Charvel
- Chesbro
- Cole Clark
- Collings
- Conde
- Cort

== D ==
- D'Alegria
- D'Angelico
- Daisy Rock Girl
- Danelectro
- Dean
- Diamond
- D'Aquisto, Jimmy
- Dobro
- Duesenberg

== E ==
- Eastwood
- Eccleshall
- Eko
- El Degas
- Electra
- Electrical
- Epiphone
- Ernie Ball
- ESP

== F ==
- Fano
- Farida
- Fender
- Fernandes
- First Act
- Flaxwood
- Floyd Rose
- Fodera
- Framus
- Freshman
- Freedom
- Fret-King
- FujiGen
- Furch

== G ==
- G&L
- Gallotone
- Garrison
- Giannini
- Gibson
- Gilberto Grácio
- Gittler
- Godin
- Gordon-Smith
- Greco
- Greg Bennett
- Gretsch
- Guild
- Guyatone

== H ==
- Hagström
- Hallmark Guitars
- Hamer
- Harley Benton
- Harmony
- Heritage
- Höfner
- Hohner
- Hondo
- Hora
- Huss & Dalton Guitar Co.

== I ==
- Ibanez
- Italia

== J ==
- Jackson
- James Tyler
- Jay Turser
- Jeffrey Yong
- Jon Kammerer Guitars
- Joseph Lukes
- Jolana

== K ==
- Kalamazoo
- Kawai
- Kay
- Ken Parker
- Kent
- Kiesel
- Klira
- Koll
- Kramer
- Kustom

== L ==
- Lado
- Lâg
- Lakland
- Larrivée
- Levin
- Lichty
- Lindert
- Line 6
- Lipe
- Lotus
- Lowden
- Luna
- Lyle

== M ==
- Maestro
- Mann
- Maton
- Matsumoku
- Mayones
- Michael Kelly
- Micro-Frets
- Modulus
- Moniker
- Mosrite
- MotorAve
- Music Man

== N ==
- National

== P ==
- Parker
- Paulino Bernabe II
- Peavey
- Penco
- Petros
- PRS

== R ==
- RainSong
- Ramírez
- Recording King
- Reverend
- Rickenbacker
- Riversong Guitars
- Robin
- Ruokangas

== S ==
- Samick
- Sadowsky
- Santa Cruz
- Schecter
- Seagull
- Shergold
- Sigma
- Silvertone
- Smith
- Solar Guitars
- Spector
- Squier
- Stagg
- Steinberger
- Stella
- Suhr
- Supersound Electronic Products
- Suzuki

== T ==
- Tacoma
- Tagima
- Takamine
- Tanglewood
- Taylor
- Teisco
- Teton
- Tobias
- Tokai
- Tom Anderson
- Tonante
- Travis Bean
- Trembita
- TYM

== U ==
- Univox

== V ==
- Valco
- Valley Arts
- Vantage
- Vigier
- Vintage
- VOX

== W ==
- Walden
- Warwick
- Washburn
- Westfield
- Westone
- William Laskin

== Y ==
- Yamaha
- Yairi

== Z ==
- Zemaitis
- Zon
