= Desireé Bassett =

American singer (born 1992)

Desiree Apolonio Ragoza (Bassett)
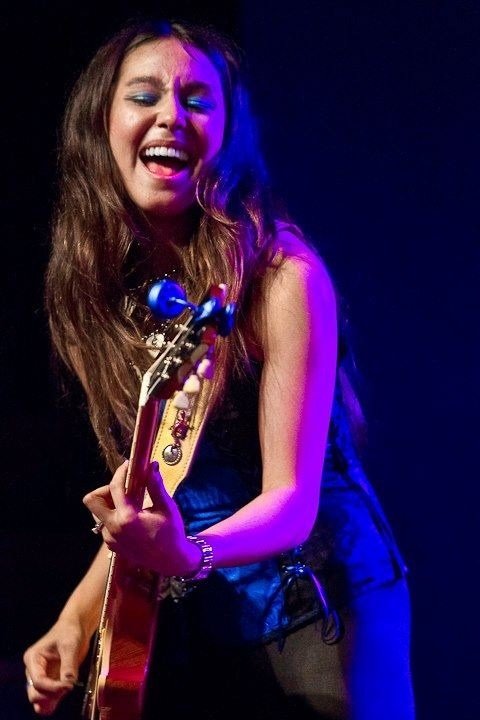
- Desiree Ragoza (Bassett) performing at the Palace Theater in Stafford Springs, CT on April 27, 2013

Background information
- Born: Desiree' Apolonio Bassett; September 11, 1992 (age 33); New Haven, Connecticut, U.S.
- Origin: Ashford, Connecticut
- Genres: Hard rock; R&B; Blues; pop; Electronic; Metal
- Occupations: Guitarist; Singing; Songwriter
- Instruments: Electric guitar; Acoustic Guitar; Vocals
- Years active: 2003–present
- Label: Desiree Bassett LLC (independent)
- Website: desireeragoza.com

Desiree Apolonio Ragoza (Bassett) (born September 11, 1992) is an American rock guitarist and recording artist. She has performed alongside mainline performers such as Sammy Hagar, Ted Nugent, Living Colour, Barry Goudreau, the Marshall Tucker Band, Jennifer Batten, Vinnie Moore, Uli Jon Roth, Andy Aledort, Devon Allman, James Montgomery, members of the Allman Brothers Band, among others. She has released two studio albums and has performed on both coasts of the United States. Now married, she continues to pursue her music career writing songs for her next coming albums as well as performing in a multitude of groups.

== Early life ==
Ragoza (Bassett) was born in New Haven, Connecticut to Daniel (who also acted as her manager) and Myrna Bassett. At 2 years old, Ragoza's musical ability was encouraged by her parents after hearing her sing herself to sleep singing Reba McEntire songs. A year later, she began playing a half-size Lotus guitar.

By the time she was 5, her father began training her on a full-sized 1983 Ibanez Roadstar II. At 8, she played her first competition at the local fair grounds playing a Joe Satriani cover, coming in second place. At the age of nine, she began taking singing and guitar lessons at the University of Connecticut music program, where it was discovered she had perfect pitch and could play by ear. She soon began giving lessons herself. Ragoza counts among her influences Jeff Beck, Rik Emmett, Jimi Hendrix, Reba McEntire, the Allman Brothers and her personal idol Joe Satriani.

== 2005–2008 ==
After Ragoza (Bassett) performed on the side stage at Ozzfest in Hartford, CT, she started playing open mic events around Connecticut. Bassist Doug Wimbish discovered her at an open mic in Hartford, Connecticut and invited her to play at his annual Wim-Bash the following night. Now she plays shows in Connecticut, Massachusetts, New York, and Vermont and performs alongside artists like Living Colour, Andy Aledort, some members of the Allman Brothers Band, Johnny Vibrato, Pete Scheips Band, and the XY Eli Band. Bassett, in August 2005, recorded five songs, performing all of the instruments; selling several hundred copies of the self-made CD.

In September 2005, Ragoza played an event at the Meriden Motorcycle Club and an event in Ashford. The resulting group, the Time Machine, was initially composed of bassist David Stoltz (later Rob Laramie), a former member of the Dickey Betts Band and Robert Gottfried. By November, she had built a local following. In December 2005 she took second place at the Olympics of Entertainment in New York City. She played gigs in Hartford CT, with Kal David, Andy Aledort, and the band Living Colour before several hundred fans. Shortly afterwards, she performed at the 2006 Winter NAMM Show in Anaheim, California. Sponsorship followed from Peavey Amps., Schecter Guitar Research, and production agreements from Nova Sound Studios and Long View Farm Studios recording studios in North Brookfield, Massachusetts. When she returned the following year to play at the NAMM Show, she was introduced as "the future of rock and roll."

In 2008, Ragoza (Bassett) sat in with the Marshall Tucker Band at a benefit concert in Willimantic, Connecticut, and began developing her first CD, Power & Force. During production, she continued performing locally, and in August 2008, opened for Jimmie Vaughan, Stevie Ray Vaughan's brother. Shortly afterward, Ragoza (Bassett) played lead guitar for Sammy Hagar and his band at the MGM Grand Foxwoods Casino.

== Power and Force ==
Ragoza (Bassett) released her first CD in 2008, at the age of 16. The CD was later remixed and remastered, renamed and released as Power & Force Volume II just before 2009. After the release of Power & Force Vol. II, Ragoza (Bassett) began working on her third CD while playing at the Wolf Den at Mohegan Sun Casino in Uncasville, Connecticut. That month, Ragoza (Bassett) also performed at the Woodstock's 40th anniversary music festival where she covered Jimi Hendrix's version of "The Star-Spangled Banner" with original percussionist Geraldo Velez on drums, ending the night with the song "Purple Haze". Shortly afterwards, she formed the independent label, "Desiree Bassett LLC" with her father. Her band, Desiree and The Time Machine, is Robert Gottfried and Robert Laramie, who replaced Stolz in 2008.

== Cirque du Soleil ==
For 3 years, Ragoza (Bassett) performed as the lead guitarist on tour with Cirque du Soleil's Michael Jackson: The Immortal World Tour which premiered in Montreal on October 2, 2011, and featured some of Michael Jackson's original band members who have toured alongside him for over 30 years before he had passed. With Ragoza (Bassett) on lead guitar, the tour has performed over 500 shows in 141 cities in North America, Europe, Asia and Oceania and hit the box offices of being the 7th highest grossing tour of over $374 million. The show closed after 501 performances on August 31, 2014, in Guadalajara, Mexico .

== Themes and musical style ==
Ragoza (Bassett) considers herself primarily an instrumental player, citing the influence of Satriani's music on her. In Power & Force II, she sings on just three of the 10 songs — "Another Day," "Never Back Down" and "Love Her"; her third album will feature lyrics in about half of the 13 tracks.

In their evaluation of Power & Force, the Russian online music magazine Darkside notes that Bassett's style of play "brings back some echoes of such masters of rock guitar, like Jimi Hendrix and Jimmy Page."

Her current style now still remains with Joe Satriani style as well as Jimi Hendrix, Rik Emmett, Jeff Beck and more but has since then also pursued with other avenues of heavy rock/metal and electronic incorporated.

== Personal life ==
Ragoza (Bassett) owns over 23 guitars, one of which has been signed by Chickenfoot.

Ragoza (Bassett) attended Ashford School in Ashford, Connecticut, until eighth grade and E. O. Smith High School in Storrs, Connecticut, graduating in 2010. She has a brother, Justin and a younger sister Jessica.

Ragoza also notes a fondness for riding All-terrain vehicles and dirt bikes on her family's 12-acre (4.9 ha) property ever since she was five years old.

== Discography ==
- Power & Force (2008)
- Power & Force Vol. II (2009)
- A Bit Above (2010)
- Artificial – Single release (February 27, 2021)
