= ICZ =

ICZ may refer to:

- -icz, Polish for "son of"; see Family name affixes
- iCZ technology, used in Babicz Guitars
- Indolocarbazole
- International Congress of Zookeepers
- International Construction Zimbabwe, division of Murray & Roberts; see Manyuchi Dam
- Intertropical Convergence Zone, or the doldrums, a windless area of the Earth
- Israelitische Cultusgemeinde Zürich (ICZ), the largest Jewish community of Switzerland
