= Tym =

Tym or TYM may refer to:

- Tym (Ob), a river in Krasnoyarsk Krai and Tomsk Oblast, Russia
- Tym (Sakhalin), a river on Sakhalin Island, Russia
- Alice Tym (born 1942), American tennis player
- Stanisław Tym (1937–2024), Polish artist, directory and writer
- Joseph John "Tym" Tymczyszyn (1918–1999), American test pilot
- TYM Guitars, an Australian guitar manufacturer
- TYM (company), a South Korean agricultural machinery manufacturing company
- Taughmonagh Young Men, football club
- Tu Yaa Main, a 2026 Indian Hindi-language survival film by Bejoy Nambiar
- Toro y Moi, an American singer and songwritier
