= Freshman (disambiguation) =

A freshman is a first-year student.

Freshman or Freshmen (or The Freshman or The Freshmen) may also refer to:

== Film and television ==
- The Freshman (1925 film), a Harold Lloyd film
- The Freshman (1990 film), a film starring Marlon Brando and Matthew Broderick
- "The Freshman" (Buffy the Vampire Slayer)
- "The Freshmen", a Gossip Girl episode
- The Freshman (Première année), a 2018 French film directed by Thomas Lilti

== Music ==
- Freshman Guitars, a Scottish guitar company launched in 2002
- The Freshmen (band), an Irish showband
- Freshmen (album), by Nesian Mystik
- "The Freshmen" (song), by The Verve Pipe
- The Freshmen, a music discussion program on MTVu

== Print ==
- Freshmen (comics)
- Freshmen (magazine)

== See also ==
- The Four Freshmen
