= Budda Amplification =

American guitar amplifier and pedal manufacturer

Budda Amplification is an American company that designs and manufactures electric guitar amplifiers and effects pedals, founded by chief designer Jeff Bober and Scot Sierin 1995. After its creation, the company debuted its first amplifier, the 18-watt Class A/B Twinmaster Ten, at the NAMM show the following year, receiving orders for 65 units despite not having the facilities to make them. The Twinmaster's success led to broader interest in low-wattage "boutique" amplifiers and the success of the company. Budda has since released the Superdrive line in a variety of higher wattage models, the discontinued Dual Stage, Stringmaster, and an updated 10th anniversary reissue of the Twinmaster Ten. Their pedals include the BudWah wah wah pedal and the Zenman and Phatman distortion pedals.

The Budda brand is now owned and manufactured by Peavey Electronics.
