= Seiler Pianofortefabrik GmbH =

German piano manufacturer

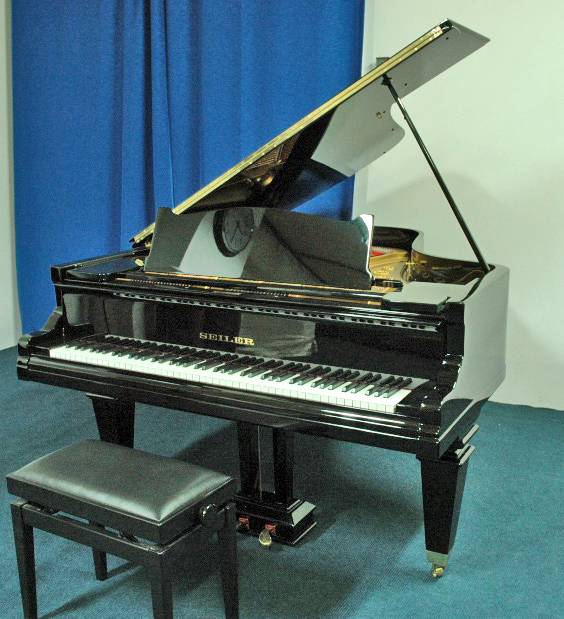
- Company type: Private
- Industry: Musical instruments
- Founded: 1849; 177 years ago
- Founder: Eduard Seiler
- Headquarters: Kitzingen, Germany
- Products: Pianos
- Owner: Samick
- Website: Seiler-pianos.com/

Seiler Pianofortefabrik GmbH is a piano manufacturer in Kitzingen, Germany.

The company was founded by Eduard Seiler in 1849 in Liegnitz, Silesia. By 1923 Seiler was producing up to 3,000 pianos per year, and became the largest piano manufacturer in Eastern Europe. After World War II and the loss of its production facilities, the company moved, first to Denmark and then, from 1961 onward, to the Bavarian town of Kitzingen. In 2008, the company was sold to Samick, a South Korean company. The company emphasizes that the instruments will always be manufactured separately with the Seiler line made in Germany.

Seiler now produces about 1,000 pianos annually between the Seiler brand, the mid-level Eduard Seiler brand, and the entry-level Johannes Seiler brand.

== Current Grand Piano Models ==
Model	Length	Weight
278 Konzert	278 cm	550 kg
242 Konzert	242 cm	490 kg
208 Professional	208 cm	385 kg
186 Maestro	186 cm	320 kg
186 Westminster	186 cm	320 kg
186 Louvre	186 cm	320 kg
186 Prado	186 cm	320 kg
186 Florenz	186 cm	320 kg
168 Virtuoso	168 cm	290 kg

== Current Upright Piano Models ==
Model	Height	Weight
132 Konzert	132 cm	270 kg
132 Konzert "B"	132 cm	270 kg
126 Konsole	126 cm	235 kg
122 Konsole	124 cm	225 kg
122 Primus	125 cm	224 kg
116 Konsole	117 cm	215 kg
116 Primus	117 cm	215 kg
112 Modern	114 cm	205 kg
126 Attraction	126 cm	245 kg
126 Impuls	126 cm	235 kg
116 Konzept6	116 cm	210 kg
116 Accent	116 cm	210 kg
116 Clou	116 cm	210 kg
116 Impuls	116 cm	210 kg
132 Ritmo	132 cm	270 kg
126 Ritmo	126 cm	235 kg
122 C Ritmo	125 cm	225 kg
122 Ritmo	125 cm	225 kg
116 Ritmo	116 cm	210 kg

== Brands ==
In addition to the Seiler brand, Seiler manufactures two other brands: Eduard Seiler for the mid-level market and Johannes Seiler for the entry-level market.

=== Eduard Seiler ===
Made for the mid-level piano market, Eduard Seiler pianos are designed by Seiler and built by Samick factory in West Java, Indonesia.

=== Johannes Seiler ===
Made for the entry-level piano market, Johannes Seiler pianos are designed by Seiler and built by Samick factory in West Java, Indonesia.
