= Yuriy Oliynyk =

Ukrainian composer and pianist (1931–2021)

- Юрій Олійник
- Born: December 1, 1931; Ternopil, Ukrainian SSR, Soviet Union
- Died: September 13, 2021 (aged 89); Sacramento, California, U.S.
- Occupations: Composer, pianist, professor

Yuriy Oleksiiovych Oliynyk (Note: Ukrainian: Юрій Олексійович Олійник, romanized: Yurii Oleksiiovych Oliinyk) (December 1, 1931 – September 13, 2021) was a composer, concert pianist, and professor of music who lived and worked in the United States.

== Biography ==
Yuriy Oliynyk was born in Ternopil, Ukraine. He was the son of a Ukrainian lawyer and started studying piano at the age of seven. During World War II, his family was forced to flee from their home to Austria, and later Germany.

In 1950, Oliynyk emigrated to the United States. He received a degree in piano as a Bachelor of Music from the Cleveland Institute of Music and a degree in musicology as a Master of Arts from the Case Western Reserve University.

Oliynyk was a trained music teacher; as of 2022 he worked at the American River College in Sacramento, California. He was the first president of the Ukrainian Heritage Club of Northern California.

== Works ==
Oliynyk has composed four concertos for bandura and orchestra, a piano concerto and other pieces for piano, bandura, and voice. Together with his wife Ola Herasymenko, he has performed his works, along with other works of famous classical composers, across the US and Europe. His music has been performed by other musicians and has been recorded onto CDs.

In October 2000 a World Premiere of Oliynyk's piano concerto took place in Europe, with Oksana Rapita as soloist.
