= Shun Ng =

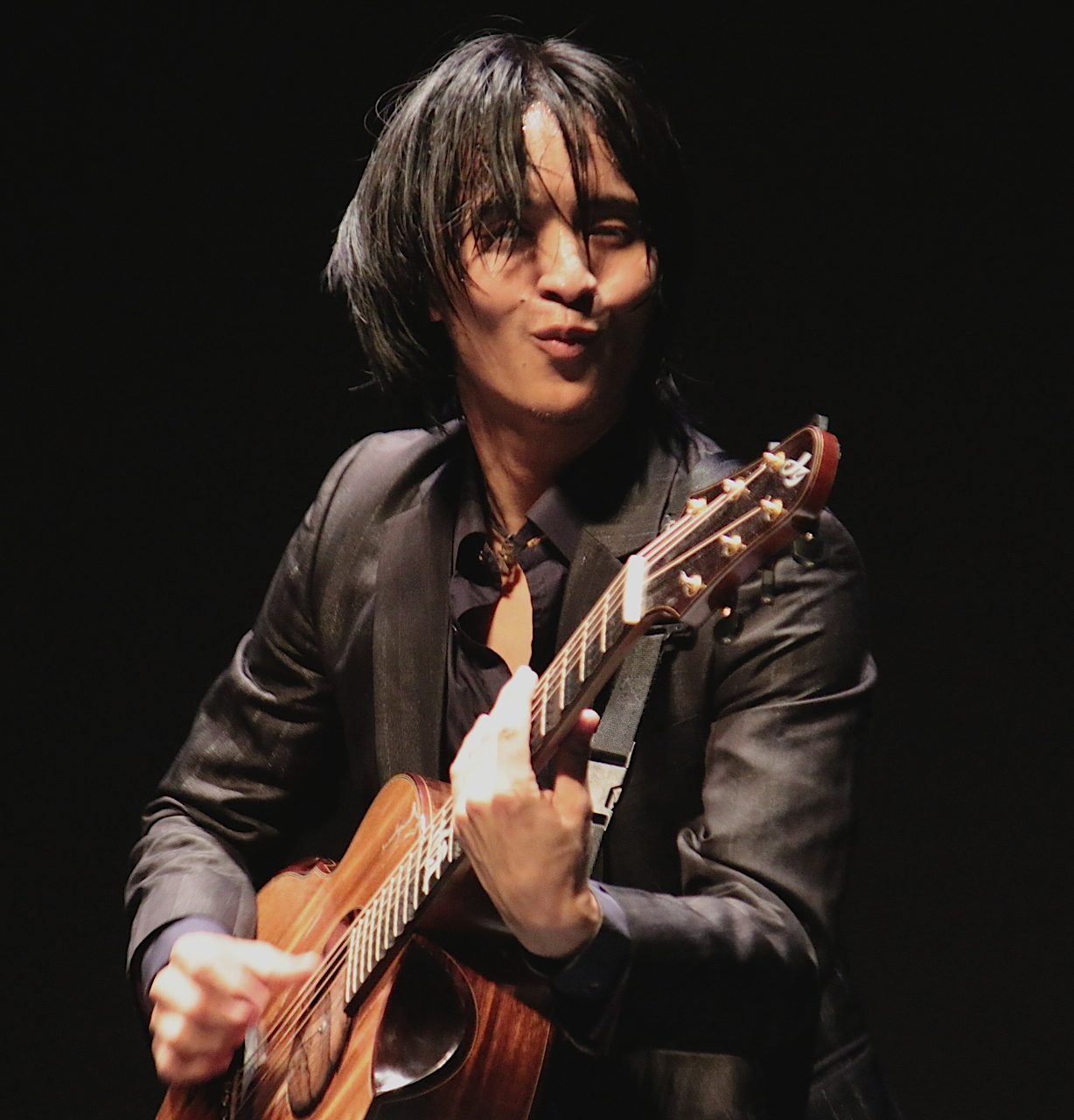
- Shun Live in Singapore

Background information
- Born: Shunyi Ng; May 24, 1990 (age 36); Chicago, Illinois, United States
- Genres: Soul; funk; blues; R&B
- Occupations: Musician; singer; songwriter
- Instruments: Guitar; vocals
- Years active: 2011–present
- Label: Black Wolf Records
- Website: shunng.com

Shun Ng (born May 24, 1990) is an American fingerstyle guitarist, singer and songwriter known for his flamboyant guitar style and energetic performances. He is a Boston Music Award winner and recipient of the Songwriters Hall of Fame 'Holly Prize'.

== Early life and education ==
Shun Ng was born in Chicago, Illinois while his father was studying at Northwestern University, after which his family moved back to Singapore. Ng began competitive gymnastics at an early age; when a teammate brought a guitar into the gym, Ng shifted his interest to music.

Ng was diagnosed with dyslexia at the age of eight, and, in spite of earnest efforts, struggled through most of his education.

Ng was mentored by Singaporean Composer & Cultural Medallion winner, Dr. Kelly Tang.

Ng attended Singapore Polytechnic and attained an associate degree in Music & Audio Technology in 2010.

Ng served his two-year National Service in the Singapore Armed Forces Music and Drama Company. He performed in the band and subsequently served as an arranger.

In 2012, Ng was accepted into Berklee College of Music on a scholarship and in 2013 earned entry into the highly-selective Artist Diploma program. Ng completed one semester on the Artist Diploma program before leaving Berklee College of Music.

== Career ==
In 2010, Ng was invited by Singaporean composer Iskandar Ismail to perform at the closing ceremony of the inaugural Youth Olympic Games in Singapore.

In 2012, Ng independently released his debut album, Funky Thumb Stuff. Ng was invited to perform for the president of Singapore for the national broadcast, President's Star Charity which raised $6.23 million that year. He also performed as part of Jeremy Monteiro's "Jazzy Christmas! Duets" concert at the Esplanade Concert Hall in Singapore.

Ng performed his first show in America at Boston Beyond Borders and shared the bill with singer-songwriter, Livingston Taylor and other established Boston acts.

In January 2013, Ng signed with Ralph Jaccodine Management.

In May 2013, Ng released a new video, "Get On With It". The video came to the attention of producer Quincy Jones, who then invited Shun to his home for a meeting, receiving high praise from the producer. In talking about Ng, he said, "When you see Shun Ng, you won't believe your eyes nor your ears - he belies all stereotypes, all premonitions. I was simply blown away by both his soul and his science - his creativity and his uniqueness is astounding."

Ng was nominated for a Boston Music Award and performed at the 2013 awards show. That same year, he was also cited by The Improper Bostonian Magazine as one of the "Top Ten Local acts that rock".

In 2014, Quincy Jones presented Ng at the "Quincy Jones Presents: Shun Ng" showcase at the Eli Broad Stage in Santa Monica.

In December 2014, Ng released a solo acoustic version of Queen's "Bohemian Rhapsody". Shortly after, the video was tweeted by Queen's lead guitarist, Brian May.

In 2015, Ng signed with Supreme Entertainment Artists.

Ng is a 5-time Boston Music Award nominee and in 2015, won the 'International Artist of The Year' at the Boston Music Awards.

In 2016, Ng was awarded the 'Holly Prize' by the Songwriters Hall of Fame.

=== Magic Dick & Shun Ng ===
In 2014, Ng began collaborating and touring with The J. Geils Band co-founder and harmonica player Magic Dick. They formed an acoustic duo and released a single of James Brown's "Papa's Got a Brand New Bag".

The duo began touring in 2015 and has toured on the Legendary Rhythm & Blues Cruise with acts including Buddy Guy, Irma Thomas and Allen Toussaint. As well as the Beale Street Music Festival at Memphis in May which included other acts like Paul Simon, Neil Young, Jason Derulo, Beck and Meghan Trainor.

In September 2016, the duo released their debut album, titled "About Time". The album received a 5-Star rating on Roots Music Report, and has received positive reviews from other Blues and Roots media outlets.

=== Shun Ng & the Shunettes ===
In 2015, Ng co-founded "the Shunettes" with arranger and singer, Deon Mose. Later that year, Mose brought on soprano, Angel Chisholm, daughter of Jackie Clark from the Grammy award-winning vocal group, The Clark Sisters.

Shun Ng & the Shunettes performed their debut at the 2016 Boston Music Awards.

In 2017, Shun Ng & the Shunettes performed at the KK Jazz Festival featuring guest Shunette, The Voice of China finalist, Melody Tan.

In December 2017, Shun Ng & the Shunettes were featured on Channel News Asia as part of their 2017 Asian tour on the morning talk show, First Look Asia.

== Awards and nominations ==
Year	Event	Work	Award	Result
2013	Boston Music Awards	N/A	International Artist of The Year	Nominated
2014	Boston Music Awards	N/A	International Artist of The Year	Nominated
2015	Boston Music Awards	N/A	International Artist of The Year	Won
2016	Songwriters Hall of Fame	N/A	The Holly Prize	Won
2016	Boston Music Awards	N/A	International Artist of The Year	Nominated
2017	Detroit Audience Choice Awards	Magic Dick & Shun Ng	Best Duo	Won
2017	Boston Music Awards	N/A	International Artist of The Year	Nominated

== Guitars ==
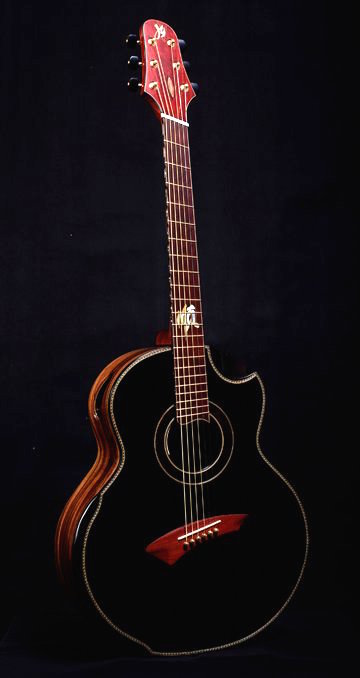
Jeffrey Yong - Shun Ng Signature Model - Blackie

Ng plays guitars made by Malaysian Luthier Jeffrey Yong from Albizia saman wood. His most frequently used guitar features a multi-scaled neck. The guitar was featured at the 2011 Montreal Guitar Show.
