= Lindert Guitars =

American guitar manufacturer

- Company type: Private
- Industry: Musical instruments
- Founded: 1986
- Founder: Charles Lindert
- Defunct: 2002; 24 years ago
- Headquarters: Chelan Falls, Washington, United States
- Products: Electric guitars

Lindert Guitars was an American guitar manufacturing company founded in 1986 in Chelan Falls, near Wenatchee, Washington. Guitars were handmade, with their production being moved to Korea and the company shut down shortly afterwards, with the last guitars created around 2002. Most of their guitars were named following a railway theme, with names including Conductor, Diesel and Locomotive.

== History ==
Charles Lindert started his electric guitar business with his friend and partner Larry Krupla, locating themselves in a semi-dilapidated Blue Chelan fruit processing warehouse that served as the first Lindert factory. In 1995, Lindert came up with the design of the "Locomotive" series, which they took to the music industry trade show in Frankfurt, Germany. As the guitar became a success, Lindert took orders for 110 instruments.

With not much knowledge about building guitars, Lindert got advice from Freddie Tavares, a steel guitar player and instrument designer with a long experience in the field (as, per example, he was the man playing the bending steel guitar whine in the opening of the Looney Tunes cartoon song or his work with Leo Fender in the design of the Stratocaster model).

Tavares explained to Lindert about the importance of making an instrument with such grade of originality that allowed it to be identifiable with the Lindert's name. As Lindert himself described: ...finally, I just had my hand resting on the paper, with my thumb kind of sticking up, and I looked down and I saw it, and I said "That’s it!", it was the beginning for the characteristic "thumbs up" symbol that identified the brand.

Another of Lindert's designs, the Levitator guitar, would be used by artists such as Willie Nelson, Carl Wilson of The Beach Boys, Johnny Cash, and Chet Atkins. A prototype of the Levitator was exhibited at the NAMM Show in Anaheim. Orders for guitars increased, with a peak of 150 inquiries a week. By 1997, Lindert had 65 distributors around the country. The guitar necks and hardware were made in Korea and other components were in the old Blue Chelan warehouse.

== Characteristics ==
These unusual guitars were handmade and featured semi-hollow, machined pine or poplar bodies with cloth or tweed insets that resembled those found on vintage radios. They are also known for the "escape velocity" neck profile - ergonomically designed to be half rounded and half vee for faster playing action and less hand fatigue, which is regarded as one of their strongest features. All Lindert guitars also featured a headstock which resembles a hand giving a "thumbs up", a design patented by Charles Lindert himself. The maker was supposedly so pleased with the design of his guitar body that he gave himself a mental thumbs-up, and then decided to fashion the headstock to resemble one. Some models included the "Missing Link" switch, which allowed several pickup combinations not available on other guitars, including neck/bridge and using all three pickups at once.

Lindert guitars are noted by collectors for their non-traditional designs, specific technical features, and limited production.

The guitars made in Korea can be distinguished from the US-made versions in several ways:

- a smooth finish
- smaller headstock with a decal that runs parallel to the strings
- no screws beneath the bridge on the front of the body
- a truss rod adjustment at the headstock
- a neckplate with a serial number stamped on it, usually starting with a "9"

== Models ==
Guitar models manufactured by Lindert included:

- Conductor
- Diesel S
- Franklin HH
- John Henry
- Levitator
- Locomotive S
- Locomotive S Baritone
- Locomotive T HH
- Locomotive T Series
- Skyliner
- Twister
