= Bohemian Guitars =

Instrument manufacturer

Bohemian Guitars, LLC
- Type: Private
- Industry: Musical instruments
- Founded: 2012; 14 years ago
- Founders: Adam Lee and Shaun Lee
- Headquarters: Atlanta, Georgia, USA
- Area served: Worldwide
- Products: Electric guitars, ukuleles

Bohemian Guitars is a defunct Atlanta-based guitar manufacturer that made custom electric guitars, basses, and ukuleles using unconventional materials (such as vintage oil cans and lunch boxes).

The company was founded by brothers Adam and Shaun Lee, who grew up in Johannesburg, South Africa and were inspired by local township residents who re-purposed used materials into playable instruments.

== History ==
While brothers Adam and Shaun Lee were visiting their hometown of Johannesburg, South Africa, Shaun saw many of the street musicians using unconventional materials to create music. While he was impressed with the musician's ingenuity and resourcefulness, he especially appreciated the sound quality of the oil-can guitar. When he arrived back in the U.S., he started building his own oil can and lunchbox guitars out of completely recycled materials in his parents’ basement in Marietta, Georgia.

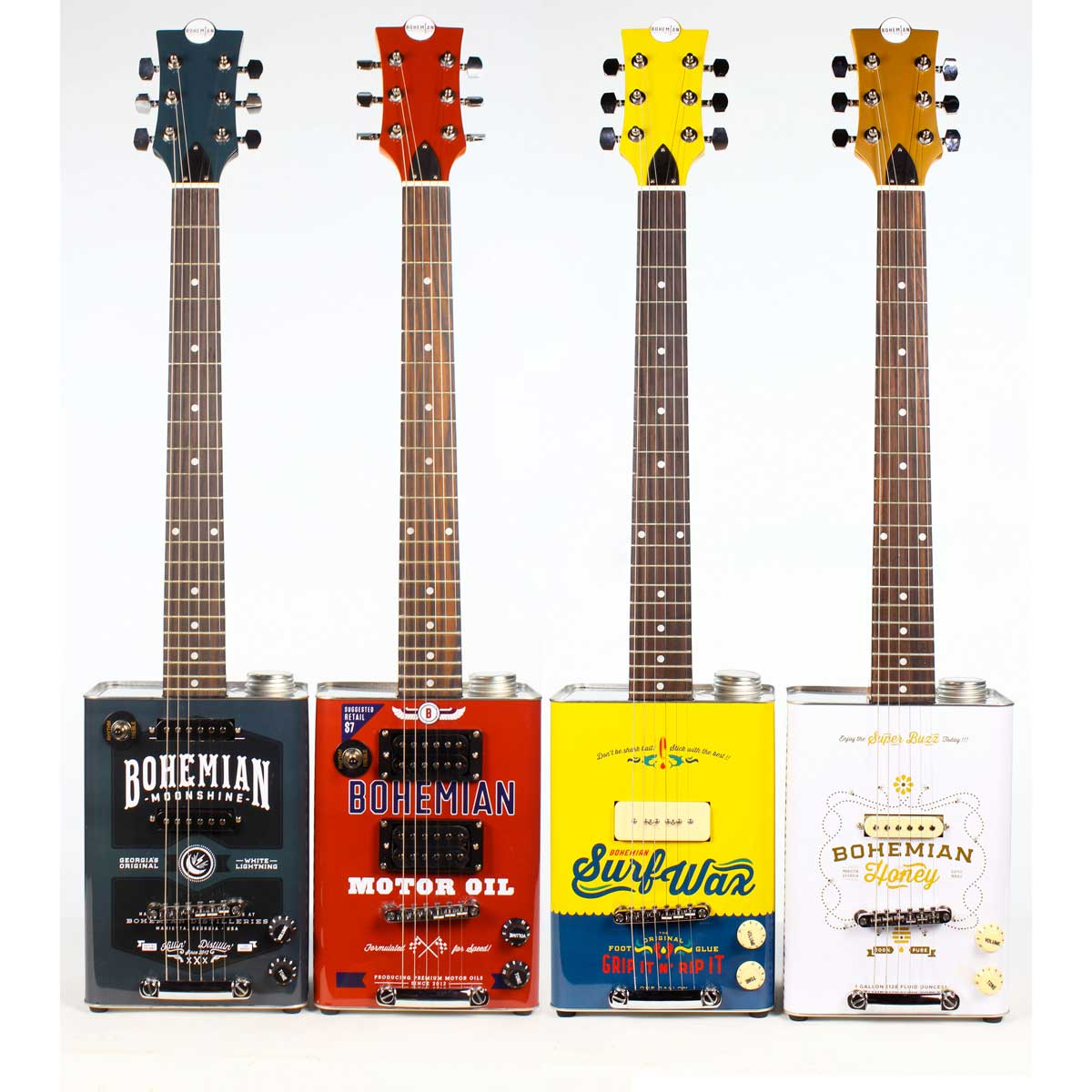
Boho Series Guitars

After initially selling guitars to friends and community members, the brothers realized they had a budding business on their hands. The company was founded in 2012 by Adam Lee (Chief Executive Office), Shaun Lee (Chief Manufacturing Officer) and Mark Friedman (Chief Bohemian Officer).

To determine the brand's chance of success, Bohemian Guitars launched a January 2013 Kickstarter campaign to raise funds to create the Boho Series, a mass-produced self-branded guitar (still made from recycled materials). The campaign raised $55,000—$20,000 over their goal of $32,000 to meet production costs. As of September 2018, some customers from that campaign still have not received their instruments, and the company does not reply to repeated requests, even though instruments are for sale on the website, nor have they delivered refunds. The company is currently rated F by the Better Business Bureau due to these complaints.

Following its Kickstarter campaign, the company raised funds through SparkMarket, an Atlanta-based intrastate equity crowdfunding platform. Using the Investment Georgia Exemption (IGE) legislation, which allows businesses registered and headquartered in the state to raise up to $1M per year from state residents, both accredited and non-accredited investors, Bohemian Guitars was the first to raise money this way in an open (publicly marketed) capital raise since 1933. In addition to Kickstarter and SparkMarket, the company has also turned to Fundable to raise additional funding.

In August 2015, Bohemian Guitars launched a crowdfunding campaign on Indiegogo to launch the Boho Series 2.0 in which the company raised $325,283 from 2019 backers.

== Guitars ==
=== Boho Series ===
Vintage Series Guitars

The Boho Series is a Bohemian Guitars branded line of 6-string oil can guitars with maple necks and rosewood fingerboards. They currently produce seven designs: Bohemian Ale, Moonshine, Honey, Hot Sauce, Motor Oil, TNT and Surf Wax. Each design has a different pickup configuration, ranging from a double humbucker to a soap bar pickup. The box shape of the oil cans lets the guitars stand on their own without a guitar stand.

=== Vintage Series ===
The Vintage Series guitars are all one-of-a-kind, upcycled instruments. Built from antique oil cans and tin lunchboxes, every guitar piece is made from recycled components. The neck, hardware, and other assorted parts are saved from used instruments.

=== Artist relations ===
The artist G. Love of G. Love & Special Sauce, the Kongos, Guster, Hozier, and David Cook also use Bohemian Guitars.
