= Hondo (guitar company) =

American guitar company and brand

Hondo was an American guitar company and brand owned by IMC, and later Musicorp, that produced a range of entry level to high-end acoustic guitars, electric guitars and basses with designs primarily based on those of classic models such as the Fender Stratocaster and the Gibson Les Paul. From 1972 to 1989 the guitars were mainly produced in Korea by Samick, with the short-lived Professional Series being made in Japan. In 2005, the J.B. Player brand replaced the Hondo name.

== History ==
The Hondo guitar company was originally formed in 1969 when Jerry Freed and Tommy Moore of the International Music Corporation (IMC) of Fort Worth, Texas, formed a joint-venture with Korean manufacturer Samick Company. IMC's intent was to introduce modern manufacturing techniques and American/Japanese quality standards to the Korean guitar manufacturing industry. The Hondo concept was to offer an organized product line and solid entry-level market instruments at a fair market price.

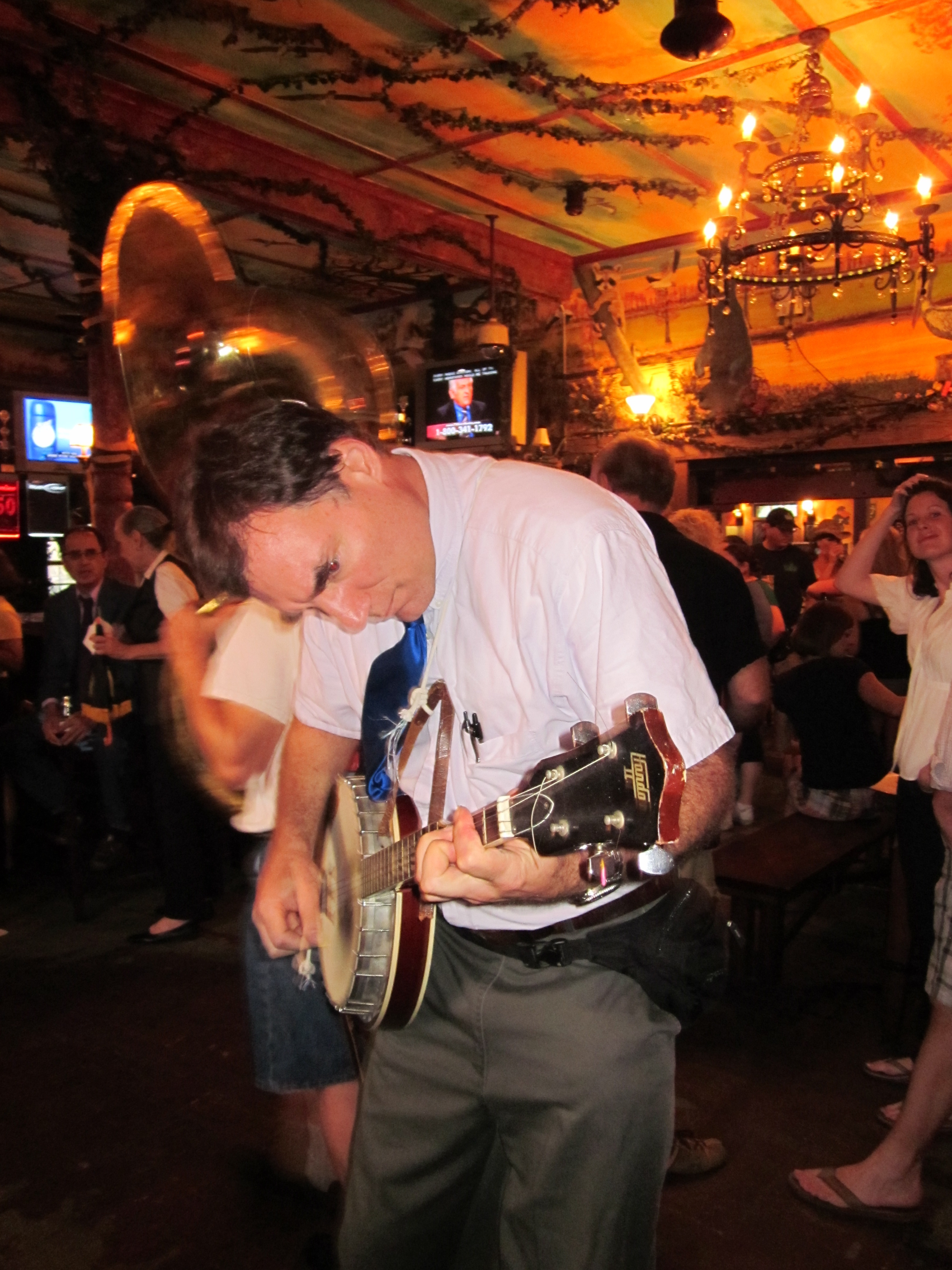
Hondo II banjo played by jazz band

By 1975, Hondo had distributors in 70 countries worldwide, and had expanded to producing stringed instruments at the time. In 1976, over 22,000 of the Bi-Centennial banjos were sold. The company also made improvements to the finish quality on their products, introduced scalloped bracing on acoustics, and began using a higher quality brand of tuning machines.

Hondo was one of the first overseas guitar builders to feature American-built DiMarzio pickups on the import instruments beginning in 1978. By this year, a number of Hondo II models featured designs based on classic American favorites. In 1979, over 790,000 Hondo instruments were sold worldwide. In 1980, the Professional Series was introduced, featuring higher-end Japanese-made models, produced by Tokai and Matsumoku (Only the Professional Series models were made in Japan, all other Hondos were made in Korea). These models were sold until 1983, alongside the Korean lineup (which became the Deluxe Series in 1981). At that point, the product line consisted of 485 different models.

In 1985, IMC acquired major interest in the Charvel/Jackson Company, and began dedicating more time and interest in the higher end guitar market. The Hondo trademark went into mothballs around 1989. However, Jerry Freed started the Jerry Freed International Company in 1989, and acquired the rights to the Hondo trademark in 1991. Freed began distribution of a new line of Hondo guitars produced in India, China and Taiwan. In 1993, the revamped company was relocated to Stuart, Florida.

The Hondo Guitar Company was purchased by the MBT International (now Musicorp) in 1995. The Hondo product line was revamped for improved quality while maintaining student-friendly prices. Hondo celebrated their 25th year of manufacturing electric guitars in 1997. Musicorp also owns and distributes J.B. Player instruments which replaced Hondo in 2005.

== See also ==
- List of guitar manufacturers
- Samick
- Matsumoku
