= Vasyl Ovchynnikov =

Ukrainian bandurist (1868–1934)

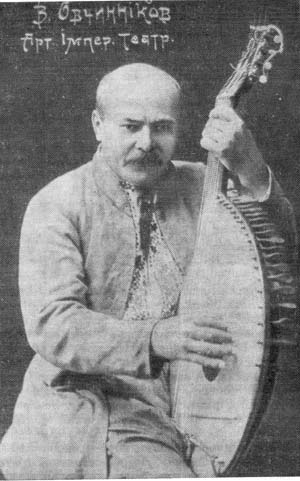
Vasyl Ovchynnikov

Vasyl' Pavlovych Ovchynnikov or Ovchinnikiv (1868–1934) was a Ukrainian bandurist and performing artist in the Moscow Theatre (Bolshoi?). A renowned singer he was a popularizer of the bandura at the turn of the century. He is also remembered as the author of one of the first bandura handbooks.

== Biography ==
Ovchinnikiv wrote about himself in 1928 ..." the idea of learning to play the bandura came to me whilst performing in Kropivnytsky's troupe (in 1885) who also played on the bandura a little bit.... I bought in Kharkiv a bandura and decided to learn to play the instrument. Not knowing how to start, I turned to the blind street bandurists. After many setbacks I lost interest. I returned to perform in the Russian opera initially in Kharkiv and then Moscow."

In 1905, it became easier to propagate Ukrainian interests in Moscow and a Ukrainian musical group was formed initially at the "Hromada" and later at "Kobzar". which organized interesting concerts and exhibitions, especially on Taras Shevchenko's birthday.

"One time the student A. Voloshchenko invited his friend M. Kravchenko to Moscow from Poltava. It came to my mind and a few others to organize a bandura group in Moscow. The Musical firm Kalmus and Co. in Moscow made a number of instruments. We took as an example the bandura that Voloshchenko had. He had a copy of Kravchenko's bandura who he had learned to play bandura from and who played well...

"I received the first Moscow made bandura and the next day I was at Voloshchenko's house who agreed to teach me. I was 43 years old. The next day I understood that I would be able to play and in three months I was playing simple songs.

The head of the "Kobzar" Society suggested that I put together a short handbook for the bandura. I refused because I did not know where to start from. Then F. Korsh from the academy suggested I put together not a school of bandura but a handbook which would demonstrate the system I used to learn to play the bandura. This I did. I introduced the bandura to the reader and then wrote up the initial exercises which I learned from Voloshchenko. In the 4th section I included a number of simple songs, and on my own cost, in 1913 published in Moscow 1000 copies of "A self teaching manual for the bandura (kobza)".

Ovchinnikiv wrote: "I played everywhere wherever I was invited to perform There was not a concert that took place in Moscow for the benefit of the poor students that I did not perform at with my bandura. When the war broke out and a large number of sick soldiers began to turn up, the bandura left a good feeling for these victims. I had 248 such concerts. At that time I was proud that I had learned to play the bandura."

In 1916, Ovchynnikov was sent into exile to the city of Vitluga in the Viatsk gubernia for his Ukrainophilic/nationalistic tendencies, and only moved back to Kharkiv after the revolution in 1918.

Ovchinnikov was arrested again in 1934. His whereabouts after this arrest are unknown. He was most likely executed by the Stalin regime.

== Sources ==
- Mishalow, V. and M. - Ukrains'ki kobzari-bandurysty - Sydney, Australia, 1986
