= Hartley Peavey =

American music and audio equipment innovator (born 1941)

- Born: December 30, 1941 (age 84); Meridian, Mississippi, U.S.
- Education: Mississippi State University
- Occupation: CEO of Peavey Electronics Corporation
- Years active: 1965–present
- Known for: Founder of Peavey Electronics

Hartley Peavey (born December 30, 1941) is an American entrepreneur and the founder and CEO of Peavey Electronics Corporation, a musical equipment innovation and production company. A 1964 graduate of Mississippi State University, Peavey has been recognized by his alma mater as an Alumni Fellow and as the 2004 commencement speaker. He also received an honorary doctor of creative and performing arts degree from Mississippi State in 2004.

Hartley Peavey founded Peavey Electronics, one of the world's largest manufacturers and suppliers of musical and professional audio equipment, in 1964 after building his first amplifier in 1956. Since its founding, Peavey Electronics has been privately owned and has grown massively from their humble beginnings in Hartley's basement in the 1950s.

== Career ==
Growing up, Peavey dreamt of becoming a rock star. His father discouraged him from pursuing such a career because he thought rock 'n' roll would never last. Peavey wanted to participate so badly that he built a working amplifier from surplus parts, but he was not a particularly good musician. His first band would play for fraternity parties for $50. He would build an amp or a PA system whenever his band needed them. Unfortunately, he was kicked out of the band afterwards.

Peavey reached a turning point when he realized that he was a poor musician, but still loved music, so he decided to build musical equipment. In 1965, after graduating from Mississippi State, he started his company with the idea of building the best product he could at a fair and reasonable price. He began while at his father's store in a small room, with his first products being single-unit bass and guitar amps.

Peavey eventually hired a part-time employee to help him, and his father realized that his son was serious enough to warrant the cosigning of his first loan of $17,000 to build his first factory. In the 70s, the company was highly successful, and Peavey decided to start making guitars and loudspeakers. Peavey Electronics has grown to be a global company with the effort Peavey put in the business over time, and from the lessons he learnt from mistakes made by his competitors.

== Awards and honors ==
- 2003: Honored by the City of Meridian, Mississippi, with "Hartley Peavey Drive"
- 2001: Inducted into the Mississippi Musicians Hall of Fame
- 1996: Profiled by CNN and featured in international print ad campaign in Forbes, The Economist, BusinessWeek and Money
- 1991: Honored by the President of the United States, George H. W. Bush, for workplace training, education and achievements in the international marketplace
- 1990: Inducted into Rock Walk of Fame, Hollywood, California

== Notes ==
- Achard, Ken (2005). The Peavey revolution : Hartley Peavey : the gear, the company, and the all-American success story. San Francisco: Backbeat Books; Berkeley, CA: Distributed to the book trade in the US and Canada by Publishers Group West; Milwaukee, WI: Distributed to the music trade in the US and Canada by Hal Leonard Publishing Co, © 2005. ISBN 0-87930-849-4.
