= Riversong Guitars =

Canadian guitar manufacturer

- Status: Active
- Genre: Music industry
- Location: Sicamous, British Columbia Kamloops, British Columbia
- Country: Canada

Riversong Guitars is a Canadian guitar manufacturer based in Sicamous, British Columbia.

== History ==
Riversong Guitars was established as a division of Lee’s Music, a family-run music store founded by Lee Miltimore in Kamloops, British Columbia. Drawing on his background in music retail, audio engineering, and instrument building, Mike Miltimore launched Riversong with the aim of rethinking acoustic guitar construction.

The company initially operated out of Kamloops before expanding production into a larger facility in Sicamous, British Columbia, a building that formerly housed a houseboat manufacturing operation, with Miltimore stating the location allowed for expanded production and the use of local Canadian tonewoods, including maple, spruce, and walnut from the surrounding Shuswap region.

== Products ==
Riversong produces a range of acoustic and acoustic-electric guitars, including:

- Tradition Series – Riversong’s early line of acoustic guitars combining traditional aesthetics with their unique construction features.
- Trad SE2 – A new model featuring solid Canadian woods, bevels, and their skeletized bracing.
- Pacific Series – Their most affordable models designed for live performance and touring musicians.
- G2 Series – Higher-end guitars based on designs from their custom shop.

The company also offers one-off custom guitars, ukuleles and custom electric guitars all including their adjustable neck system.

== Recognition ==
Riversong has received recognition from the music industry including:

- Nominations for Acoustic Guitar of the Year and Product of the Year at the MMR Dealers’ Choice Awards, with Riversong’s P2P-GA winning the award in 2022.
- Design awards & local entrepreneurship awards
- New distribution deals bringing the company to markets outside of Canada - including a U.S. Distribution partnership with Peavey Electronics in 2023 which the two companies announced at the 2023 NAMM Show in Anaheim, California.
- Endorsements from touring musicians and educators who emphasize the instruments’ playability and stability in variable climates.

== Manufacturing ==
The company depicts a focus on sustainable manufacturing practices, using locally sourced woods and environmentally conscious finishes. In late 2023, the company expanded production to a larger facility located in Sicamous, British Columbia.

== See also ==
- List of guitar manufacturers
- List of companies of Canada
