= Jon Kammerer Guitars =

American guitar manufacturer

Jon Kammerer Guitars is an American manufacturer of acoustic and electric guitars and basses, founded in 1999 by Jon Kammerer. The first Jon Kammerer guitars were acoustic, featuring an innovative, patented parabolic design that increases structural strength and durability, yet maintains tonal projection while reducing the size/weight of traditional acoustic guitars. Electric models followed, including full-sized and downsized solid-bodies, chambered (w/ f-hole), semi-hollow-body, and hollow-body models using similar rounded design cues based on parabolic arcs.

Chad Gilpin joined the Jon Kammerer Guitars team after designing and patenting an acoustic guitar soundhole that eliminates feedback when the guitar is amplified.

== Reviews/Testimonials ==
- Harmony Central Forum discussion
- Musician's Hotline Review of Jon Kammerer Solidbody Electric
