= Guitar manufacturing =

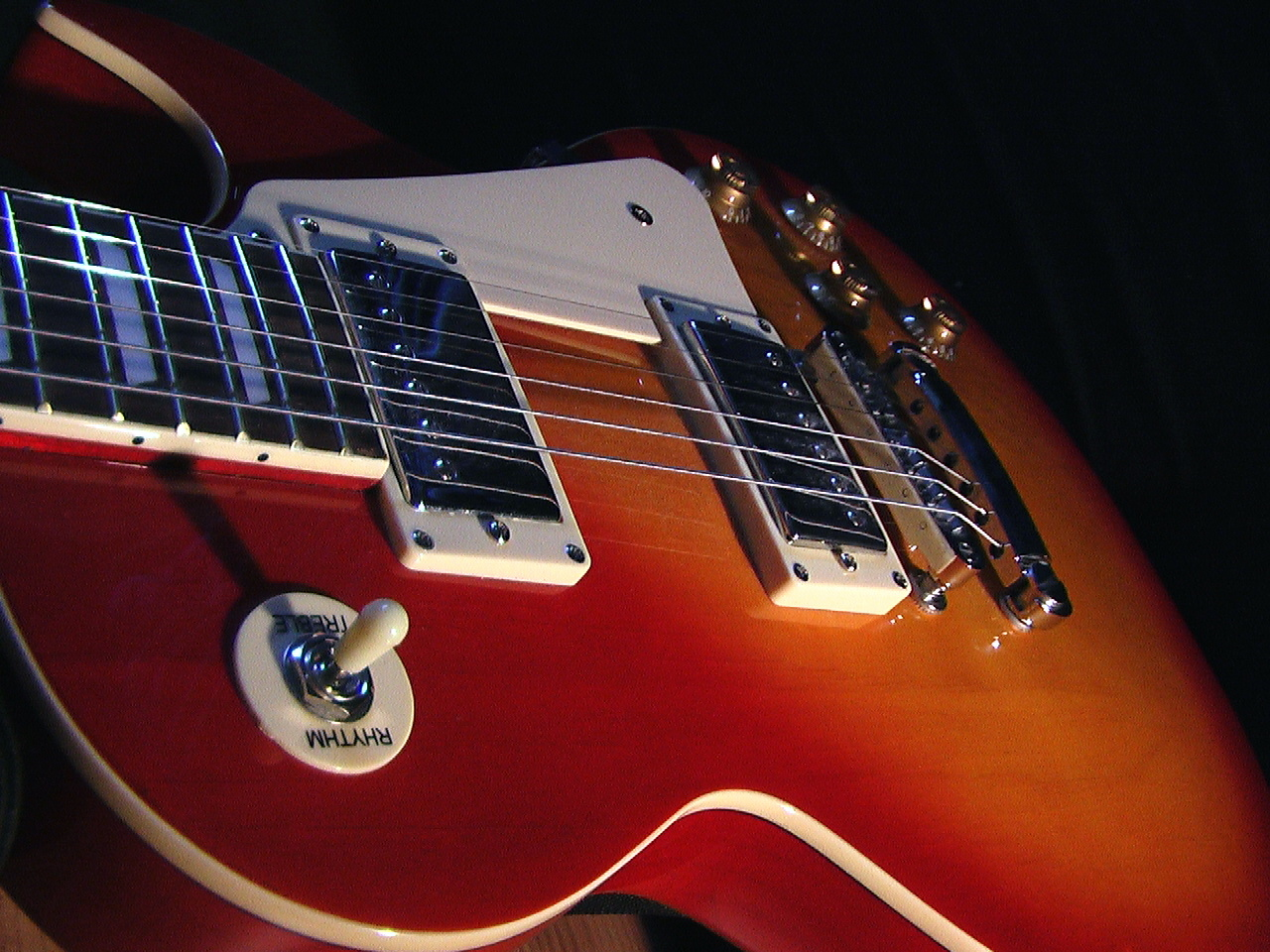

Guitar manufacturing is the use of machines, tools, and labor in the production of electric and acoustic guitars. This phrase may be in reference to handcrafting guitars using traditional methods or assembly line production in large quantities using modern methods. Guitar manufacturing can also be broken into several categories such as body manufacturing and neck manufacturing, among others. Guitar manufacturing includes the production of alto, classical, tenor, and bass tuned guitars (with classical being the most widely used tuning).

A luthier is a person who has learned the craft of making string instruments including guitars, generally on a very small scale.

== History ==
=== Form and materials ===
The guitar has been played for hundreds of years, since evolving from the Lute and the Vihuela. The earliest guitars were made almost entirely out of wood, with some using animal intestines for strings and frets. Materials have become easier to obtain over the past 200 years. As a result, guitars are currently made out of materials that better suit their intended use. Frets and strings, for example, are now almost exclusively made out of metal, which is much longer lasting and more ideal than organic material.

=== Tools and process ===
The earliest guitars were not designed for mass production. Each guitar produced was a unique instrument artfully crafted by its luthier. This practice was common until the turn of the 18th century when the powers of the world experienced the Industrial Revolution.

While early mass production of guitars dramatically increased the number of guitars in circulation, each instrument was still handcrafted by a single or team of luthiers. For luthiers who still choose to handcraft their instruments, methods have changed very little over the past 500 years. As more advanced tooling options become available, however, less of the work in manufacturing a guitar is necessary to complete by hand. Handcrafting guitars is a time and labor-intensive method of production. Some common tools used by luthiers today are a band saw, drill press, table saw, stationary sander, jointer, C clamps, sanding board, column sander, power planer, dovetail saw, scraper blades, hand files, router, and sandpaper.

== Current guitar manufacturing ==
=== Materials ===
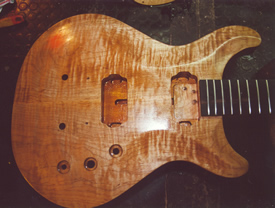
A guitar body, crafted from wood

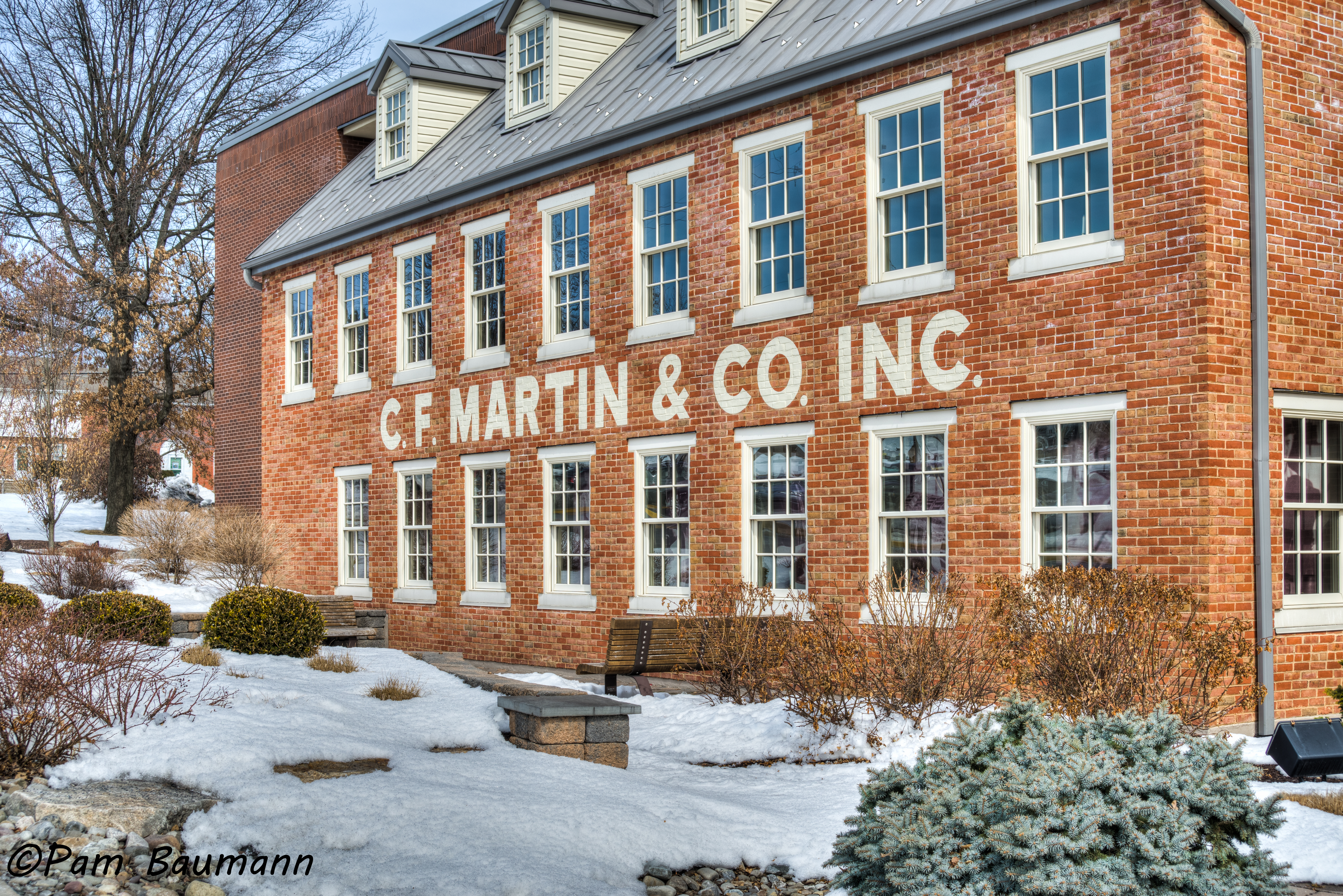
C.F. Martin & Company, manufacturer of Martin guitars in Nazareth, Pennsylvania

The majority of material comprising a modern guitar is wood. Typical woods used for the body and neck of a guitar today are mahogany, ash, maple, basswood, agathis, alder, poplar, walnut, spruce, and holly. Woods from around the world are also incorporated into modern acoustic and electric guitars. Some of these exotic tonewoods include koa, rosewood, bubinga, korina, lacewood, zebrawood, padouk, redwood, and wenge. With modern manufacturing techniques, almost any wood can be used if it can be obtained in an acceptable quantity. Abundance is not the only characteristic taken into consideration during the selection of a type of wood; woods have unique acoustic properties and produce different sounds and resonances at different frequencies and points. Woodgrain, pattern and defects (understand defects as genetic defects of the tree-like quilt, flame...) also are factors that contribute to the beautify of the instrument. This happens especially on guitar tops or veneers.

Other parts of the modern guitar such as tuners, frets, the bridge, and pickups are made out of metals and plastics. These materials offer increased performance and strength over wood or other organic material and are easy to obtain and machine.

With modern machining methods, luthiers and companies are no longer confined to working with woods. In addition, as tonal woods that offer the best sound quality become increasingly hard to come by, manufacturers are exploring different materials for the neck and body of guitars.

Aluminum is a functional alternative for crafting guitar bodies. Its combination of high strength and low weight are attractive to guitarists around the world. Aircraft-grade aluminum (6061) is the composition of choice for guitar manufactures such as Normandy Guitars and Xtreme Guitars. It is highly machinable, weldable, and strong enough to withstand the tension created by the strings while maintaining a relatively low weight. Some companies have experimented with aluminum necks, although aluminum's high degree of thermal expansion can cause the instrument to go out of tune after a short time.

Another popular alternative material for the body and neck of a guitar is carbon fibre. Advances in technology over the past century have allowed guitar manufacturers to use the excellent strength to weight ratio and cost-effectiveness of carbon fibre in their guitar designs. Manufacturers such as Rainsong have built their businesses around carbon fibre bodied guitars. Rainsong in particular uses carbon fibre in the tops, backs, sides, necks, headstocks, and fretboards of their guitars, offering intricate patterns of the fibre on select models.

=== Modern manufacturing process ===
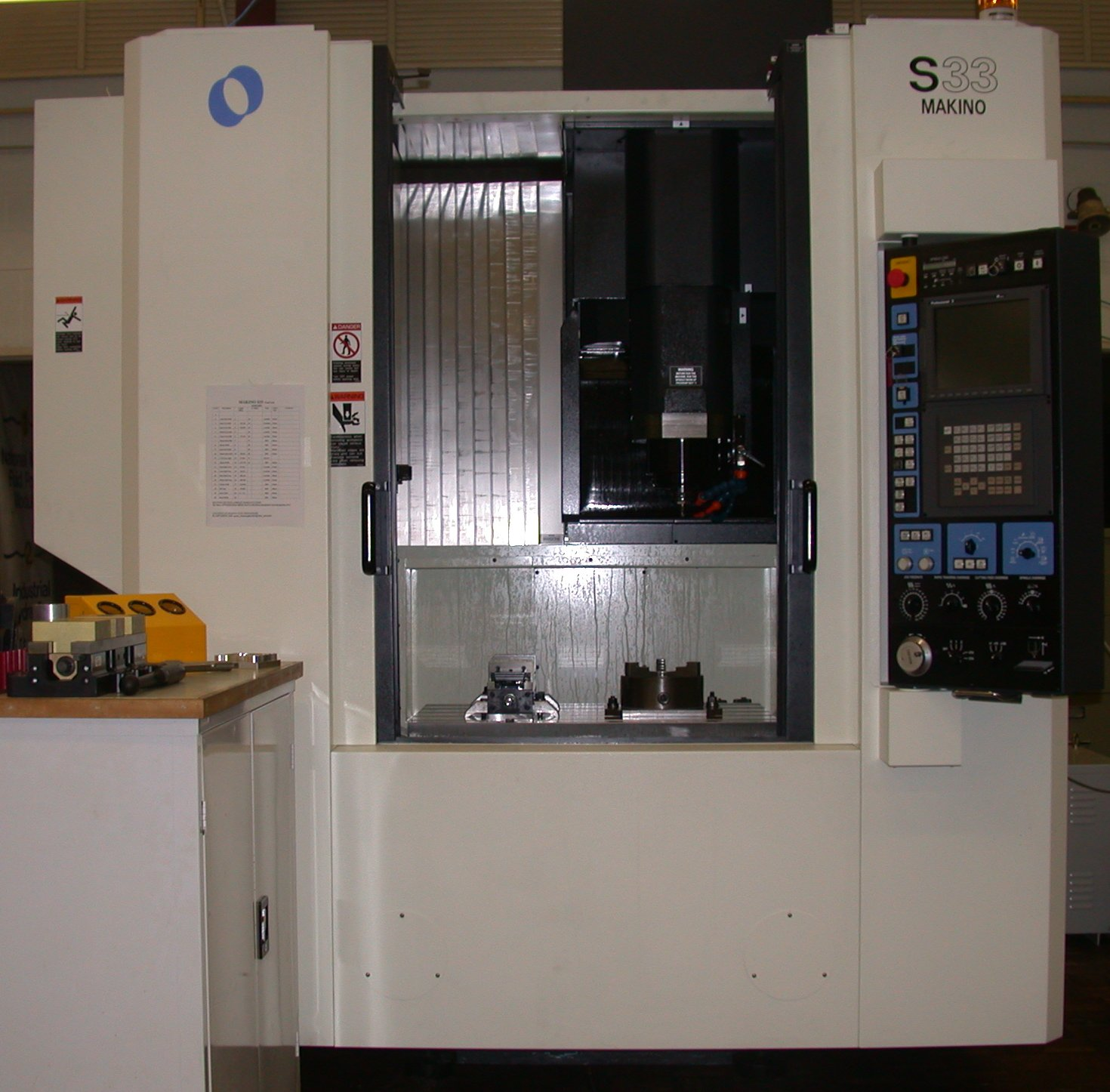
A CNC machining center, similar to those used by guitar manufacturers

While handcrafting guitars is still a popular method of guitar manufacturing for luthiers and large manufacturer custom shops, the major players in the guitar industry are shifting to computer-controlled mass production of guitars. This approach maintains the quality of their instruments while increasing efficiency and productivity.

Most manufacturers use some form of geometric modelling and CNC machining software when designing a guitar. A common choice of a CAD (Computer Aided Design) system is Solidworks, which is utilized by Taylor Guitars. With a CAD system, a two-dimensional or three-dimensional model of the guitar can be designed and seen before a physical model is created. This allows for consistency and convenience in the design process, whether the guitar is made out of wood, metal, polymer, or any machinable substance. For a guitar made out of aluminum, for example, the top, sides, and back of the body are drawn in a modelling program and a 3D model can be created by combining these 2D features. This representation gives the ability to see the final product before any material is cut.

A popular choice for a CAM (Computer Aided Manufacturing) software suite is MasterCAM. It is also used by Taylor Guitars. The CAM software takes the 3D model created in the CAD system and uses a Computer Numerical Control (CNC) machine, also known as a CNC router (typically a vertical machining center) to cut out the 2D pieces from, in the example above, a sheet of aluminum. This process can eliminate waste as well as decrease machining time and machine downtime. The pieces cut from the sheets of aluminum are assembled by a worker using a TIG (Tungsten Inert Gas) welder.

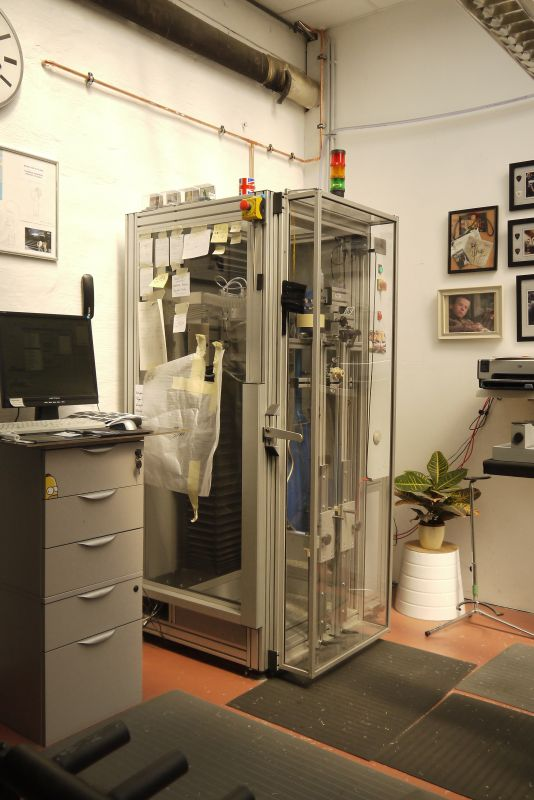
A Plek machine used for fret brushing at Duesenberg Guitar Factory

CAD and CAM systems are not limited to cutting guitar bodies alone. They are utilized by several manufacturers in cut necks, fretboards, and other parts of the guitar quickly and efficiently. The advantage of CNC machining is the accuracy and precision of the cutting. These machines can make thousands of parts with tolerances of mere ten-thousandths of an inch. C.F. Martin & Company uses CNC machines to cut the necks and neck pockets of their guitars. C.F. Martin uses the machines because of the precision and quality of cutting that CNC offers. The Plek machine is a CNC machine currently being implemented by a large number of guitar manufacturing companies. The machine is a time-saving way to level and shape fretboards through a process called fret dressing.

CNC machining does not do all of the work, however. It is merely a tool to reduce variance between guitars, allowing the craftsman to do their jobs more efficiently and quickly. Gibson Guitar Corporation has had 2 policies relating to the manufacturing of quality instruments throughout their 100 plus years of manufacturing: "Buy or invent machines for dangerous or repetitive operations requiring great accuracy and employ a highly skilled worker when the human touch or the musician’s ear is required."

== See also ==
- Relic'ing
