= Petros Guitars =

US musical instrument maker

Petros Guitars are an elite customized acoustic guitar luthier, consisting of Bruce Petros and his son Matt Petros. They are based in Kaukauna, Wisconsin. They are noted for their exceptionally high quality craftsmanship and often make guitars similar in appearance to Spanish Baroque guitars with the design, making both steel and nylon string hand-made guitars. Bruce began making guitars in 1972, and in 2000 he was joined by his son to form the Petros company.

The company makes six models, the New FS (fingerstyle), Parlor, GC, D, Jumbo, and a Baritone, each retailing at a flat price of $12,000 as of April 2013, making them amongst the most expensive new guitars in the world. The company also provides the option for customized furnishings such as exotic woods, buffalo horn nuts and saddles, mammoth ivory bridge pins and nuts, and specialized inlay and cutaway designs etc. for an additional fee. The customized Petros guitars made of rare woods such as African Blackwood, Ceylon Satinwood or old flitch matched Brazilian Rosewood are sold for an extra $4,000 which with other furnishings such as ivory bridge pins can fetch over $22,000 in total.
