= Joseph Lukes Guitars =

English stringed instrument manufacturing company

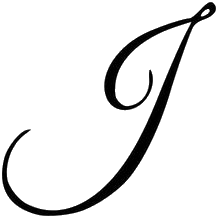
- Type: Private
- Industry: Musical instruments
- Founded: 2011; 15 years ago
- Founder: Luke Joseph Sharples
- Headquarters: London, U.K.
- Products: Acoustic guitars, ukuleles

Joseph Lukes Guitars was a stringed instrument manufacturing company based in London, England. They produced one steel-string acoustic guitar model known as the "Grand Concert" and a ukulele.

== History ==
"Joseph Lukes Guitars Ltd." was originally formed in 2011 as J.S. Lukes Ltd. by Luke Joseph Sharples. The company underwent a name change in 2012 to Joseph Lukes Guitars. The company was founded during Sharples’ undergraduate degree in Musical Instrument Technology at London Metropolitan University.

From 2011 to 2014, the company's limited company status has remained dormant with the company operating under self-employed status.

The workshop was located at Artistic Spaces located in South Bermondsey, London however, relocated to Shoreditch, London in late 2014. The company produces innovative handmade acoustic guitars created by the company's founder Luke Joseph Sharples. The production of each instrument is done using hand tools and traditional methods without the use of electric tools or machines. CNC, side bending machines nor electric saws or drills are used in the construction of the instruments. The company's instrument production is structured to allow their luthiers to create an instrument from beginning to completion without the use of a factory line structure.

The company appeared in Acoustic magazine in the March 2014 issue in the section In the Workshop. Later, in October 2014, Sharples provided the afterword in Acoustic Magazine's 'Book of British Guitar Making'.

The company attended South by South West in March 2014. In November 2014 the Joseph Lukes Guitars announced its participation as a lifestyle partner in La Maison Rémy Martin held at 19 Greek Street. In April 2015, Joseph Lukes Guitars was nominated for the Making Business Happen Awards 2015 held at University of South Wales. Shortly after, Joseph Lukes Guitars announced the release of its first guitar series, the FE Series featuring both an American Mahogany and East Indian Rosewood model in the Grand Concert size. Concurrently a string of appearances at guitar shows through 2015/2016 was also announced.

As of 2023, Joseph Lukes Guitars is no longer in business with the company having dissolved.

== Ethos ==
Joseph Lukes was a supporter of trades and manufacturing products locally. The company's slogan is: “Traditional Methods. Innovative Design.”

== Product Manufacturing Process ==
Joseph Lukes Guitars constructed high-end, handcrafted guitars and ukuleles using hand tools. Uses of wood working technologies such as CNC, laser cutting and UV lacquer curing, are not used on any of the instruments.

Each component, including inlay design, was done by hand. Due to their traditional construction methods Joseph Lukes does not have a mass market version of any of their instrument designs. The company produced, on average, twelve guitars per year. Each instrument takes at least 300 hours of labor. Construction of each guitar is strictly hand done thus limiting the company's output. Joseph Lukes Guitars produces instruments in the UK without the use of offshore production or manufacture.

== Series ==
Joseph Lukes Guitars product range comprised the following instruments:

- Grand Concert Acoustic Guitar (Available in FE Series)
- Ukulele (Available 2015)
- Grand Acoustic Bass Guitar (Available 2016)

=== FE Series ===
The FE Series featured hybrid bracing™ and a sound port. The sound-hole is removed from the top, keeping the soundboard intact. The Grand Concert was the first model in the series, it has a 630mm scale length and the neck joins the body at the 12th fret with a total of 18 frets. The FE Series was available in either American Mahogany or East Indian Rosewood, with a choice of Sitka Spruce or Western Red Cedar soundboard.
