= Supersound Electronic Products =

Supersound guitars are a range of solid body electric guitars manufactured in the late 1950s and early 1960s by Supersound Electronic Products. They include the earliest solid body electric guitars and basses to be commercially produced in the United Kingdom.

== Supersound Electronic Products ==
Supersound Electronic Products was founded by Alan and Mary Wootton in 1952 in Kent. The company produced a range of products including PA systems, projector accessories, music accessories, guitar amplifiers and from 1958 electric guitars. After a successful later period producing sound attachments for projectors, Alan Wootton died in 1973. The company closed in 1974.

In 1958, the company contracted Jim Burns to help with the design and to manufacture the bodies and necks while the electrics, paint and finish were completed by Alan Wootton. One such example is the Supersound Short Scale Standard, built in 1958. This guitar is the earliest solid body electric guitar to be commercially produced in the UK. Jim Burns left Supersound in December 1958 and formed his own guitar-making company, Burns London in 1960.

=== Important guitars ===
Supersound Short Scale, 1958

The Supersound Short Scale Standard is the earliest solid body electric guitar to be commercially produced in the UK. Built in 1958 while Jim Burns was still working for Supersound, the body of the guitar is pine with mahogany used for the neck. The electrics, paint and finish were completed by Alan Wootton. The electrics are mounted on a large black scratchplate with pickups showing the Supersound logo.

Supersound Single Cutaway Bass, 1958

This Single Cutaway Bass is the earliest solid electric bass to be commercially produced in the UK. Jim Burns built the body and neck with the electronics and finished completed by Alan Wootton.

Supersound Ike Isaacs Short Scale Model, 1958

== 2009 discovery of guitars ==
In 2009, the BBC reported that a collection of 12 rare Supersound guitars had been uncovered in the basement of a house in Cheltenham.

== Notable players and owners ==
- Bob Rogers and Teddy Wadmore of the Ted Taylor Four: Played the first Supersound guitar and bass respectively on the Jack Jackson TV show in late summer 1958.
- Ike Isaacs: "Ike Isaacs Short Scale Model" named after him.
