= Klira =

German string instrument manufacturer

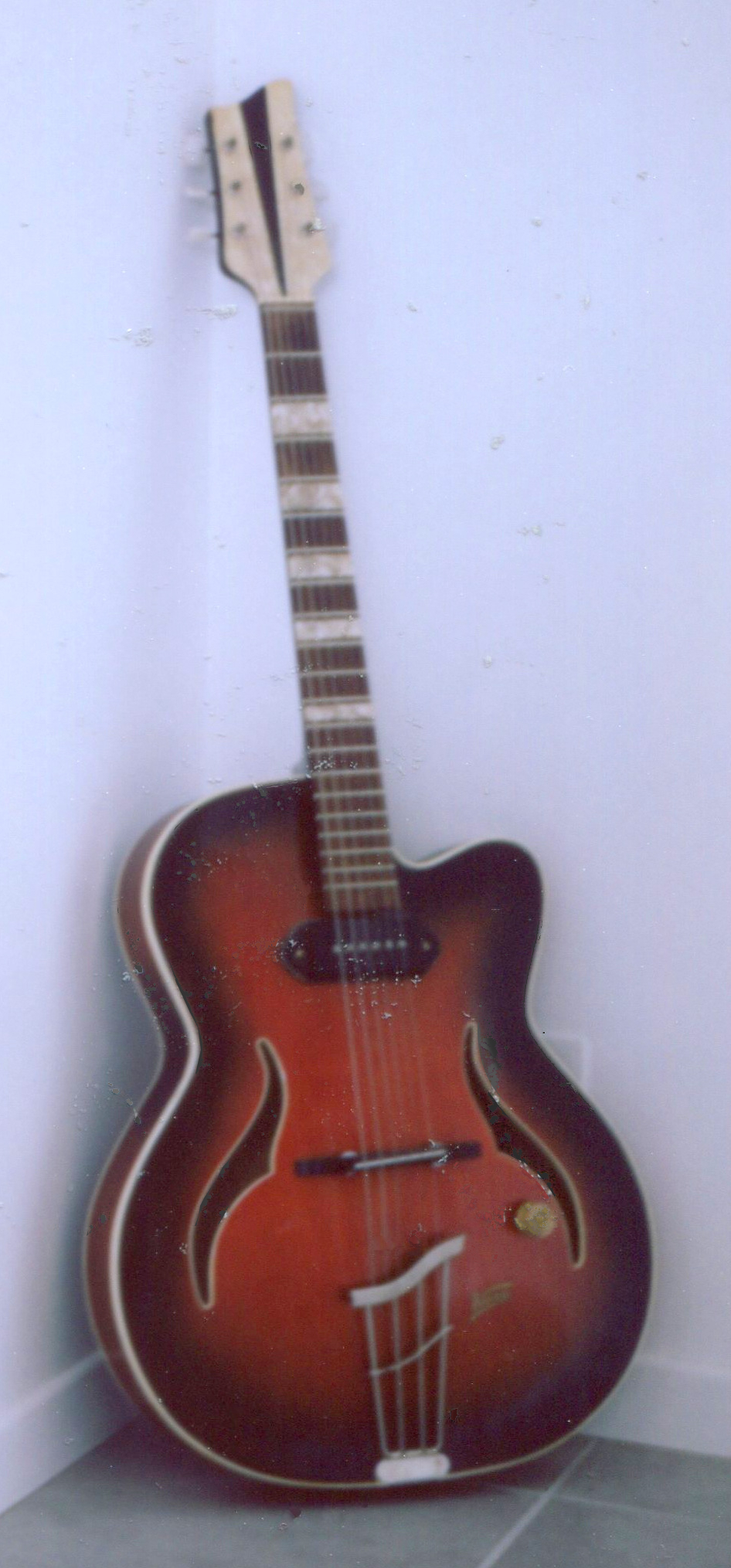
Klira archtop electric guitar

Klira (Otto Johs. Klier GmbH) was a German string instrument manufacturer, from 1887 until 1982. Starting with the classic violin family of instruments, the production range was extended by acoustic and electric guitars around the 1950s.

Klira was founded in 1887 by Johannes Klier in Schönbach, today Luby u Chebu in the Czech Republic. His son Otto Josef Klier took over the company in 1914. Following World War II, the Klier family left the company in 1946. The company was soon re-formed in the Franconia region of Bavaria, West Germany, in the city of Erlangen. This coincides in time and place with the founding of the Framus company by Fred Wilfer, also from Schönbach. In 1950, the Klira company was moved more permanently to Bubenreuth.

== Sources ==
- Tony Bacon, Dave Hunter: Totally Guitar – the definite Guide, Guitar encyclopedia. Backbeat Books, London 2004, ISBN 1-871547-81-4.
