= Jeffrey Yong =

Malaysian Luthier (born 1958)

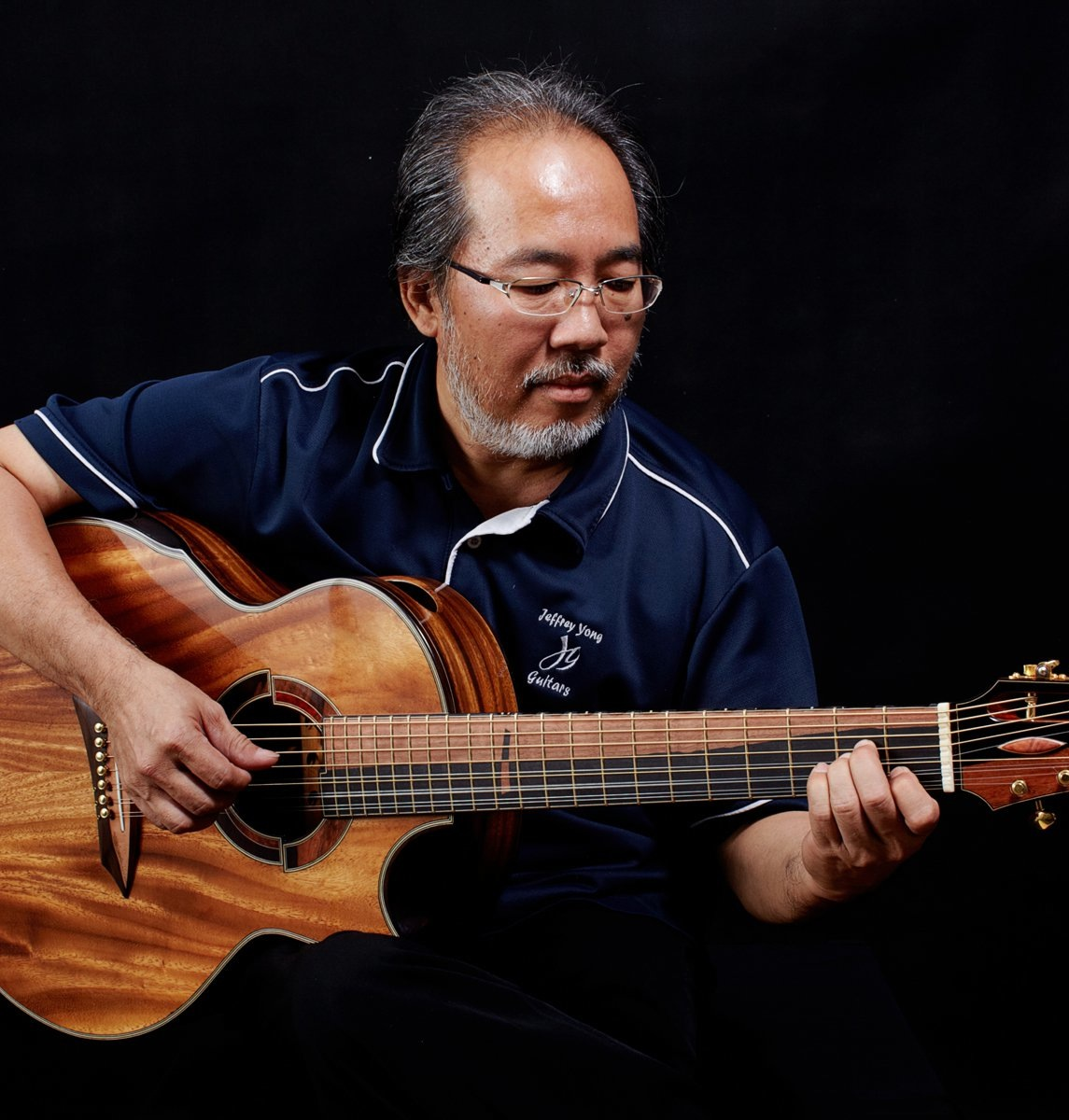
- Jeffrey Yong playing the Seismic 10-string guitar

Background information
- Born: Jeffrey Yong; 29 November 1958 (age 67); Kuala Lumpur, Malaysia
- Occupation: Luthier
- Instruments: Guitar, harpguitar, ukulele, sapelele, bass guitar
- Years active: 1985–present
- Website: Official website

Jeffrey Yong (born 29 November 1958) is a Malaysian luthier noted for using local Malaysian wood in his instruments and for his innovative designs. Yong has exhibited at conventions in the United States, Canada, Japan, Russia and China. He founded the Guitar Institute of Malaysia.

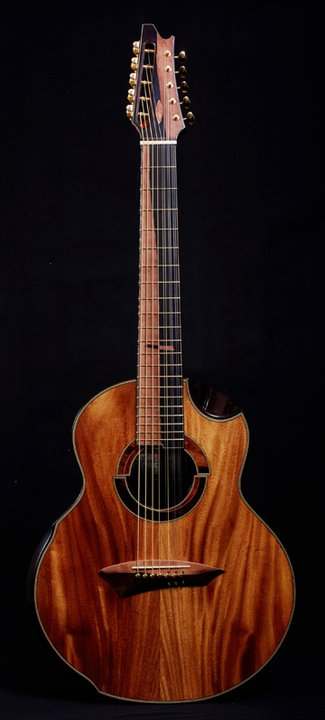
Jeffrey Yong JJ "Seismic" 2011

== Career ==
Born in Kuala Lumpur, Malaysia, Jeffrey Yong started his career in 1976 as a guitar instructor and examiner. He built his first guitar in 1985 from a DIY kit, later traveling abroad to improve his guitar-making skills.

Yong founded the Guitar Institute Malaysia (GIM) in 1993, specializing in teaching different genres of guitar playing and guitar construction. He also taught at the Luthier School International in California. His skills in luthiery were mostly self-taught. He has published articles on guitar-making in several newspapers over an eight-year period, and has appeared at guitar maker conventions in the United States, Canada, Japan, Russia, China and Malaysia.

== Materials ==
After a luthier asked why he was sourcing material from overseas when Malaysia exported good quality wood, Yong looked into the possibility of using local, non-traditional timber, such as monkeypod, rengas, mango, rambutan, and local Diospyros spp. (known as "Malaysian blackwood" or Kayu malam), for building musical instruments. He continued to innovate and gained extensive knowledge of different kinds of timber, especially those from tropical regions.

Yong introduced Malaysian blackwood to other guitar makers during the 1998 GAL convention in Tacoma, Washington, United States. He also pioneered monkeypod as a tonewood and saw it adopted by other luthiers. Using monkeypod wood (Samanea saman or rain tree, formerly known as Albizia saman) to build guitars was not new, but it had not been regarded as a premium tonewood and had previously only been used for aesthetic purposes.

Yong built a guitar almost entirely from monkeypod, which went on to win the blind listening test at the 2006 convention of the Guild of American Luthiers.

Instruments built in Yong's workshop were made by hand with 99 percent local woods, mostly monkeywood, the remaining one percent being the maple veneer used in the bindings. His bracing design and layout were influenced by Martin's X-scalloped patterns, Torres fan bracing and Smallman lattice bracing.

== Achievements ==
Yong's guitars have been exhibited at Healdsburg Guitar Festival, Shanghai Music Festival, and Montreal Guitar Show. At the Montreal show in 2011 he introduced his "JJ Blackie" and his innovative "Seismic", a JJ-shaped 10-string acoustic guitar with Monkeywood body and Blackwood fingerboard (see pictures, right) which featured in Premier Guitar Magazine. The guitar's D and G strings had octave pairs and the B and high E had unison strings.

Yong built almost an entire guitar of monkeypod, and in 2006 it won the blind listening test at the Guild of American Luthiers convention. It was judged to be the best-sounding instrument in terms of tonality, timbre and sustain. Yong was competing against notable luthiers such as Erwin Somogyi, and two of his guitars were ranked in the top three.

Artists who use Yong's guitars have included Don Alder, Farid Ali, Kent Nishimura, Hiroshi Masuda, Shun Ng, Wayan Balawan, Dan LaVoie and Okapi.

== Styles ==
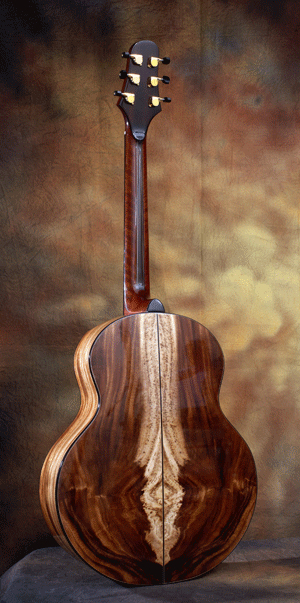
Monkeypod wood from Jeffrey Jumbo

=== Steel string guitars ===
==== JJ (Jeffrey Jumbo) ====
The JJ is a hybrid of a classical guitar and a jumbo. It uses scalloped "X"-bracing, and has a unique bridge with more mass than the conventional bridge. The body shape is a cross between a Jumbo and a Classical Guitar.

Other interesting features are:

- Cutaway bevel – offers more excess to higher frets without sacrificing air mass in the body.
- Sound port – to bring the in-body sound closer to the player.
- Thumb scallop – helps the player utilize the over-the-thumb technique with ease.

==== Other steel strings ====
- OM Guitar
- Seismic Guitarat:
First presented at the Montreal Guitar Show in 2011, it is a 10-string acoustic guitar. It was influenced by the tragic March 2011 earthquake in Japan.
It has a monkeypod body, and a blackwood fretboard and bridge. The headstock is a half-slotted, half-pegged design.The sound hole, back, and bottom strap buttons are appointed unevenly, representative of a seismic shift. To get a chime sound, its D and G strings have octave pairs, and the B and high E have unison strings.

=== Classical Guitars ===
- Tioman I: nylon string, with Torres bracing and body design
- Tioman design: nylon string, has a Torres body shape, with modified lattice bracing
- Tioman III: nylon string, has a Khono design body-shape (larger body) with modified lattice bracing

== Coverage and industry participation ==
Conventions and festivals attended
Year	Name	Place	Achievements
1993	Guitar Institute Malaysia (GIM)	Malaysia	Founder
1998	Guild of American Luthiers (GAL) Convention	Tacoma, Washington, US	Introduction of Malaysian blackwood internationally
2006	Guild of American Luthiers (GAL) Convention	Tacoma, Washington, US	Introduction of monkeypod wood (Samanea saman or rain tree); OM Guitar won the Blind Listening Test; Best sounding guitar in terms of tonality, timbre, and sustain
2011	Montreal Guitar Show		JJ Blackie & Seismic were featured by Premier Guitar Magazine
2012	Kirov Moscow International Guitar Making	Moscow, Russia	Classical Guitar Tioman III won first prize
2012	Sound Messe Osaka	Osaka, Japan	
2013	Malaysian International Guitar Festival (MIGFEST)	Kuala Lumpur, Malaysia	
2013	Healdsburg Guitar Festival	Santa Rosa, California	Featured in Guitar Player magazine
2013	Tokyo Handcrafted Guitar Show	Tokyo, Japan	
2014	Malaysian International Guitar Festival (MIGFEST)	Kuala Lumpur, Malaysia	
2014	Guild of American Luthiers (GAL) Convention	Tacoma, Washington, US	
2015	Osaka Music Festival	Osaka, Japan	
2016	Shanghai Music Festival	Shanghai, China	

Media coverage
Year	Media	Title	Notes
2009	The Star newspaper	"Jeffrey Yong promises to teach how to make a guitar in two weeks"	
2012	The Straits Times newspaper	"Strum a Mango"	
2014	The Star newspaper	"Guitar Gods of a Different Sort"	
2016	Create with Malaysia	"A Luthier's Song"	
2017	Sin Chiew newspaper	"Making Musical Instrument with Non-Traditional Wood"	
