= Flaxwood Guitars =

Finnish musical instrument company

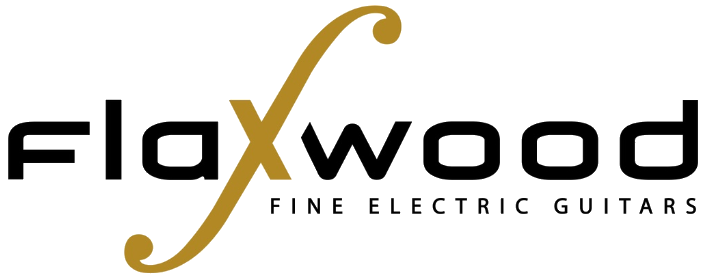
- Type: Osakeyhtiö / Ltd.
- Industry: Musical instrument
- Founded: 2005; 21 years ago
- Headquarters: Joensuu, Finland
- Area served: Worldwide
- Key people: Mika Räty (CEO)
- Products: Electric guitars and instrument parts
- Divisions: Wood Fiber Technologies Inc.
- Website: flaxwood.com

Flaxwood is a Finnish manufacturer of guitars and instrument parts based in North Karelia. The company manufactures instruments from natural fibre-reinforced thermoplastic through a patented injection moulding process. Flaxwood was founded in 2005 following a research project on natural fibre-reinforced thermoplastic composites led by Heikki Koivurova. A prototype was developed initially in 2003 with the design input of Luthier Veijo Rautia and two years later Flaxwood introduced their first line of guitars. In 2011, they released a line of hybrid guitars.

== Design ==
=== Material ===
The body, neck and backplate of a Flaxwood guitar are made of a fibre-reinforced thermoplastic composite. The composite material, also known as Kareline FLX, was developed through a collaboration between Heikki Koivurova (industrial designer from Joensuu), Kareline (a Finnish manufacturer of composite materials), and the University of Joensuu. It consists of small wood fibres, in this case from recycled northern spruce, mixed with a thermoplastic bonding agent. The mixture is injection moulded, with the injection points placed so the fibres run lengthwise through the neck and spread outward from the injection point through the body. The material is meant to give a consistent sound and to hold up to changes in humidity and climate better than wood.

=== Manufacturing ===
Flaxwood is based in Joensuu, Finland. The bodies and necks are injection moulded, then assembled and finished by hand.

== Products ==
=== Guitars ===
==== Flaxwood Series ====
The guitar models of the regular line come with approximately similar features and various pick-up configurations. The bodies are semi-hollow with a backplate and come with either a Gotoh 510UB hardtail bridge, a Gotoh GE-103B tune-o-matic bridge or a Schaller LP tremolo bridge. The glued in necks feature 22 medium jumbo frets, a 25.5" scale length and a 1-11/16" Tune-X Tuning System nut. In 2016 the range was reorganized into three series: Hybrid, with Flaxwood necks bolted onto wooden bodies; Classic, which took in the existing models such as the Äijä, Laine and Rautia; and Master, with different pickups, finishes or hardware from the Classic models.

=== Instrument Components ===
Since 2011, Flaxwood has launched a line of components for music instruments such as bolt-on guitar necks, guitar blanks and fingerboard blanks for bowed string instruments. Some of the components are used by other companies like the German violin manufacturer Mezzo-Forte.

== Notable players ==
- Les Dudek
- Bugs Henderson
- Phil Palmer
- Dean Parks
- Waddy Wachtel
