= Trembita Musical Instrument Factory =

The "Trembita" Musical Instrument Factory manufactures stringed instruments. Since 1948 it has manufactured banduras, a Ukrainian instrument; it also produces guitars. The factory is located in Lviv, Ukraine.

== History ==
The Lviv factory of musical instruments known as "Trembita" is primarily a factory for the manufacture of guitars and mandolins. A workshop for the serial production of banduras was established there and since 1964 the factory has produced various types of banduras designed by Professor Vasyl Herasymenko.

== Bandura manufacturing ==
=== Soviet period ===
Banduras were made at the factory back in 1948. These early instruments were set up for production by Oleh Hasiuk. Some 19 instruments were made. These instruments were diatonically tuned with 34 strings, however they did not have sufficient volume and did not allow the player to play in different keys easily.

Continual serial manufacture of banduras was set up in 1964. Vasyl Herasymenko developed an acceptable model instrument and also developed a serial process for the mass production of banduras.

From 1964-68 some 300 experimental instruments were produced. These instruments became known as the "Lviviankas" . The first models had 58 strings which included 17 bass strings. This particular instrument differed from counterparts made at the Chernihiv Musical Instruments Factory in that the body of the instrument was made of bent glued sections like that of a mandolin, rather than hewn out of a solid piece. These glued sections were made out of curly maple rather than the more traditional willow. This change was because the willow used for the backs of the hewn banduras was not a commercial material and was difficult to obtain.

Children's sizes were later also developed by Vasyl Herasymenko and a series of these instruments were also manufactured at this time.

Later further refinements meant that a 15 bass instrument was developed having the same range. This new instrument eradicated many of the minor defects which appeared in the previous models.

Herasymenko developed an ingenious mechanism which rapidly and easily retuned the instrument. In 1975-84 the Lviv factory, on the basis of the 15 bass instrument began to serially manufacture concert instruments with a mechanism. All in all some 80 numbered banduras were produced.

In 1976 the magazine "Narodna Tvorchist' ta etnohrafia" reported that the Lviv experimental factory was planning to manufacture 2300 instruments a year. In 1979 it was reported that they were planning to manufacture 3000 instruments per year. The minister of industry D. Babenko stated that the number of concert banduras with mechanisms manufactured will grow to 1500 in 1980. Unfortunately the plans were not fulfilled.

Later production of concert bandura stopped completely because the factory was unable to obtain lathes of suitable quality to manufacture the mechanism parts.

In order to overcome this problem in 1984 Herasymenko simplified the design of the mechanism, and also redesigned and simplified production. This required him to alter the shape of the instrument and as a result the quality of the sound produced by these instruments changed.

This redesigned instrument had a mechanism whose levers were placed at the end of the instrument and began to be produced in 1985.

In 1988 Herasymenko began work on a children's concert instrument with mechanism. Initially he set up production of a standard children's size instrument and an instrument with concert mechanism. This instrument is of smaller size, continuing to have 15 basses, but having only 56 strings rather than 58 with a range up to top G.

=== Post Ukrainian independence ===
In the 1990s after the proclamation of Ukrainian independence the economy changed from a Soviet to being market driven one. Many factories could not make the transition and closed down. Others had their production had dwindled to a trickle. Of the 17 factories that manufactured musical instruments only the Lviv factory is remained open, however production grown to a trickle.

Of the original 8-12 craftsmen there are only 3 men were left in the bandura section of the factory. Many trained craftsmen left to go to facilities where the pay was more lucrative and the fine skills were not required. Recently there were major problems when one of the craftsman who made the fine details for the mechanism died and a new craftsman had to be found and trained.

As the economy of Ukraine continued to sink to new lows, efforts were made to separate the bandura workshop from the factory. Many of these efforts were detrimental to the ongoing function of the bandura workshop as they often did not take into account many of the hidden factors and costs involved in manufacturing banduras. The bandura workshop was as a result for many years supported by the manufacturing of guitars.

In 1997 only 14 banduras were made.

In 1999 only 24 banduras were made and the bandura making section of the factory only remained open only due to orders from North America.

After 2000 orders began to be received which stopped the factory form closing the bandura workshop.

In 2006 the President of Ukraine - Viktor Yushchenko released 10 million Hryvni for the support of bandura art in Ukraine. As a result, groups which had for many years been without instruments or had required new instruments were able to place orders for banduras. The sudden change has had its detrimental effects on bandura manufacturing. Currently there is a 3-year wait for orders, the price of banduras has tripled according to market demand and there is a perceptible change in the quality of the instruments being manufactured.

== Bandura types and models ==
=== Previous models ===
- Diatonic bandura (1948)
- Prima bandura (17 basses) (1964)
- Prima bandura (15 basses)
- Prima bandura (15 basses) with mechanism.
- Children's size bandura

=== Current models ===
Currently 4 models are available

- 3/4 size bandura
- 3/4 size bandura with mechanism
- Full size bandura
- Full size bandura with mechanism

=== Future models ===
In 2000 they intend in enlarge their production and including a new Kharkiv bandura with mechanism in its manufacturing plans.

A number of experimental diatonic Kharkiv banduras have been made.

Prototypes of an electric bandura with internal pickups have been developed and are planned for production.
