= Lotus (guitar) =

Instrument manufacturer

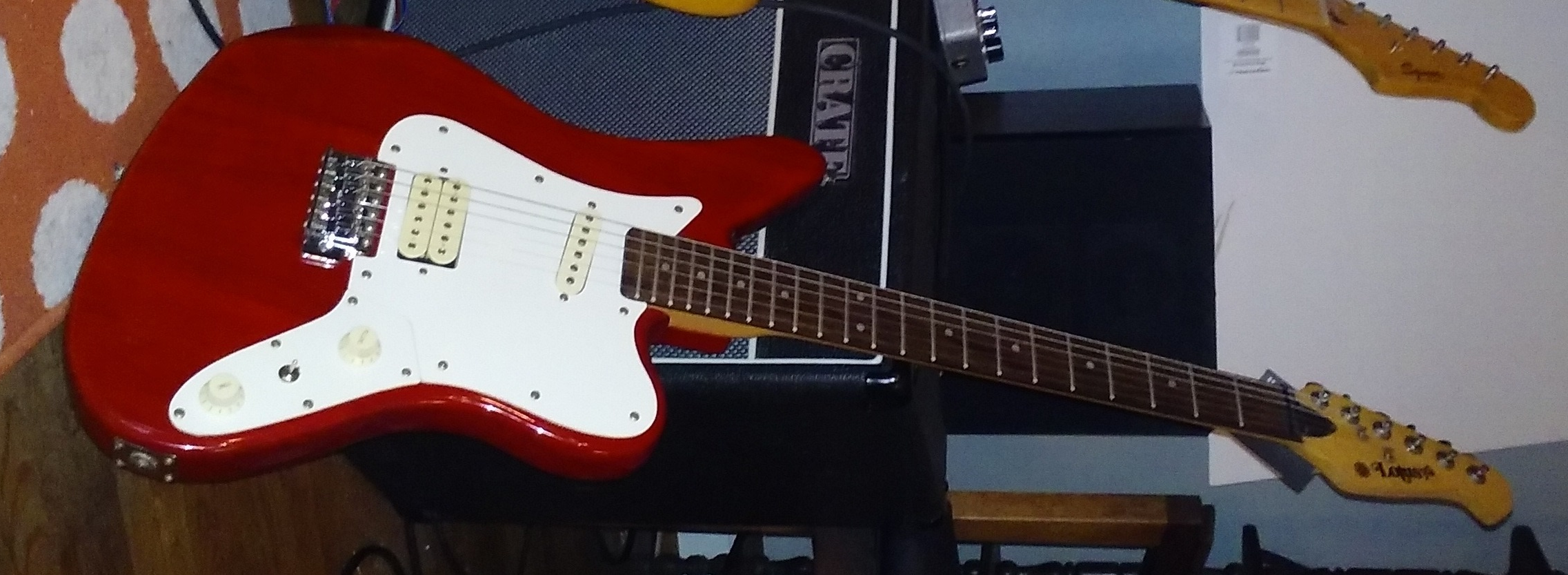
Lotus from the mid 1990s is in the shape of a mutated fender jazzmaster.

Lotus was a house brand belonging to Midco International of Illinois. The brand was applied to guitars, basses, banjos, and mandolins made in various Asian factories from the late 1970s until the early 2000s. Lotus guitars were usually copies of better-known, up-market brand-name guitars, such as the Gibson Les Paul and the Fender Stratocaster.

== History ==
Lotus was the brand's name, positioned on the headstocks of a line of good-quality electric guitars that are speculated to be made by at least one Japanese factory. Confirming information is difficult or impossible to find. However, based upon the strong similarities between one particular Lotus model (the L660I), and the Washburn Eagle, many in the guitar community believe the Lotus versions were built at least for a time by Yamaki, as the Washburn was known to have been. Others, after deep comparison and examination of build techniques, feel this model was made by Morris/Moridaira. This lines up as more plausible as other lotus models have characteristics of Moridaira builds.

The majority of Lotus guitars were lower-cost items and, as such, were produced by Samick and Cort. This is evidenced by the hardware used, build styles, and sometimes the presence of original inspection and model stickers. Rumors and guesses abound suggesting that Matsumoku (maker of Aria Pro II) and Fuji-Gen Gakki (maker of many Ibanez models) produced Lotus guitars, but hard evidence of this has been elusive. The time frame is also a factor as rising costs in Japan had sent many smaller importers of guitars to Korea or even Taiwan for the very cheapest units as early as the mid-'70s. Midco focused on lower-priced options through the '80s, '90s, and into the 2000s until the company was purchased by Musicorp. As with other brands, Midco needed to change sources for cheaper labor, moving from Korea, then to India and China.

== Versions ==
The most common and good-quality Lotus guitars were usually manufactured by Samick and others in Korea and India. The top-of-the-line early 1980s models were made both in Korea by Cort Guitars (early neck-through models) and in Japan by Morris/Moridaira (neck-through models, set-neck Washburn Eagle copies, and decent Gibson Les Paul copies).

Like the Matsumoku guitars of that era, both the early Korean Cort and Japanese Morris-made Lotus guitars are of high quality.

Lotus guitars are no longer in production. While the low-end guitars have only experienced a minimal gain in value, the high-end models usually range from $100–$300 and are becoming quite collectible.

Chauntelle DuPree of the band Eisley used a Lotus Stratocaster copy for many years on tour and to record. While the quality of this guitar would not typically be considered to be on a professional level, it did provide an inexpensive platform for experimentation and upgrade (with non-Lotus parts), which resulted in a unique-sounding instrument.

The Moridaira-made Lotus guitars are the rarest and hardest to find as Lotus/Morris made them at for only 2–3 years. These guitars all are solid-bodied and were made in the same factory as Tokai. Few models are thought to have come from Lotus/Morris:

1. The Lotus 660I, a Washburn Eagle copy. A double cutaway (batwing) guitar with a solid body, 3 per side tuners on headstock, rosewood fingerboard with brass inlays, brass nut, and neck-through construction, with 2 exposed humbucker pickups. This seems to have only been offered in ivory gloss.
2. More conventional Gibson Les Paul copies, are usually only seen in gloss black or tobacco burst. These were set neck, and bolt-on neck, with typical hardware. However, Korean copies of the Moridaira styles are known to exist, and may indicate that no Les Paul styles were made in Japan.
3. Model L-1000 guitar and L1500 bass are true neck-through models that have hallmarks of Morris builds. These are in the visual style of Alembic and other early 80's pieces, utilizing walnut and white ash in natural finishes.

These models are easily on par with the Matsumoku-made Westbury and the high-end neck-through Vantage guitars.

The Lotus L670B is often cited as being made in Japan but was a Samick-produced instrument, that is identical to the Hondo H-702 All-Star, and the Mako Traditional Series TB-2. The model is a direct copy of the 1980-1982/3 Fender "Bullet"(MIA and MIJ) other than having switches instead of buttons, and a different headstock shape. There were no letters on the headstock.
