= Westfield (guitars) =

Scottish-based guitar company, started in 1989

- Product type: Musical instruments
- Current owner: RotoSound
- Country: Scotland, United Kingdom
- Introduced: 1989; 2022 (relaunch)
- Discontinued: 2013
- Previous owners: P&R Howard Music Ltd.

Westfield Guitars is a UK based guitar brand, owned by string manufacturer RotoSound. Previously owned by Scotland based P&R Howard Music Ltd. from its inception until their closure in 2013, it produced and sold electric, acoustic, classical and bass guitars, primarily copies of popular Fender and Gibson models. Revived in 2022 by RotoSound, they now focus on the acoustic guitar market.

== History ==
Westfield Guitars was established in 1989 from the owner Paul Howard's garage, turning over £19,000 in their first year. The company grew to a turnover of £4.6 million in 2005 and operated out of a warehouse in East Kilbride. They were the largest distributor of musical instruments in Scotland.

Notable players include Danny Jones of McFly and Jason Mraz. Stevie Hay and Charles Boyle of Scottish rock band Felon both played Westfield guitars over the years. Hay worked with Westfield across 15 years and had various custom guitars made, most of which remained in his own collection.

The company went out of business in September 2013.

Upon the brands relaunch under RotoSound, the company offered a veriety of shapes, in both the entry-level "Performer" series, and a premium "Artist" range.
