= Samick =

South Korean musical instrument manufacturing company

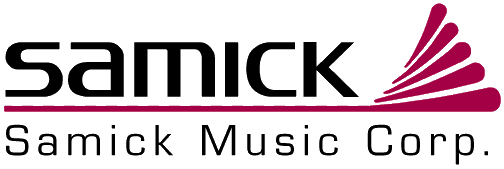
- Industry: Musical instruments
- Founded: 1958; 68 years ago
- Founder: Lee Hyo-Ik
- Headquarters: Eumseong County, South Korea
- Area served: Worldwide
- Products: Pianos, string instruments, and wind instruments
- Brands: Greg Bennett; Kohler & Campbell; Pramberger; San Mateo; Seiler; Silvertone; Stony River; Wm. Knabe & Co.
- Website: smcmusic.com

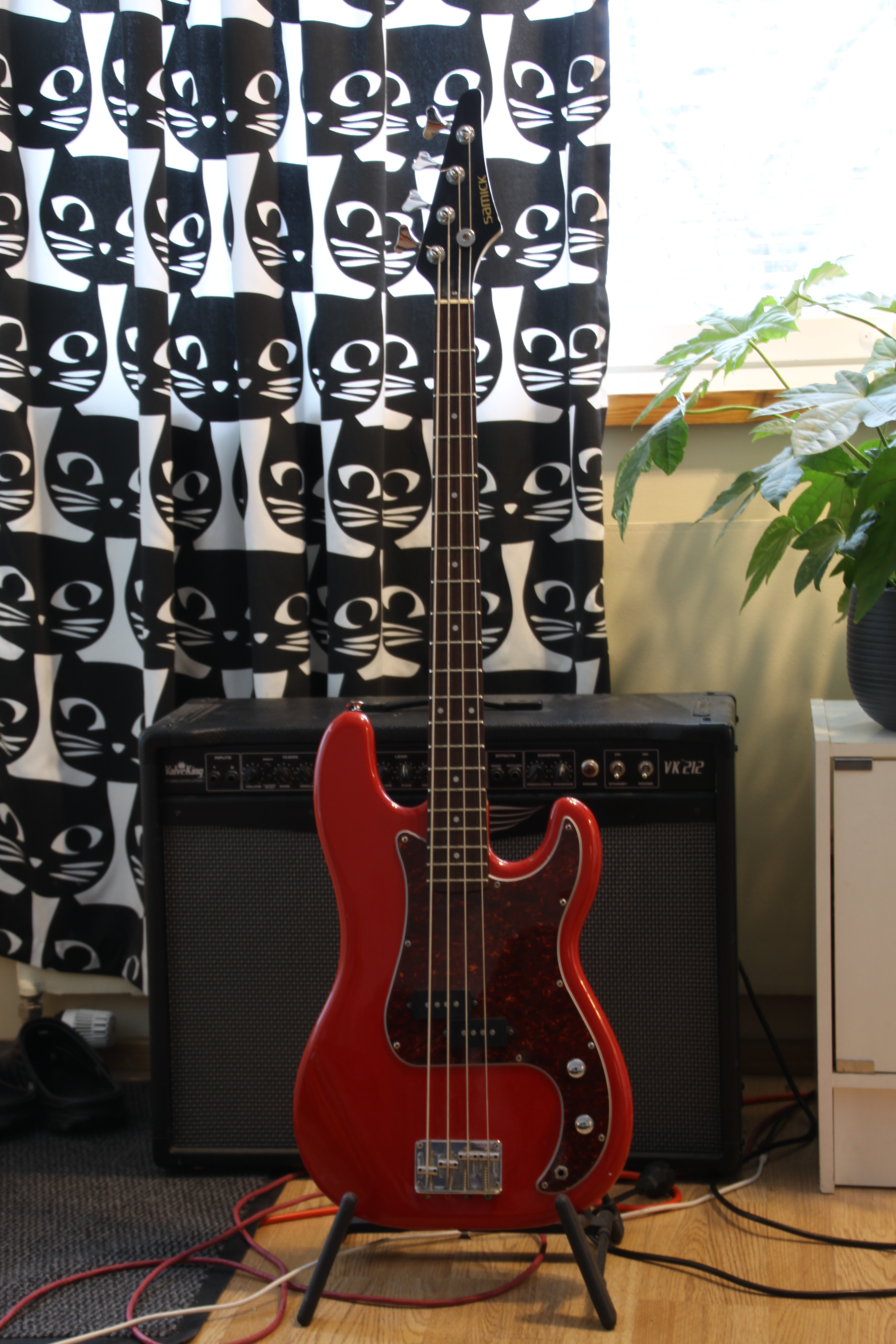
Typical Samick electric bass guitar

Samick Musical Instruments Co., Ltd. (Korean: 삼익악기KRX: 002450, also known as Samick) is a South Korean musical instrument manufacturer. Founded in 1958 as Samick Pianos, it is now one of the world's largest musical instrument manufacturers and an owner of shares in several musical instrument manufacturing companies.

Apart from its own brand, Samick manufactures musical instruments through its subsidiary brands, including pianos under the brands Wm. Knabe & Co., Pramberger, Kohler & Campbell, and Seiler; and guitars under the brands Greg Bennett, Silvertone, Stony River, and San Mateo.

== Operations ==
In 1992, Samick built its P.T. Samick factory in Cileungsi, near Bogor, Indonesia. This factory produces the majority of instruments that Samick makes.

North American operations are performed from its North American Corporate Headquarters in Gallatin, Tennessee (completed July 2007). This 214,000 sq ft (19,900 m^{2}) facility is responsible for all administrative activities for the North American market, as well as acting as a distribution center for its guitars and acoustic/digital pianos. The facility manufactures of a small number of acoustic pianos, sold under the Knabe brand.

== Guitar manufacturing and OEM supply ==
When Matsumoku closed in 1987 Samick inherited most of Matsumoku's OEM manufacturing contracts which included building guitars for Aria Pro II, Vantage, and Washburn, as well as Matsumoku's in-house brand Westone. Samick had previously done business with Matsumoku in the early 1980s when Matsumoku built some Hondo guitars for Samick. Samick acquired the Vantage license from Matsumoku a year before the company closed and continued to build Vantage guitars for U.S. distributor Music Technology Inc. before taking over the brand fully in 1990. Samick continued to make Matsumoku's Westone guitars until 1991 and Vantage guitars until 1998.

Samick also built Marlin guitars for British Music Strings Ltd between 1986 and 1988, and Squier from 1989 to 1991, as well as guitars for Epiphone, and Charvette by Charvel during the 1990s. When Gibson Guitars relaunched Kramer Guitars after buying the brand out of bankruptcy in 1997, Gibson utilized Samick to build the new Kramers from 1998 until 2009.

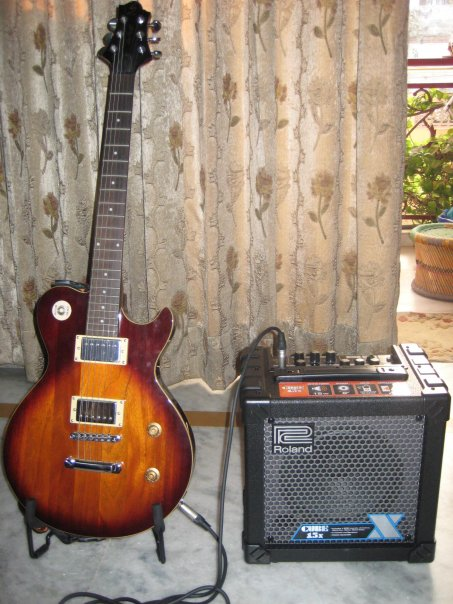
A Greg Bennett Avion AV1 with a Roland Cube 15x amp

Samick established its own brand of guitars in 1990 and partnered with a number of different makers, including Greg Bennett and J.T. Riboloff (a former luthier at Gibson). Samick continues to supply guitars to other companies sold under the brand names Squier, Epiphone, Washburn, Hohner, Silvertone and others.

=== Greg Bennett Guitars ===
American luthier Greg Bennett designed a line of guitars for Samick. The guitars have pickups designed by Seymour Duncan, machine heads from Grover, and bridges by Wilkinson. Woods used include ovangkol and ebony from Africa, rosewood from India, and rock maple from North America. Instruments under the Greg Bennett label are electric, acoustic and archtop guitars, electric and acoustic basses, mandolins, banjos, ukuleles and autoharps.

Bennett died on 29 June 2020, at the age of 69.

== Piano manufacturing and brand management ==
Samick also has a wide range of pianos. Its acoustic piano brands include Samick, Pramberger, Wm. Knabe & Co., Kohler & Campbell, and Gebrüder Schulze; and it has digital piano brands of Kohler, Samick Digital, and Symphonia. Samick recently announced the discontinuation of the Sohmer & Co. brand.

In 2004, Samick gained controlling interest in competitor Young Chang, but antitrust rulings in the U.S. and Korea ended the merger a year later. From 2003 to 2009 Samick was associated with German C. Bechstein Pianofortefabrik.

In addition, Bechstein and Samick have a joint venture factory in Shanghai, China. In October 2008, Samick announced its purchase of Seiler, another German piano company, that is generally agreed to compete with Bechstein at both price point and overall quality. The announcement raises questions about the continued viability of relationship between Samick and Bechstein .

In late 2009, Samick acquired a 16.5% share of Steinway Musical Instruments. By November 2010, Samick's share in Steinway Musical Instruments increased to 32%. In 2013, John Paulson outbid Samick when Steinway and Sons was taken private.

== Other businesses ==
In 1975, Samick Pianos, as the company was known at that time, created an archery department and began building bows. In 1990, this division was spun off as Samick Sports Co., Ltd. In 2016, the company was restructured and its name changed to Samick Archery Co., Ltd. Since 1996, its products have been used to attain several Olympic gold medals, mostly by Korean athletes. Besides Olympic-level archery equipment, Samick also manufactures the very popular budget-oriented Sage and Polaris hunting bows.
