= RainSong =

American musical instrument manufacturer

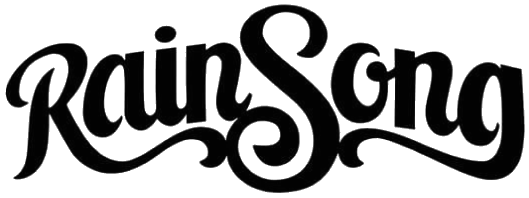
- Type: Private
- Industry: Musical instrument
- Founded: 1982; 44 years ago
- Founder: John Decker
- Defunct: November 30, 2023; 2 years ago
- Headquarters: Woodinville, Washington, United States
- Products: Steel-string acoustic guitars
- Website: rainsong.com

RainSong was a musical instrument manufacturer company based in Woodinville, Washington. RainSong made carbon fiber (graphite) bodied steel-string acoustic guitars. The company closed in late 2023.

== Company ==
RainSong Graphite Guitars was a guitar manufacturing company originally based in Maui, Hawaii and moved to Woodinville Washington to allow for easier distribution. RainSong manufactured approximately four or five guitars a day, producing around five hundred to one thousand in a year. RainSong guitars cost $2,000 to $4,000 depending on the model.

== RainSong body styles ==
RainSong offered five different body styles of their guitars within several different “series”. Each is designed for a different effect and sound quality. Some are made to be louder or softer or just to be more visually pleasing or comfortable. Each of their series are based around an idea or concept. As of 2017 their series collections are named “Concert Hybrid Series” which are made to be good harmony guitars, “Hybrid Series” which are described to have a mellow blend effect on the tone at a more affordable price point in comparison to the other styles, “classic Series” which are engineered to have crystalline clarity in their tone, “Concert Series” which have a warmer tone to them, and the “Black Ice Series” which feature intricate design patterns on the body of the guitar, and every guitar is unique in both appearance and tone.
