= Freshman Guitars =

Scottish musical instrument maker

Freshman
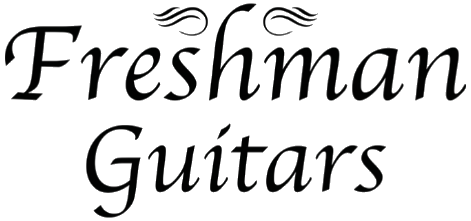
- Type: Private
- Industry: Musical instruments
- Founded: 2002; 24 years ago in Scotland
- Products: Acoustic and classical guitars, ukuleles
- Website: freshmandirect.com

Freshman Guitars is a Scottish manufacturing company founded in 2002 by Sean Kelly, The company is currently part of Access All Areas Distribution, based in East Kilbride.

For Tartan Week 2007 in New York City, Freshman created a special guitar and it was the limited Black Tartan model. It was introduced by Sandi Thom during the fashion show at the "Dressed To Kilt party" in Manhattan. Actor Sean Connery was there, to talk to Sandi about the new guitar.

In 2014, their Songwriter Series SONGOTSB model was awarded Guitar and Bass Magazine's 'Best Acoustic Guitar Under £1000' award.

Current range of products by Freshman includes acoustic and classical guitars and ukuleles.
