= Peavey Electronics =

American audio equipment manufacturer

Peavey Electronics Corporation
- Type: Private
- Founded: 1965
- Founder: Hartley Peavey
- Headquarters: Meridian, Mississippi, United States
- Key people: Hartley Peavey (CEO)
- Products: Audio equipment, Amplifiers, Cabinets
- Revenue: US$271 million (Est.)
- Number of employees: 2,400
- Subsidiaries: Peavey Electronics Europe, Ltd.
- Website: peavey.com

Peavey Electronics Corporation is a privately owned American company which designs, develops, manufactures, and markets professional audio equipment. Headquartered in Meridian, Mississippi, Peavey is one of the largest audio equipment manufacturers in the world.

== History ==
Hartley Peavey "dreamed of becoming a rock star," having built his first amplifier in 1957. He founded Peavey Electronics in 1965.

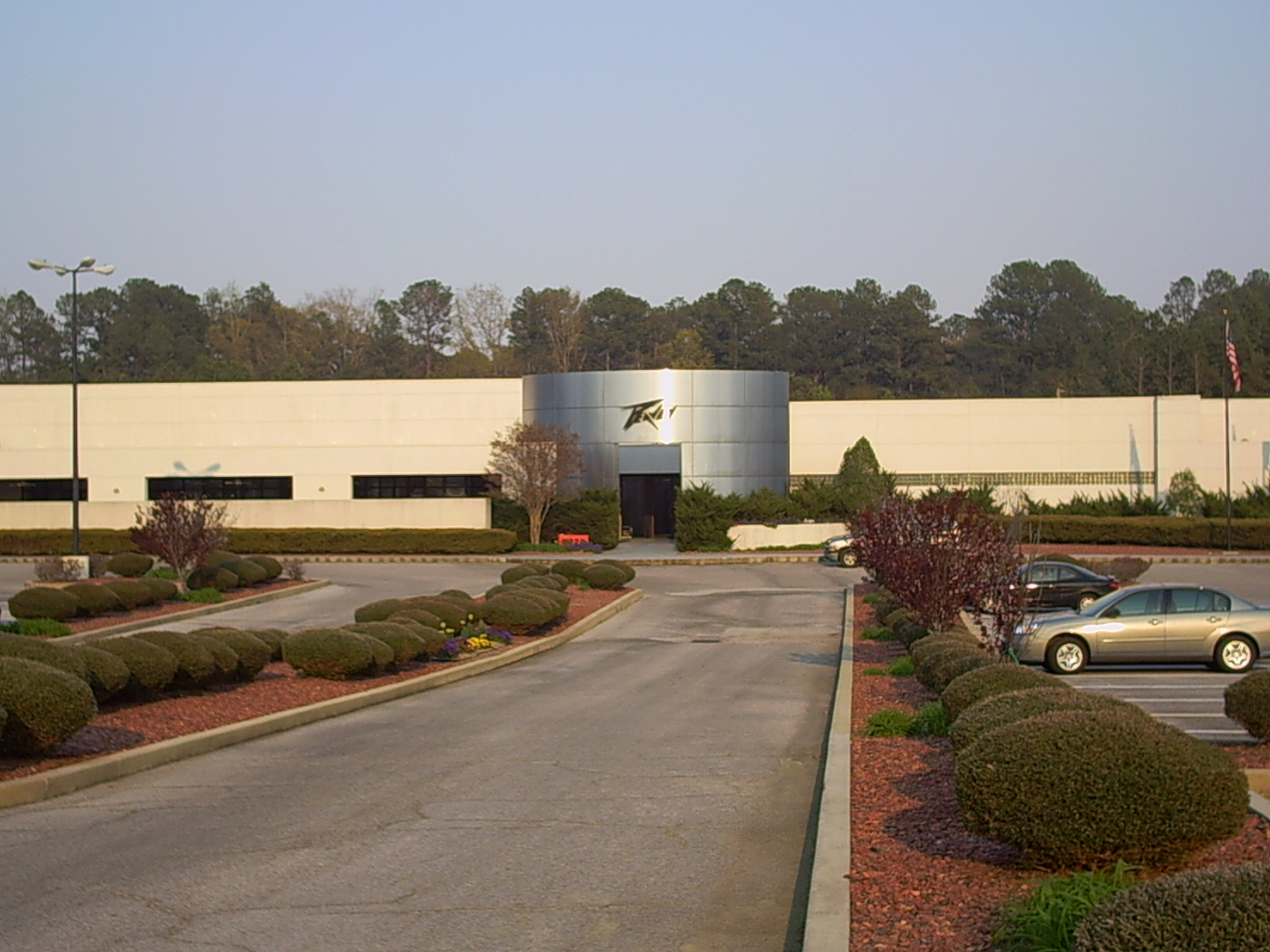
Peavey Headquarters in Meridian, Mississippi

Peavey Electronics once owned approximately 1,500,000 square feet (140,000 m^{2}; 34 acres) of warehouse space across North America, Europe and Asia. However, the vast majority of their products have been manufactured overseas since 2004.

In 2014, Peavey closed its U.K. distribution and manufacturing operations, citing the fact that the lower cost and advanced techniques of Chinese manufacturing had rendered it unsustainable. That same year, Peavey closed its A Street plant in Meridian, Mississippi, and laid off nearly 100 employees. In 2019, Peavey laid off another 30 employees at its U.S. office/warehouse. In 2023, Peavey announced a U.S. Distribution partnership with the Canadian guitar manufacturer Riversong Guitars during the 2023 NAMM Show in Anaheim, California

== Products ==
Peavey Electronics owns eight brands: MediaMatrix, Architectural Acoustics, PVDJ, Crest Audio, Composite Acoustic, Sanctuary Series, Budda Amplification, and Trace Elliot. The company still holds 180 patents, and at one time its product range boasted more than 2000 designs. Although Peavey Electronics produces a wide variety of equipment, a few designs stand out as a result of their popularity or use by prominent professionals.

=== 5150, 6505, 6534+ series guitar amplifiers ===
The 5150 series of amplifier speaker cabinets were the result of a collaboration with Eddie Van Halen. The 5150 series was preceded by the VTM-60/VTM-120 amps, among the first "non-hot rodded" amps. The 5150 has gained popularity with modern hard rock, hardcore punk and metal bands and guitarists due to its large amount of distortion. Jerry Cantrell of Alice in Chains used this amplifier before he worked with Friedman Amplification on a signature amp. While touring with Van Halen, Cantrell asked Eddie Van Halen, "if I could buy [one] off him at the end of the tour with them, and when I got home there were three full stacks and two guitars waiting for me." In 2004, Peavey and Eddie Van Halen parted ways, with Eddie taking the 5150 brand name with him. This resulted in the renaming of the amplifier as the 'Peavey 6505', with slightly updated styling but original circuitry. The 5150 II, which contains an extra preamp tube for more headroom and gain on the Rhythm channel, is the old equivalent to the new 6505+. In 2010, Peavey released a new amplifier for the 6505 line, the 6534+. It is much like the 6505+, but the 6534 has EL34 power tubes instead of the 6L6 power tubes on the standard 6505 amplifiers.

=== Bandit series guitar amplifiers ===
The Bandit amp series are solid-state combo guitar amplifiers. The Bandit amplifiers were introduced in 1980. The earliest model Bandits had a power rating of 50 watts RMS into an 8 ohm speaker. The power rating has gradually increased over time, and current model Bandits are rated at 80 watts RMS into 8 ohms, and 100 watts RMS into 4 ohms. In the mid-1990s, the Bandit was used to introduce Peavey's proprietary TransTube circuitry, a solid-state technology aimed at emulating the sound of tube amplifiers. In 2023, Guitar Player listed it as their favorite solid state amplifier under $500, and praised its "heroic reliability".

==== Bandit models ====
- Bandit (1980)
- Solo Series Bandit (1981–1983)
- Solo Series Bandit 65 (1983–1986)
- Solo Series Bandit 75 (1987–1988)
- Solo Series Bandit 112 (1988–1995)
- TransTube Series Bandit 112 (1996–1999)
- TransTube Series 112, made in US (2000–2004)
- TransTube Series II Bandit 112, made in China (2004–2006)
- Peavey Bandit with Transtube Technology Made in China (2006–present)

=== Classic series guitar amplifiers ===
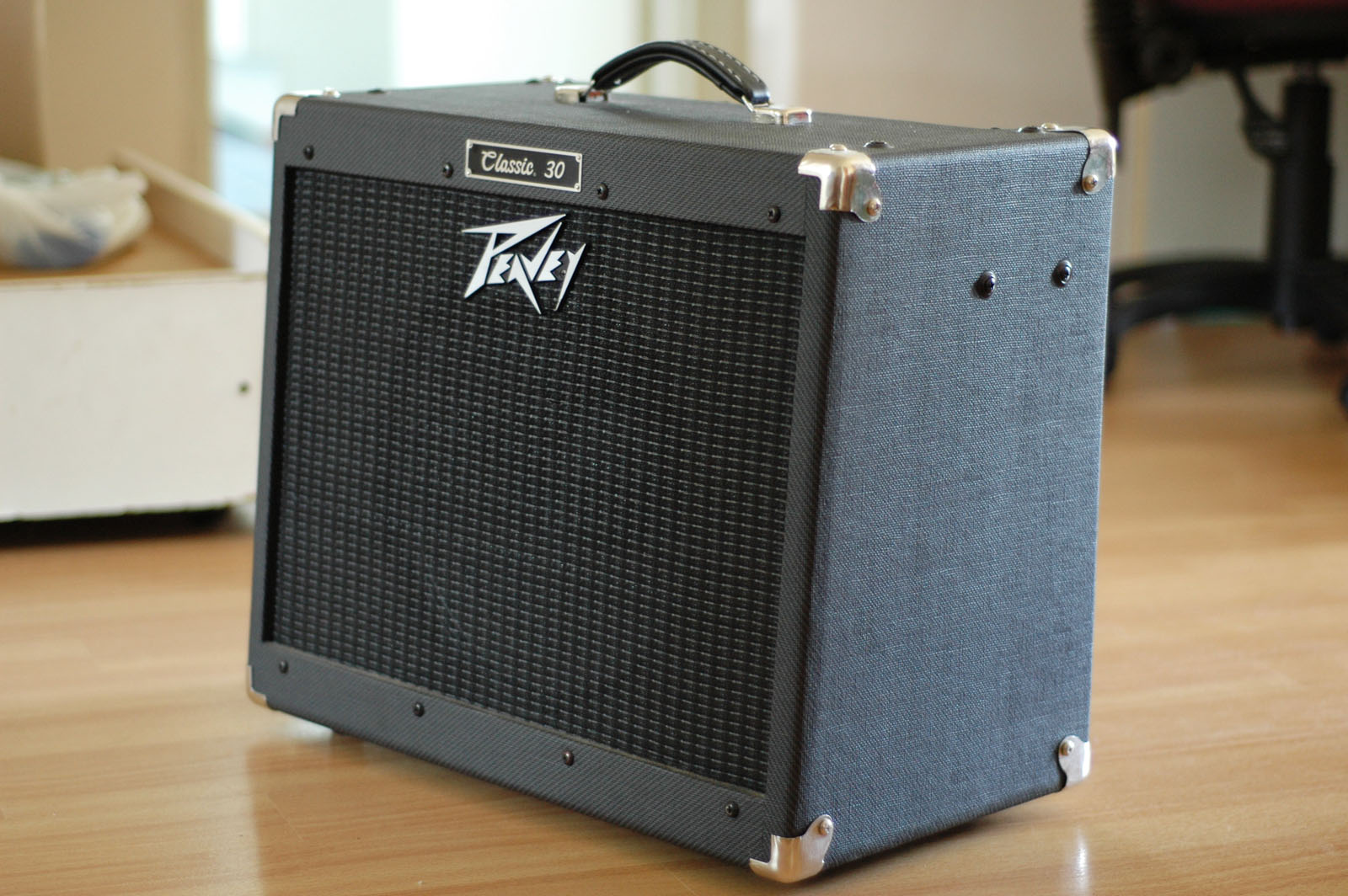
A Peavey Classic 30 amplifier

This is Peavey's line of guitar amplifiers made specifically for blues, jazz, and classic rock players.

The original Classic series amplifiers were introduced in the 1970s and were originally called the Peavey 'Vintage' series. The first releases used 6C10 tubes in the pre-amp, which was later changed to a solid-state pre-amp. All versions use matched 6L6GC power-amp tubes.

You can tell if an amp is the 6C10 version if it has a presence knob or not, as the presence knob was replaced by a master volume knob on the solid-state preamp version.

The Original 2–12 Vintage is 100 watts, whereas the 6–10 and the 1–15 are only 50 watts The original Classic was a 50 watt amp and two 12-inch speakers and a spring reverb, with two preamps for "clean" and "distortion" channels. They could be used separately, or by plugging the instrument into the "parallel" connection, which fed both preamps, allowing selection of one from the other using a foot switch. The instrument could also be plugged into the "series" connection, running first through the "clean" channel and feeding that into the "distortion" channel, providing a means of over driving the distortion preamp, creating a much more versatile method of producing distortion. The current line of "Classic" series amplifiers consist of three variations of the "Classic" model, the Classic 30 with a single 12-inch speaker and the Classic 50 with two twelve-inch speakers or four ten-inch speakers. There are two variations of the "Delta Blues" model, the Delta Blues with one fifteen-inch speaker or two ten-inch speakers. They use 12AX7 preamp tubes, EL84 power tubes, and have spring reverb tanks. From 1994 to 1997, a 15 watts amp with a 10 inches speaker was also produced, the Peavey Classic 20.

=== CS series power amplifiers ===
The CS series amplifiers (mainly the CS800) are some of the most used amplifiers in the world, and among Peavey's best selling products.

=== JSX series guitar amplifiers ===
The JSX series was designed for Joe Satriani. Satriani was looking for an amplifier that was customized to his style, had every feature he required, and would work in both live and studio applications. This amplifier was reissued as the Peavey XXX II when Joe Satriani's endorsement ended, since the original XXX platform was used as starting point for the design of the JSX series.

=== Radial Pro Series of drum kits ===
The Radial Pro Series were Peavey's high end drum line. In production from 1994 until 2002, it consisted of the RBS-1 prototypes, radial pro 1000, 750/751, and 500/501 models. The flagship 1000 model consisted of a radial bridge that took all the mounting stresses, and a 3-ply thin maple shell to enhance the resonance. The 750/751 series had composite bridges and stained 4-ply thin maple shells. The 500/501 series had composite bridges and wrapped 5-ply North American thin hickory === Drum Innovation === Peavey drums of the 1990s were based on patented technology invented by Steven W. Volpp, including U.S. Patent No. 5,353,674 (1994), titled "Shell Resonant Membranophone," assigned to Peavey Electronics.

This design introduced the Radial Bridge system, in which the drum head is mounted to a rigid annular bridge rather than directly to the shell, allowing increased shell resonance, projection, and tonal response.

Volpp, who served as Drum Product Manager at Peavey Electronics, is the named inventor on this design.

Cite: Google Patents page for US5353674

=== Triple XXX/3120 series guitar amplifiers ===
The basis for the JSX series, the XXX series provides a tonal range from what some call "glassy" cleans, to "full body" hi-gain tones using its 3 channel interface. The 3120 series came later but was the same amp as the first edition XXX. Originally, the Peavey XXX was set to become recording artist George Lynch's signature model but the deal never finalized.

=== ValveKing series guitar amplifiers ===
The ValveKing included the Royal 8, Micro Head, VK20 Combo, 112 Combo, 212 Combo, 100 Head and matching speaker cabinets. The first generation ValveKing's were available approximately 2005–2013, then there was a second generation with a different look and some new features which eventually was discontinued around 2018.

=== Vypyr series guitar amplifiers ===
The Vypyr series of amps are modeling amplifiers. They generate different amplifier sounds based on digital models of various popular amplifiers. The models include Fender twin and deluxe, Mesa/Boogie Rectifier, Diezel Boutique, Krank Krankenstein, Vox AC30—and a large collection of Peavey amps like the 6505, XXX, and JSX. In addition to these amp models, these amps feature 11 editable pre-amp effects (All But Vypyr 15), 11 editable rack effects, on-board looper (Vypyr 30, 60, 75, 100, 120), MIDI input (Vypyr 30, 60, 75, 100, 120), and USB 2.0 connectivity (Vypyr 60, 75, 100, 120). The battery powered "Nano Vypyr" was introduced in 2012 as a competitor against other small portable modeling amps like the Roland Micro Cube and Fender Mini-Mustang. The Vypyr 60 and Vypyr 120 amps as well as the Vypyr 120 head feature 12AX7 and 6L6GC tubes. In 2013, an enhanced line of Vypyr amps was released. Called the "Vypyr VIP" series (short for "variable instrument input"), the VIP 1, VIP 2, and VIP 3 retain all the programmed models of the original Vypyrs, but also possess the ability to serve as acoustic guitar amps, as well as bass guitar amps. They are also programmable by way of computer software link.

=== TNT series bass amplifiers ===
The TNT Series bass amplifier first entered the market in the late 1970s as a 45-watt combo with one 15-inch speaker. The high-power TNT bass amplifier series was introduced as a 150–200 watt bass combo primarily equipped with a Scorpion or Black Widow 15-inch woofer. The TNT series was recently updated to 600 watts, under the title Peavey Tour TNT 115. It is currently the most powerful bass combo sold by Peavey.

=== 400BH Series Bass Amplifiers ===
The 400 BH power amp module was used in a range of bass amps during the early 1980s, commencing with the MKIII Bass Head in 1979.

The MKIV Bass Amp head unit, introduced in 1981, offers a range of functions. It is air cooled, features protection circuitry, and is capable of around 300/350 watts RMS safely into 2 ohms. The 2 ohm load rating is very stable (this amp actually operates at less than 2 ohms), enabling the use of multiple mix and match speaker systems to improve acoustic efficiency and sound stage options. In contrast, typical modern musical instrument amps are usually limited to 4 ohms speaker systems. Circuit board layout is conservative, easy to access, repair or modify. Dynamics and reliability are excellent. Its only weak point is that the preamp and power amp modules are installed in the chipboard cabinet with lack of electromagnetic shielding, resulting in a need to physically separate the amp head from bass pickups and speakers.

=== Windsor series guitar amplifiers ===
Introduced as a low-cost clone of the vaunted Marshall JCM800 2203 Master Volume. The internal design is essentially identical to the vintage Marshall, with the exception of using a plate-fed tone stack instead of the Marshall-trademarked cathode-follower-based circuitry.

=== Wolfgang and HP2 series electric guitars ===
These were a result of a collaboration with Eddie Van Halen to produce his "ideal" guitar. The design was relatively successful, but did not gain the reputation or popularity of similarly priced guitars such as the Fender Stratocaster or the Gibson Les Paul. The Peavey Wolfgang was discontinued in 2004. Peavey re-introduced the Wolfgang as the HP2 during the 2017 Summer NAMM Show.

The VT series was also popular in the late 1970s to early 1980s. Gary Rossington from Lynyrd Skynyrd played the Mace-VT. There was the Deuce-VT, the Mace's little brother, and a Classic VT. The Mace and Deuce were the same amp but the Mace had six 6l6gc output tubes and the other only 4. Hence the Mace was 160 watts and the Deuce 120 watts

== Controversy ==
In February 2015, the company was featured on an episode of the CBS television show Undercover Boss. Chief Operating Officer Courtland Gray made visits to a company store and manufacturing plant in disguise, with the founder communicating to him through a hidden earpiece. Before the episode aired, the creator of Undercover Boss issued an unprecedented statement indicating something "unfortunate happened after filming". Peavey Electronics, citing global competitive pressures, partially closed down the same plant featured in the episode. The employees at the manufacturing plant featured in the episode felt betrayed by the move. The company said these moves were necessary to remain competitive against rivals who were already manufacturing in lower-cost locations.

== Legal cases ==
In 2009, Peavey Electronics Corp. filed two lawsuits against various companies under the Behringer/Music Group umbrella for patent infringement, federal and common law trademark infringement, false designation of origin, trademark dilution, and unfair competition.

In 2011, Music Group filed suit in the US District Court against Peavey Electronics Corporation for "false advertising, false patent marking and unfair competition". In making these allegations, the Music Group cited an ongoing investigation of its own initiation that assessed Peavey products with regard to US patent laws and FCC regulations.

In April 2014, Peavey Electronics Corporation was fined US$225,000 (roughly $306,000 in 2025) by the FCC for violating digital device laws by not including required labeling and marketing statements in their owner's manuals.

On December 10, 2020, Christian Sanchez filed a complaint in New York Federal court against Peavey Electronics Corporation. Plaintiff Christian Sanchez alleges that their website is not accessible per the WCAG 2.0, WCAG 2.1 accessibility standard(s).
