= TYM Guitars =

Australian guitar manufacturer

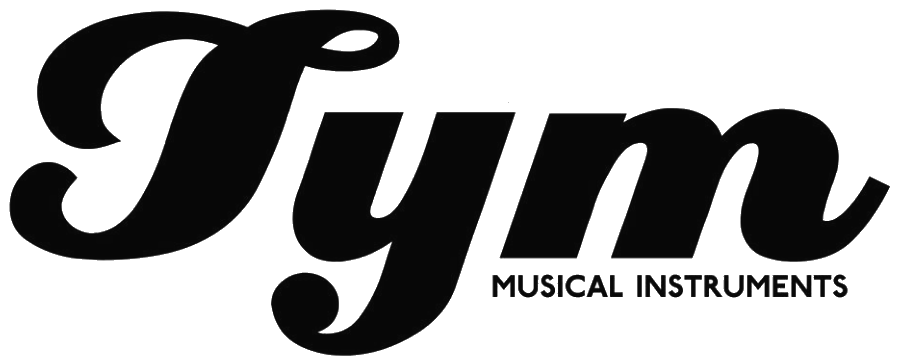
- Company type: Private
- Industry: Musical instruments
- Founded: 1997; 29 years ago
- Headquarters: Brisbane, Australia
- Area served: Global
- Website: tymguitars.com.au

TYM Guitars is a manufacturer of custom guitars and bass guitar based in Brisbane, Australia. In addition to custom instruments the company also repairs, restores, and refinishes vintage instruments. The line of custom guitars and basses built by TYM Guitars are influenced by manufacturers such as Mosrite, Rickenbacker, Epiphone, Danelectro, Fender and other models from the 1950s and 1960s, with several replicas and hybrids between different models being built to fit customer demand. TYM Guitars also has a retail shop that sells new and secondhand instruments and accessories from their own line of products and other manufacturers.

== Guitars and basses ==
The Wosrites Series

The Wosrite is based on the design of the famous Mosrite Ventures model from the 1960s and features a German carved basswood body and angled neck pickup much like the original. The series includes ten different models (not counting signature models) of guitars and basses with many different setups with different pickups, bridges, finishes etc. to choose from.

The Vibratone Series

Design based on a flipped Jagstang body, available with a wide range of options such as with or without the German carved basswood body, different pickups, bridges, tremeloes, finishes and even Perspex bodies with aluminum necks. Also available as the Versonic a Mosriteshaped acoustic guitar.

The Mosrongs Series

Another Mosrite influenced instrument designed by TYM Guitars. As with other models this is also available with different setups regarding, pickups, bridges, tremeloes, finishes etc. Also available as a semiacoustic model.

== Signature models ==
Nick Royale Model

Designed with Nick Royale from The Hellacopters and built in a limited run. Based on a mahogany Versatone body with a maple neck, a single humbucker in the bridge position. All guitars come with a certificate and a signature on the back of the headstock from Nick himself.

Johnny Ramone Model

A guitar based on Johnny Ramone of The Ramones own arsenal of guitars. Based on a Wosrite body and available in four different models with different setups of pickups, bridges and tuners based on Johnny Ramones's own guitar collection.

== Effect pedals ==
This Machine Kills Fascists

Handmade distortion and fuzz pedals based on the MXR Distortion + and the classic 1960s two knob fuzz, part of the name of the pedals are borrowed from folk musician Woody Guthrie and part of the profit is donated to charity work.

The Overdrive

A handmade medium to high gain overdrive pedal with adjustable volume and gain.

The Distortion

Handmade pedal based on several vintage distortion pedals with improved circuitry, full bypass switching and a wide range of sounds available.

The Fuzz

A classic fuzz based on several fuzz pedals made in the 1960s with more modern day attributes like LED and 9V power adapters.

The BUZZrite

Another product inspired by Mosrite, the BUZZrite is a close copy of the late 1960s Fuzzrite pedal also available with more moder applications just like The Fuzz.

The Shen-ei dlx Fuzz

Also a replica of a vintage pedal by Shen-ei fuzz which also was the original Univox Superfuzz available as an exact replica or with more modern applications.

== See also ==
- List of acoustic guitar brands
- List of electric guitar brands
