= Babicz Guitars =

American musical instrument manufacturer

Babicz Guitars USA
- Company type: Corporation
- Industry: Musical instruments
- Founded: 2003; 23 years ago in Poughkeepsie, NY
- Founder: Jeff Babicz and Jeff Carano
- Headquarters: Poughkeepsie, NY, United States
- Area served: America, Europe and Asia
- Key people: Jeff Babicz (CEO)
- Products: Acoustic guitars; Instrument hardware
- Divisions: Full Contact Hardware
- Website: babiczguitars.com

Babicz Guitars (pronounced BAB-bits) is an American manufacturer of acoustic guitars and full contact hardware, as well as a producer of licensable guitar technology. The Babicz Guitars offices are in Poughkeepsie, New York.

== History ==
Babicz Guitars was established in late 2003 by Jeff Carano and Jeff Babicz. As the executive management team for the headless Steinberger Guitar Company in the 1980s and early 1990s.

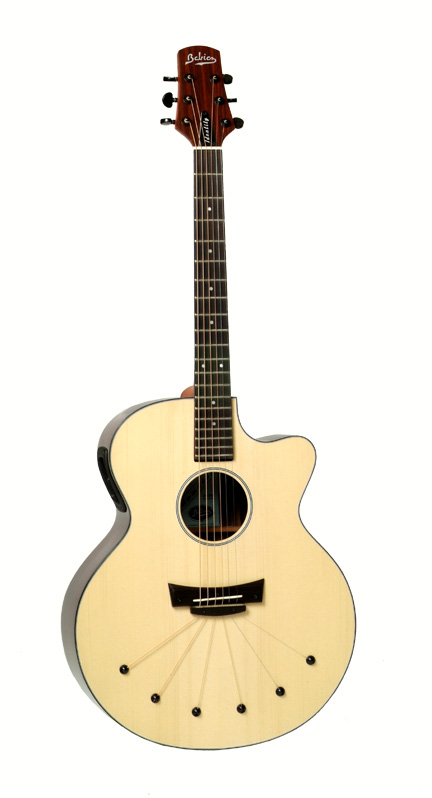
Babicz Identity Jumbo Rosewood
