= List of signature model guitars =

The popularity of the electric guitar and the acoustic guitar in music from the mid-20th century has led to various instrument manufacturers producing signature models that are endorsed by an artist.

== A ==
Artist	Model	Company	Production lifetime	Notes	Ref.
Abbath	RavenDark V FR Abbath Signature	Schecter			
Adam Dutkiewicz	TAT Special FX "Metal Machine"	Caparison			
Adam Jones	1979V2 Les Paul Custom	Gibson Custom Shop	2021-	Limited edition of 79 instruments	
Al Di Meola	Prism	PRS Guitars			
Al Jourgensen	Signature Triton : 277	Schecter			
Alan Ashby	AA-1	ESP	2022		
Albert Hammond Jr.	Albert Hammond Jr Stratocaster	Fender	2018-present	Changed function of the five-way selector: position 4 combines output from the bridge and neck pick-ups; other positions changed accordingly.	
Albert Lee	Albert Lee	Music Man		Available in polar night, Firemist silver, pink burst or vintage tobacco	
Albert Lee	Albert Lee HH	Music Man		Available in polar night, emerald city or fiesta red; Sterling branded version in trans walnut or black	
Albert Lee	Albert Lee P90	Sterling by Music Man	2023-	Available in sherwood green or vintage cream	
Alex De Grassi	Alex De Grassi Signature	Lowden			
Alex Lifeson	Alex Lifeson Les Paul Axcess Standard	Epiphone	2011–present		
Alex Lifeson	Alex Lifeson Les Paul Custom Axcess	Epiphone	2023	Ruby in colour that also comes in a left-handed version	
Alex Lifeson	Lerxst Limelight	Godin	2024		
Alex Lifeson	SE Alex Lifeson Thinline Acoustic	PRS			
Alex Skolnick	Alex Skolnick	ESP		Lemon burst	
Alex Skolnick	Alex Skolnick FR	ESP		Black aqua sunburst	
Alex Skolnick	AS-1	ESP		Lemon burst	
Alex Skolnick	AS-1FR	ESP		Black aqua sunburst	
Alex Wade	AW-7 Baritone	ESP		Open grain black satin	
Alexi Belov	Gorky Park	Kramer	1989	Shaped in the style of a balalaika	
Alexi Laiho	Alexi-200	ESP			
Alexi Laiho	E-II Alexi Ripped	ESP		Purple fade satin with ripped pinstripes	
Alexi Laiho	ESP Alexi Hexed	ESP		Purple fade satin with pinstripes	
Alexi Laiho	ESP Alexi Ripped	ESP		Purple fade satin with ripped pinstripes	
Alexi Laiho	LTD Alexi Hexed	ESP		Purple fade with pinstripes	
Alexi Laiho	LTD Alexi Hexed LH	ESP		Purple fade with pinstripes	
Alexi Laiho	LTD Alexi Ripped	ESP		Purple fade satin with ripped pinstripes	
Alexi Laiho	LTD Alexi Ripped LH	ESP		Purple fade satin with ripped pinstripes	
Andy McKee	Andy McKee Signature	Greenfield			
Andy McKee	Rylynn	Greenfield			
Andy Timmons	ATZ100	Ibanez	2022		
Andy Timmons	AT10RP	Ibanez	2015		
Andy Timmons	AT10P; ATZ10P; AT100CL; ATZ100CL; AT200AV; AT300AV	Ibanez			
Angel Vivaldi	Pro-Mod DK24-6 Nova	Charvel			
Angel Vivaldi	Pro-Mod DK24-7 Nova	Charvel			
Angus Young	Angus Young SG	Gibson		Tune o Matic and Vibrola vibrato versions produced.	

== B ==
Artist	Model	Company	Production lifetime	Notes	Ref.
B. B. King	B. B. King Lucille	Gibson and Epiphone	1980–present	Available in bone white, cherry, and ebony	
B. B. King	Little Lucille	Gibson	1999-? (discontinued)	Based on the Gibson Blueshawk, but with Tune-o-matic and TP-6 stop tailpiece	
B. B. King	80th Birthday Lucille	Gibson	2005	Limited run of 80 on the occasion of King's 80th birthday; the copy gifted to King was stolen in 2009 and recovered several months later	
B. B. King	B.B. King "Lucille" ES	Gibson	2018-	Alpine white, TP-6 Fine Tune Tailpiece	
Balsac	BalSac E-1 FR	Schecter			
Ben Burnley	BB-600 Baritone	ESP			
Ben Weinman	BW-1 Evertune	ESP			
Bill Kelliher	BK-600	ESP			
Bill Kelliher	Eclipse	ESP			
Bill Kelliher	Sparrowhawk	ESP			
Billie Joe Armstrong	Billie Joe Armstrong Les Paul Junior	Gibson	2018		
Billie Joe Armstrong	Billie Joe Armstrong ES-137	Gibson	2016		
Billy Corgan	Stratocaster	Fender	2008-2012		
Bob Weir	Deluxe Bob Weir Bedford	D'Angelico			
Bob Weir	Premier Bob Weir Bedford	D'Angelico			
Bonnie Raitt	Bonnie Raitt Stratocaster	Fender	1995-2001	First signature model for a female artist.	
Brandon Niederauer	Deluxe Brandon Niederauer Atlantic	D'Angelico		Limited run	
Brian May	Brian May	Guild	1984-1988	Came in amber finish, black finish, blue finish, green finish, red finish, and white finish	
Brian May	Brian May Pro	Guild	1994-1995		
Brian May	Brian May Signature	Guild	1994	Came in black finish, green finish, red finish, and white finish	
Brian May	Brian May Special	Guild	1994-1995		
Brian May	Brian May Standard	Guild	1994-1995	Came in black finish, green finish, red finish, and white finish	
Brian Setzer	G6120T-BSSMK Brian Setzer Signature 59 Bigsby	Gretsch			
Brian Welch	SH-207	ESP			
Brian Welch	SH-7 Evertune	ESP			
Bruno Mars	Limited Edition Bruno Mars Stratocaster	Fender	2023		
Buz McGrath	Buz-7	ESP		Comes in Mars Mocha Heirloom	

== C ==
Artist	Model	Company	Production lifetime	Notes	Ref.
Carlos Santana	PRS Santana Signature	PRS			
Cesar Soto	Cesar Soto E-1	Schecter		Available in a left-handed model	
Charlie Para	Charlie Parra Signature Vanguard	Kramer			
Chet Atkins	Gretsch model 6120 Chet Atkins Hollow Body	Gretsch			
Chris Howorth	Chris Howorth V-7	Schecter			
Chris Shiflett	Chris Shiflett Custom Shop Telecaster	Fender			
Chris Shiflett	Chris Shiflett Telecaster Deluxe	Fender			
Christian Andreu	USA Signature Christian Andreu Rhoads RR	Jackson	2016-2025		
Christian Andreu	Pro Series Signature Christian Andreu Rhoads RRT	Jackson	2021-2026		
Christian Andreu	Pro Plus Series Signature Christian Andreu Rhoads RR24 EVTN6	Jackson	2026-present		
Chuck Loeb	Chuck Loeb Signature	Sadowsky			
Cory Churko	Rebel	Prestige			
Courtney Cox	Horus-M3 CC	Caparison			
Cory Wong	Cory Wong Limited Edition	Fender	2023	Comes in daphne blue and surf green.	
Cory Wong	Cory Wong Signature	Fender	2021–present		

== D ==
Artist	Model	Company	Production lifetime	Notes	Ref.
Dan Donegan	Dan Donegan Ultra	Schecter			
Daniela Villarreal	Astryx Limited Edition	PRS			
Daryl Stuermer	Signature DS-1	Godin			
Dave Davidson	Jackson Pro Series Signature Dave Davidson Warrior WR7	Jackson			
Dave Grohl	Dave Grohl DG-335	Epiphone	2024	Limited edition	
Dave Grohl	DG-335	Gibson	2007–present		
Dave Murray	Dave Murray Stratocaster	Fender	2009-2014	HSH pick-up configuration	
Dave Murray	Dave Murray California Series Stratocaster	Fender	2015-	"California" model made in Mexico; HHH pick-up configuration	
Dave Sabo	Snake Sabo Baretta	Kramer			
David Gilmour	D-35	Martin		250 produced in six and 12-string. Available in sunburst and ambertone finish.	
David Gilmour	David Gilmour Signature Series Stratocaster	Fender Custom Shop	2008-2019	Based on The Black Strat	
David Grissom	Dave Grissom Trem (DGT)	PRS			
Derry Grehan	Derry Grehan Signature Tread 1	Godin			
Dick Dale	Dick Dale Signature Stratocaster	Fender	1994-	Three-way selector and separate switch that engages neck and middle pickups; early models have a special oval neck profile	
DJ Ashba	DJ Ashba	Schecter		Available in carbon grey and satin white	
DJ Ashba	DJ Ashba Acoustic	Schecter		Available in carbon grey and satin white	
DJ Ashba	DJ Ashba USA Signature	Schecter			
Doyle Wolfgang von Frankenstein	USA Doyle Signature Annihilator	Dean			
Dustie Waring	DW CE 24 "Floyd"	PRS	2022	Available in black top, burnt amber smokeburst, faded blue smokeburst, gray black, and Waring burst	

== E ==
Artist	Model	Company	Production lifetime	Notes	Ref.
Ed O'Brien	EOB Sustainer Stratocaster	Fender	2017—present	Features a sustainer unit	
Ed Sheeran	Sheeran Equals Edition	Lowden		3000 produced	
Ed Sheeran	Sheeran Tour Edition	Lowden			
Elliot Easton	Elliot Easton Pro 1	Kramer	1987		
Emily Wolfe	Sheraton Stealth	Epiphone	2021		
Emily Wolfe	"White Wolfe" Sheraton	Epiphone	2023		
Eric Clapton	Eric Clapton Stratocaster	Fender	1988–present	The first signature model produced by Fender	
Eric Johnson	Eric Johnson Stratocaster	Fender	2005–present		
Eric Johnson	Eric Johnson Stratocaster Thinline	Fender	2018-?	First semi-hollow stratocaster with classic body shape	
Eric Johnson	Eric Johnson 1974 "Virginia" Stratocaster	Fender Custom Shop (limited edition of 50) and Fender (regular production model)	2020-2021 (limited); 2020-present (regular model)		

== F ==
Artist	Model	Company	Production lifetime	Notes	Ref.
Frank Gambale	LUXE II	Cort			
Frank Gambale	LUXE Nylon	Cort			
Frank Iero	Wilshire Phant-O-Matic	Epiphone	2011-2019	It was available in Antique Ivory and Emerald Green	
Frank Iero	Epiphone "Pansy" Les Paul Elitist	Epiphone			
Frank Vignola	Frank Vignola	Sadowsky			
Frank Vignola	FV680CE	Eastman			
Frank Vignola	FV880CE	Eastman			

== G ==
Artist	Model	Company	Production lifetime	Notes	Ref.
Garth Brooks	GB7C Garth Brooks Signature	Takamine			
Gary Clark Jr.	Gary Clark Jr. "Blak & Blu" Casino	Epiphone		Bigsby vibrato and trapeze tailpiece versions produced.	
Gary Moore	Gary Moore Les Paul Standard	Gibson	2013-		
Gary Holt	EC	ESP			
Gary Holt	GH 200	ESP			
Gary Holt	GH 600	ESP		Comes in black and snow white	
George Benson	GB series semi-acoustics	Ibanez			
George Benson	LGB30 George Benson Signature	Ibanez	2012	More affordable model	
George Benson	George Benson GBSP10	Ibanez	2022		
George Lynch	GL-200MT	ESP			
George Lynch	Kamikaze-1	ESP			
George Lynch	Kamikaze-4	ESP			
George Lynch	Skulls & Snakes	ESP			
George Lynch	Sunburst Tiger	ESP			
Glenn Frey	EF360GF Glenn Frey Signature	Takamine			
Glenn Tipton	GT-600	ESP			
Guthrie Govan	MJ San Dimas SD24 CM	Charvel			
Guthrie Govan	USA Signature HSH	Charvel		Available in caramelized ash and flame maple	

== H ==
Artist	Model	Company	Production lifetime	Notes	Ref.
Henrik Danhage	Limited Edition Signature Pro Mod So-Cal Style 1 HS FR M	Charvel			
Hiram Bullock	HBS	Cort			
Howard Roberts	Epiphone Howard Roberts	Epiphone	1965		

== I ==
Artist	Model	Company	Production lifetime	Notes	Ref.
Ian Thornley	Ian Thornley Signature	Suhr		A JM-type model	
Ian Thornley	Ian Thornley Classic S Antique	Suhr		"Roughneck" variant has a heavy "relic" finish, "sonic white" is much more lightly relicked.	
Ian Thornley	Ian Thornley Classic T	Suhr		Mahogany body with natural finish - nicknamed "The Lumberjack"	

== J ==
Artist	Model	Company	Production lifetime	Notes	Ref.
J Mascis	Jazzmaster	Squier	2011-		
J Mascis	Telecaster	Fender	2021-	Top-loader bridge for reduced string tension	
Jack Fowler	Jack Fowler Traditional	Shecter			
Jack Fowler	Jack Fowler Traditional HT	Shecter			
Jake E. Lee	Pro Mod So-Cal Style 1 HSS HT RW	Charvel			
Jake E. Lee	USA Signature	Charvel			
Jake Pitts	Jake Pitts E-1 FR S	Schecter			
James Hetfield	ESP Iron Cross	ESP	2016–present		
James Hetfield	ESP Snakebyte	ESP		Comes in black satin and camo	
James Hetfield	ESP Vulture	ESP	2016–present		
James Hetfield	LTD Iron Cross	ESP		Available in a left-handed model	
James Hetfield	LTD Snakebyte	ESP	2011–present	Available in black satin, camo, and snow white. Also available in a left-handed model in black satin and snow white.	
James Hetfield	LTD Vulture	ESP		Available in a left-handed model	
James Valentine	Valentine	Music Man			
Jared Dines	Jared Dines StingRay Artist Series	Music Man	2020		
Jared James Nichols	"Gold Glory" Les Paul Custom	Epiphone			
Jason Becker	Jason Becker Tribute JB200C	Carvin, continued into Kiesel era	2012-?		
Jason Becker	JB100 series	Kiesel	2017-		
Jason Becker	JB24	Kiesel	2018-	Superstrat with frets labelled with their numbers instead of dot inlays, hence named the "Numbers Guitar"	
Jason Becker	JB06X	Kiesel	2018-	Headless "Numbers Guitar", limited edition	
Jason Becker	Yin Yang	Kiesel	2021-		
Jason Mraz	JMSM	Taylor			
Javier Reyes	JR-208	ESP			
Javier Reyes	JR-608	ESP			
Javier Reyes	JR-7	ESP	2022		
Jeff Beck	Jeff Beck Stratocaster	Fender	1991–present		
Jeff Beck	Jeff Beck Tribute Esquire	Fender Custom Shop	2006-?	Based on Jeff Beck's 1954 Fender Esquire; limited to 150	
Jeff Beck	1954 Jeff Beck Les Paul Oxblood	Gibson Custom Shop	2009-?	Limited to 50 with replicated ageing and 100 with VOS finish	
Jeff DaRosa	Alliance Series Jeff DaRosa	Duesenberg		Alliance Series	
Jeff Hanneman	JH-600 CTM	ESP			
Jeff Ling	E-II Jeff Ling	ESP			
Jeff Ling	JL-600	ESP			
Jerry Cantrell	Rampage Jerry Cantrell Signature	G&L			
Jerry Cantrell	Tribute Series Jerry Cantrell Signature Superhawk	G&L	2014-?		
Jerry Cantrell	Les Paul Custom Prophecy	Epiphone	2022-?		
Jerry Cantrell	Wino Les Paul Custom	Epiphone	2022-?		
Jerry Donahue	V58 Ash Blonde	Vintage			
Jerry Douglas	Jerry Douglas Signature	Beard			
Jerry Douglas	Jerry Douglas Signature Blackbeard	Beard			
Jerry Douglas	Jerry Douglas Signature Limited Edition	Beard			
Jerry Garcia	Jerry Garcia Alligator Stratocaster	Fender Custom Shop	2022	Imitates an original auctioned at Bonham's for $524,075 US in 2019; limited to 100	
Jerry Horton	Tempest	Schecter			
Jim Adkins	JA-90 Telecaster Thinline	Fender	2009-Present	Comes in white, natural, and crimson red transparent with an Indian laurel fretboard	
Jim Hall	Jim Hall	Sadowsky			
Jim Root	Jazzmaster	Fender			
Jim Root	Jazzmaster V4	Fender			
Jim Root	Pro-Mod San Dimas Style 1 HH FR E	Charvel	2022		
Jim Root	Pro-Mod San Dimas Style 1 HH FR M	Charvel	2022		
Jim Root	Jim Root Stratocaster	Fender			
Jim Root	Jim Root Telecaster	Fender	2007–present		
Jimmy Bruno	Jimmy Bruno	Sadowsky	2011		
Jimmy Page	"Number Two" Les Paul	Gibson	2013		
Joan Jett	Olympic Special	Epiphone			
Joe Bonamassa	"Lazarus" 1959 Les Paul Standard	Epiphone			
Joe Beck	Beck-6	Cort	1999		
Joe Beck	Beck-Alto	Cort	1999-2002		
Joe Duplantier	Pro-Mod San Dimas Style 2 HH	Charvel			
Joe Duplantier	Pro-Mod San Dimas Style 2 HH E	Charvel			
Joe Duplantier	LTD JD-1	ESP/LTD	2026 - present		
Joe Maphis	Mosrite Joe Maphis	Mosrite			
Joe Satriani	JA5	Ibanez			
Joe Satriani	JA20	Ibanez			
Joe Satriani	JS1CR	Ibanez			
Joe Satriani	JS2GD	Ibanez			
Joe Satriani	JS140M	Ibanez			
Joe Satriani	JS240PS	Ibanez			
Joe Satriani	JS2410	Ibanez			
Joe Satriani	JS2450	Ibanez			
Joe Strummer	Campfire Acoustic	Fender			
Joe Trohman	Joe Trohman Telecaster	Squier	2011-	Three pick-ups in HSH configuration	
Joe Walsh	Alliance Series Joe Walsh	Duesenberg		Alliance Series. Available in gold burst and black	
Joel Stroetzel	Dellinger-JSM	Caparison			
John 5	Ghost Telecaster	Fender	2023	Red-bound alder body and one-piece maple neck	
John Frusciante	Limited Edition Masterbuilt John Frusciante Stratocaster	Fender Custom Shop	2024-		
John Jorgenson	JJ325SRC John Jorgenson	Takamine		12-string version also produced	
John Joyce	John Joyce Signature	Aria Pro II		Acoustic guitar	
John Lennon	Inspired by John Lennon Casino	Epiphone	2009–present		
John Mayer	John Mayer Stratocaster	Fender	2005-2014		
John Mayer	Limited Edition John Mayer Black1 Stratocaster	Fender Custom Shop	2010		
John Mayer	Silver Sky	PRS	2018–		
John Mayer	SE Silver Sky	PRS	2022-		
John McLaughlin	Private Stock John McLaughlin	PRS	2023-?	Limited to 200 worldwide	
John Petrucci	John Petrucci 20th Anniversary	Music Man	2021	Available in 7-string	
John Petrucci	John Petrucci BFR	Music Man		Available in 7-string. Comes in various colours for both	
John Petrucci	JP12	Music Man			
John Petrucci	JP15	Music Man		Available in 7-string. Comes in tiger eye flame top, purple nebula flame top, tiger eye quilt top, flame trans black burst, Sahara burst quilt, Sahara burst flame, cerulean paradise flame for both.	
John Petrucci	JP16	Music Man			
John Petrucci	Majesty	Music Man		Available in 7 and 8-string. Comes in okelani blue, emerald sky, wisteria blossom, and sanguine red.	
John Petrucci	Majesty 20th Anniversary	Music Man	2021	Available in 7-string	
John Petrucci	Majesty Maple Top	Music Man		Available in 7 and 8-string. Comes in crystal amethyst and spice melange for all three.	
John Petrucci	Monarchy Majesty	Music Man			
John Pisano	AR380CE	Eastman			
John Pisano	AR480CE	Eastman		30th Anniversary Edition	
John Pisano	AR680CE	Eastman			
John Pisano	AR880CE	Eastman			
John Verity	V6JV	JHS/FretKing	2012–present	Comes in blue and candy apple red.	
Johnny A.	Johnny A. Custom Outfit	Gibson and Epiphone			
Johnny Depp	Alliance Series Johnny Depp	Duesenberg		Alliance Series	
Johnny Marr	Johnny Marr Jaguar	Fender			
Jon Gomm	JGM5	Ibanez			
Jon Gomm	JGM10	Ibanez			
Josh Middleton	JM-II	ESP			
Josh White	Ovation Josh White	Ovation	1966		
Julian Lage	470 JL	Collings			

== K ==
Artist	Model	Company	Production lifetime	Notes	Ref.
Karl Sanders	Karl Sanders V Floyd Gate of Sethu	Dean	2020		
Keith Merrow	KM-6 MK-III Artist	Schecter		Available in blue crimson and trans black burst. Available in a left-handed model in blue crimson.	
Keith Merrow	KM-6 Mk-III Hybrid	Schecter		Available in snow blind and telesto grey. Available in a left-handed model in snow blind.	
Keith Merrow	KM-6 MK-III Standard	Schecter		Available in a left-handed model	
Keith Merrow	KM-7 MK-III Artist	Schecter		Available in blue crimson and trans black burst. Available in a left-handed version that comes in blue crimson.	
Keith Merrow	KM-7 Mk-III Hybrid	Schecter		Available in snowblind and telesto grey. Available in a left-handed model in snowblind.	
Keith Merrow	KM-7 MK-III Pro USA Signature	Schecter		Available in blue crimson pearl and trans black pearl	
Keith Merrow	KM-7 MK-III Stage USA Signature	Schecter		Available in snowblind white satin pearl and stealth grey satin	
Keith Merrow	KM-7 MK-III Standard LH	Schecter			
Keith Merrow	KM-7 MK-III Studio USA Signature	Schecter		Comes in blue crimson pearl and trans black pearl	
Ken Susi	KS M-6 Evertune	ESP			
Ken Susi	KS M-7 Evertune	ESP			
Kenny Chesney	KC70 Kenny Chesney Signature	Takamine			
Kenny Hickey	Kenny Hickey C-1 EX S	Schecter		Available in a left-handed model	
Kenny Hickey	Kenny Hickey Solo-6 EX S	Schecter			
Kenny Wayne Shepherd	Stratocaster	Fender	2008-2015	First series, made in Mexico	
Kenny Wayne Shepherd	Stratocaster	Fender	2020-	Second series, made in USA	
Kerry King	Kerry King V Black Satin	Dean			
Kerry King	USA Kerry King V Limited Edition	Dean	2020	50 produced	
Kirk Hammett	ESP 30th Anniversary KH-3 Spider	ESP			
Kirk Hammett	ESP KH Demonology	ESP			
Kirk Hammett	KH-2	ESP			
Kirk Hammett	KH-2 Neck Thru Body	ESP			
Kirk Hammett	KH-2 Vintage	ESP			
Kirk Hammett	KH-202	ESP		Available in a left-handed model	
Kirk Hammett	KH-602	ESP		Available in a left-handed model	
Kirk Hammett	KH-WZ	ESP			
Kirk Hammett	LTD 30th Anniversary KH-3 Spider	ESP		Available in a left-handed model	
Kirk Hammett	LTD KH Demonology	ESP			
Kirk Hammett	KH "Greeny" Les Paul	Gibson	2023–Present		
Kurt Cobain	Jag-Stang	Fender	1996 - 2004		
Kurt Cobain	Kurt Cobain Jaguar	Fender	2011–Present	Available in three color sunburst	
Kurt Cobain	Kurt Cobain Mustang	Fender	2012 - 2014	Was available in sonic blue, fiesta red and lake placid blue	

== L ==
Artist	Model	Company	Production lifetime	Notes	Ref.
Lari Basilio	LB1	Ibanez	2021	Violet color with Seymour Duncan® Lari Basilio S-S-H pickups	
Larry Coryell	LCS-1	Cort			
Larry Coryell	LC2-2	Cort	2001		
Lars Frederiksen	Volsung	ESP			
Lee Malia	Explorer Custom Artisan	Epiphone			
Lee Malia	Les Paul Custom Artisan	Epiphone			
Lee Malia	RD Custom Artisan	Epiphone			
Lee Ranaldo	Lee Ranaldo Signature Jazzmaster	Fender	2009-2014		
Leslie West	USA Leslie West Tattered N Torn TBZ	Dean		50 produced	
Luke Kilpatrick	E-II Luke Kilpatrick	ESP			
Luke Kilpatrick	LK-600	ESP			
Lincoln Brewster	Lincoln Brewster Stratocastor	Fender	2024		
Lzzy Hale	Lzzy Hale Signature Explorerbird	Gibson			

== M ==
Artist	Model	Company	Production lifetime	Notes	Ref.
Machine Gun Kelly	PT	Shecter		Available in a left-handed model	
Malcolm Young	G6131-MY Malcolm Young Signature	Gretsch			
Marco Sfogli	Pro-Mod So-Cal Style 1 HSS FR CM QM	Charvel	2022		
Mark Holcomb	SE Mark Holcomb	PRS	2013–present	7 and 8 strings models available	
Mark Holcomb	SE Mark Holcomb SVN	PRS			
Mark Lettieri	Fiore	PRS			
Mark Tremonti	Mark Tremonti Signature	PRS			
Mark Tremonti	SE Mark Tremonti	PRS			
Mark Tremonti	SE Mark Tremonti Standard	PRS	2020–present		
Martin Miller	MM1	Ibanez	2018-		
Martin Miller	MM7	Ibanez	2021-		
Martin Miller	MMN1	Ibanez	2023-		
Masayoshi Takanaka	SG T	Yamaha	1998	Seethrough navy blue colour with gold letters spelling out "TAKANAKA" within the body, three gold palm trees on the body, and one on the headstock.	
Masayoshi Takanaka	SG T2	Yamaha	1998	Seethrough red colour, same decals as SG T	
Masayoshi Takanaka	SG-2000MT	Yamaha	1998	Takanaka signature lagoon blue colouration	
Mark Gemini Thwaite	Mark Thwaite Solo-II	Schecter			
Mateus Asato	Mateus Asato Signature	Suhr	2018	An S-style guitar based on the Suhr Classic Antique; in product listings, it is often called the "Suhr Mateus Asato Signature Classic S".	
Mateus Asato	Signature Classic T	Suhr	2020		
Mateus Asato	Signature Classic T II	Suhr	2023	Two models: The SIG-0045 is a hardtail with Asato's Signature M.A.T. pickups and Suhr’s silent single coil system, while the higher-priced SIG-0046 has a Gotoh 510 tremolo system and Lollar gold-foil pickups.	
Matt Bellamy	Cort MBC-1 Matthew Bellamy Signature	Cort	2015–present		
Matt Bellamy	MB-1	Manson			
Matt Heafy	Les Paul Custom Nightfall	Epiphone		7-string model also available	
Matt Heafy	Les Paul Custom Origins	Epiphone		Available in bone white and ebony. Also available in 7-string.	
Matt Heafy	Les Paul Custom Snofall	Epiphone		7-string model also available	
Matt "Guitar" Murphy	MGM-1	Cort			
Mattias Eklundh	Apple Horn 8 EF	Caparison			
Max Cavalera	Max-200 RPR	ESP			
Max Cavalera	Max Cavalera RPR	ESP			
Michael Amott	USA Tyrant Burgundy/White	Dean	2019		
Michael Amott	Tyrant Tin Man	Dean	2019		
Michael Amott	Tyrant X Splatter	Dean	2019		
Michael Angelo Batio	ES Hybrid Series	Sawtooth		Floyd Rose tremolo. Available in left-handed model. Comes in natural flame maple or blood red sparkle.	
Michael Angelo Batio	ES Hybrid Wilkinson	Sawtooth		Wilkinson tremolo. Available in left-handed model. Comes in natural flame maple and blood red sparkle.	
Michael Angelo Batio	ET Hybrid Series	Sawtooth		Floyd Rose tremolo. Available in left-handed model. Comes in splatted maple trans cherry burst and grass stained blue jean	
Michael Angelo Batio	ET Hybrid Series Wilkinson	Sawtooth		Wilkinson tremolo. Available in left-handed model. Comes in splatted maple trans cherry burst and flame maple blue jean	
Michael Angelo Batio	Heritage 24 Fret FRX	Sawtooth			
Michael Angelo Batio	Heritage HM724 7-String	Sawtooth			
Michael Angelo Batio	Limited Edition Double-Guitar	Sawtooth	2021	50 available worldwide	
Michael Angelo Batio	ST-M24	Sawtooth		Available in satin black with a Wilkinson hardtail bridge. Also available in satin white with a Floyd Rose tremolo	
Michael Romeo	Dellinger Prominence MJR	Caparison			
Michael Schenker	Retro Red Black	Dean Guitars	2016-		
Midge Ure	V100 Gold Top	Vintage			
Mike Auldridge	Mike Auldridge Signature	Beard			
Mike Campbell	Alliance Series	Duesenberg		Alliance Series. Available in metallic light blue, metallic green, and metallic red.	
Mike McCready	Mike McCready Stratocaster	Fender	2023-present		
Mike Mushok	MMM1	Ibanez	Discontinued		
Mike Schleibaum	MSV-1	ESP			
Miles Dimitri Baker	6 FR	Schecter			
Miles Dimitri Baker	SVSS LH	Schecter			
Mille Petrozza	MK-600	ESP	2018		
Myles Kennedy	PRS Myles Kennedy	PRS	2023-		

== N ==
Artist	Model	Company	Production lifetime	Notes	Ref.
Nancy Wilson	Fanatic	Epiphone			
Neil Westfall	NW-44	ESP			
Neil Zaza	NZS-1	Cort	2001		
Nergal	NS-6	ESP			
Nick Hipa	Angelus-NH	Caparison			
Nick Johnston	Signature PT	Schecter		Available in atomic frost, atomic green, atomic ink, and atomic snow	
Nick Johnston	Traditional	Schecter		Available in atomic coral, atomic frost, atomic green, atomic ink, atomic orange, and atomic snow	
Nick Johnston	Traditional H/S/S	Schecter		Available in atomic coral, atomic frost, atomic green, atomic ink, atomic orange, and atomic snow. Also available in a left-handed model. Comes in atomic green and atomic orange.	
Nick Johnston	Traditional SSS	Schecter	2023		
Nick Johnston	Traditional USA Signature	Schecter			
Nick Johnston	USA Signature	Schecter		Available in atomic green, atomic snow, and flame top nitro	
Nick Johnston	USA Signature Nitro Finisher	Schecter			
Nick Lucas	Nick Lucas	Beneteau		In collaboration with Gibson. Based on the Gibson L-100. Available in 12 and 14-fret versions.	
Nick Valensi	Riviera P94	Epiphone	2007–2011	Available as an Elitist version in 2006	
Nigel Tufnel	Nigel Tufnel Mr. Horsepower Signature Guitar	Music Man	2001	25 produced	
Nikki Stringfield	A-6 FR S	Schecter		Available in bright red burst and Maiden Mist	
Nita Strauss	JIVA, or JIVA10	Ibanez	2018	First Ibanez signature guitar bearing a female guitarist's name; standard model	
Nita Strauss	JIVAJR	Ibanez	2020	More affordable model	
Nita Strauss	JIVAX2	Ibanez	2022	Second generation of the premium model	
Noel Gallagher	J-150	Gibson			
Noel Gallagher	Riviera	Epiphone	2022	Available in left-handed	
Noel Gallagher	Supernova	Epiphone	1997–2005	Never played by Noel Gallagher, just for endorsement	
Noel Gallagher	Supernova Union Jack	Epiphone	1995	Union Jack flag on the body	

== O ==
Artist	Model	Company	Production lifetime	Notes	Ref.
Orianthi	SJ-200	Gibson			
Orianthi	Private Stock Orianthi Limited Edition	PRS	2022		

== P ==
Artist	Model	Company	Production lifetime	Notes	Ref.
Paul Brady	Paul Brady Signature	Lowden			
Paul Dean	Paul Dean Signature	Kramer	1986-1988		
Paul Gilbert	FRM100	Ibanez			
Paul Gilbert	FRM300-PR	Ibanez	2021-		
Paul Landers	Signature Les Paul	Gibson	2012-		
Paul Stanley	PS1CM	Ibanez			
Paul Stanley	PS60	Ibanez			
Paul Stanley	PS10	Ibanez			
Paul Stanley	PS120	Ibanez		Available in a left-handed model	
Paul Stanley	PSM10	Ibanez			
Paul Waggoner	PWM 20 Signature	Ibanez	2021-		
Paul Wiley	Noir	Schecter			
Pete Dee	PT	Schecter			
Pete Townshend	Limited Edition Pete Townshend Stratocaster	Fender Custom Shop	2016-2019		
Pierre Bensusan	Old Lady	Lowden			
Pierre Bensusan	Pierre Bensusan Signature	Lowden			
Prince	Symbol Purple	Schecter		Schecter Custom Works Master Shop	

== R ==
Artist	Model	Company	Production lifetime	Notes	Ref.
Randy Weitzel	V-7 FR	Schecter			
Reba Meyers	RM-600	ESP			
Richard Kruspe	E-II RZK-I Burnt	ESP			
Richard Kruspe	E-II RZK-II Burnt	ESP			
Richard Kruspe	ESP RZK-II Burnt	ESP			
Richard Thompson	Richard Thompson Signature	Lowden			
Richie Kotzen	STR-135RK	Fender	1996-2000	DiMarzio Custom pick-ups	
Richie Kotzen	STR-RK	Fender	2008-2015	DiMarzio Custom pick-ups	
Richie Kotzen	Richie Kotzen Strat	Fender	2015-	DiMarzio Custom pick-ups	
Richie Sambora	Richie Sambora Signature	Kramer	1987-1991; 2004 (re-issue)	Also known as "Jersey Star"	
Richie Sambora	Richie Sambora Stratocaster	Fender	1993-1999	Made in USA with Floyd Rose vibrato system, HSS pickup configuration and 22 frets	
Richie Sambora	Richie Sambora Stratocaster	Fender	1999-?	Made in USA; redesign with "vintage" frets, custom V shaped neck, six-point vibrato system, hot noiseless SSS pick-up configuration and 22 frets	
Richie Sambora	Richie Sambora Standard Stratocaster	Fender	1994-2002	Made in Mexico with Floyd Rose II vibrato system and 21 frets	
Richie Sambora	Richie Sambora Black Paisley Stratocaster	Fender	1996-2002	Made in Japan in four variations, three of which were only sold domestically	
Rick Beato	Rick Beato Signature Les Paul Special DC	Gibson			
Rick Graham	MJ DK24 SPT CM	Charvel			
Ritchie Blackmore	Ritchie Blackmore Signature Stratocaster	Fender Custom Shop	1998-2005		
Ritchie Blackmore	Ritchie Blackmore Stratocaster	Fender	2009-		
Ritchie Blackmore	Ritchie Blackmore 1969 Light Relic Stratocaster	Fender Custom Shop	2013-2014		
Robb Flynn	Love/Death Baritone Flying-V Signature Guitar	Epiphone	2011		
Rob Scallon	C-1 Rob Scallon	Schecter	2022	Available in a left-handed model	
Rob Scallon	C-7 Multiscale Rob Scallon	Schecter	2022	Available in a left-handed model	
Rob Scallon	C-8 Multiscale Rob Scallon	Schecter	2022	Available in a left-handed model	
Robert Smith	RS-1000 Busker Acoustic	Schecter			
Robert Smith	RS-1000 Stage Acoustic	Schecter			
Robert Smith	Signature Jazzmaster	Fender			
Robert Smith	UltraCure	Schecter			
Robert Smith	UltraCure 40th Anniversary	Schecter			
Robert Smith	UltraCure VI	Schecter			
Robert Smith	UltraCure XII	Schecter			
Robin Trower	Signature Stratocaster	Fender	2004-		
Robin Trower	Bridge of Sighs Tribute Stratocaster	Fender Custom Shop	2004-2005	Celebrates 30th anniversary of "Bridge of Sighs" album; 2014 was also the 50th anniversary of the stratocaster	
Robin Zander	Corsair	Schecter			
Ronnie Wood	ESP Ron Wood	ESP			
Ronnie Wood	LTD Ron Wood	ESP			
Rory Gallagher	Rory Gallagher Signature Stratocaster	Fender Custom Shop	2004-		

== S ==
Artist	Model	Company	Production lifetime	Notes	Ref.
Sammy Duet	SD-2	ESP	2022		
Satchel	Pro-Mod DK22 HH FR M	Charvel			
Scott Henderson	Scott Henderson Signature	Suhr		Based on the Classic S series	
Sean Long	Pro-Mod San Dimas Style 1 HH HT M	Charvel			
Sergio Vallin	Sergio Vallin Signature Model	Fender	2015-2018	New body shape, MIM	
Sin Quirin	Sin Quirin V-1	Schecter			
Slash	Firebird	Gibson and Epiphone	2015-2017		
Slash	J-45	Gibson and Epiphone	2019–present	Available in November burst and vermilion burst	
Slash	Snakepit Les Paul	Gibson and Epiphone	1997-2000		
Slash	Slash Les Paul Goldtop	Gibson and Epiphone	2008		
Slash	Slash Les Paul Standard	Gibson and Epiphone	2018–present	Available in November Burst and Appetite Burst	
Slash	1966 EDS-1275 Double Neck	Gibson and Epiphone	2019	Only 125 made	
Slash	AFD Les Paul Special II	Epiphone	2014–present		
St. Vincent	St. Vincent HHH	Music Man			
Stephen Carpenter	SC-20	ESP		Available in a left-handed model	
Stephen Carpenter	SC-600	ESP	2003		
Stephen Carpenter	SC-607	ESP			
Stephen Carpenter	SC-607B	ESP	2018, 2020	Bartione guitar that comes in green sparkle, red sparkle, and purple satin	
Stephen Carpenter	SC-608	ESP			
Stephen Carpenter	SC-608B	ESP		Baritone	
Stephen Carpenter	STEF B-7	ESP			
Stephen Carpenter	STEF B-8	ESP			
Stephen Carpenter	STEF-T7B	ESP			
Stephen Carpenter	Stephen Carpenter Signature	ESP	1999		
Steve Howe	ES-175 Steve Howe Signature	Gibson	2002		
Steve Lukather	LIII HSS	Music Man			
Steve Lukather	LK100D	Music Man			
Steve Lukather	Luke	Music Man			
Steve Lukather	RS1010SL	Ibanez			
Steve Lukather	Steve Lukather Signature Series	Valley Arts			
Steve Morse	Steve Morse	Music Man			
Steve Morse	SM-Y2D	Music Man			
Steve Ripley	Ripley	Kramer	1985-1987		
Steve Vai	EP5	Ibanez			
Steve Vai	JEM555	Ibanez	1994-2015	Came in black and white	
Steve Vai	JEM7BSB	Ibanez	1996-1998	Burnt stained blue	
Steve Vai	JEM7D	Ibanez	2004–present		
Steve Vai	JEM7V	Ibanez	1993		
Steve Vai	JEM7VP	Ibanez			
Steve Vai	JEM77FP	Ibanez	1988-2004	Floral pattern	
Steve Vai	JEM77 GMC	Ibanez	1992-1994	Green multi-colour	
Steve Vai	JEM77P	Ibanez	1991-1996; 2011 (re-issue)		
Steve Vai	JEM77 PMC	Ibanez	1991-1992	Purple multi-color	
Steve Vai	JEM777B	Ibanez	2005		
Steve Vai	JEM777DY	Ibanez	1987-1996		
Steve Vai	JEM777 V	Ibanez	1994		
Steve Vai	JEMJR	Ibanez		Available in black and white	
Steve Vai	JEMJRL	Ibanez			
Steve Vai	PIA3761	Ibanez	2020–present	Available in onyx black and stallion white	
Steve Vai	PIA3761C	Ibanez	2020–present		
Steve Vai	UV7	Ibanez	1990-1998	7-string	
Steve Vai	UV7 P	Ibanez	1994	7-string	
Steve Vai	UV70P	Ibanez			
Steve Vai	UV77	Ibanez	1990-1993	7-string	
Steve Vai	UV77PSN 25th Anniversary Passion & Warfare	Ibanez	2016		
Steve Vai	UV77RE 20th Anniversary Steve Vai Signature	Ibanez	2010	Limited edition to commemorate the 20th anniversary of the UV77. Only 100 produced.	
Steve Vai	UV777	Ibanez	1990	Variant of the UV7. 7-string.	
Stevie Ray Vaughan	Limited Edition Stevie Ray Vaughan Strat	Fender		30 produced	
Stevie Ray Vaughan	Stevie Ray Vaughan Stratocaster	Fender	1992–present		
Sungha Jung	Sungha Jung Signature	Lakewood		Grand concert model in the natural series with cutaway and pickup system	
Susan Tedeschi	Susan Tedeschi Telecaster	Fender	2024-		
Synyster Gates	Synyster Custom HT	Schecter			
Synyster Gates	Synyster Custom S	Schecter		Available in gloss black with gold pinstripes, gloss black with silver pinstripes, and satin gold burst. Also available in a left-handed model. Colours for the left-handed are gloss black with gold pinstripes and satin gold burst.	
Synyster Gates	Synyster Gates FR USA Signature	Schecter			
Synyster Gates	Synyster Gates FR QM USA Signature	Schecter			
Synyster Gates	Synyster Gates FR-S USA Signature	Schecter			
Synyster Gates	Synyster Standard	Schecter		Available in gloss black with silver pinstripes and gloss white with silver pinstripes.	
Synyster Gates	Synyster Standard HT	Schecter			
Synyster Gates	Synyster Gates 'SYN GA SC' Acoustic	Schecter			
Synyster Gates	Synyster Gates 'SYN J' Acoustic	Schecter			
Scott LePage	SLM10 Scott LePage signature	Ibanez	2019-2022		
Scott LePage	KRYS10 Scott LePage signature	Ibanez	2022-present		

== T ==
Artist	Model	Company	Production lifetime	Notes	Ref.
Tash Sultana	Tash Sultana Stratocaster	Fender	2020-	DoubleTap humbucker as bridge pick-up	
Taylor Swift	TSBT	Taylor			
Taylor Swift	TSBTe	Taylor			
Ted Aguilar	Ted-600T	ESP			
The Edge	The Edge Strat	Fender	2016-2020		
Thomas Blug	V6 Distressed Vintage White	Vintage			
Thomas Blug	V6 Summer of Love	Vintage			
Thomas Leeb	Thomas Leeb Signature	Lowden			
Thurston Moore	Thurston Moore Signature Jazzmaster	Fender	2009-2014		
Tim Armstrong	Hellcat	Fender		Available in 12-string and left-handed models	
Tim Henson	THBB10 Tim Henson Signature	Ibanez	2019-2022		
Tim Henson	TOD10N Tim Henson Signature	Ibanez	2022-present		
Tim Henson	TOD10 Tim Henson Signature	Ibanez	2022-present	Available in 7-string and left-handed models	
Tim Lerch	TLTX Chubby	Mike Lull			
Toby Keith	EF250TK Toby Keith Signature	Takamine			
Todd Kerns	Antistar VI	Prestige		Available in black and white	
Tom Bukovac	The Session Man	Duesenberg		Alliance Series	
Tom DeLonge	ES-333	Gibson and Epiphone			
Tom DeLonge	Standard 70's Stratocaster	Fender and Squier	Discontinued		
Tom Morello	Tom Morello "Soul Power" Stratocaster	Fender	2020-present		
Tommy Thayer	"Electric Blue" Les Paul	Epiphone			
Tommy Victor	Tommy Victor Devil-FR	Schecter			
Tony McManus	Tony McManus Private Stock	PRS			
Tony Iommi	Monkey SG Special	Gibson Custom Shop	2020		
Tony Iommi	Tony Iommi SG Special	Gibson	2021		
Tony Iommi	Tony Iommi SG Special	Epiphone	2022		
Tracii Guns	Gunstar Voyager	Kramer			
Tyler Bryant	Limited Edition Tyler Bryant "Pinky" Stratocaster Relic	Fender / Fender Custom Shop	2023		

== U ==
Artist	Model	Company	Production lifetime	Notes	Ref.
Uli Jon Roth	Dolphin	Sky	1983–present	Prototype for all Sky guitars. Part of the Classic Series.	
Uli Jon Roth	Emperor	Sky	1987–present	The original Emperor was built in 1987. The replica is part of the Classic Series.	
Uli Jon Roth	Excalibur	Sky	2018	Galaxy Dragon Series	
Uli Jon Roth	Infinity Sky	Sky		Galaxy Dragon Series	
Uli Jon Roth	Lionheart	Sky		Lionheart Sky Series. Available in 7-string.	
Uli Jon Roth	Mighty Wing	Sky		Classic Series	
Uli Jon Roth	Rembrandt Sky	Sky		Classic Series. 7-string.	
Uli Jon Roth	Sunrise Elite	Sky		Sky Elite Series. Available in 7-string	
Ulli Bögershausen (de)	Ulli Bögershausen Signature	Lakewood		Grand concert model with cutaway and pickup system	

== V ==
Artist	Model	Company	Production lifetime	Notes	Ref.
Vivian Campbell	NightSwan	Kramer	1987		

== W ==
Artist	Model	Company	Production lifetime	Notes	Ref.
Walter Becker	Walter Becker Signature	Sadowsky			
Warren DeMartini	Pro-Mod Blood and Skull	Charvel			
Warren DeMartini	Pro-Mod Snake	Charvel			
Warren DeMartini	USA Signature Frenchie	Charvel			
Warren DeMartini	USA Signature Snake	Charvel			
Warren DeMartini	USA Signature San Dimas	Charvel			
Wayne Hussey	Wayne Hussey Corsair-12	Schecter		12-string	
Wayne Kramer	Wayne Kramer Signature Strat	Fender	2011		
Wen Shang-yi	Mayday Monster Epiphone Signature Les Paul	Epiphone	2014	Limited run	
Will Adler	WA-Warbird	ESP			
Will Adler	Warbird Distressed	ESP			
Wolfgang Van Halen	SA-126		2022–present	January 26 is Eddie Van Halen's birthday	

== Y ==
Artist	Model	Company	Production lifetime	Notes	Ref.
Yngwie Malmsteen	Yngwie Malmsteen Stratocaster	Fender	1987-present		
Yngwie Malmsteen	Yngwie Malmsteen Standard Stratocaster	Fender	1990-1994	Japanese export	
Yngwie Malmsteen	Yngwie Malmsteen Tribute Stratocaster	Fender Custom Shop	2008		
Yngwie Malmsteen	Yngwie Malmsteen Signature Stratocaster	Fender	2019-present	Custom Artist Series	

== Z ==
Artist	Model	Company	Production lifetime	Notes	Ref.
Zach Myers	SE Zach Myers	PRS			
Zacky Vengeance	Zacky Vengeance 6661	Schecter		Available in left-handed models	
Zacky Vengeance	Zacky Vengeance Custom Reissue	Schecter		Available in left-handed models	
Zacky Vengeance	Zacky Vengeance ZV 6661 LH	Schecter			

== See also ==
- List of guitars
- List of signature model bass guitars
