= List of electric guitar brands =

This is a list of Wikipedia articles about brand names under which electric guitars have been sold.

== A ==
- Alembic
- Tom Anderson
- Aria

== C ==
- Caparison
- Carvin
- Chapman
- Charvel
- Cort

== D ==
- Danelectro
- D'Angelico
- Dean
- Dingwall
- Duesenberg

== E ==
- Eko
- Epiphone
- ESP

== F ==
- Fender
- Fender Japan
- Fernandes
- First Act
- Framus

== G ==
- G&L
- Gibson
- Godin
- Greco
- Gretsch
- Guild Guitar Company

== H ==
- Hagström
- Hallmark
- Hamer
- Harmony
- Heritage
- Höfner

== I ==
- Ibanez

== J ==
- Jackson

== K ==
- Kay
- Kiesel
- Kramer

== L ==
- Langcaster

== M ==
- Mayones
- Mosrite
- Music Man

== P ==
- Parker
- PRS

== R ==
- B.C. Rich
- Rickenbacker
- Reverend Guitars

== S ==
- Samick
- Schecter
- Shergold
- Silvertone
- Steinberger
- Suhr

== T ==
- Tagima
- TEISCO
- Tokai
- James Tyler

== U ==
- Univox

== V ==
- Valco
- Vigier
- VOX

== W ==
- Warwick
- Washburn
- Westbury

== Y ==
- Yamaha

== Z ==
- Zemaitis
