= PRS Silver Sky =

Solid body electric guitar from PRS

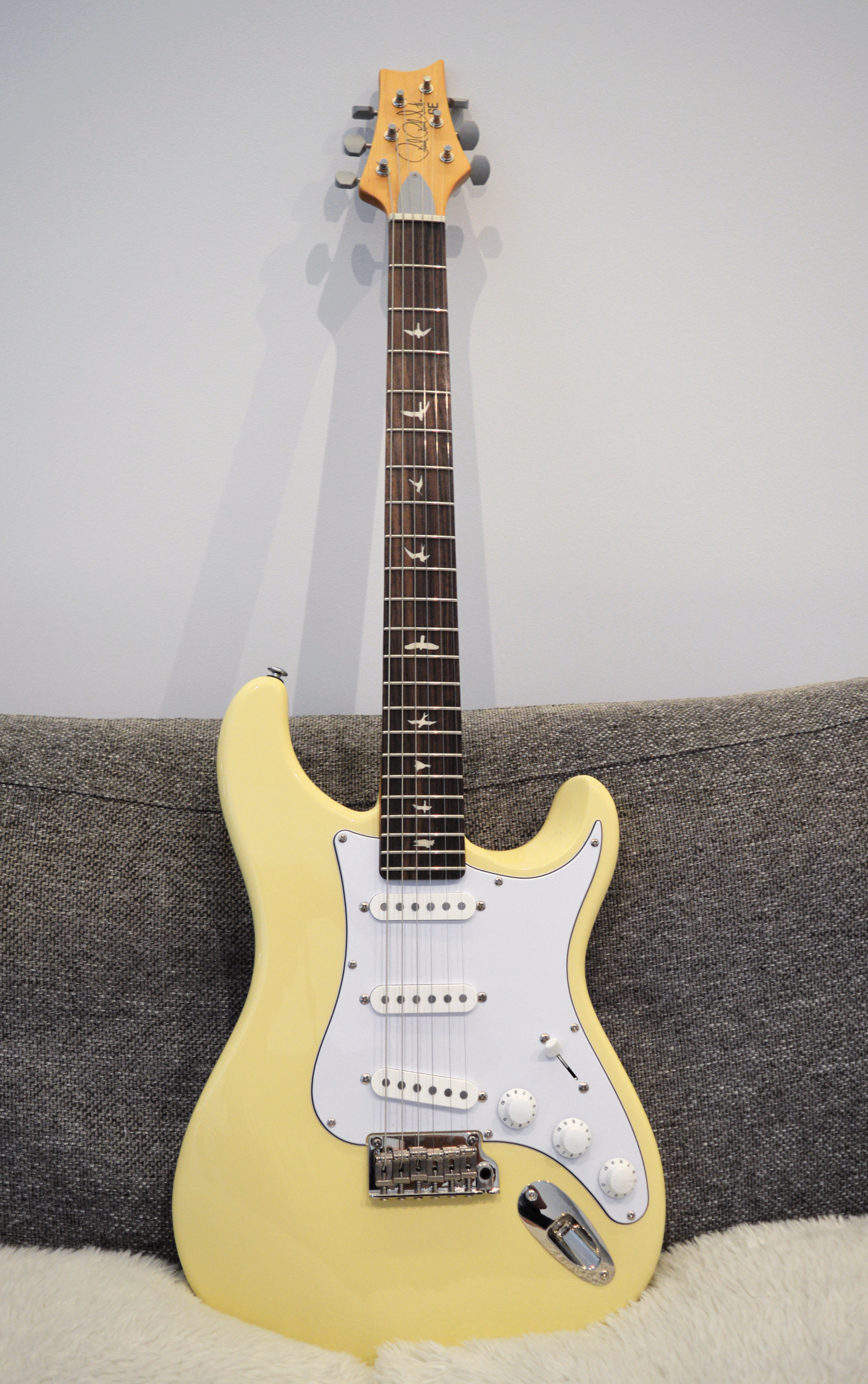
- Manufacturer: PRS
- Period: 2018–present (Core); 2022–present (SE)

Construction
- Body type: Solid
- Neck joint: Bolt-on
- Scale: 25.5 inches (647.7 mm)

Woods
- Body: Alder (Core); Poplar (SE)
- Neck: Maple
- Fretboard: Rosewood; Maple

Hardware
- Bridge: Six-screw steel vibrato (Core); Two-point steel vibrato (SE)
- Pickup(s): Three 635JM single-coils (Core); Three 635JM "S" single-coils (SE)

Colors available
- Various

The PRS Silver Sky is an electric guitar model produced by PRS Guitars and co-designed with John Mayer as his signature model with the brand. The Silver Sky's concept combines a Fender Stratocaster-style body with PRS design elements, like a revised version of their headstock shape and signature birds-in-flight fretboard inlays. Mayer had previously been an endorser of Fender guitars with his own signature model Stratocaster, but Mayer ended the partnership in 2014 to pursue new guitar designs with Paul Reed Smith. Upon its release in 2018, the Silver Sky quickly became one of the industry's best-selling guitars, while simultaneously facing backlash among many guitarists over its similarities to the Strat—a combination that led Guitar World to dub the Silver Sky a "phenomenon... the guitar that 'broke' the internet."

== Production ==
=== Development ===
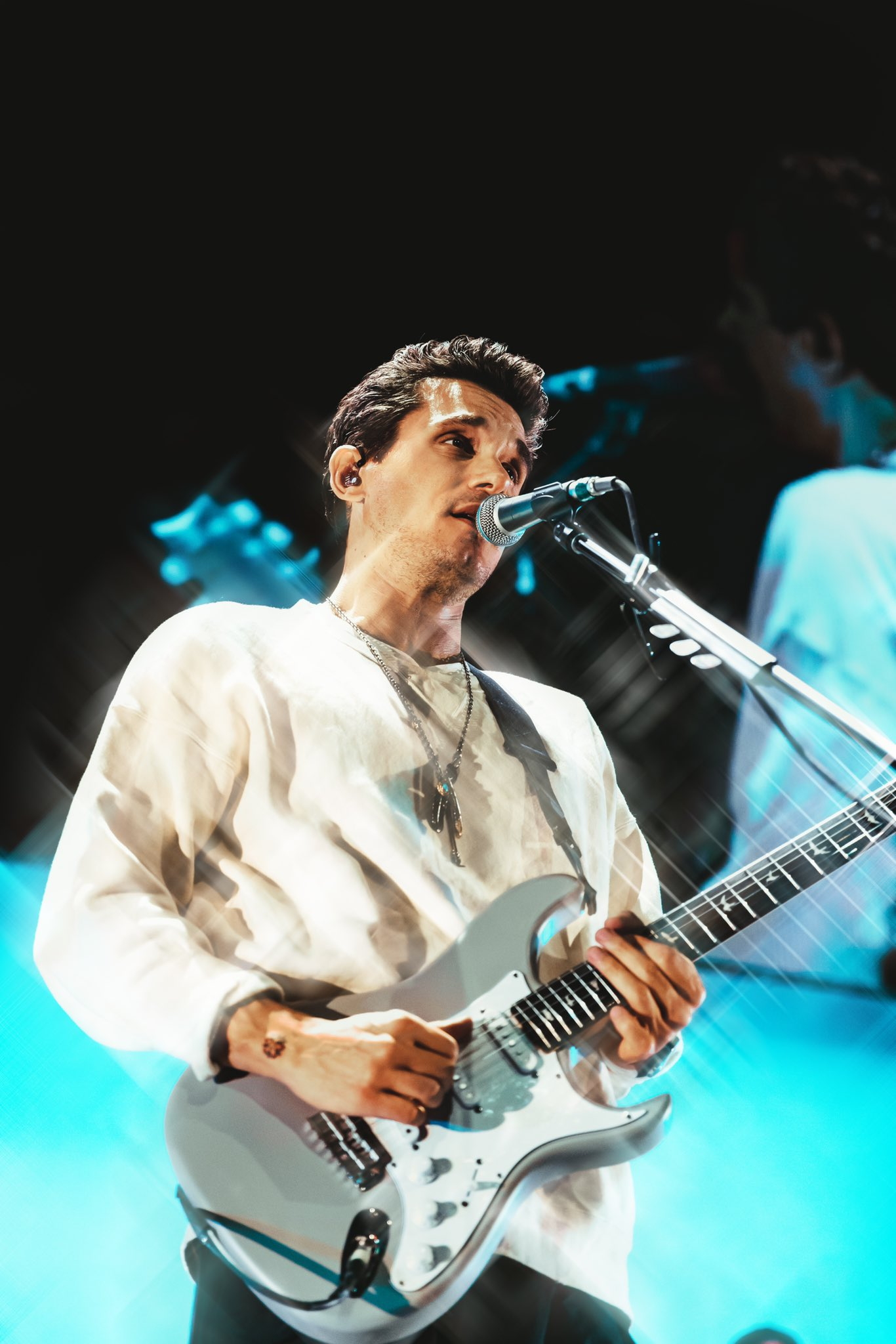
Mayer performing with a Silver Sky in 2019.

While a Fender-endorsed artist, Mayer sought to design a guitar with greater consistency in production quality while having room to develop and build on his own ideas, but he found Fender unreceptive. In approaching PRS, Mayer valued being able to collaborate with Paul Reed Smith himself as the company owner. In 2016, PRS released their first guitar designed with Mayer, the "Super Eagle," and then in 2017 the "Super Eagle II"—both exotic, high-end guitars produced in limited numbers. But Mayer sought to look "deeper into the genetic code of things" and produce a series of guitars for the mass market that represented his point of view. Mayer rejected the notion of the Silver Sky as a conventional signature model, opting not to use his name on the front of the headstock or to brand it as such. He instead chose to use the name "Silver Sky," which he said might have been a fragment of a forgotten song lyric but liked it because it sounded mysterious and felt consistent with PRS's bird nomenclature.

On social media, Mayer teased the upcoming release of the guitar, while leaked photos of prototypes being used at gigs led to significant public anticipation. Upon its official release in March 2018, the Silver Sky made, as Guitar wrote, "the kind of waves that went beyond the wildest dreams of even the most ambitious marketing department." The first 500 models shipped with a commemorative hard-shell case.

=== Design ===
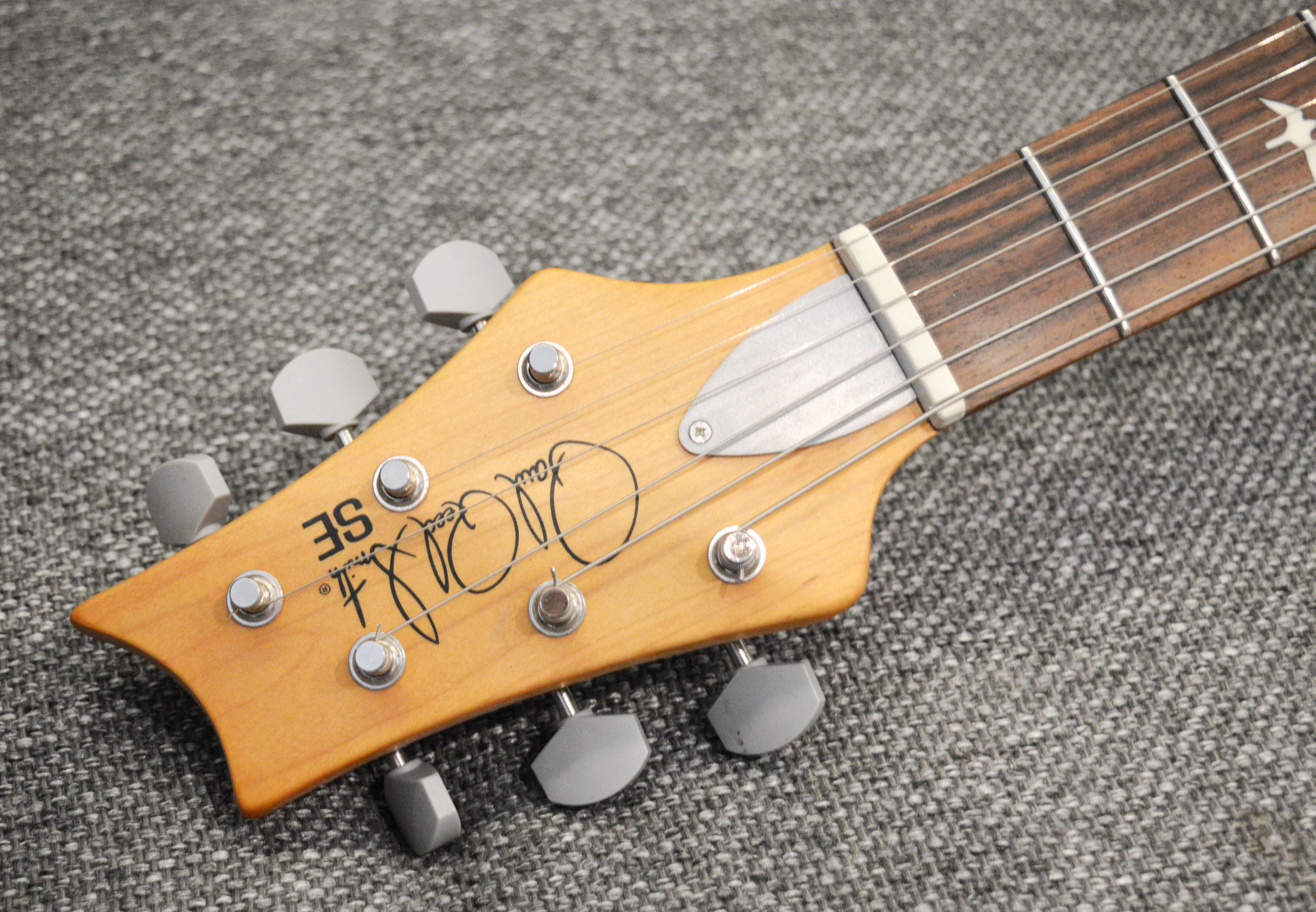
Close-up of the "reverse" PRS headstock design.

In its first review of the Silver Sky, Guitar wrote that it "takes many cues from the Stratocaster, but also includes nods to modernity and several features that are synonymous with PRS." Mayer described the Silver Sky as "sort of a higher-definition Strat."

The Silver Sky features an overall design similar to a Stratocaster, including its three single-coil pickups, alder body, 25.5" scale length, and bolt-on maple neck, but departs from Fender's guitar with elements like a reverse PRS-style headstock with three tuners per side, birds-in-flight fretboard inlays, and a carved treble horn to aid access to the upper frets. The neck has a vintage-style 7.25" fretboard radius and a profile meant to fall halfway between 1963 and 1964 carves. The Silver Sky uses closed-back tuners with PRS's own locking mechanisms, a bone nut, double-action truss rod, and 22 "Acoustic" frets that are larger than those used in vintage Fenders but smaller than those in other PRS models. Its original color options were Horizon, Tungsten, Frost, and Onyx. PRS has since established an "annual tradition" of introducing new finishes to the line, such as the popular Roxy Pink, limited-edition Nebula, and the matte Faded Black Tee Satin. All color options initially had rosewood fretboards with later editions offering maple. In designing the guitar's custom 635JM pickups, Mayer sought to replicate his '64 Strat pickups while improving clarity and reducing the inherent "quack" of the two and four pickup selector positions.

PRS debuted left-handed Silver Sky versions in 2024.

=== SE model ===
Two years after the introduction of the USA-made Silver Sky, PRS and Mayer began developing a version for the brand's affordable, "SE" line of guitars manufactured outside of the United States. PRS initially began manufacturing the SE Silver Sky in Indonesia in partnership with Cor-Tek, using the same facility as Cort Guitars. In 2022, the SE models moved to a new building dedicated to PRS's SE line-ups. Changes to the SE model include using a cheaper wood—poplar instead of alder—for the body, an altered neck profile, and Cor-Tek produced pickups.

The SE Silver Sky was Reverb.com's best-selling electric guitar model for both 2022 and 2023.

== Reception ==
With photos having leaked ahead of the Silver Sky's announcement in March 2018, many guitarists took to online message boards and social media to express disapproval over the Silver Sky's similarities to the Stratocaster, with commentators dismissing the guitar as a Strat copy with the "wrong" headstock and claiming the guitar is a "betrayal" of both Fender and PRS. PRS's chief operating officer, Jack Higginbotham, later acknowledged the similarities to the Strat as the elephant in the room, but argued the Silver Sky was not simply a copy but instead represented a re-examining of every facet of the Strat's design while adding "PRS-isms" such as the bird inlays and three-tuners-to-a-side headstock. Mayer was not surprised by the backlash: "The initial response to the Silver Sky was pretty negative because people tend to resist anything new... Truth is, I don't think guitarists are really saying they don't like the Silver Sky. They're just reacting. I've seen the lifespan of people's negative reactions enough to understand what it means. What most people are really asking is, 'What is this? What are you trying to do?' You just need to get through the period that people register their confusion and dissent." Company founder Paul Reed Smith noted that the public perception of the Silver Sky changed dramatically for the positive when Mayer live-streamed its first demo.

In a 2018 review, Guitar World acknowledged the Silver Sky's similarities to the Stratocaster, but approvingly noted its design changes and unique mid-range clarity compared to Fender's guitars. The piece dismissed any controversy, concluding, "For aficionados of the classic three single-coil pickup solidbody guitar design, this is truly one of the finest examples ever produced." Guitar World later included the Silver Sky in its 2025 list of the 50 best pieces of guitar gear of the century so far.

== Fender copyright claim ==
In May 2026, the Fender issued a cease and desist order to PRS regarding the Silver Sky after Fender won a default judgment in a copyright claim over the Stratocaster shape in German court. As a result, cease and desist letters were issued to a number of manufacturers and builders whose Stratocaster-style guitars, Fender claimed, violated their copyright on the guitar shape. A report in the Wall Street Journal stated that PRS "disagrees with Fender’s assessment and declined to comment further."
