= Cort MBC-1 Matthew Bellamy Signature =

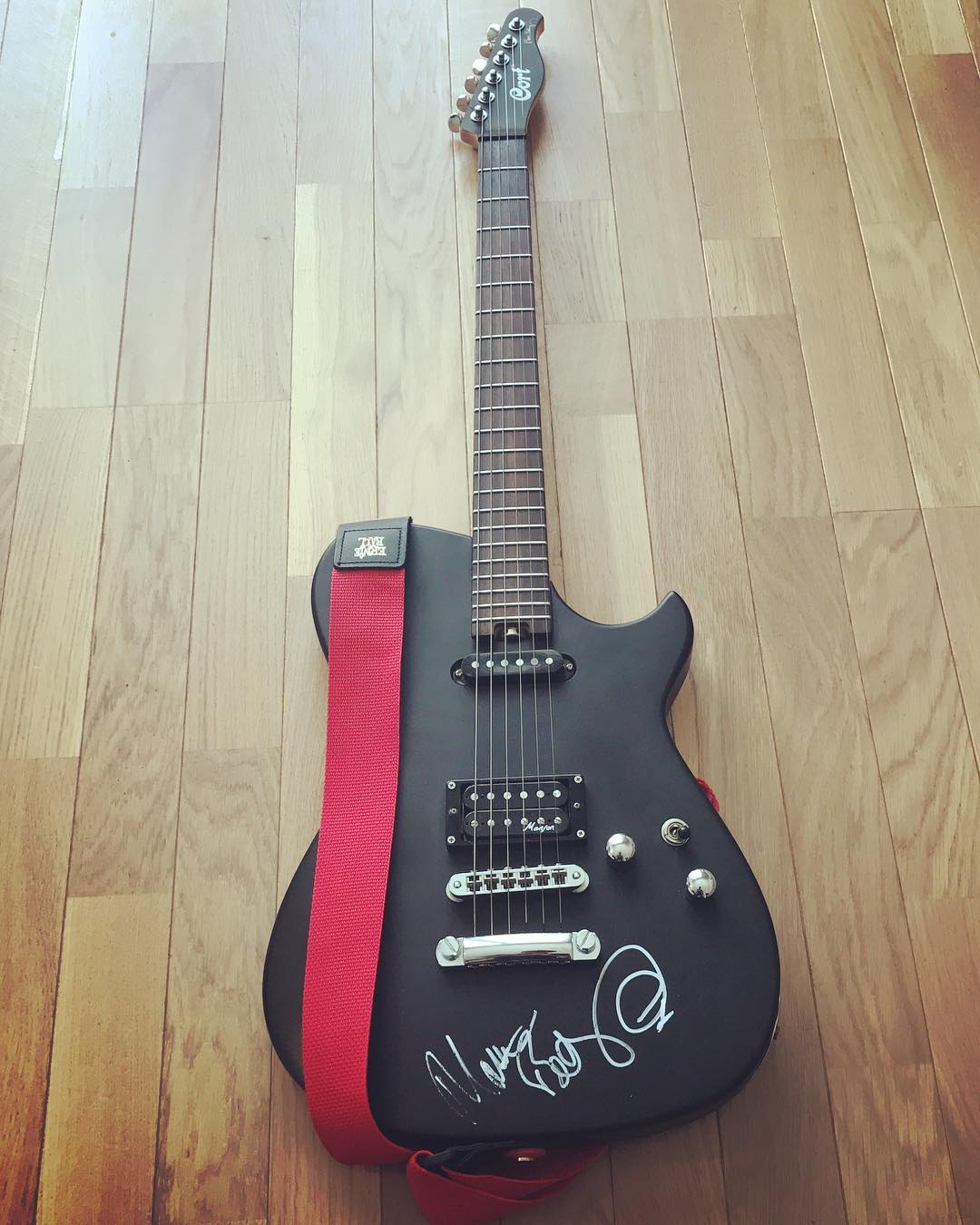
- Matt Black guitar with real Bellamy's signature
- Manufacturer: Cort Guitars
- Period: 2015-present

Construction
- Body type: Solid
- Neck joint: Bolt-on
- Scale: 25.5 in (648 mm)

Woods
- Body: Basswood
- Neck: Maple
- Fretboard: Rosewood

Hardware
- Bridge: Tune-O-Matic with stopbar
- Pickup(s): 1 Single-coil Manson at the neck and 1 Humbucker Manson at the bridge

Colors available
- Matt Black; Red Sparkle; Matt White Show

External videos
- Presentation from Hugh Manson on NAMM 2015
- Demonstration Cort MBC-1 from Manson Guitar Works на YouTube
- Demo from Premier Guitar на YouTube
- Guitar review from Guitarist magazine on YouTube

Cort MBC-1 is the signature guitar of Matt Bellamy, lead singer and guitarist of the English rock band Muse, launched in 2015 in Indonesia. It was designed by Bellamy and Hugh Manson in collaboration with Cort Guitars, and based on Manson MB Series.

== History ==
Bellamy was actively involved in the creation of the guitar, testing each prototype and giving instructions on what needed to be changed. What took the most time was creating the truss rod, neck, and pickups, which were difficult to recreate in the factory.

The release of this guitar was announced in early December 2014 and premiered at the NAMM exhibition in January 2015 with a price of £500.

Premier Guitar magazine reviewed the model in 2015 and awarded it the Premier Gear designation, noting a 5 out of 5 score for playability, a 4.5 score for tone and value, and a 4 out of 5 score for build/design.

== Design and varieties ==
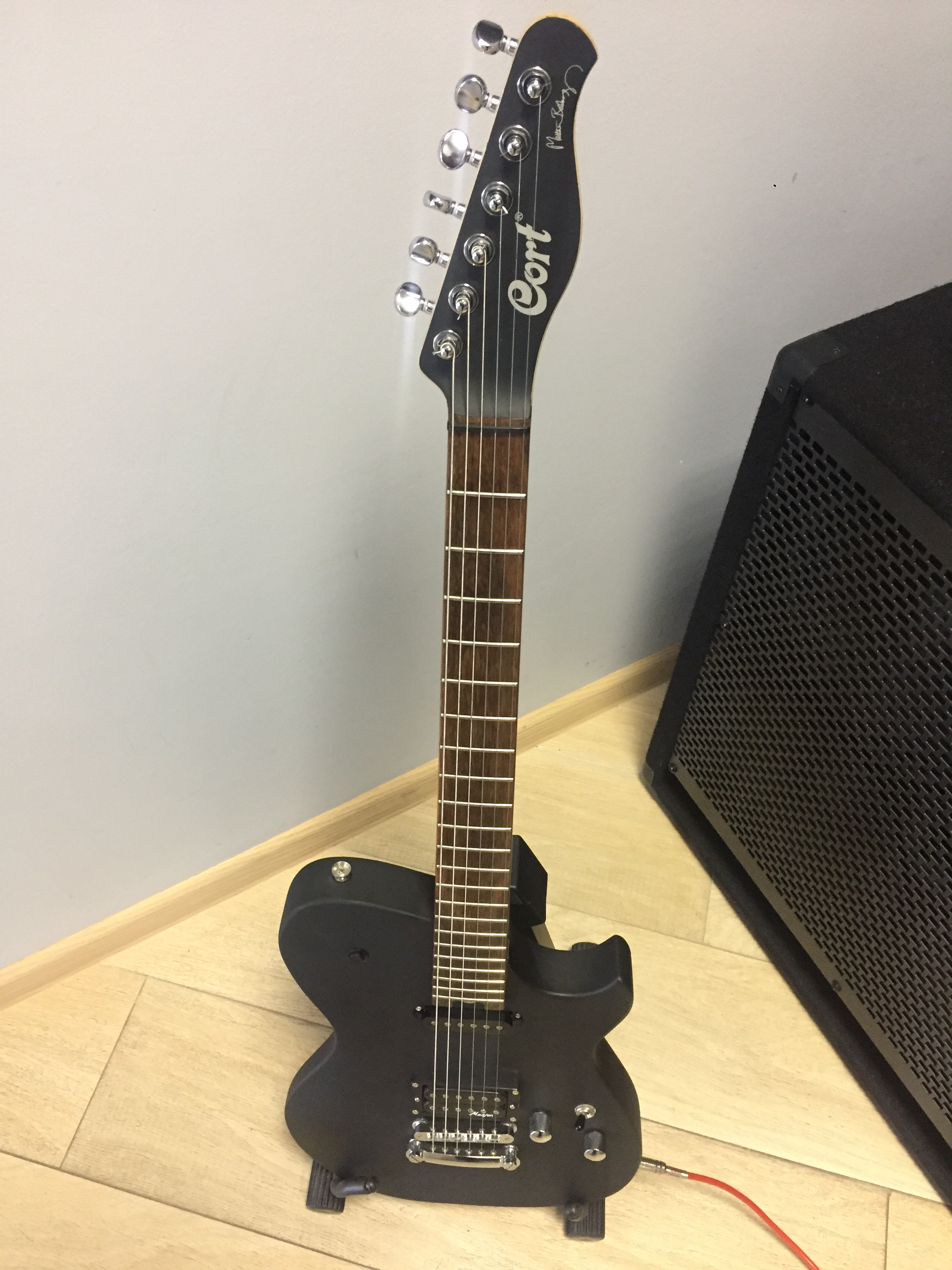

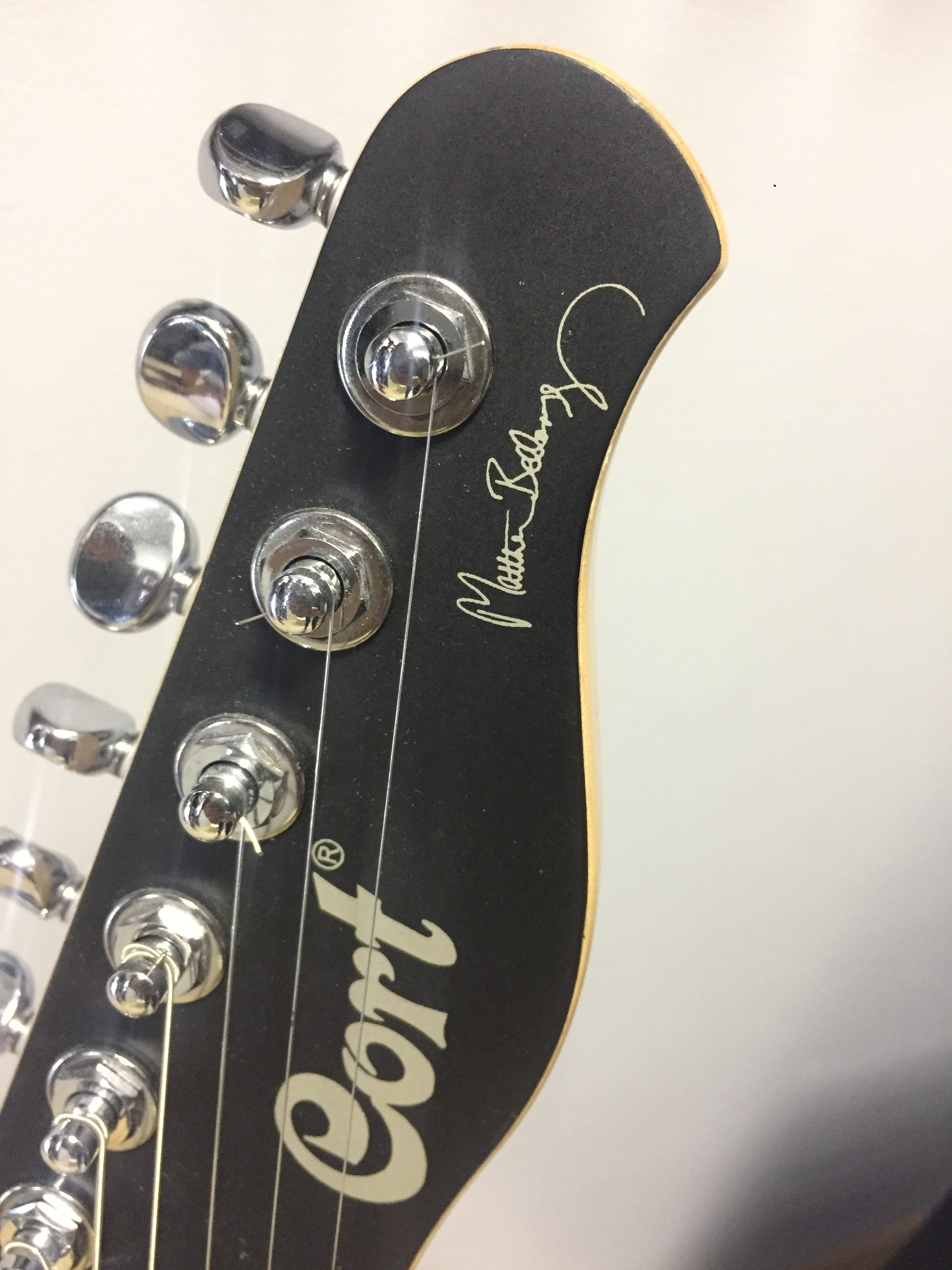
Headstock in front with signature

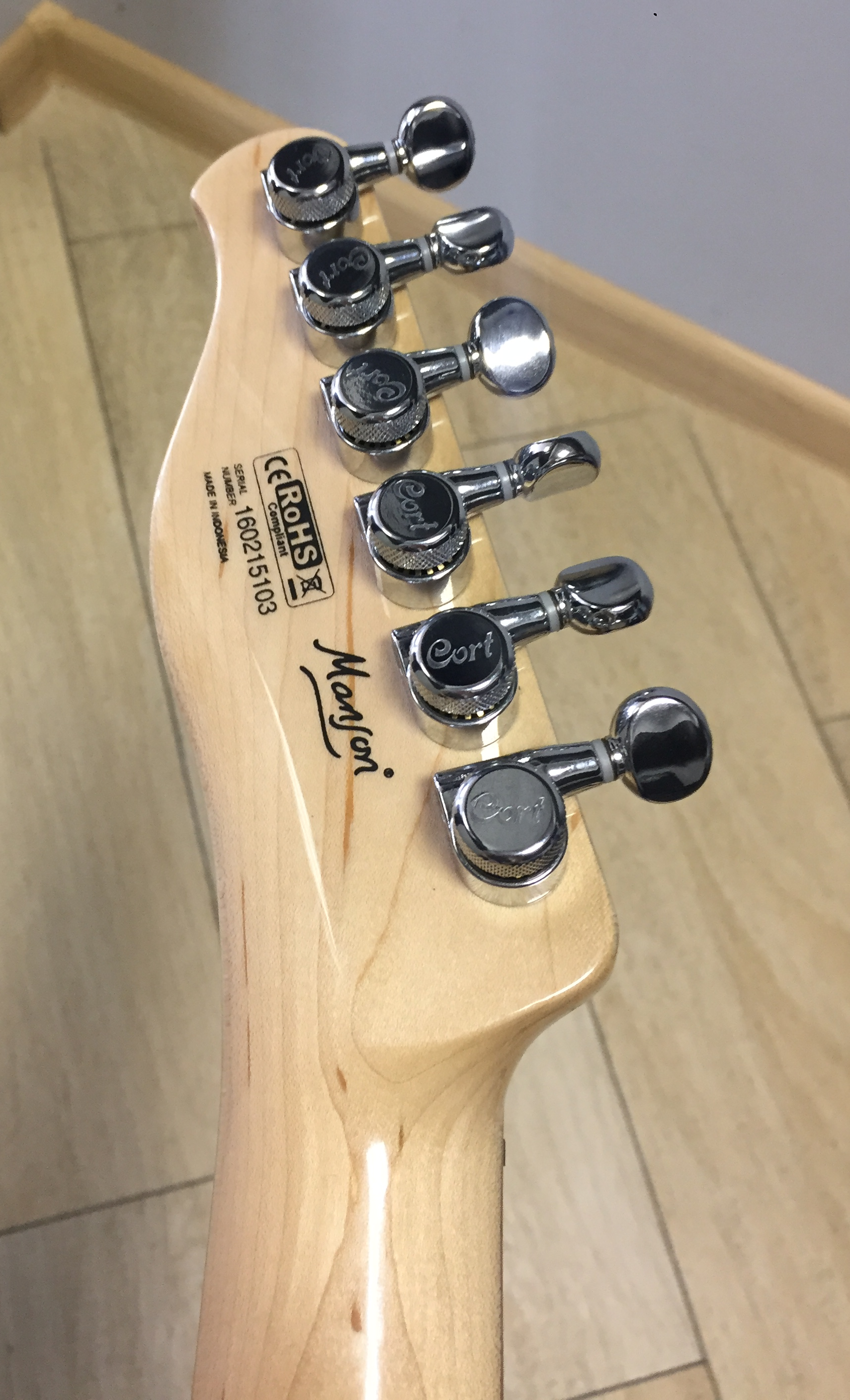
Headstock from behind with serial number

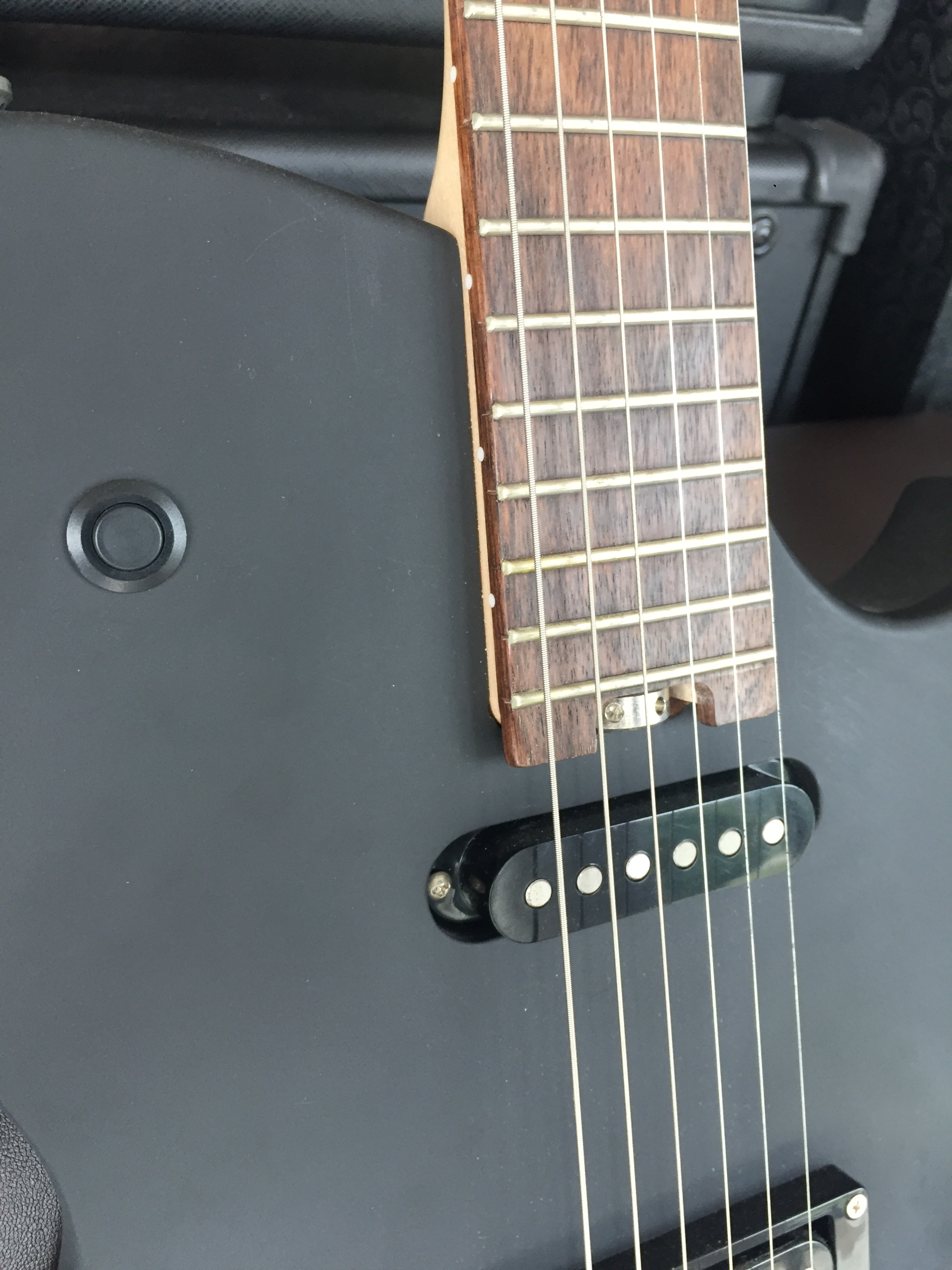
Killswitch and single coil

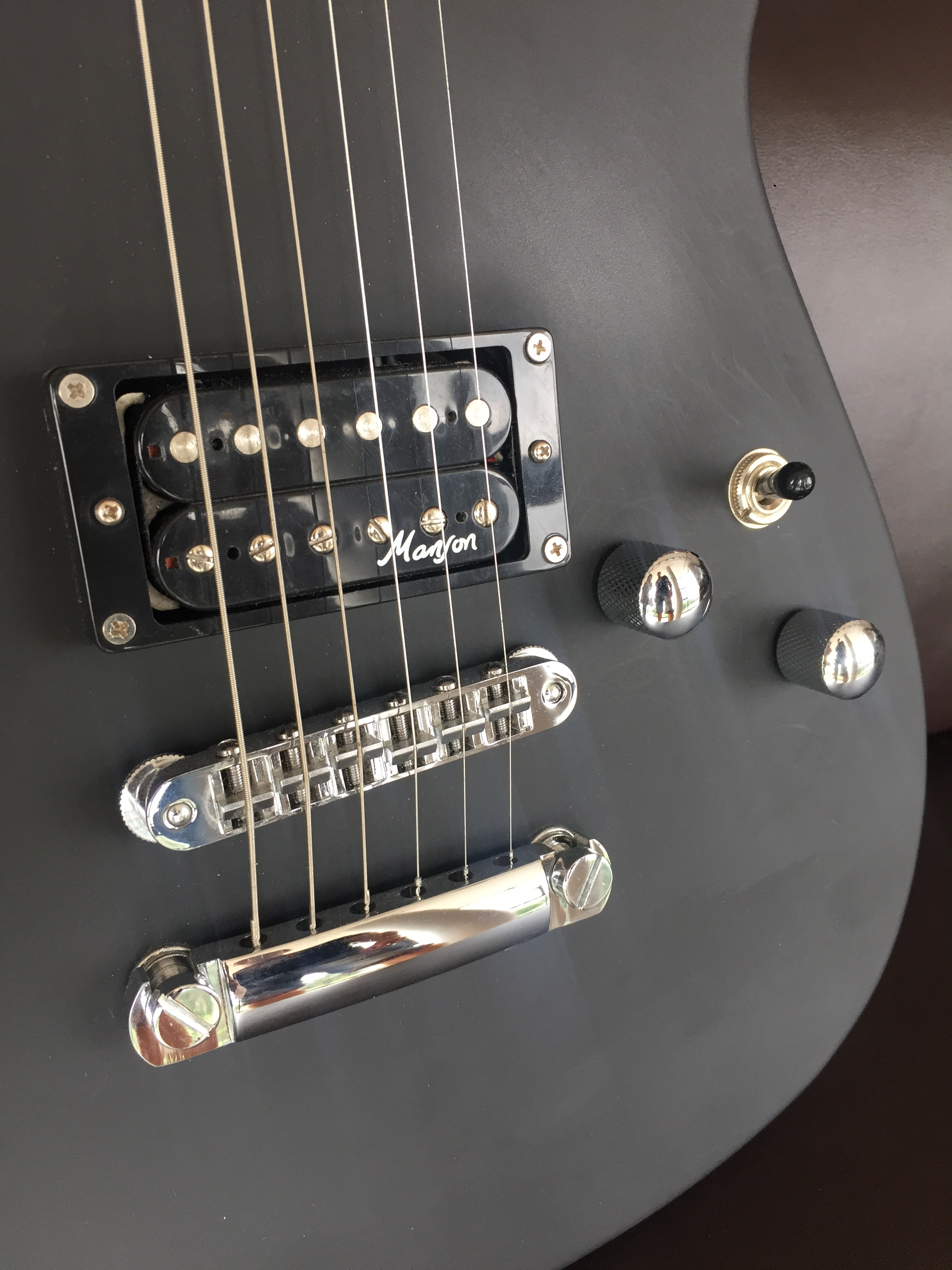
Tune-o-matic and humbucker

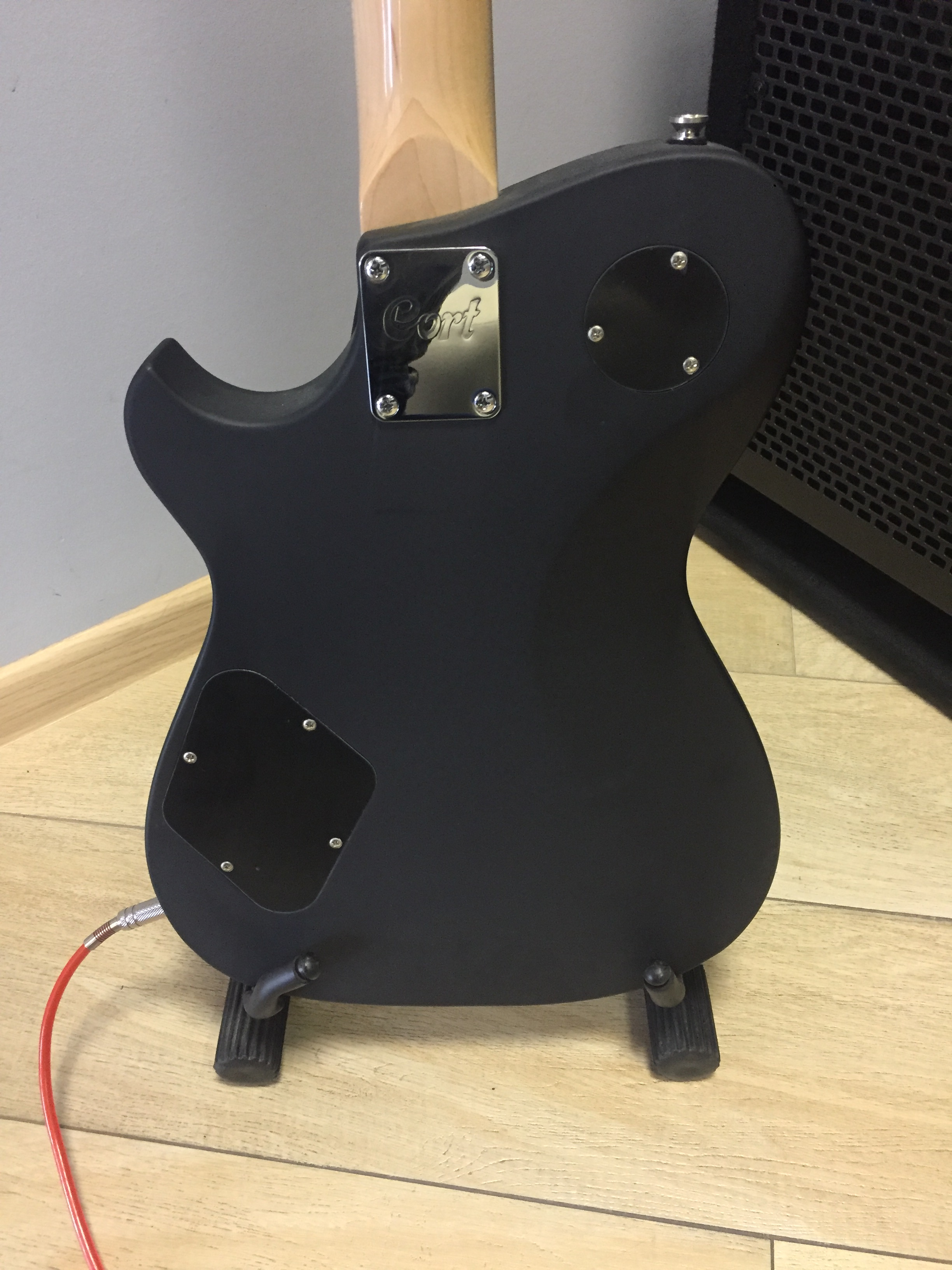
Body from behind

Guitar has solid Telecaster-form body made from tilia, maple neck and rosewood fingerboard with compound radius.

Modifications of Cort MBC-1:

- MBC-1 MBLK — Matt Black colour.
- MBC-1 RS — Red Sparkle colour.
- MBC-1 LH — Matt black version for left-handed people.
- MBC-1 Matt White Show Special Stormtrooper Edition.

Manson Guitar Works are proposing modernization of guitar

- upgrade with Sustaiac Pro sustainer;
- installing Z.Vex Fuzz Factory;
- replacement of hardware;
- replacement of machineheads and control knobs.

== Awards and nominations ==
This guitar was nominated on Music and Sound Awards and MIA Awards, as «Best electric guitar» and «Electric guitar of the year», and won the last one. Besides, it was marked as "Premier Gear" by Premier Guitar, magazine Total Guitar called it «Best buy» (5/5).

Year	Nominated work	Category	Award	Result	Notes	Ref.
2015	Cort MBC-1	Best Electric Guitar	Music and Sound Awards	Nominated		
2015	Cort MBC-1	Electric Guitar of the Year	Music Industries Association Award	Won		

== Sources ==
- "Cort Manson MBC-1 Matthew Bellamy Signature". Gear. Total Guitar. No. 263. United Kingdom. 82. EAN: 9-771355-504062.
