= George Lowden =

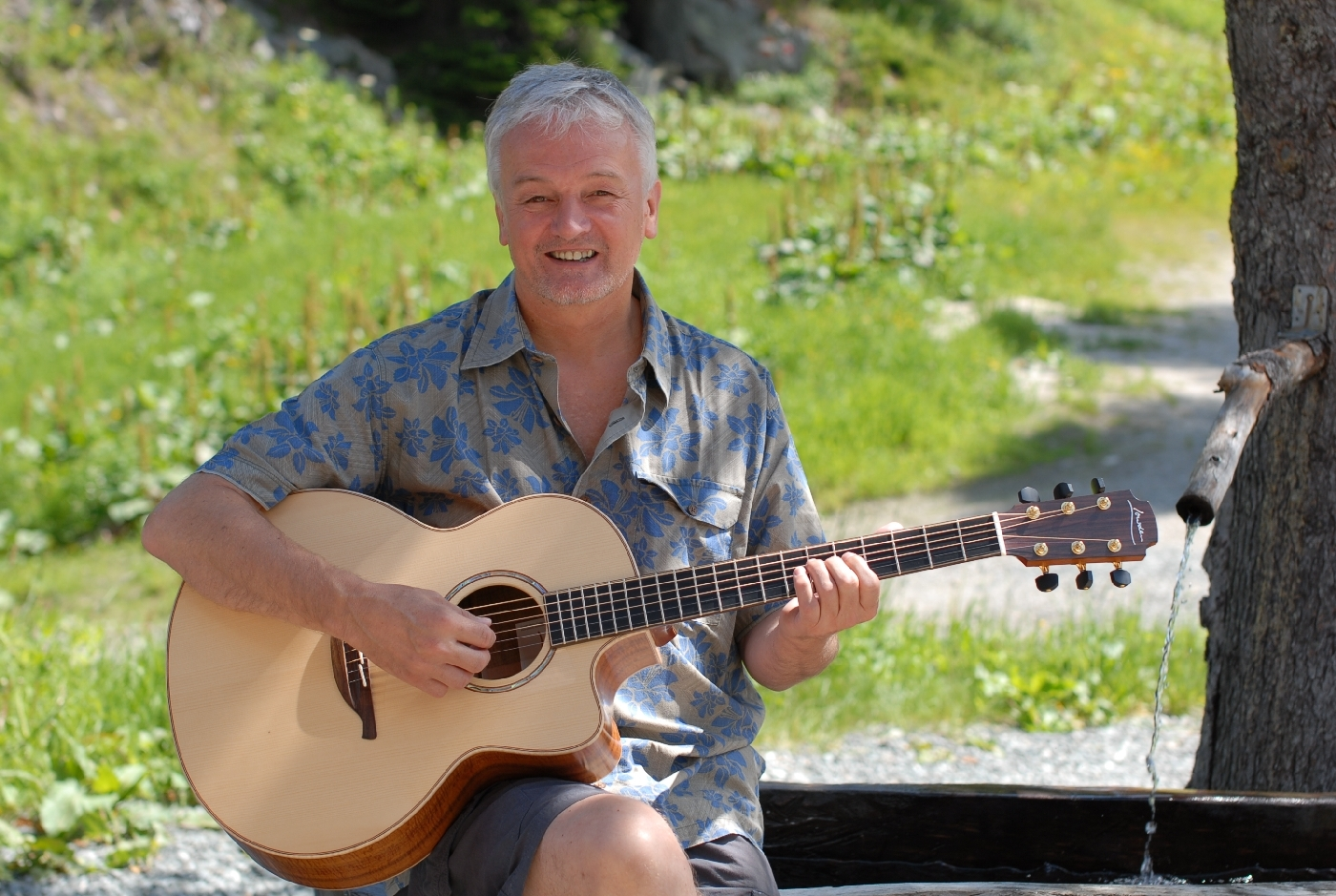
- George Lowden in 2009

Background information
- Born: George Lowden; 1952 (age 73–74); Bangor, County Down
- Occupation: Luthier
- Years active: 1962–present

George Lowden is a luthier based in Downpatrick, County Down, Northern Ireland. He constructs steel and nylon string acoustic guitars by hand without any UV finishing as well as solid-body electric guitars.

== Early life ==
George Lowden was born in Bangor, Northern Ireland in 1952. He made his first guitar at the age of 10.

== Company ==
Lowden founded George Lowden Guitars in 1974 at the age of 22 and soon completed Lowden guitar serial No.1.

Lowden used A-frame bracing on his first guitars, but from 1976 he used his own modified A-bracing system with a dolphin voicing profile which in many ways established the Lowden guitar's unique sound.

His first Irish studio/workshop, in 6a High Street, Bangor employed four trainee guitar makers, Colin ‘Dusty’ Miller, Frank Kernaghan, Sam Irwin and Michael Hull. Approximately 100 guitars were produced during this period, and can be identified by their small blue rectangular labels.

Beginning in 1980, Lowden licensed manufacturing of his guitars to a small group of master luthiers in Japan, near Nagoya. Initially four models were soon being produced within a few years this had risen up to 15 and by the mid 1980s up to 1,000 Lowdens were being produced in Japan. In 1985, as a result of the rise in interest for all electronic instruments in music, sales of acoustic instruments slumped worldwide and the owners of the Japanese factory decided to close it and move production of Lowden guitars to a larger factory where other rival brands were made. Lowden was concerned about this outcome, and decided to try setting up a new factory in Ireland. With little capital and through the help of an investor (David Jebb), he rented a building in the Balloo Industrial Estate in Bangor, County Down and began to employ and train new craftsmen.

=== Change of ownership ===
The acoustic guitar market had begun to flourish again during the 1990s, but the company, significantly hampered by under-investment, had not been able to achieve its potential. In November 1998, keen to participate in a progressive plan to develop the business further, George Lowden, along with Steve McIlwrath and Alastair McIlveen, set up a new holding company to buy a controlling interest in the Lowden Guitar Company. Lowden's vision was, "...that the company should become as good as the guitars themselves…"

=== 25th anniversary ===
In November 1998, a visitor arrived at the factory with the Lowden guitar serial No. 1, the very first guitar Lowden designed and built. Inspired by this, and as a celebration of how far he had come, Lowden designed the 25th-anniversary limited-edition model. "My aim with the design and build details was to make available in reasonable numbers, a guitar which was as close as possible to the guitars which I am only able to build personally for a very few players each year under my full name. I therefore included as many as I could of the construction, voicing and cosmetic details, found in my own guitars in this limited edition of 101 instruments."

=== Millennium Twins ===
By this time, the community of Lowden enthusiasts had grown considerably. Players were attracted by Lowden's tone and quality, and by the fact that they were not mass-produced. To fulfill requests for ‘special edition’ Lowdens, Lowden designed the Millennium Twins. "As a luthier, I find that designing a few ‘special’ guitars does stretch my creative abilities and I enjoy that challenge. I believe this does help to develop the art of guitar making in a much wider sense as well. I introduced the limited edition Millennium twins with their matching sets of figured walnut back and sides and adjacent sets of redwood tops sourced from trees, which had fallen naturally."

In 2002 the company introduced the more affordable Avalon range.

In 2003, the licence with the Lowden Guitar Co ended and production of Lowden guitars at the Newtownards factory ceased at the end of December 2003.

=== George Lowden Guitars Ltd. ===
Since 2004, Lowden guitars have been manufactured by a family-run company in Downpatrick, County Down.

=== Notable users of Lowden guitars ===
Among the artists who have played Lowden guitars have been Damien Rice, Jan Akkerman, Pierre Bensusan, David Gray, Michael Hedges, Jacques Stotzem, Richard Thompson, Luka Bloom, Dermot Kennedy, Niall Horan, Gary Lightbody and Ed Sheeran.
