= Jim Triggs =

American luthier

Jim Triggs is an American luthier, described as the "P.T. Barnum of guitar makers." He grew up in Kansas, where he taught himself how to build mandolins and violins. He began building guitars in the early 1980s, influenced by such luthiers as John D'Angelico, Elmer Stromberg, and Lloyd Loar, and went to work for Gibson Guitar Corporation in 1986 as one of the master luthiers in Gibson's custom shop. He is known mainly for archtop guitars and mandolins.
