= Beneteau Guitars =

Beneteau is the name of the high-end acoustic guitars built by Marc Beneteau in South-Western Ontario, Canada since 1974.
