= Ibanez Universe =

Seven-string electric guitar

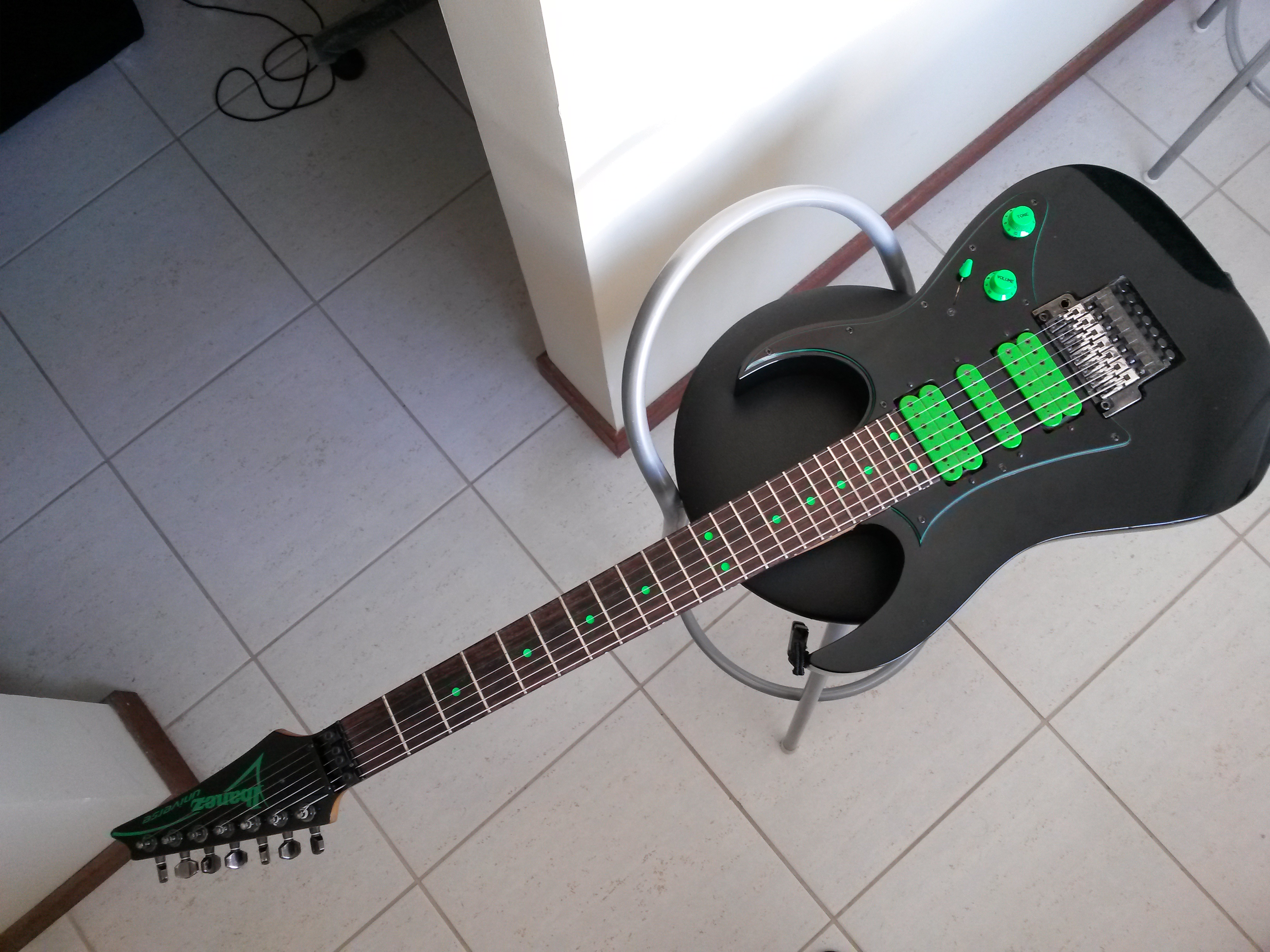
- Manufacturer: Ibanez
- Period: 1990 — 1994, 1996 — present

Construction
- Body type: Solid
- Neck joint: Bolt-on neck

Woods
- Body: American basswood
- Neck: Maple, wenge
- Fretboard: Rosewood, rarely maple

Hardware
- Bridge: Ibanez Lo-Pro Edge 7
- Pickup: H-S-H: DiMarzio Blaze II

Colors available
- White, black, multicolor swirl, green

The Ibanez Universe is the first mass-produced solid body seven-string electric guitar, developed by Steve Vai and manufactured by Ibanez. The Universe is a seven-string version of the Ibanez JEM series, Vai's signature model. It slightly differs from the JEM due to the absence of a "monkey grip" cut-out handle on the body.

== History ==
The first Ibanez Universe models, the UV7 and UV77, appeared on the market in 1990, though Vai had played prototypes in live performances before that, and used it for his guitar parts on Whitesnake's 1989 album Slip of the Tongue. The UV7 was available in white (UV7PWH) or black with green appointments (UV7BK).

The UV77 was available in a swirled multicolor finish (UV77MC) and is now considered a collector's item. The production UV77MCs were swirled first in Japan. Steve Vai had agreed to only allow the guitars to be produced if they were swirled at the same place his prototypes were: About Time Designs. After a brief period, the UV77MC Japanese Swirls were aborted in favor of the ATD-Swirled ones. The ATD swirled models were done at the ATD factory by Darren Johansen on Long Island N.Y.

In 1991, Ibanez also introduced the UV777. The most expensive Universe at the time, it was available in green with a black (white pearloid on some models) pickguard and green/yellow appointments (UV777GR). It also featured a maple fingerboard as opposed to rosewood.

The UV7PWH and UV77MC were produced from 1990–1993, the UV777 from 1991–1993 and the UV7BK from 1990-1994. Ibanez did not produce any Universe guitars in 1995 due to low demand, but re-introduced the UV7BK in 1996 largely due to renewed popularity due to its adoption by numerous heavy metal bands: Korn, an alternative metal band, Dream Theater, a progressive metal band, Fear Factory, an industrial metal band, as well as progressive metal bands Meshuggah and Voivod, and also death metal bands Cannibal Corpse and Morbid Angel. In 1997 Ibanez introduced an 'all black' variation with model designation UV7SBK. Instead of the green details used in UV7BK, the UV7SBK had silver dots on the rosewood fretboard and a silver Ibanez logo headstock inlay. The pickups, knobs and pickup toggle switch were black as well. The UV7SBK was in production only in 1997 and the manufacturing quantities are unknown.

In 1998, the UV7BK was replaced with the UV777BK. It has been through some minor changes since its inception, but currently features a 5-piece maple/wenge neck with bound rosewood fingerboard, bound head, 24 large frets, a basswood body, DiMarzio Blaze pickups, "disappearing pyramid" fingerboard inlays, a "Light without Heat" pyramid logo below the bridge and black finish with white binding and mirror pickguard. The UV777BK also is the first Universe to feature Ibanez's AANJ (All Access Neck Joint), a rounded heel that replaces the old Strat-style plate attachment to the body. The AANJ makes playing more comfortable and increases the sustain of the upper frets, since they are located over the neck itself, instead of an extension.

In 2010, Ibanez reissued the UV77MC as the limited-edition UV77REMC to celebrate the Universe's 20th anniversary. Only 100 examples will be made with only 60 of these guitars available in the United States.

Many of Ibanez's competitors soon began to add 7-strings to their lineups, Around this time, Ibanez also added 7-string guitars to the RG series, its standard line of hard rock guitars.

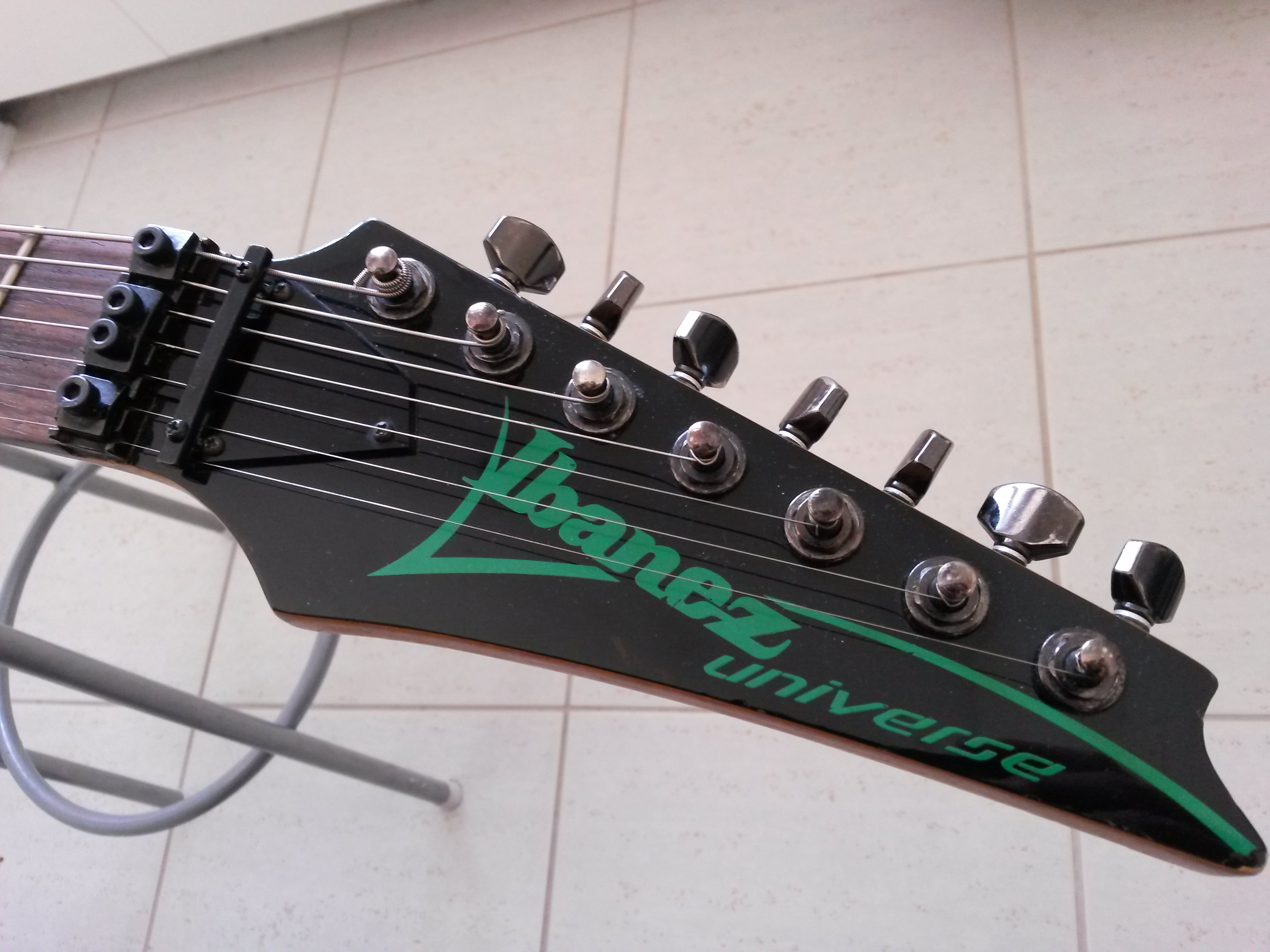
Headstock of UV7BK model

In 2014 Ibanez introduced a "Premium" (Indonesian made) tribute to the original UV7 called the UV70P (and later UV71PWH) as the only available Universe models alongside a 7 string version of the JEM.

== Product lineup ==
- 1990 - UV7PWH, UV7BK, UV77MC
- 1991 - UV777GR
- 1997 - UV7SBK
- 1998 - UV777PBK
- 2010 - UV77MC Reissue
- 2016 - UV77PSN, UV77SVR, UV77WFR (Passion & Warfare 25th anniversary models)
