= Sadowsky =

American manufacturer of guitars and bass guitars

Sadowsky Guitars
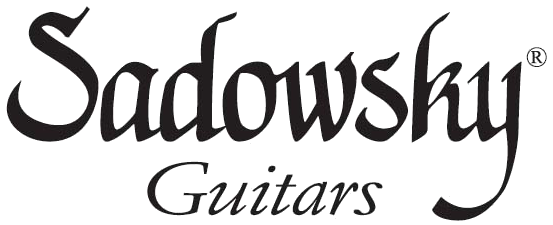
- Type: Private
- Industry: Musical instruments
- Founded: 1979
- Founder: Roger Sadowsky
- Headquarters: Long Island City, Queens, New York City, United States
- Products: Electric bass guitars, electric guitars, archtop guitars, preamplifiers
- Website: sadowsky.com

Sadowsky Guitars is an American manufacturer of electric bass guitars, electric guitars, archtop guitars and instrument preamplifiers. Founded by luthier Roger Sadowsky in 1979, the company operates a custom instrument workshop in Long Island City, Queens, New York City. Sadowsky became known for modifying Fender-style bass guitars with active electronics and later producing instruments of its own design. Since 2019, the company has licensed the manufacturing and distribution of certain bass guitar lines to German instrument manufacturer Warwick, while continuing to operate its New York custom shop.

== History ==
=== Origins and founding ===
Roger Sadowsky began making instruments in 1972 after leaving a doctoral program at Rutgers University to apprentice with acoustic guitar builder Augie LoPrinzi in New Jersey. In 1974 he moved to Medley Music near Philadelphia, where he worked in instrument repair. He returned to New York City in 1979 and opened a workshop repairing and modifying guitars and basses.

Early clients included session bassist Marcus Miller, whose Fender bass Sadowsky modified. The work included active preamplification, available both in instruments and as external equipment. As the price of vintage instruments increased, Sadowsky began producing new bass guitars incorporating features he had developed through repair and modification work. His first bass, built in 1982 for Will Lee, was a four-string instrument with Precision- and Jazz-style pickups.

=== Expansion of instrument production ===
Sadowsky's business expanded from repair and modification into custom bass and guitar building. He made instruments for musicians including Prince and Paul Simon during the 1980s. The company introduced a Will Lee signature bass in 2009.

The company began manufacturing its MetroLine instruments in Japan in 2003. By 2017, the Japanese Metro basses were being produced by a team led by Yoshi Kikuchi, who had trained in Sadowsky's New York workshop. Sadowsky also introduced lower-cost Satin Series instruments built in New York, alongside its custom basses.

The company moved its workshop from Manhattan to Brooklyn in 2002 and then to Long Island City in 2011.

=== Partnership with Warwick ===
In December 2019, Sadowsky and German instrument manufacturer Warwick announced an exclusive licensing and distribution arrangement. Under the agreement, Warwick would manufacture and distribute the Metro and MetroExpress ranges and distribute strings and accessories. The New York custom shop remained independently operated under Roger Sadowsky, producing NYC Custom Shop instruments and guitars. The agreement was a licensing arrangement, rather than the sale of the New York custom shop.

== Instruments and design ==
Sadowsky's early instruments drew on the body shapes and construction of vintage Fender Jazz Bass and Fender Precision Bass instruments, while incorporating active electronics, modified hardware and other changes. The company subsequently offered four- and five-string instruments, different fret configurations and reduced-weight designs. Sadowsky employed chambered bodies in some models to reduce instrument weight.

The New York custom shop has manufactured both solid-body and hollow-body instruments, including electric bass guitars, solid-body electric guitars, archtop guitars and electric nylon-string guitars. Its bass ranges have included the NYC Custom instruments, the Japanese-made Metro series and the Satin Series. The company has also produced an archtop model associated with jazz guitarist Jim Hall.

== Musicians ==
Among the musicians documented as Sadowsky clients or instrument users are bassists Marcus Miller, Will Lee, Verdine White and Jason Newsted, as well as guitarists Jim Hall, Paul Simon and Prince. The company developed a signature bass model for Will Lee, introduced in 2009.

== See also ==
- Warwick (company)
- Aguilar Amplification
