= Caparison Guitars =

Hand made guitar manufacturer

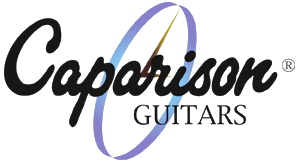
- Industry: Musical instrument
- Founded: 1995; 31 years ago
- Founder: Itaru Kanno
- Headquarters: Japan
- Area served: Asia, Europe, North America
- Key people: Itaru Kanno, Gabriel Ösztreicher
- Products: Electric guitars
- Owner: George and Gabriel Ösztreicher
- Parent: Caparison Guitar Co. Ltd., Cardiff
- Website: caparisonguitars.com

Caparison Guitars is a Japanese-origin manufacturer of electric guitars. The company is headquartered in Japan and is a subsidiary of Caparison Guitar Company Ltd., based in the United Kingdom.

== History ==
The company was established in 1990 with the former Jackson/Charvel Japan design division. The Charvel designers created the CDS Series, CDS II Series, and Questar Series, while the Jackson designed contributed with the Doug Aldrich, Soloist Special, Dinky AXE and Falcon models. Caparison was owned by Kyowa Shokai Ltd, a company that made contracts with factories to produce guitars for them (like Hoshino Gakki).

In May 2011, Shokai was declared bankrupt; however, Caparison resumed production in September 2011 under the ownership of the Caparison Guitar Company Ltd., a company in Cardiff, United Kingdom. The company retained Itaru Kanno (菅野到) as lead designer and the instruments are still manufactured with Iida Corporation in Nagoya, Japan.

== Guitars ==
Their Horus model features a 27-fret neck with clock inlays that shows a different time for each fret position — 1 o'clock on the first fret, 3 o'clock on the third, 5 o'clock on the fifth fret, and so on. TAT Special (Through and Through), and Orbit models also feature 27-fret necks.

Their Dellinger models also feature clock inlays on the fretboard; however, these guitars feature 24-fret necks. Other Caparison Guitar models are the Angelus (including the ACE signature models), Susanoh, Michael Romeo Signature Dellinger Prominence MJR, Joel Stroetzel Signature Dellinger-JSM and Mattias "IA" Eklundh Signature Apple Horn 8. The Orbit has a design that deviates from the 'Flying V' shape by adding a curve at the left of the neck joint and an elongated upper horn.

Caparison design their own humbucking, single coil, and dual-rail humbucking pickups, which are produced by Gotoh Pick Ups located in Nagano, Japan. The dual-rail humbucking pickup fits into the footprint of standard single coil pickup. Caparison also design their own fixed bridge (produced by Gotoh Gut Co., ltd.).
