= Duesenberg Guitars =

German electric string instrument manufacturer

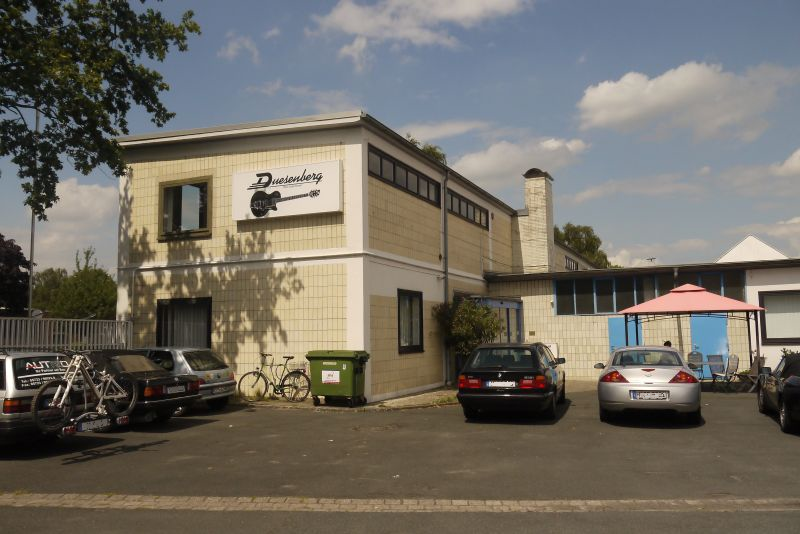
- Headquarters in Hannover
- Type: Brand
- Industry: Musical instrument
- Founded: 1986; 40 years ago
- Founder: Dieter Gölsdorf
- Headquarters: Hannover, Germany
- Area served: Global
- Key people: Dieter Gölsdorf, Ingo Renner
- Products: Electric guitars, basses, amplifiers, effects pedals
- Parent: Göldo Music GmbH
- Website: duesenberg.de

Duesenberg is a brand for electric string instruments founded in 1986 and located in Hannover, Germany. Duesenberg claims most of the production of the guitars is done in Croatia, with the final setup and assembly done in Germany.

Duesenberg is part of Göldo Music GmbH and is known for their Art Deco designs. In 2004, the company opened a branch in Fullerton, California.

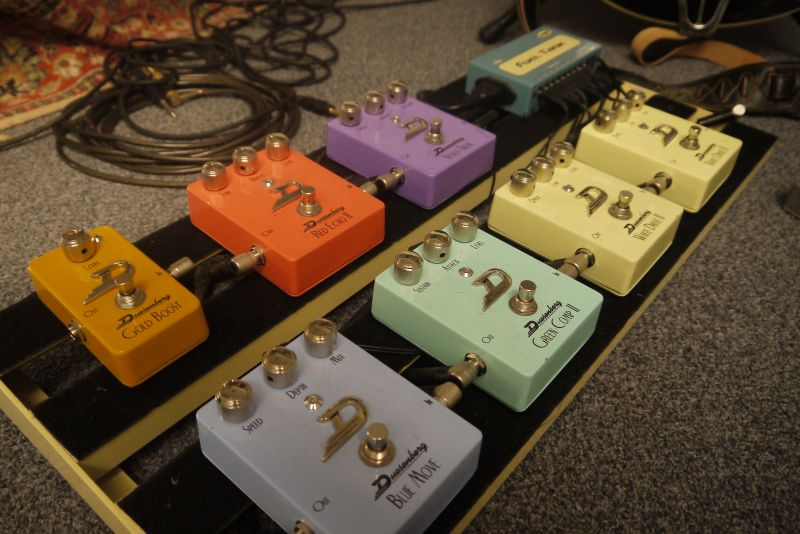
Duesenberg effect pedals

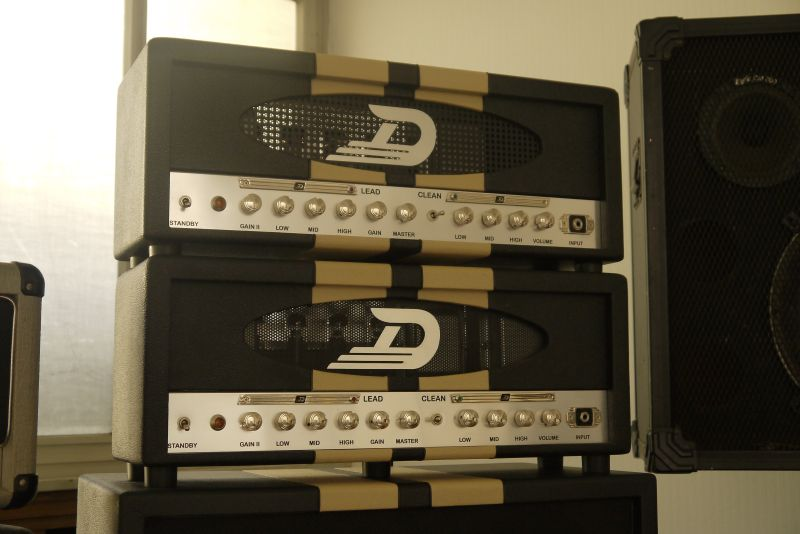
Duesenberg Amplifier Doozy II

Besides its electric guitars and basses, such as its most successful model, the Starplayer TV, the company produces high-end music equipment like amplifiers, effects pedals, and pickups.

Most of the instruments are semi-hollow constructions.

== History ==
Duesenberg was originally a brand for futuristic heavy metal guitars, until 1989.

Since 1991, Dieter Gölsdorf uses the brand within his company, Göldo Music GmbH, in Hannover, Germany.

In 1995, Gölsdorf developed a guitar called the Starplayer, which would be the predecessor of its most popular model, the Starplayer TV. The Duesenberg brand was used again for these instruments.

In 2004, the company opened a branch in Fullerton, California. The company moved from the city center to the outskirts of Hannover in 2011.

== Gallery ==
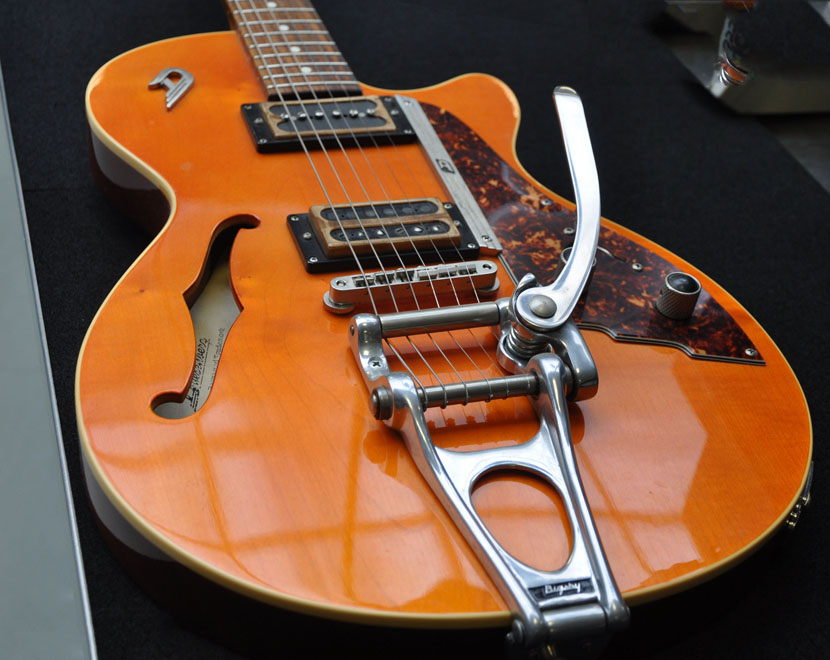
First model of the Starplayer Series

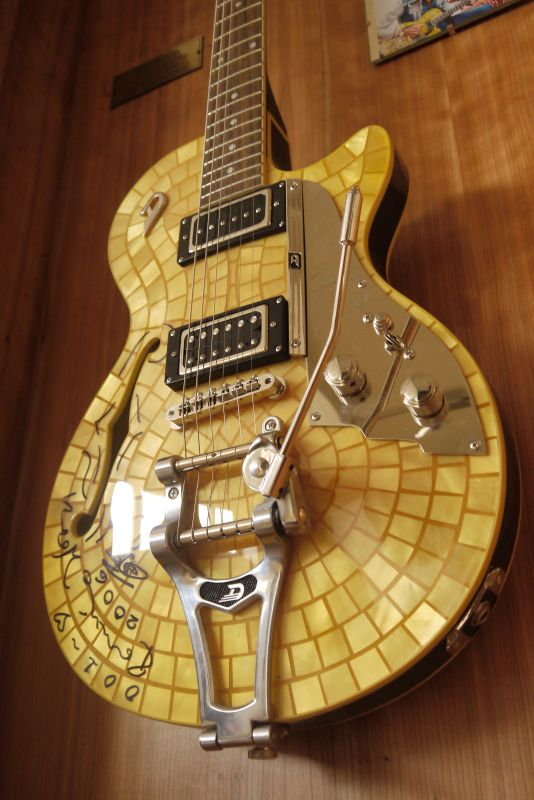
Starplayer TV Ron Wood

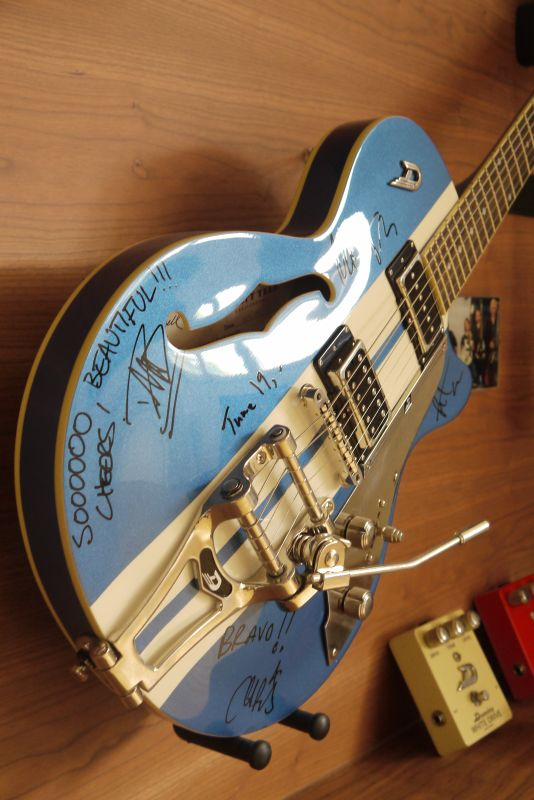
Starplayer TV Mike Campbell

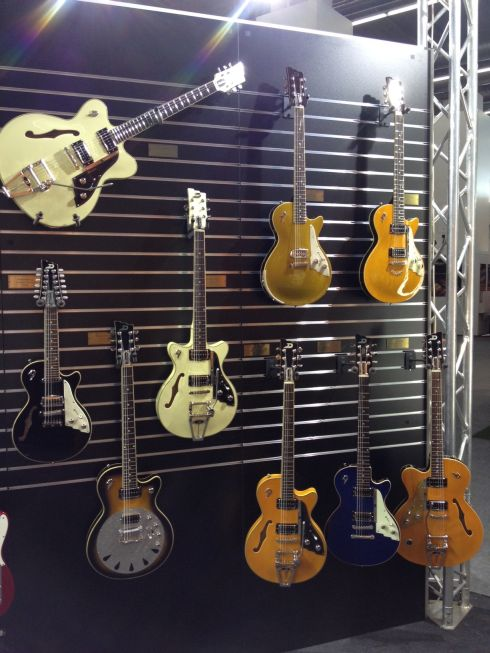
Duesenberg booth at the Frankfurter Musikmesse 2012

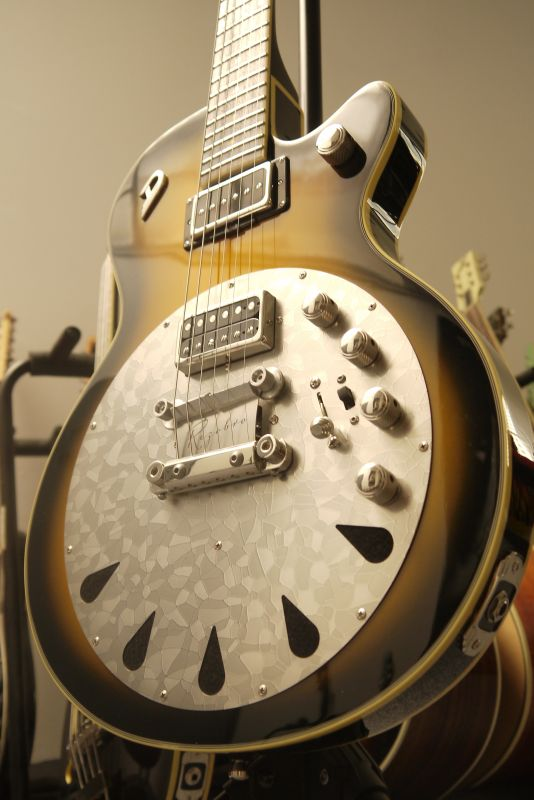
Rezobro in 2-Tone-Sunburst

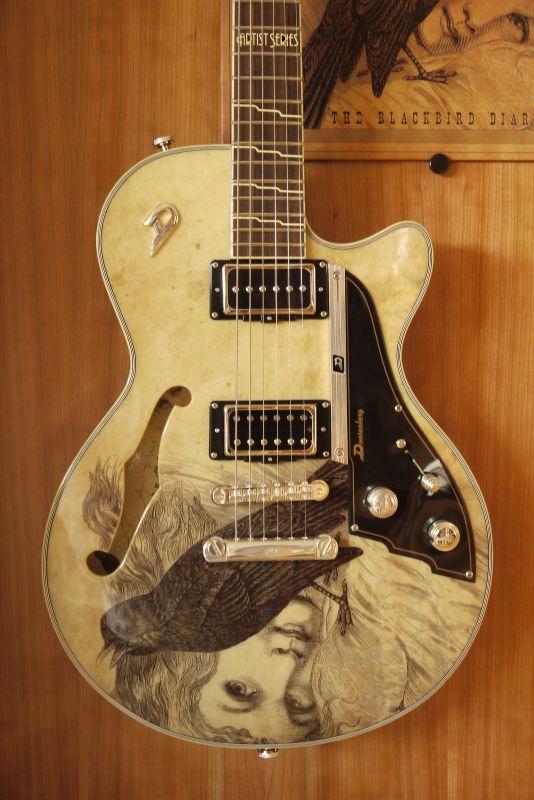
Dave Stewart Artist Series Blackbird

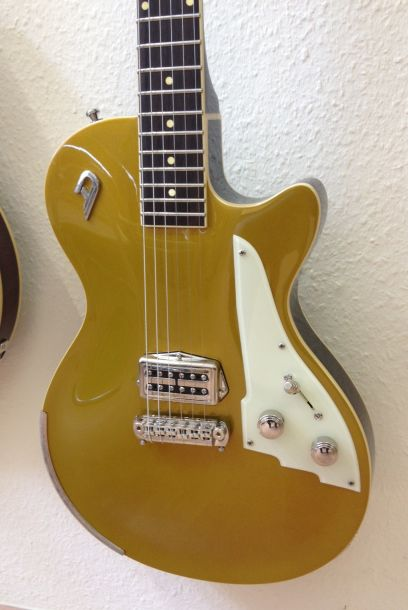
Model 52 Little Toaster
