= Cort Guitars =

South Korean guitar manufacturer

Cort Guitars (Cor-Tek Corporation)
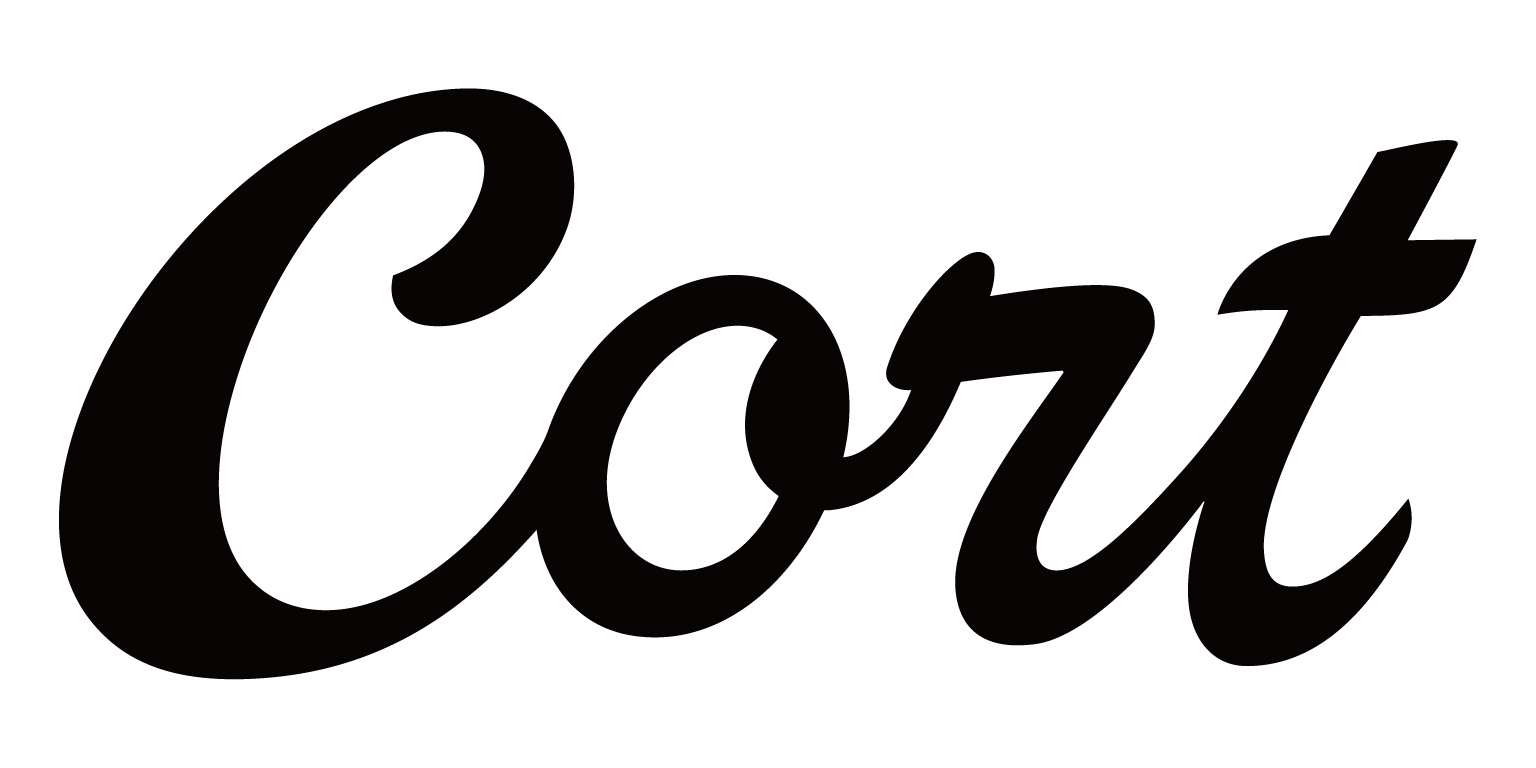
- Company type: Private
- Industry: Musical instruments
- Founded: 1973; 53 years ago (as "Yoo-Ah company")
- Founder: Jung-gyu Park
- Headquarters: Seoul, South Korea
- Area served: Worldwide
- Key people: Young-ho Park (CEO)
- Products: Electric and acoustic guitars, basses, ukuleles
- Website: cortguitars.com

Cort Guitars (Cor-Tek Corporation) is a South Korean guitar manufacturing company located in Seoul. The company is one of the largest guitar makers in the world, and produces instruments for many other companies. It also has factories in Indonesia and China.

Products manufactured by Cort include electric, acoustic and classical guitars, basses, and ukuleles.

== History ==
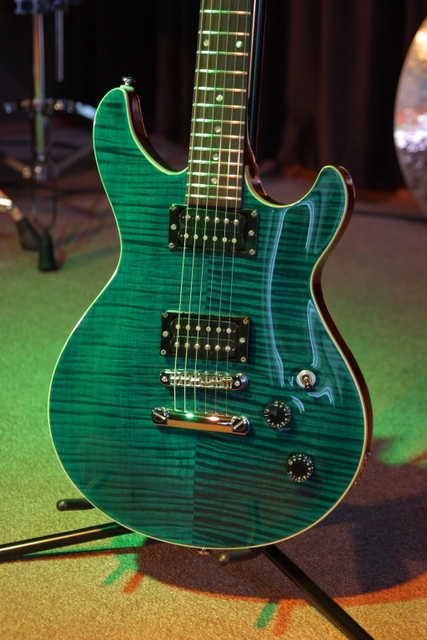
M600, green flamed maple

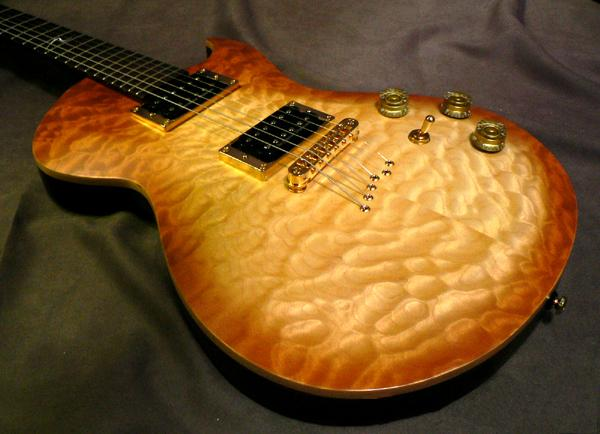
Z-Custom Open Pore Natural Burst, from Zenox Series

Cort was founded in 1960 as an importer of pianos by Jung-gyu Park, father of current CEO Young-ho Park. At that time, the company was called Soo Doh Piano. The business slowly evolved from a piano importer to a manufacturer and sales division, then finally into a guitar manufacturer in 1973. At this early stage of the company's history, Soo Doh Piano was strictly an OEM supplier to other foreign brand name companies. The company eventually changed its name to Cort Musical Instruments, focused on guitars as it became much more proficient at it than producing pianos and released the first Cort-branded guitars in 1982. Cort began production of headless guitars in 1984 with designs exclusively licensed from Ned Steinberger for Cort's own brand as well as for brands like Hohner and Kramer. This development helped bring the Cort name to the mainstream electric guitar market and attracted the attention of other well-known brand name companies seeking contract guitar manufacturers in Korea.

== Models ==
Cort does not have a specific model of guitar that could be called its “signature”, like the Stratocaster for Fender or the Les Paul for Gibson. Instead, Cort produces a wide variety of electric guitars, acoustic guitars, acoustic bass guitars, and electric basses.

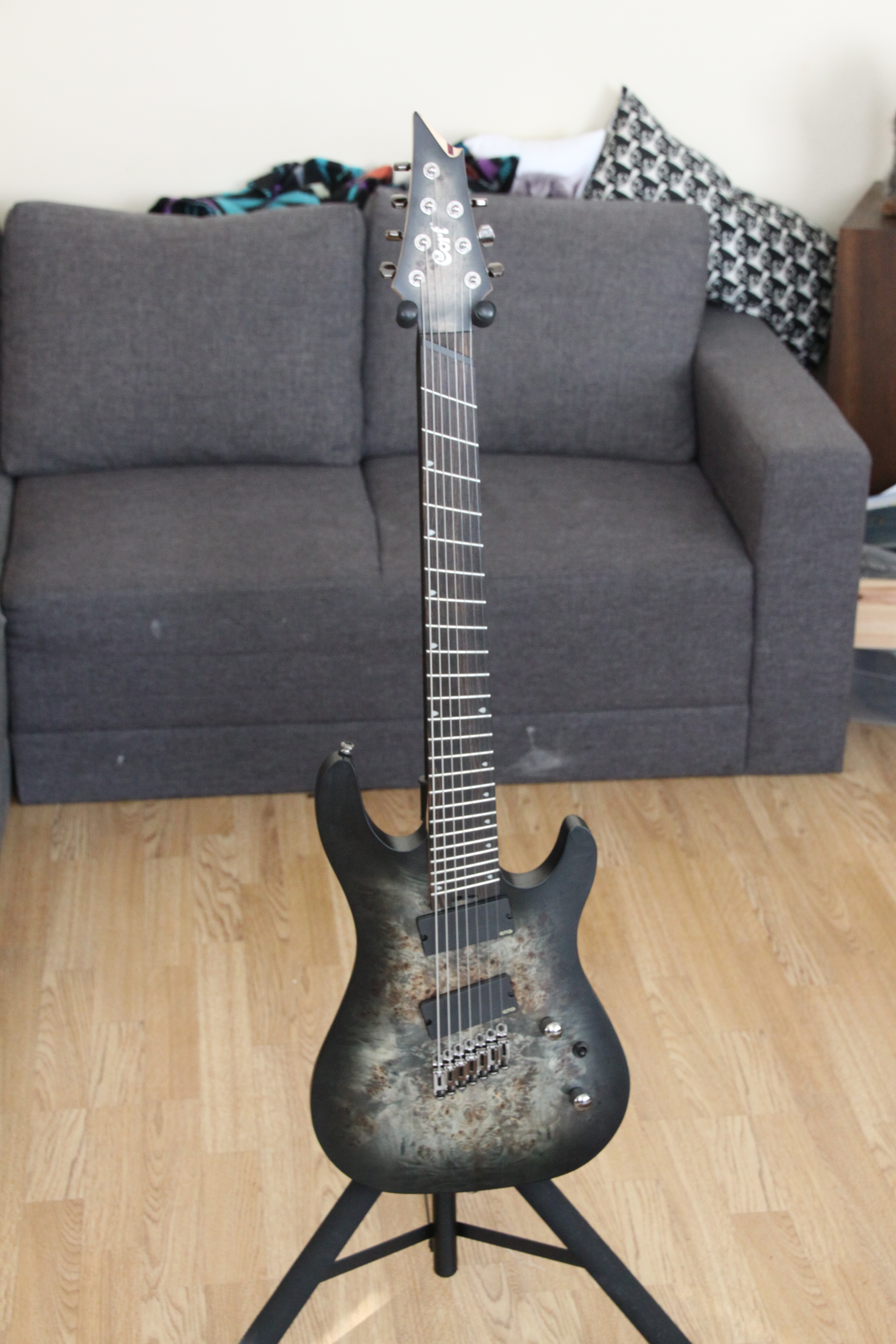
Cort KX500MS Star Dust Green -fanned fret / multi-scale -7-string electric guitar with EMG-pickups.

=== Electrics ===
- Aero
- Classic Rock
- EVL
- Performer
- G
- Gene Simmons
- Hollowbody
- Ibanez
- Sterling
- Sunset
- Master8R
- KX series
- M series
- Signature
- Solo
- Viva
- VX
- X
- Zenon
- Zenox
- CR

=== Acoustics ===
- Gold
- Limited Edition
- Earth
- Core
- SFX
- CJ
- MR
- Classical
- Standard
- Bass
- S (90's)
- Jade
- Luce
- NDX
- Bluegrass

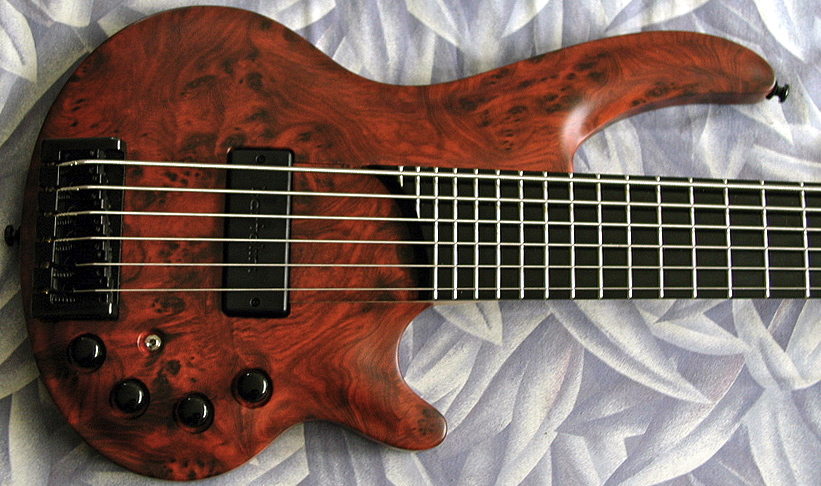
Cort Curbow 6-string bass

=== Basses ===
- GB
- Artisan
- Curbow
- Action
- Arona
- Gene Simmons Axe
- Gene Simmons Punisher

In addition to the models currently being made, Cort has produced many others, including the "S" series guitars (Stellar, Sterling, Starlite), the "Viva" guitars, "MGM" (Matt Guitar Murphy), "Freedom" bass (Billy Cox), Neil Zaza, Larry Coryell, "Elrick" bass, "J Triggs" (Jim Triggs), "Katana", and "Effector".

=== Parkwood ===
Up until 2006, Cort manufactured a line of high quality guitars under the name 'Cort Parkwood'. In 2006, Cort turned Parkwood into a brand of its own and now does not feature the Cort name or logo. This is a brand sold exclusively through big box stores such as Guitar Center. Cort continues to manufacture the Parkwood brand in South Korea although it is printed "Handcrafted in China" inside the guitar body. The Hybrid series is made in Indonesia.

=== Masterpiece (MMP) Series electric guitars ===
The Cort M-Series is as close to a signature shape as Cort gets across its range. Cort has released a limited production run of MMP series electric guitars from its own custom shop. Somewhere between 25 and 50 of each MMP model were released. These guitars are generally highly regarded and appear to be heavily influenced by higher-end PRS models, in both quality standards and style.

=== Contract production ===
Cort's main production focus is not on Cort-brand guitars, but rather contract work for numerous other companies. Generally, large companies contract Cort to build lower-priced guitars that have that company's brand on them. Ibanez, PRS (SE line), Squier, and G&L Tribute series line of guitars are among the most well-known brands that Cort produces.

== Controversy ==
Since 1997 controversy has surrounded Korean factories of Cort and Cor-Tek due to its alleged mistreatment of factory workers. Grievances include the closing of its Daejon factory with no advance warning on April 9, 2007, mass redundancies of all staff from its Incheon plant on April 12, 2007, and the firing and mistreatment of union officials and members.

On July 12, 2007, a Cort worker set himself on fire in protest, and on October 15, 2008, workers conducted a 30-day hunger strike and sit-in occupation on a 40-meter electricity tower. Rage Against the Machine guitarist Tom Morello and System of a Down frontman Serj Tankian - both partners in the Axis of Justice - joined representatives of the Cort workers in a protest concert against Cort and Cor-tek on January 13, 2010, at the Nanum Cultural Center in Los Angeles. Morello said "I fully support the Korean workers' demands for justice in the workplace. All American guitar manufacturers and the people that play them should hold Cort accountable for the awful way they have treated their workers."

This controversy went through various legal stages in Korea from 2007 through 2012. Ultimately, Cort received favorable decisions from the Supreme Court in Korea that ended any further liability on Cort's part to the terminated employees. The court ruled that the closure of the plant in 2008 and subsequent layoff were justified.

Investigations into issues of widespread corruption and abuse led to the impeachment of president Park Geun-hye and the arrest of Supreme Court Justice Yang Sung-tae, who had ruled in the Cort labour dispute. These led in 2019 to apologies from Cort and honorary reinstatements of the workers who were laid off in 2007.
