= Danelectro Shorthorn =

Line of guitars

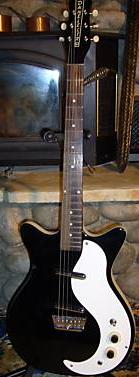
- Manufacturer: Danelectro
- Period: Original: 1959 to 1969, Reissued in the Late-1990s, 2007 and 2009-10. In current production as model '59M NOS.

Construction
- Body type: Hardboard (Masonite) top and bottom with plywood frame;hollow body.
- Neck joint: Bolt-on
- Scale: 25"

Woods
- Body: Original models: Masonite
- Neck: Original models: Poplar
- Fretboard: Rosewood, 21 frets.

Hardware
- Bridge: Chrome-Plated steel with adjustable rosewood saddle
- Pickup(s): Lipstick pickups. (Original style brass tube with chrome plating.) Current (2014) model features NOS Lipstick pickups manufactured in 1999. 59MJ ['59M NOS with metal flake finish]:

The Danelectro Shorthorn line of guitars is a dual cutaway hollow bodied design, made of Masonite and poplar. The original models were introduced in 1959 to replace the U model guitars, and were in production until the closure of the Danelectro company in 1969.

There have been multiple re-issues of this line of guitars, the first two being the 59DC with two pickups and DC-3 with three pickups, sold between 1998 and 2001. The 59 Dano followed in 2007 and the 59-DC in 2009.

The Shorthorn range comes in one, two and three pickup models, and has the "Coke Bottle Style" classic headstock, hollowed body cavity, and a seal shaped pickguard with two concentric "stacked" tone/volume knobs. The second reissue series (2007-2009) was Chinese-made, with an asymmetric headstock and standard, non-stacked master tone and volume knobs.

In 2014, Danelectro announced several improvements for its latest iteration, the '59M NOS. Manufacturing returns to Korea for the new model, along with stacked concentric knobs and the original headstock profile. Featured hardware in some models includes tuneable die-cast bridge and NOS "Lipstick" pickups manufactured in 1999.

== Danelectro Convertible ==
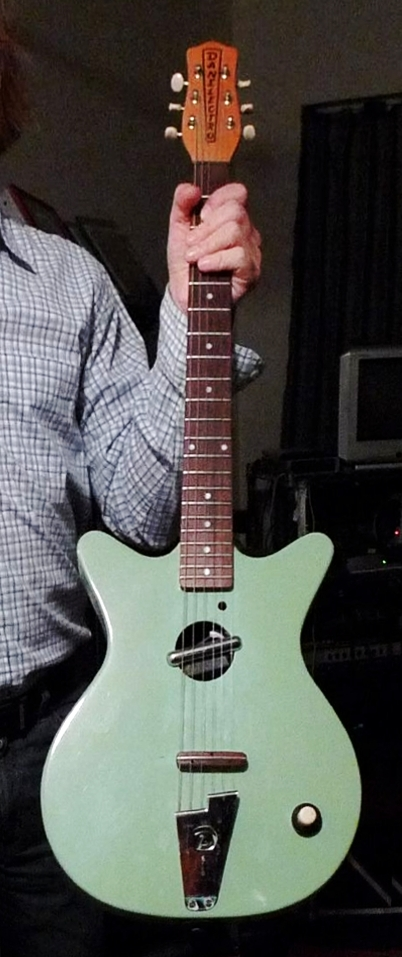
Danelectro Convertible reissue

The Danelectro Convertible was a hollow-bodied thinline acoustic/electric guitar based on the Shorthorn. It had a conventional round sound hole with a lipstick pickup mounted across the hole. The Convertible name came from the ability to play it unplugged as an acoustic guitar or plugged in as an electric guitar. The Convertible has the double cutaway shape used on Danelectro's DC series of guitars.

The Convertible was originally produced in the 1960s. It was offered as a reissue between 1998 and 2001. The guitar is currently being reissued. The reissues differ from the originals in that they have mounted the pickup diagonally across the soundhole, and there is only one concentric knob as opposed to two separate tone and volume knobs. The reissues also have a cable jack located in the strap knob.

The Convertible had a floating bridge and a separate tailpiece. On the Convertible, the tailpiece was used to hold the strings equally apart while the metal riser on the bridge was not notched, with the undesirable result that the strings slid back & forth on the bridge when the guitarist bent strings while playing.

== Manny's demonstration guitar ==
One noteworthy Danelectro 59 DC resides at Sam Ash Music (formerly the famed Manny's Music store) on West 48th Street in New York City. The guitar had been painted a light yellow, along with other brightly painted instruments, for a promotional photo; afterward the guitar served as the official demo model for customers to try out amplifiers or effects pedals. Consequently, "The Yellow Danelectro" has been played by dozens of well-known and notable guitarists - including Bob Dylan, John Lennon, Mark Knopfler, Eric Clapton, and others - who enjoyed the sound of the guitar to the point that some attempted to buy the not-for-sale guitar. The guitar, which eventually broke in half at the neck, is displayed in a glass case at Sam Ash, together with the unverifiable claim that it may have been played by more musicians than any other electric guitar.

== Notable players ==
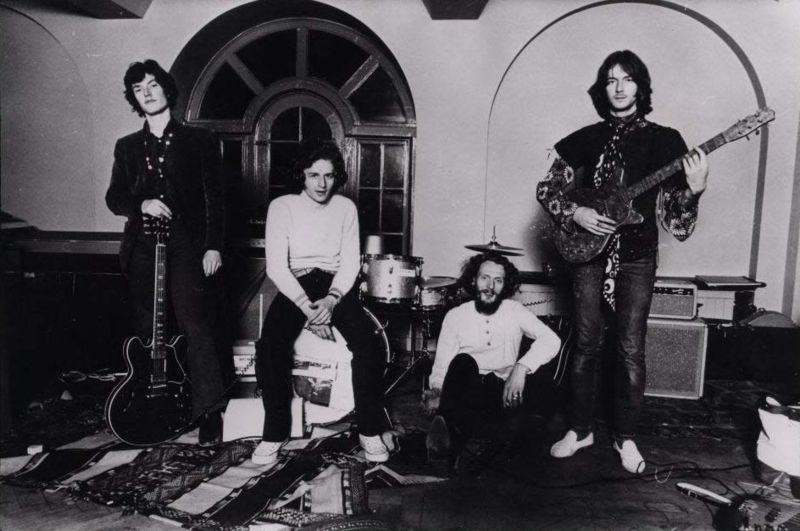
Eric Clapton (far right) holding his Danelectro Shorthorn guitar while posing with the other members of Blind Faith in 1969.

Syd Barrett, frontman of the early Pink Floyd, usually played this guitar before switching to a Fender Esquire. Also Jimmy Page of Led Zeppelin used this model of guitar on live performances in 1975 at Earl's Court and from 1979 to 1980 for "Kashmir", "In My Time of Dying", "Black Mountain Side", and "White Summer". When Eric Clapton was with Blind Faith he used this model with a psychedelic paint job. Before he played bass and sang lead for Chicago, Peter Cetera bought a Danelectro to be his very first bass guitar in the early 1960s.

Also see: List of Danelectro players
