= Danelectro Amp-in-case =

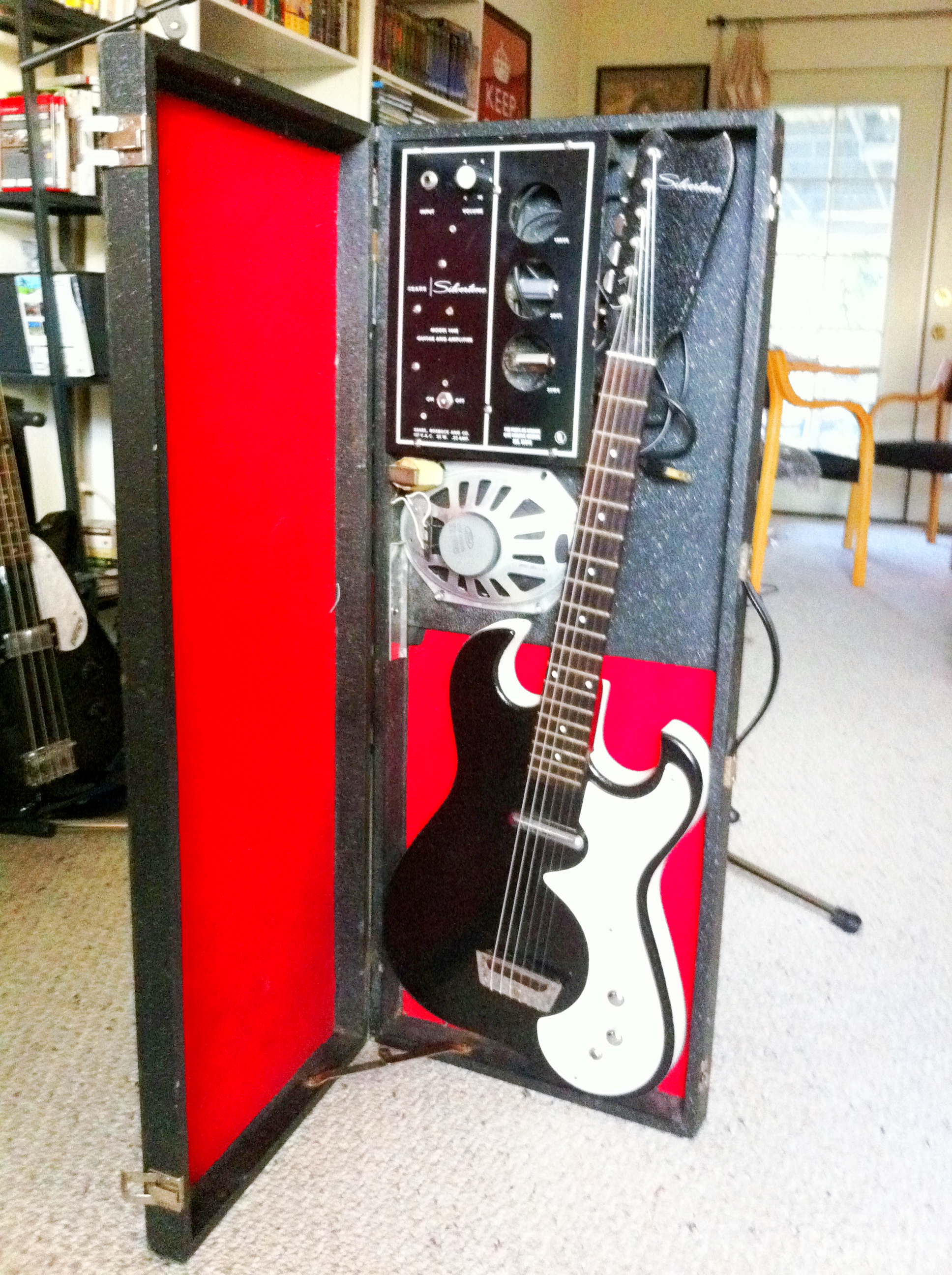
- 1962 Silvertone 1448 Amp-in-case by Danelectro
- Manufacturer: Danelectro
- Period: Original: 1962-1968/Reissue: 2008

Construction
- Body type: masonite top and bottom with plywood frame;hollow body.
- Neck joint: Bolt-on

Woods
- Body: Ply & Poplar
- Neck: Maple, Original: 21.0" scale/Reissue: 25.0" sca
- Fretboard: Rosewood, Original: 17 frets/Reissue: 19 frets

Hardware
- Pickup: Original: 1 or 2 Lipstick pickups/Reissue: 2 pickups (Original style brass tube with chrome plating.)

The Danelectro Amp-In-Case, properly known as a semi-hollow body due to its Masonite top and back, with pine outer structure. "All-in-one" Amplifier-Case or Silvertone 1448/1449/1451/1452/1457 is a line of guitar sets introduced from 1962 to 1968. It was sold for US$67.95 (equivalent to approximately $724 in 2025), sometimes including a 45 rpm how-to-play record, as part of Sears Silvertone. It was later reissued in 2008 in modified form as the "Dano '63" without the amp-in-case. The Dano '63 was also available as a baritone guitar and a long- and short-scale bass guitar.

== Amplifier ==
The amplifier is built into the top-half of the hard-shell guitar case. The first one, the 1448 series, was a simple 3-watt amplifier with 2 tubes plus 1 tube rectifier, 5-inch speaker, and gain control. In 1963, the 1449 series (later renamed 1457) was released, with a 5-watt amplifier with 3 tubes (and 1 tube rectifier) amplifier, with 8-inch speakers, gain, tone, tremolo (speed and strength), 2 inputs, and one foot-switch. The front end of the case has its top half covered in cloth for the speaker. In 1966, the amp-in-case comes with both the non-tremolo version 1451 (modified from 1448) and tremolo version 1452 (modified from 1449). Electronically they are identical, but the speakers are moved to the opposite lid.

The case dimensions were approximately 37 by 15 by 3 inches (940 mm × 381 mm × 76 mm). When the guitar is stored inside the case, with the speaker cloth facing upward, the guitar neck would sit on the left side of the amplifier.

== Guitar ==
When first introduced in 1962, the 3/4-sized guitar had a double cutaway semi-hollow body in a shape similar to the well known Fender Stratocaster. The body was composed of a poplar center block and frame with Masonite top and back. It came with a single lipstick pickup at the "middle" position, controlled by a volume and tone knob. The poplar neck was fitted with a Brazilian rosewood fingerboard, and only had 18 frets. The neck connected to the body with three bolts.

By Fall of 1963, there was a two pickup model available. The new model 1449 was the same as its predecessor, but equipped with 2 lipstick pickups and a 21 fret neck. Eventually the semi-hollow guitar models were replaced with solid-body design similar to Danelectro's Dane line.

== Reissue ==
The guitar, minus the amp-in-case, was reissued by Evets Corporation for 2008 as the Dano '63. It is not an exact copy, but updated with modern materials and construction methods. From 1999 to 2002, Evets Corp. also marketed an "Amp-in-Bag" gig bag accessory for its line of Danelectro retro-design reissue guitars. It featured a small plastic battery-powered transistor amp in a clear plastic sleeve attached to the gig bag.

Specifications:

- Body material/construction: Masonite with plywood core. Solid plywood block from neck pocket to bridge. Chambered sides and behind bridge.
- Neck material: Maple with double acting truss rod
- Neck shape: C
- Neck joint: Bolt on
- Scale: 25"
- Number of frets: 19
- Nut width: 1.650”
- Fretboard: Rosewood with pearloid inlays
- Fretboard radius: 14”
- Tuners: High ratio with sealed gears
- Strings: 10–46
- Bridge: Adjustable saddles zero gloss nickel
- Pickups: Lipstick single coil
- Controls: Single volume and tone w/ 3-way toggle pickup selector
- Vinyl side binding tape. Stained for aged appearance.

The Dano '63 was also available as a long- and short-scale bass and a baritone guitar.

The Amp-in-case amplifier has been redesigned and reissued in an amp head form by Fritz Brothers Guitars in Mendocino County, California. This new take on the original amp does not include the speaker, but can be run into a separate speaker cabinet, or through a larger PA system instead. It is primarily marketed to fit in a typical American hardshell Stratocaster style guitar case, but it can be custom-built to fit other cases.

== Reception ==
The Dano '63 Baritone was reviewed by several guitar magazines, and was well received. Guitar Player praised its clarity and tone and Guitarist magazine awarded it as a "Guitarist Choice." In the May 2008 issue of Guitarist magazine, both of the Dano '63 basses were favorably reviewed, with the long scale being chosen as a "Guitarist Choice." A bassist and a music journalist from Poland, Adam Pawlowski, noticed that the unmodified Dano '63 Baritone equipped with Ernie Ball 2837 strings' set is nothing else than the famous Danelectro's six-string bass tuned E-E, one octave below the guitar. That's because of its 29-5/8" scale.

== Notable players ==
Famous musicians such as Mac Demarco, Beck, Cat Power, Daniel Rossen of Grizzly Bear, Jeremy Earl of Woods, Cody Blanchard (of Shannon and The Clams), and Dexter Romweber (of Flat Duo Jets and the Dex Romweber Duo), have made use of the Amp-in-case model live on stage, and Dave Grohl and Sammy Hagar both owned one as children. Jimi Hendrix owned a 1956 Silvertone Danelectro. It was a single-pickup U-1, single cutaway solid body with the distinictive “Coke bottle” headstock. Hendrix named it “Betty Jean" after a girlfriend, Betty Jean Morgan. This Silvertone would become his longest-serving guitar. Furthermore, the Amp-in-case 1448 was Michael McDonald's first serious guitar; he received it as a Christmas present from his grandmother in 1962.
