= Nobody Knows Me (disambiguation) =

"Nobody Knows Me" is a B-side by Madonna

Nobody Knows Me may also refer to:

== Music ==
- Nobody Knows Me, an album by Utah Philips 1961
- Nobody Knows Me, an album by Martin Gerschwitz 2000
- "Nobody Knows Me", a B-side to the 1990 Lyle Lovett song "Here I Am"
- "Nobody Knows Me" (Mick Greenwood song), 1972
- "Nobody Knows Me", a song by Danelectro player Richard Barone from Clouds Over Eden album
