= Electric sitar =

Musical instrument

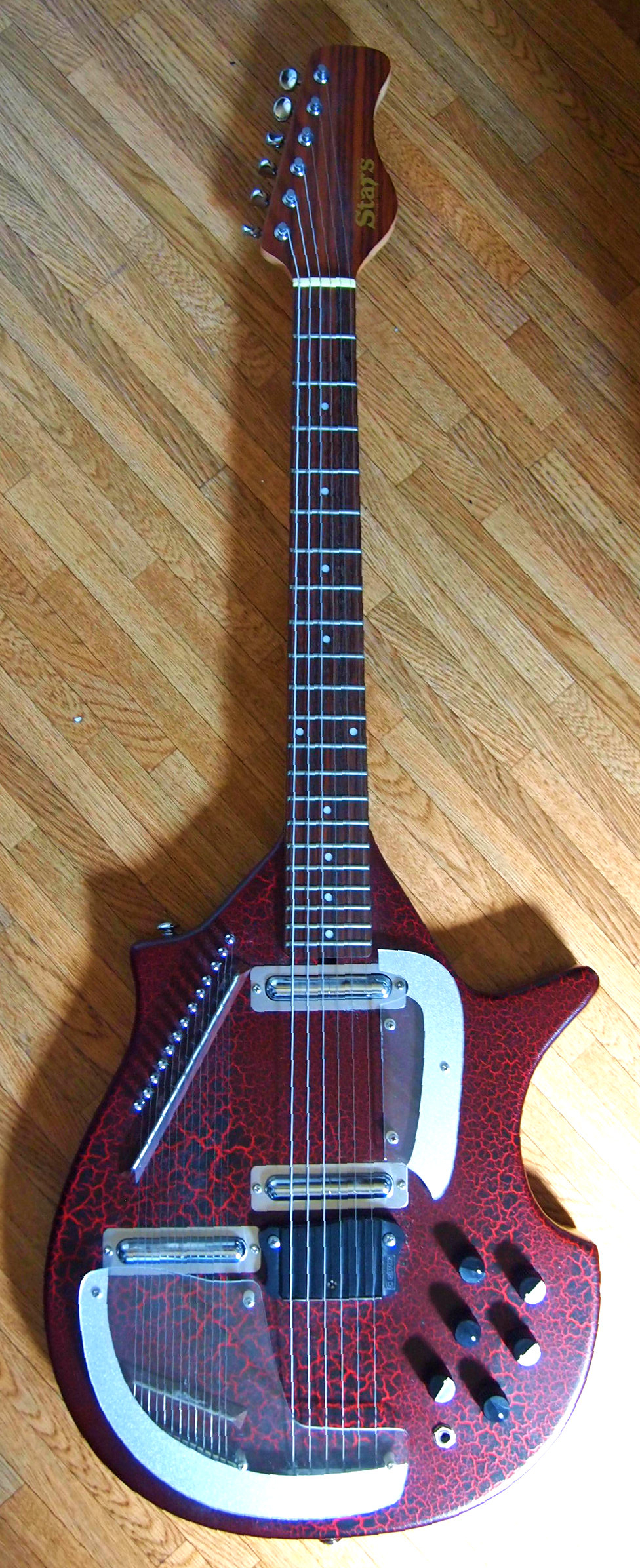
Star's Electric Sitar, a copy of Coral/Danelectro Electric Sitar 3S19

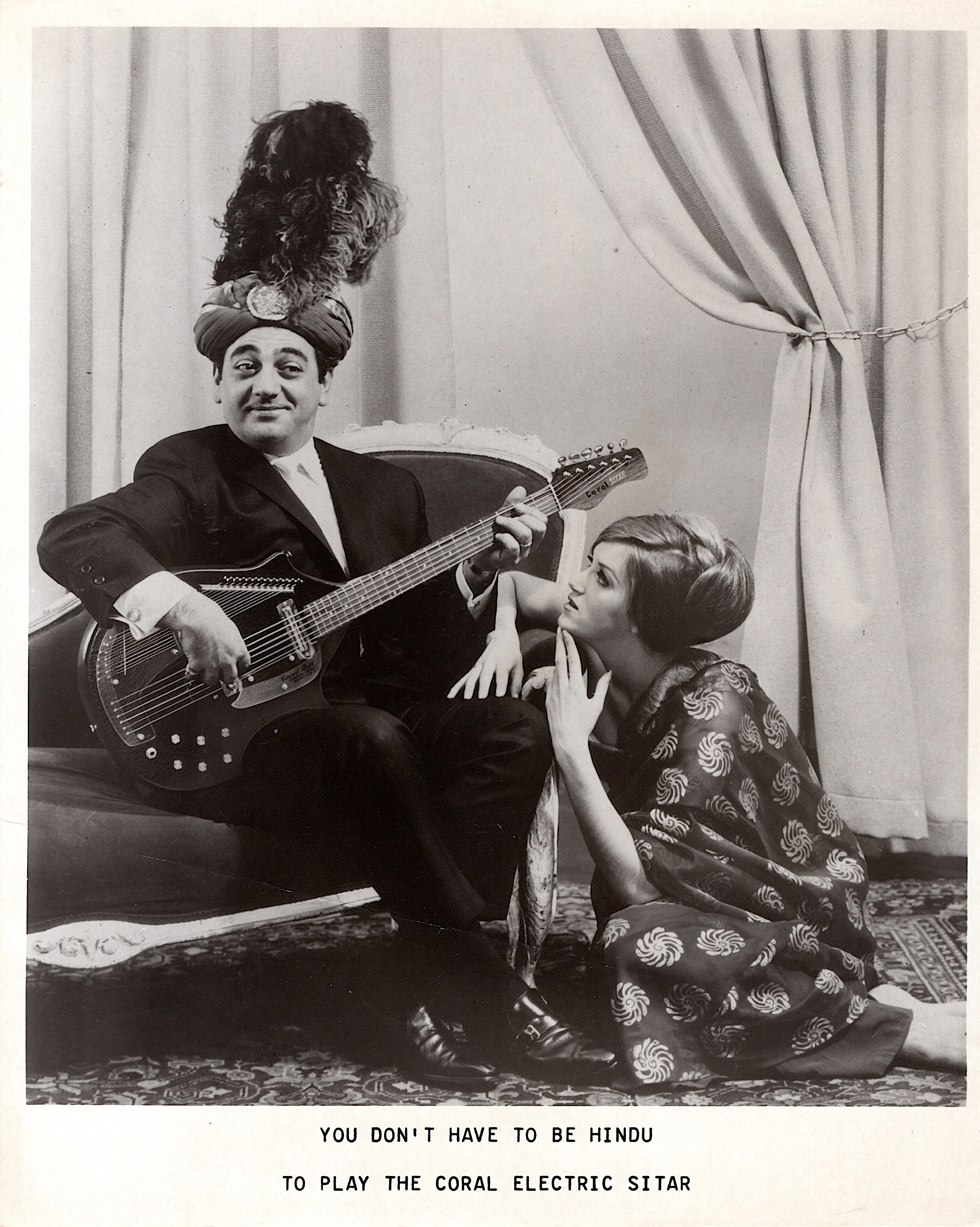
Danelectro company promotional photo of Coral Electric Sitar co-creator Vincent Bell.

An electric sitar is a type of electric string instrument designed to mimic the sound of the sitar, a traditional musical instrument of India. Depending on the manufacturer and model, these instruments bear varying degrees of resemblance to the traditional sitar. Most resemble the electric guitar in the style of the body and headstock, though some have a body shaped to resemble that of the sitar (such as a model made by Danelectro).

== History ==
The instrument was developed in the early 1960s by session guitarist Vinnie Bell in partnership with Danelectro and released under the brandname Coral™ in 1967. At the time, many western musical groups had begun using the sitar, which is generally considered a difficult instrument to learn. By contrast, the electric sitar, with its standard guitar fretboard and tuning, is a more familiar fret arrangement for a guitarist to play. The twangy sitar-like tone comes from a carefully designed and contoured bridge surface adding the necessary buzz to the guitar strings.

== Configuration ==
In addition to the six playing strings, most electric sitars have sympathetic strings, typically located on the left side of the instrument (though some do not have these). These strings have their own pickups (typically lipstick pickups are used for both sets of strings), and are usually tuned with a harp wrench (a difficult process). A unique type of bridge, a "buzz bridge", developed by Vinnie Bell, helps give the instrument its distinctive sound. Some electric sitars have drone strings in lieu of sympathetic strings. A few models, such as the Jerry Jones "Baby" sitar, lack both sympathetic and drone strings, while still retaining the distinctive buzz bridge.

The "sympathetic" strings on most electric sitars do not resonate strongly enough to match the effect of an acoustic sitar. There are resonant chambers in the solid-body instruments that have Masonite tops, however it is not enough to excite the 13 strings into true sympathy. The strings are tensioned over two rosewood bridges with fret material as saddles so the sound is more like an autoharp than a sitar.

Versions of the electric sitar were also developed mainly in India. These are smaller-sized sitars that resemble a traditional sitar, and are tuned the same way.

== Usage ==
Because the tonal quality and playing technique differ significantly from that of the sitar, the electric sitar is typically used in rock, jazz, and fusion styles.

=== 1960s ===
Notable early hit singles featuring electric sitar include Eric Burdon and the Animals' "Monterey", Joe South's "Games People Play", the Supremes' "No Matter What Sign You Are" (on which the electric sitar was played by Eddie Willis), B. J. Thomas' "Hooked on a Feeling" (played by Reggie Young), and the Box Tops' "Cry Like a Baby", as well as some sides by the Stylistics and the Delfonics.

Other recordings from the 1960s include:

- The Cyrkle on "Turn-Down Day"
- Elvis Presley, in his 1969 American Sound recording sessions ("Stranger In My Hometown", "You'll Think Of Me", "Gentle on My Mind", and "I’m Movin' On"), played by Reggie Young; and 1970 Nashville recording sessions ("Snowbird"), played by Harold Bradley.
- Steppenwolf ("Snowblind Friend", played by producer Richard Podolor)
- On his award-winning 1969 instrumental rendition of the Joe South tune "Games People Play", saxophonist King Curtis teamed with guitarist Duane Allman on the electric sitar (Allman also played slide guitar). This recording was included on the Allman compilation An Anthology.
- Hour Glass "Norwegian Wood (This Bird Has Flown)"
- Barry Goldberg 1969 cover of "Hey Jude"
- The Grass Roots "Glory Bound"
- Peggy Scott and Jo Jo Benson ("Soulshake")
- Ronnie Wood (mainly on Rolling Stones live performances of songs where Brian Jones played an actual sitar).

=== 1970s ===
- The Spinners (in "It's a Shame")
- Stevie Wonder (in "Signed, Sealed, Delivered")
- Redbone (in "Come and Get Your Love")
- Bo Donaldson and The Heywoods (in "Who Do You Think You Are?")
- Roy Wood (on the songs "Open up said the World at the Door" by The Move and Wizzard's "Carlsberg Special").
- The Beach Boys (in "All I Wanna Do")
- Steely Dan (in "Do It Again", "Bad Sneakers", and "Throw Back the Little Ones")
- The 1971 album Somethin' Else recorded by Danny Davis and the Nashville Brass prominently featured an electric sitar, a first for the country music industry. The instrument provided accompaniment on such songs as "Snowbird", "Rose Garden", "Are You from Dixie?", and others.
- Harry Chapin, on "Cat's in the Cradle"
- Todd Rundgren (on the album Initiation)
- Genesis (in "I Know What I Like (In Your Wardrobe)", "Dancing with the Moonlit Knight")
- Led Zeppelin (on "Ten Years Gone")
- Yes (in "Close To The Edge", "Siberian Khatru", Tales from Topographic Oceans, "To Be Over", "Into The Lens"); Steve Howe has also used it on his solo albums.
- The Clash (in "Armagideon Time" and "Charlie Don't Surf")
- Eddie Van Halen (on "Ain't Talkin' 'bout Love" and "Primary")
- Rory Gallagher (in "Philby")
- Gary Wilson, on the 1977 album You Think You Really Know Me.
- In ABBA's 1979 song "I Have a Dream" the refrain is played on an electric sitar.
- Tatsuro Yamashita (on "Candy", "Umbrella", "Rainy Day", "Your Eyes", "Blue Midnight", "Get Back in Love", "Endless Game" and "Stand in the Light")

=== 1980s ===
- Robbie Dupree ("Steal Away")
- George Duke and Stanley Clarke ("Sweet Baby")
- Cliff Richard ("Summer Rain", played by Alan Tarney)
- Dan Fogelberg (in "Nexus")
- Mike Oldfield, in "Flying Start" (on Islands)
- Spinal Tap (on "(Listen To The) Flower People")
- Redd Kross (in "Play My Song")
- Paul Young (in "Everytime You Go Away")
- Tom Petty (in "Don't Come Around Here No More")
- The Cure (1963 Coral sitar on "If Only Tonight We Could Sleep" and "Where the Birds Always Sing")
- The Mission (on "Beyond the Pale", "Hymn (For America)", "Sea Of Love", and "Deliverance")

=== 1990s ===
- Guns N' Roses (in "Pretty Tied Up")
- Lenny Kravitz ("It Ain't Over 'til It's Over" and "Again")
- Dinosaur Jr. (in "The Wagon")
- Metallica (in "Wherever I May Roam")
- Pearl Jam (in "Who You Are")
- Screaming Trees in "Halo of Ashes"
- Alice in Chains (in "What the Hell Have I")
- Ugly Kid Joe (in "Cats in the Cradle")
- Manic Street Preachers (in "Tsunami" and "I'm Not Working")
- Steve Vai (notably on "For the Love of God" and also the Frank Zappa composition "Sinister Footwear II")
- Brian Wilson's Imagination features electric sitar on "Sunshine" and "Happy Days" and played by Brent Rowan.

=== 2000s ===
- Ween (on "Flutes of Chi", "Transdermal Celebration", "Tried and True" and "Sweetheart in the Summer")
- The All-American Rejects (in "Night Drive")
- Blues musician Buddy Guy played, among other guitars, a Coral electric sitar in shows on his 2010 tour. He used an electric sitar on two songs off his 2008 album Skin Deep, the Playing for Change re-recording of the title track and the Beatles cover "I've Got a Feeling" from his 2022 studio album The Blues Don't Lie.
- Glass Hammer guitarist Kamran Alan Shikoh performed electric sitar in the band's songs from 2009 to his departure in 2018.

=== 2010s ===
- MGMT, on the 2010 album Congratulations, where the electric sitar was played on many tracks by lead singer and guitarist Andrew VanWyngarden.
- Harry Styles, in "Sunflower, Vol. 6" (on Fine Line)
- D'Angelo, on the 2014 album Black Messiah, on songs including "Another Life" and "The Charade".
- Unknown Mortal Orchestra, in the 2015 song "Multi-Love" (played by Ruban Nielson)
- Scott Henderson, on the 2015 album Vibe Station

== See also ==
- Danelectro
- Electric mandolin
- Electric upright bass
- Electric violin
- Sitar in jazz
- Sitar in popular music
