= Danelectro C =

First instruments designed by Danelectro

- Manufacturer: Danelectro
- Period: 1954 - 1955

Construction
- Body type: Solid
- Neck joint: Bolt on
- Scale: 25.5"

Woods
- Body: Maple, Ash
- Neck: Maple
- Fretboard: Rosewood

Hardware
- Bridge: Adjustable Tune-o-matic bridge
- Pickup: 2 single-coil pickups

Colors available
- Black, white, green, light blue, red - custom colors also made in smaller numbers

The Danelectro C model guitars were the first instruments designed by Danelectro, coming in both single and dual pickup versions. Designed by 1953, until being replaced by the Danelectro U model in 1956. they were put into production and retailed from 1954 to 1955

Unlike most all the later Danelectro instruments, the C model was a solid body construction made of poplar and came in a peanut-like body shape. These early guitars did not have a modern truss rod, but had a ¾" square aluminum tube to prevent the neck from warping.

On debut these first guitars predated Danelectro's now signature lipstick pickup design, and instead wrapped their pickups in vinyl tape and placed them hidden under a melamine pickguard. This was replaced in 1955 when Nathan Daniel apparently acquired a job lot of surplus lipstick tubes which he utilized for makeshift pickup covers. The pickups when both selected are wired in series rather than the more standard parallel used today by most big brands.
