= Danelectro Dano Pro =

Electric guitar

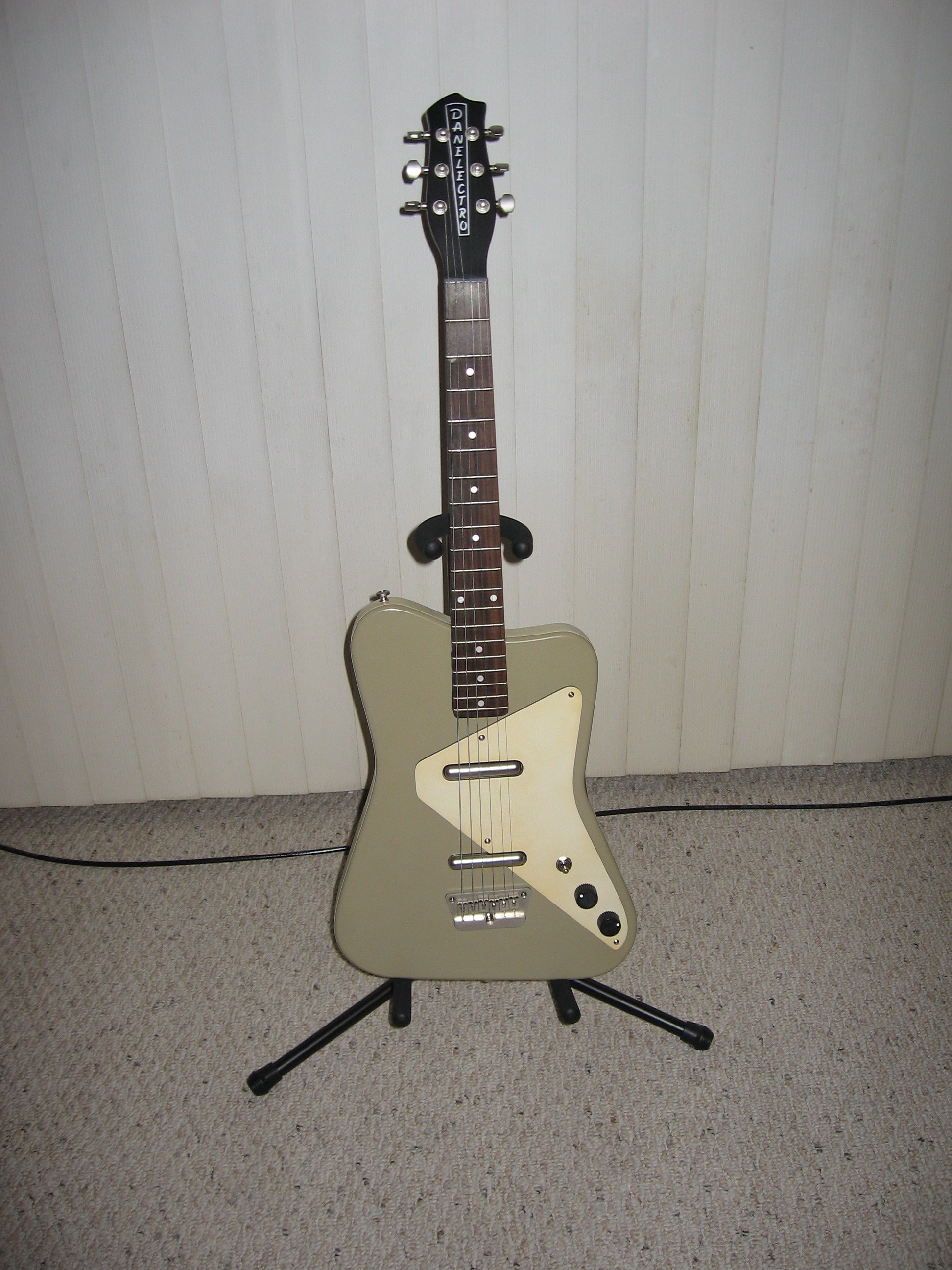
- 2007 Danelectro Dano Pro reissue in tan
- Manufacturer: Danelectro
- Period: Original: 1963-1964/Reissue: 2007, 2012

Construction
- Body type: masonite top and bottom with plywood frame;hollow body.
- Neck joint: Bolt-on

Woods
- Body: Basswood
- Neck: Maple, Original: 21.0" scale/Reissue: 25.0" sca
- Fretboard: Rosewood, Original: 17 frets/Reissue: 19 frets

Hardware
- Pickup(s): Original: 1 Lipstick pickup/Reissue: 2 pickups (Original style brass tube with chrome plating)

Colors available
- 2007 reissue: Keen Green, Royal Blue, Burgundy, Gold, Black, Red, Tangerine, Aqua, Tan, Peach. 2012 reissue: Red Metallic, Blue Metallic, Black

The Danelectro Dano Pro is an electric guitar made by Danelectro in 1963 and 1964, reissued in 2007 and again in 2012.

== Characteristics ==
The guitar body is hollow, made of masonite and plywood with a maple neck and rosewood fingerboard. The body's vaguely trapezoidal shape has led to it being described as a bowtie or Flintstone guitar.

== Original ==
The original was a 3/4 scale guitar with a single lipstick tube pickup, made by putting the pickup in surplus lipstick tubes purchased from a cosmetics supplier. The original had a short scale neck with a non-adjustable bridge.

== Reissue ==
The reissue features two lipstick pickups. The pickups are wired in series rather than in parallel as is common with most electric guitars. Because of this, the guitar is louder when the toggle is set to both the neck and bridge pickups rather than when only one pickup is selected. The reissue has a fully adjustable bridge and a full scale neck of 19 frets with the neck connecting to the body at the 14th fret. Because of this, playing the higher frets is nearly impossible. Its light tone and slight twang makes it very suitable for playing jangle pop, surf, country and blues.

Guitarist Magazine said of the 2007 reissue "if it's Jack White or Jon Spencer dirty fuzzbox blues you are after, it's here in spades, alongside with Beatles-in-Hamburg rock 'n' raunch, garage punk venom and 1980s indie jangle."
