= Silvertone (brand) =

Brand of electronics and musical instruments

- Product type: Consumer electronics; Musical instruments
- Current owner: RBIMusic (2021–Present)
- Country: United States
- Introduced: 1916
- Markets: Worldwide (Distributed by RBI Music)
- Previous owners: Sears (1916–1972)
- Registered as a trademark in: United States (2013)
- Website: silvertoneguitars.com

Silvertone is a brand created and promoted by Sears for its line of consumer electronics and musical instruments from 1916 to 1972.

The rights to the Silvertone brand were purchased by South Korean corporation Samick Music in 2001. Samick made new musical instruments under the Silvertone brand and relaunched some historic models. In 2020, RBI Music was appointed the exclusive worldwide distributor of the Silvertone brand, and in December 2021, RBI acquired all rights to the brand.

Musical instruments under the Silvertone name are flute, electric and acoustic guitars, basses, accordions, and ukuleles.

== History ==
=== Beginnings ===
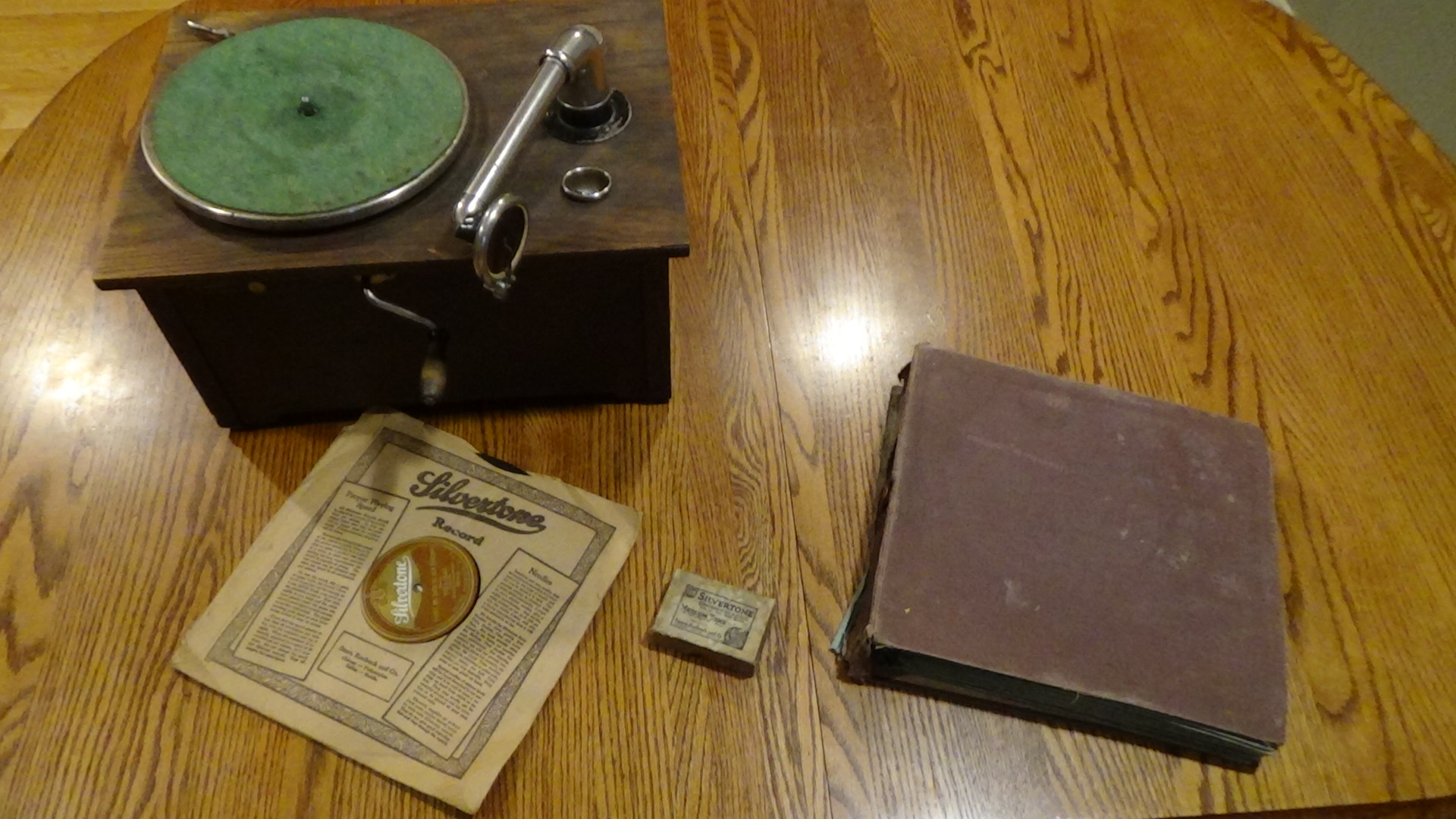
A Silvertone model 1 and other early Silvertone products.

Sears filed for Silvertone as a trademark in late 1915 to be used as a house brand for a line phonographs and records. It was approved in early 1916 with their first phonograph models appearing in their Spring 1916 catalog and the records following later that year.

Beginning in the 1920s, the brand was expanded to include Silvertone radios and again expanded in the 1930s to musical instruments, superseding the previously used Oxford branding.

Radio receivers
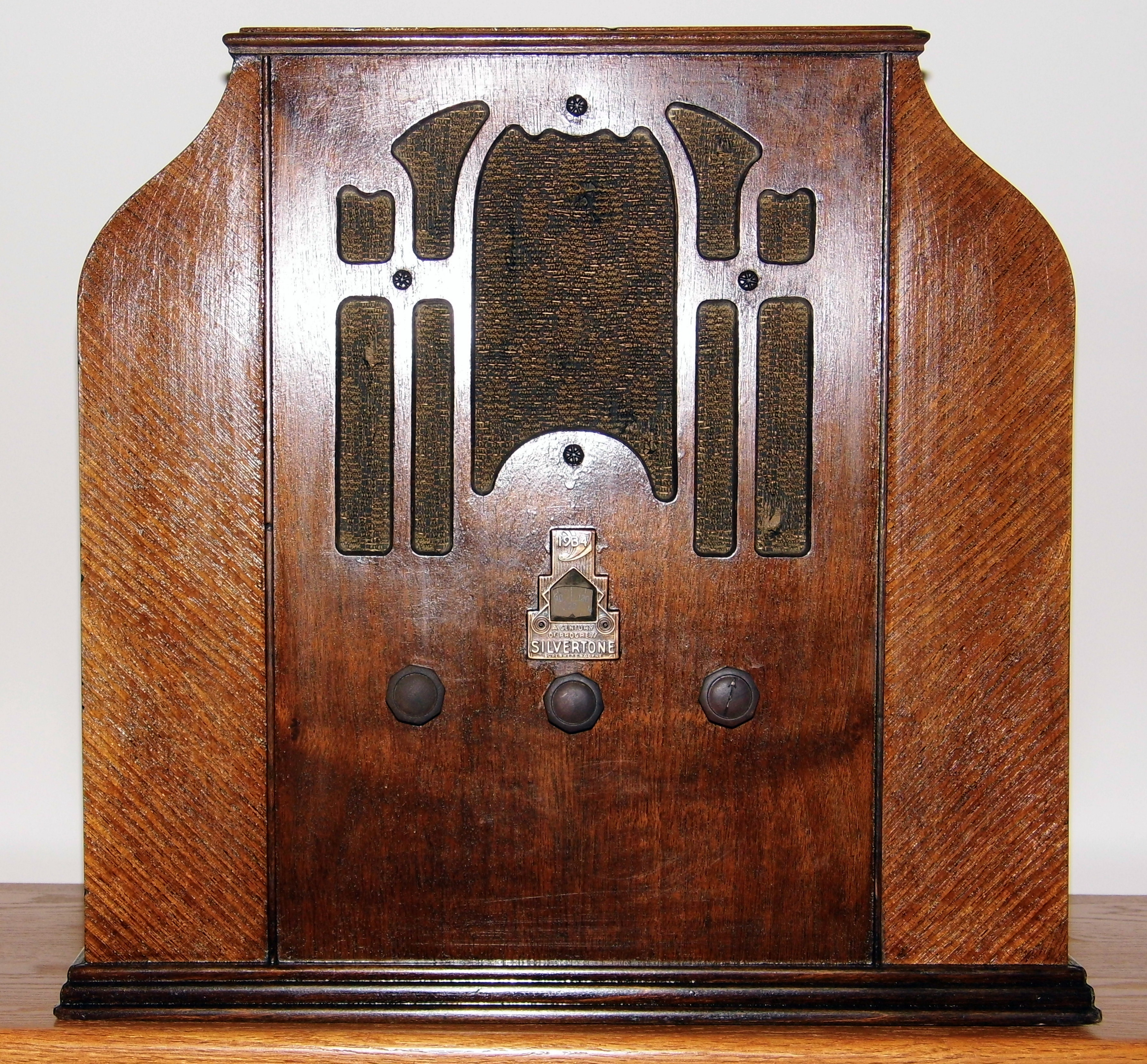
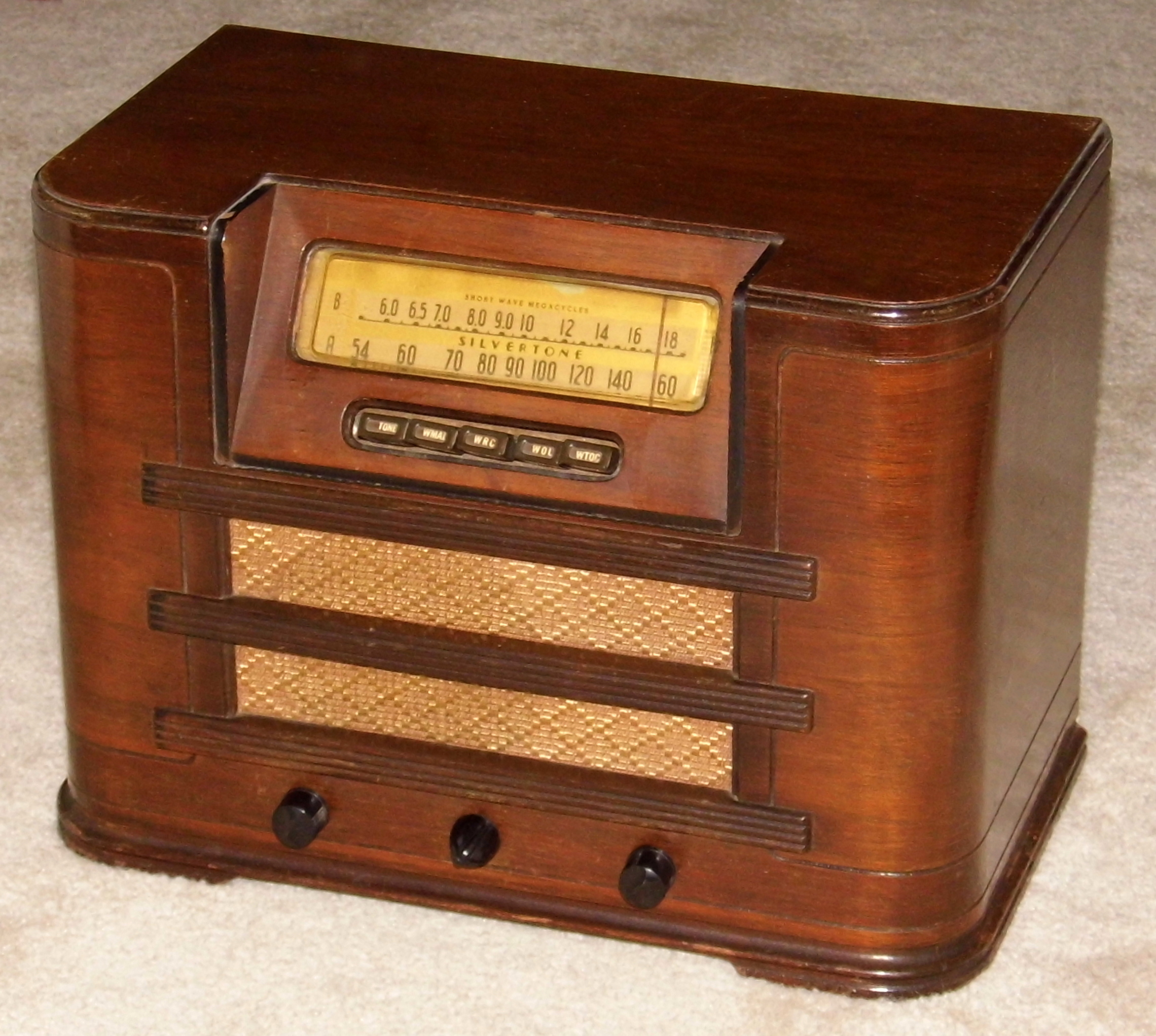
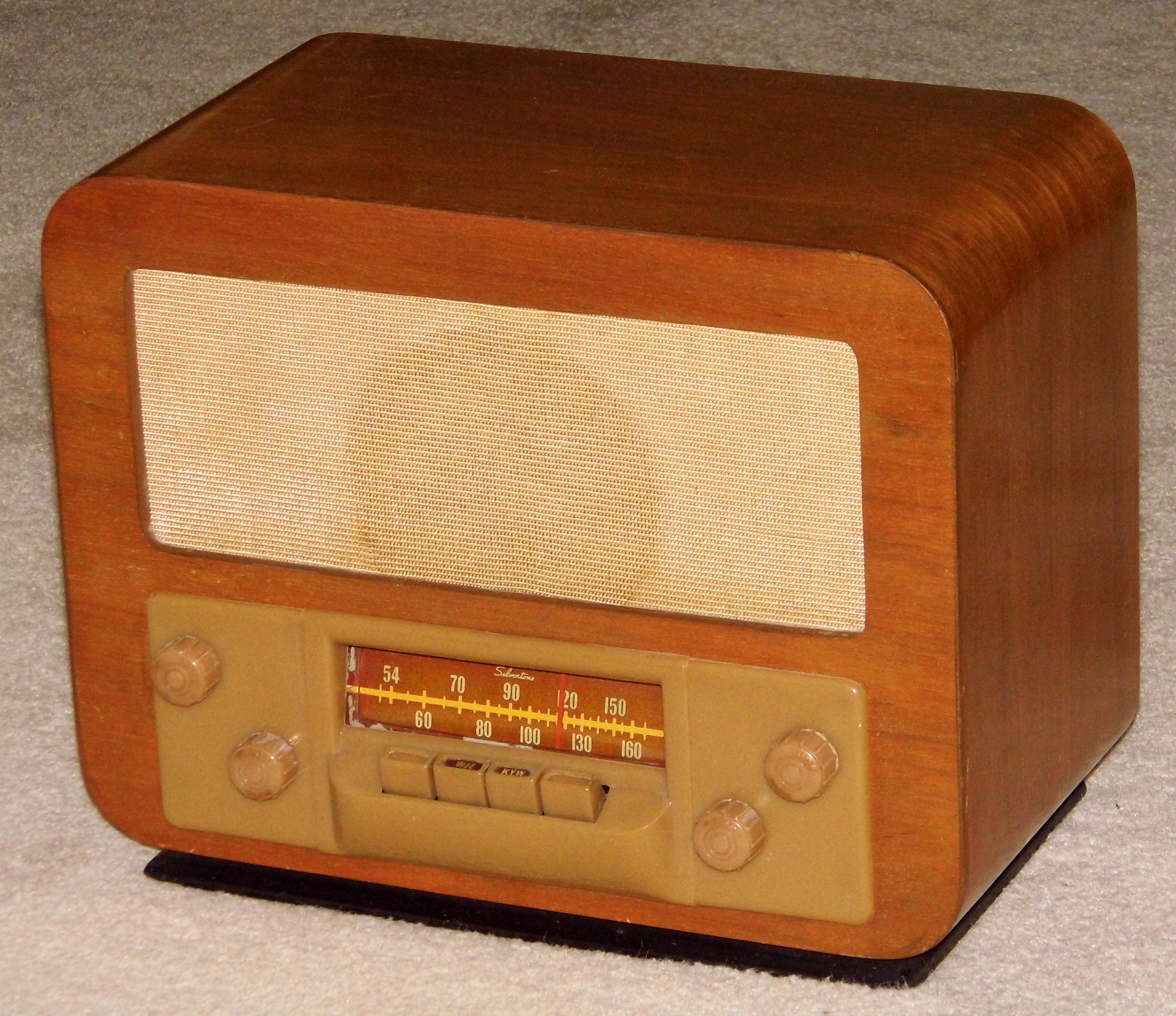
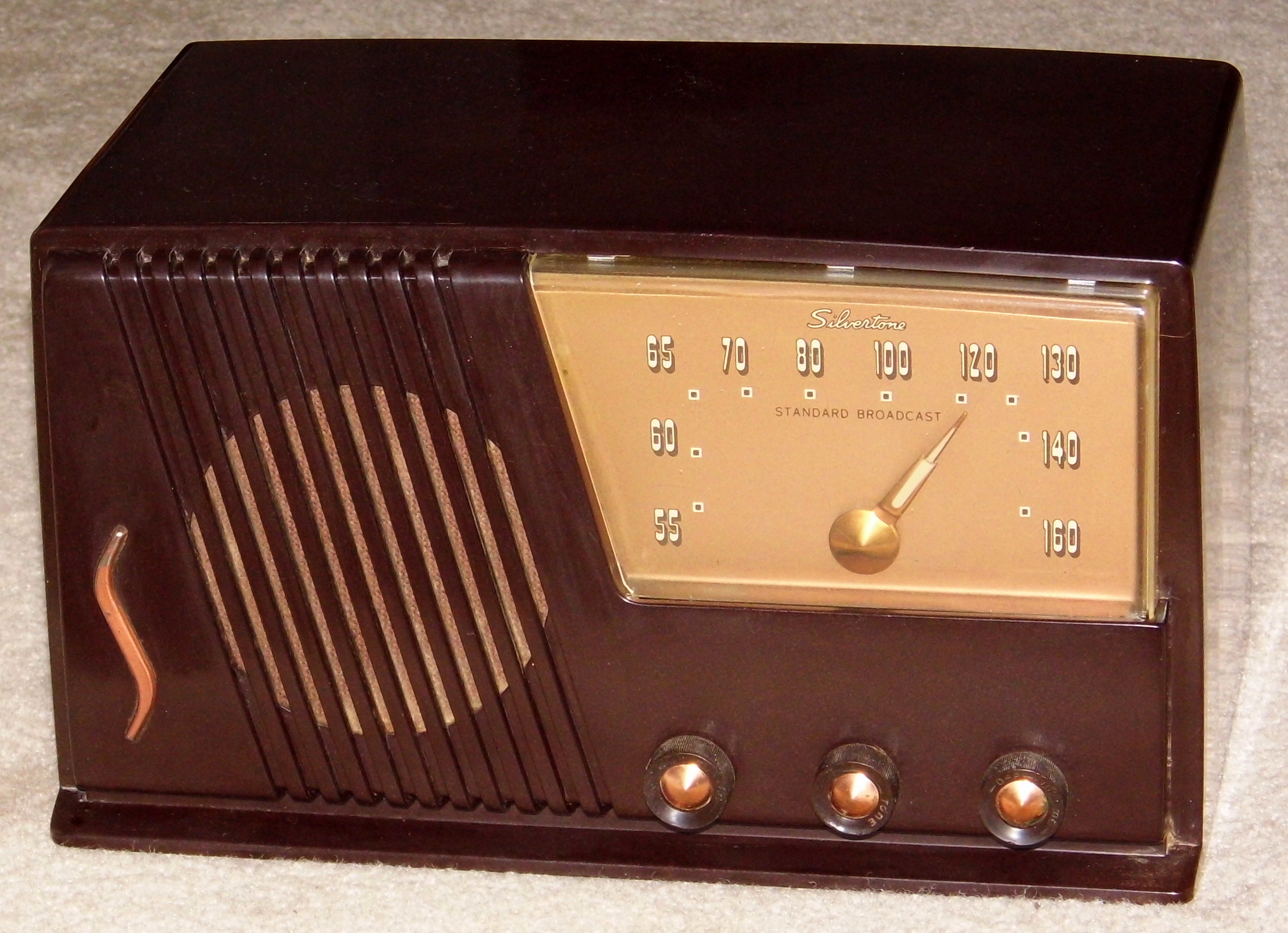
From left to right: "Century of Progress" (1934), 7036A (1941–42), 7504 (1947), model 15 (1950)

In the early 1920s Sears began selling Silvertone radio tubes and batteries, although Silvertone radios decreased in popularity during late 1930s. During World War II, Sears introduced the Silvertone radio antenna for their radio receivers.

=== Musical instruments ===
Silvertone guitars became popular with novice musicians due to their low cost and wide availability in Sears stores and the Sears catalog. The Canadian band Chad Allan and The Silvertones (later The Guess Who) and Chris Isaak and Silvertone took their name from this line of instruments. Silvertone guitar model #1446 is now unofficially considered “The Chris Isaak” guitar due to him playing one early in his career. A display at the Country Music Hall of Fame features the first guitar and amplifier (built into the guitar case) ever owned by country music star Brad Paisley, a Silvertone model #1448, a Christmas gift he received from his grandfather in 1980 .

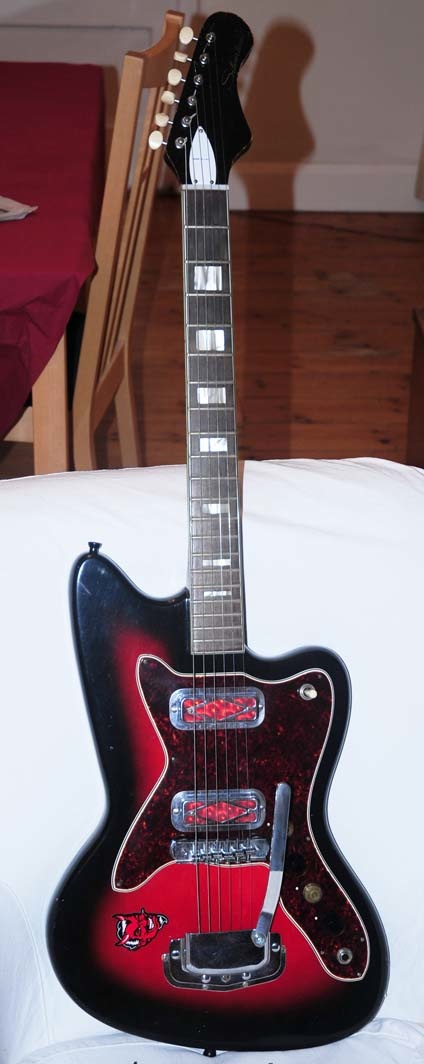
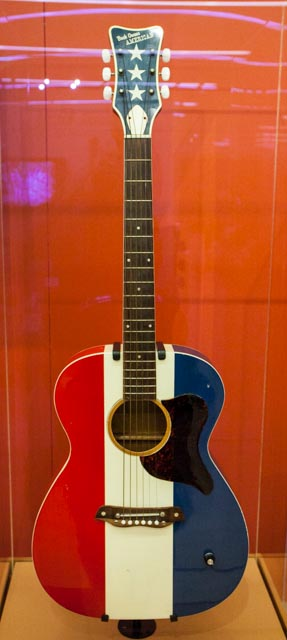
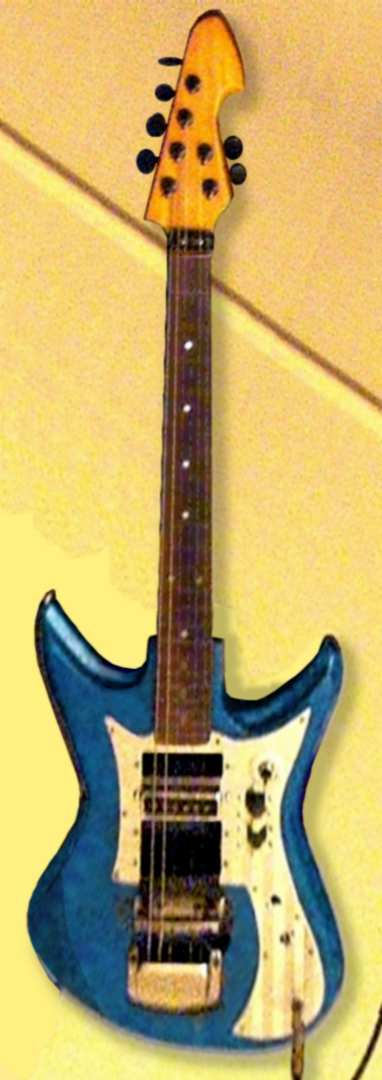
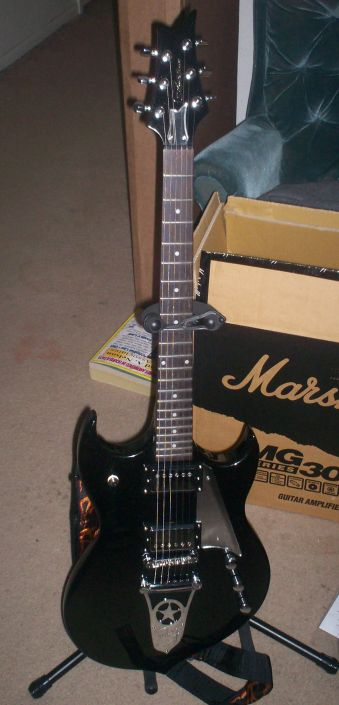
From left to right: S1480 (Harmony H19 silhouette), S1219 Buck Owens (by Harmony); ET-460 (Teisco K-4L/ET-460), Paul Stanley Sovereign Special (by Samick)

Silvertone instruments and amplifiers were manufactured by various companies, including Danelectro, Valco, Harmony, Thomas, Kay and Teisco.

The guitars, especially the 1960s models, are frequently prized by collectors today. Two of the best-known Silvertone offerings are the Danelectro-built Silvertone 1448 and 1449, made in the early to mid-1960s. The 1448 had a single lipstick pickup, while the 1449 was equipped with a two-pickup configuration, and was succeeded in 1964 by the 1457 model. These guitars' cases had a small amplifier built into their cases, and the guitars themselves had very short-scale 18-fret necks, which proved popular with beginners.

Similarly the Silvertone 1484 "Twin Twelve" 60-watt guitar amplifier, introduced in 1963 as an affordable beginner's amp, has gained a collectors' following, since artists like Jack White, Beck, Coldplay, and others have been known to use it.

Sears also sold a number of non-stringed instruments under the Silvertone name, such as electronic organs and chord organs manufactured by the Thomas Organ Company, and harmonicas made by the Wm. Kratt Company.

=== Samick rebrand ===
Rights to the Silvertone brand were purchased by Samick Music Corporation in 2001. In 2013 Samick released the Silvertone Classic series, reissues of Silvertone electrics. The first two models released were the 1303/U2 (originally manufactured by Danelectro) and the 1478 (originally manufactured by Harmony), followed by the 1449 (also known as the "Amp-in-Case" model, originally manufactured by Danelectro), and the 1423 Jupiter (originally manufactured by Harmony). In January 2014, the Silvertone reissue 1444 bass was debuted at the Winter NAMM Show in Anaheim.

In early 2015, Samick introduced six reissue Silvertone acoustic guitars including the full-body 955 and single cutaway 955CE, the 600 in either spruce or mahogany, the "Sovereign" 633, and the 604. Some models were also made available with acoustic pickup circuitry for amplified playing. In addition, the model 853 ukulele was introduced with an amplificable version as well.

=== New distribution and owners ===
In late 2020, Samick exclusively partnered with Rhythm Band Instruments (RBI Music) for worldwide distribution, expanding the reach of the Silvertone brand and ensuring better market access for the whole product range. Based in Fort Worth, Texas, RBI Music has been developing and distributing musical instruments accessories for over sixty years, including the Vintage, Big Joe, and Fret King lines of instruments and guitar accessories.

RBI Music's president, Brad Kirkpatrick, said of the deal: “Does anyone not know the Silvertone name? We are thrilled to represent this iconic brand on a worldwide basis.” William Park, executive director of Samick Music Corporation, said “RBI Music already distributes a number of high-value brands globally... We believe they will prove an excellent fit for growing the Silvertone brand.”

A year later, RBI bought all rights to the brand from Samick, ending the two decades of Samick's involvement with Silvertone.

== See also ==
- Silvertone Records (1916)
