= Silvertone Records (1916) =

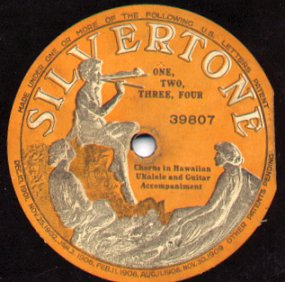
- Single side Silvertone Record, c. 1918
- Founded: 1916
- Country of origin: United States

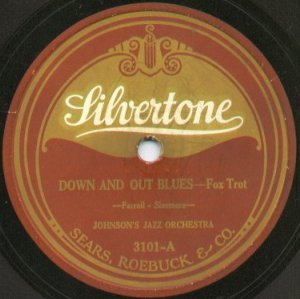
Silvertone Record from 1920s

Silvertone Records was a record label manufactured for Sears, Roebuck and Co. for sale originally in their mail order catalog and later in their chain of department stores.

Silvertone's discs were manufactured 1916–1928, and then revived briefly in 1940–1941. Early releases were single-sided lateral-cut phonograph records; in the late 1910s double-sided discs began to be released. Most discs were manufactured by Columbia Records, while some were made by Paramount Records and Gennett Records. Earlier in the label's history, it was used to supplant its sister label Oxford Records.

== See also ==
- List of record labels
- Silvertone Records (disambiguation)
- Oxford Records, Silvertone's sister label
- Silvertone (brand)
