= Silvertone Records =

Silvertone Records has been the name for at least three record companies:

- Silvertone Records (1916), a United States-based company.
- Silvertone Records (Selfridges), a United Kingdom-based company that existed in the 1930s
- Silvertone Records (1980), a United Kingdom-based company.
