= Harvard Records =

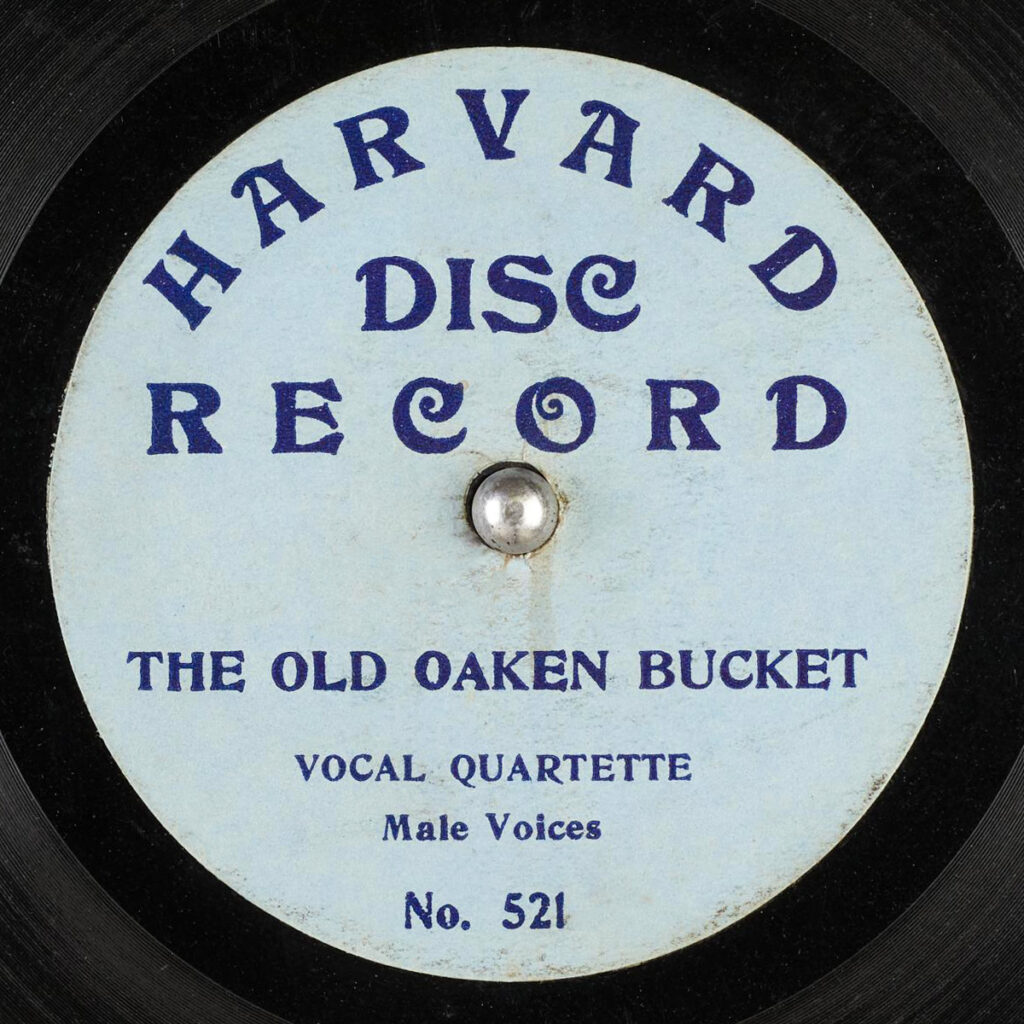
- Parent company: Sears, Roebuck and Co.
- Founded: 1905
- Defunct: 1907
- Status: Inactive
- Country of origin: United States

Harvard Records was the first name brand used by Sears, Roebuck and Co. for their cylinders and disc records, sold through their mail order catalogs.

The masters were leased from Columbia and sold through Sears catalog as a cheaper alternative to the Columbia discs Sears was also offering. It was replaced by the Oxford label through 1906–1907.

== History ==
Sears had been selling cylinder records under their company name since the 1890s. Harvard was the first attempt at marketing their own records through their catalog as a brand. The name likely came from a nearby street where Sears moved to in 1905. Originally for phonographs, before being applied to cylinder and disc records in the early 1900s.

Columbia leased the masters to Sears, with some being as early as 1902. The first discs issued were 7" with a plain blue label. The next label issued were 10" with red lettering and trademark flag.

Sears continued the label till in 1906, when Oxford was introduced, and the Harvard label was gradually phased out until it was entirely dropped the following year. Some overstock Harvard phonographs were still being advertised into 1909. Although Harvard was briefly used, it paved the way for Sears' house brands.
