= Silvertone Records (Selfridges) =

Silvertone Records was a short-lived British department store record label, which was one of the house labels of Selfridges in the 1930s.

== History ==
After 1935 Silvertone Records issued 8-inch discs made by British Homophone Co. Ltd. for sale in Selfridges department stores using masters from their Plaza label. While the discs were only 8 inches in diameter, as the grooves were close, it had a long playing time equivalent to standard records. The quality of Plaza recordings was considered good. British Homophone discontinued production of its own records in April 1935, and was sold jointly to EMI and Decca Records in May 1935, but continued to press discs for other companies. Silvertone releases were selected from the Plaza catalogue by Britain's first disc jockey Christopher Stone. To keep production costs lower, public domain works were recorded, and artists contracted to other labels were given pseudonyms on Silvertone releases.

== Discography ==
The records had a catalogue number series starting at S-1, but the series was fairly short-lived. Only three releases have been discovered.

- S-1 "Farewell to Arms", from the 1932 film A Farewell to Arms (Music and lyrics by Allie Wrubel and Abner Silver) (Matrix L-989) by Ben Fields and his Dance Band (nom de disque for Syd Lipton's Band) b/w "A Thousand and One Nights" (Matrix L-997) by Charles Baxter's String Band This is a reissue of Plaza P-101. (nom de disque for Mantovani).
- S-2 "Da-Dar, Da-Dar (waltz)" (written by Robert Hargreaves, Stanley J. Damerell, and Tolchard Evans) (Matrix L-985) by Silver Dance Band (nom de disque for Syd Lipton's Grosvenor House Band) b/w "On My Mind" (Matrix L-1009) by Eddie Walters' Dance Band (nom de disque for Nat Star's Dance Orchestra). This is a reissue of Plaza P-102.
- S-3 "Till the Clock Strikes Three" (Matrix L-1019) by Eddie Walter's Dance Band (nom de disque for Oscar Rabin's Romany Band) b/w "Stormy Weather" (Matrix L-1031) by Silver Dance Band (nom de disque for Nat Star's Dance Orchestra). This is a reissue of Plaza P-104.

== See also ==
- List of record labels
- Silvertone Records (disambiguation)
