= List of Danelectro players =

This is an alphabetized list of musicians who have made significant use of Danelectro, Silvertone or Coral guitars, basses, sitars and effects in live performances or studio recordings.

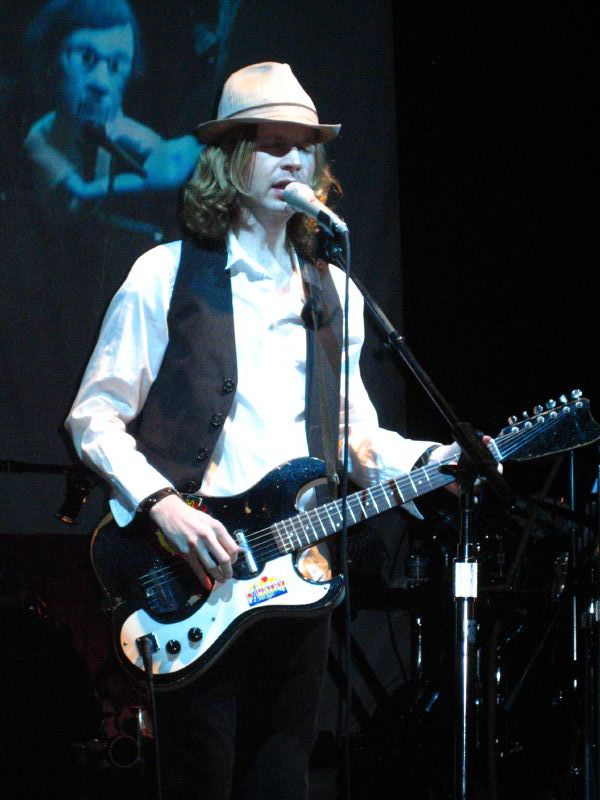
Beck in concert, playing his primary guitar, a Vintage Danelectro Silvertone. September 29, 2006.

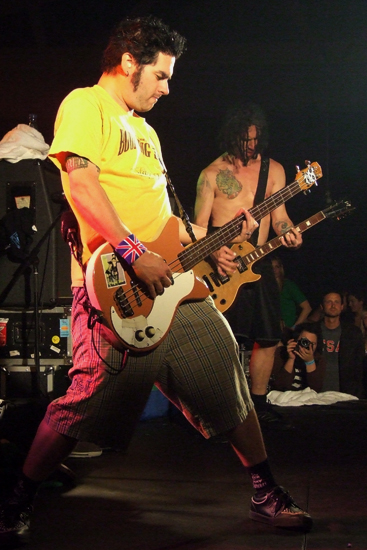
Fat Mike in concert in South Africa, September 2007, playing a Danelectro bass.

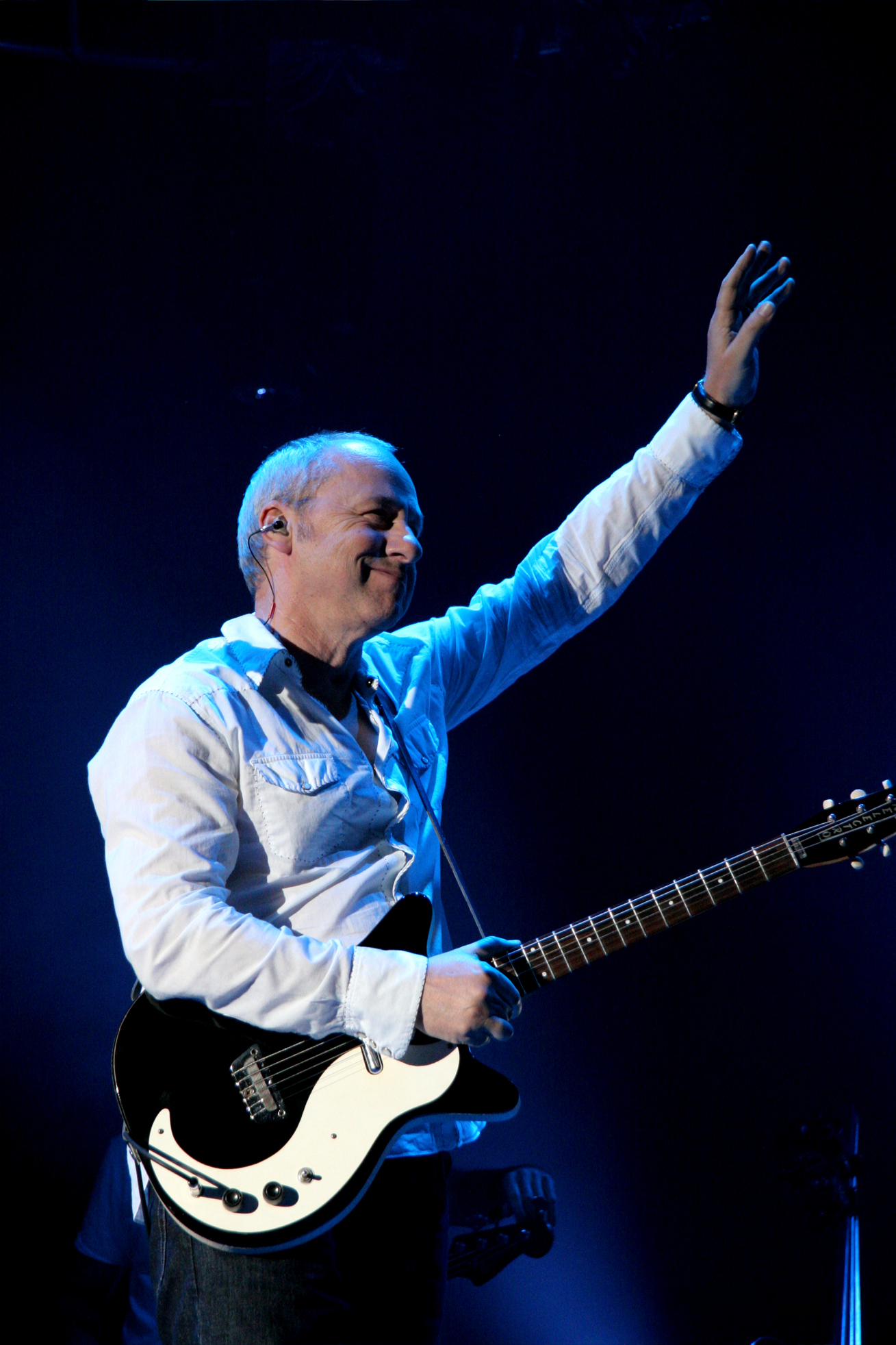
Mark Knopfler in concert in 2006 with his Danelectro DC

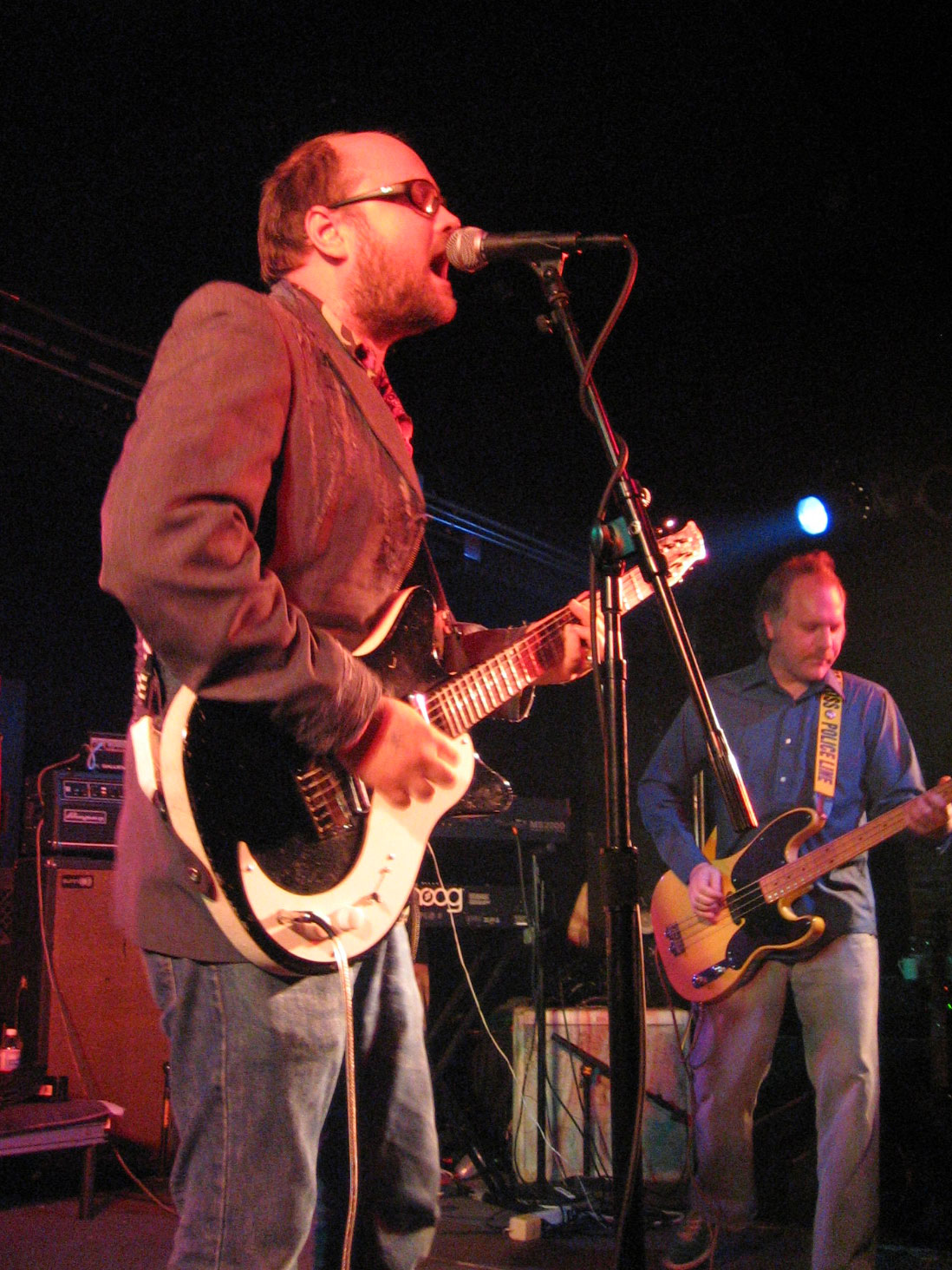
Robert Schneider with a Danelectro performing at The Black Cat October 20th, 2006

== A ==
- Ibrahim "Abaraybone" Alhabib plays a Danelectro.
- Niklas Almqvist plays a Danelectro U2 on "Hate To Say I Told You So"
- Dave Alvin uses Danelectro pedals and effects

== B ==
- Richard Barone played a Danelectro on his Clouds Over Eden album, specifically "Nobody Knows Me" and "Paper Airplane"
- Syd Barrett used a single-coil Danelectro 59 DC on the first two Pink Floyd albums.
- Beck plays a vintage Silvertone guitar and often a Dano Pro
- Jeff Beck played a baritone guitar on his 2003 release Jeff.
- Billy Bragg
- Phoebe Bridgers plays a Danelectro Black Metalflake 56 Baritone guitar.
- Jack Bruce used a Danelectro bass
- Peter Buck guitarist and co-founder of R.E.M. uses Danelectro 12-strings.
- R. L. Burnside

== C ==
- J. J. Cale
- Randy California
- Glen Campbell
- Mike Campbell uses Danelectro guitars, pedals and effects
- Eric Clapton used a Danelectro 59-DC
- Nels Cline uses Silvertone and Danelectro guitars on his album Instrumentals
- Bruce Cockburn
- Ry Cooder plays slide guitar on Silvertone guitars.
- Elvis Costello appeared in ads for Danelectro when the brand was relaunched in the late 1990s and plays Danelectro and Silvertone guitars on his album When I Was Cruel.
- Gianluca Ciccarelli ('A 67 )

== D ==
- Rob Darken
- Mac Demarco
- Dum Dum Girls
- Victoria De Angelis (Måneskin) often uses a red Danelectro longhorn with a black custom star in the middle
- Bob Dylan uses a Danelectro Bellzouki 12-string guitar on "Hurricane".

== E ==
- Steve Earle
- Dave Edmunds
- John Entwistle used a Longhorn bass in the 1960s
- Melissa Etheridge
- Mark Oliver Everett from Eels plays a variety of different coloured Danelectro Pro 56 and a black Danelectro Baritone.

== F ==
- Fat Mike plays a Danelectro DC bass.
- Samantha Fish plays a Danelectro Silver Metalflake 56 Baritone guitar.
- John Flansburgh has a Longhorn guitar he is famous for.
- John Fogerty
- Matthew Followill plays a Danelectro u2 on "Genius"
- John Frusciante
- Tomethy Furse

== G ==
- Rory Gallagher played a Silvertone amongst many other guitars.
- Jerry Garcia got a Danelectro as his first guitar.
- Rinus Gerritsen of a Golden Earring plays a Longhorn bass.
- Tom Guerra

== H ==
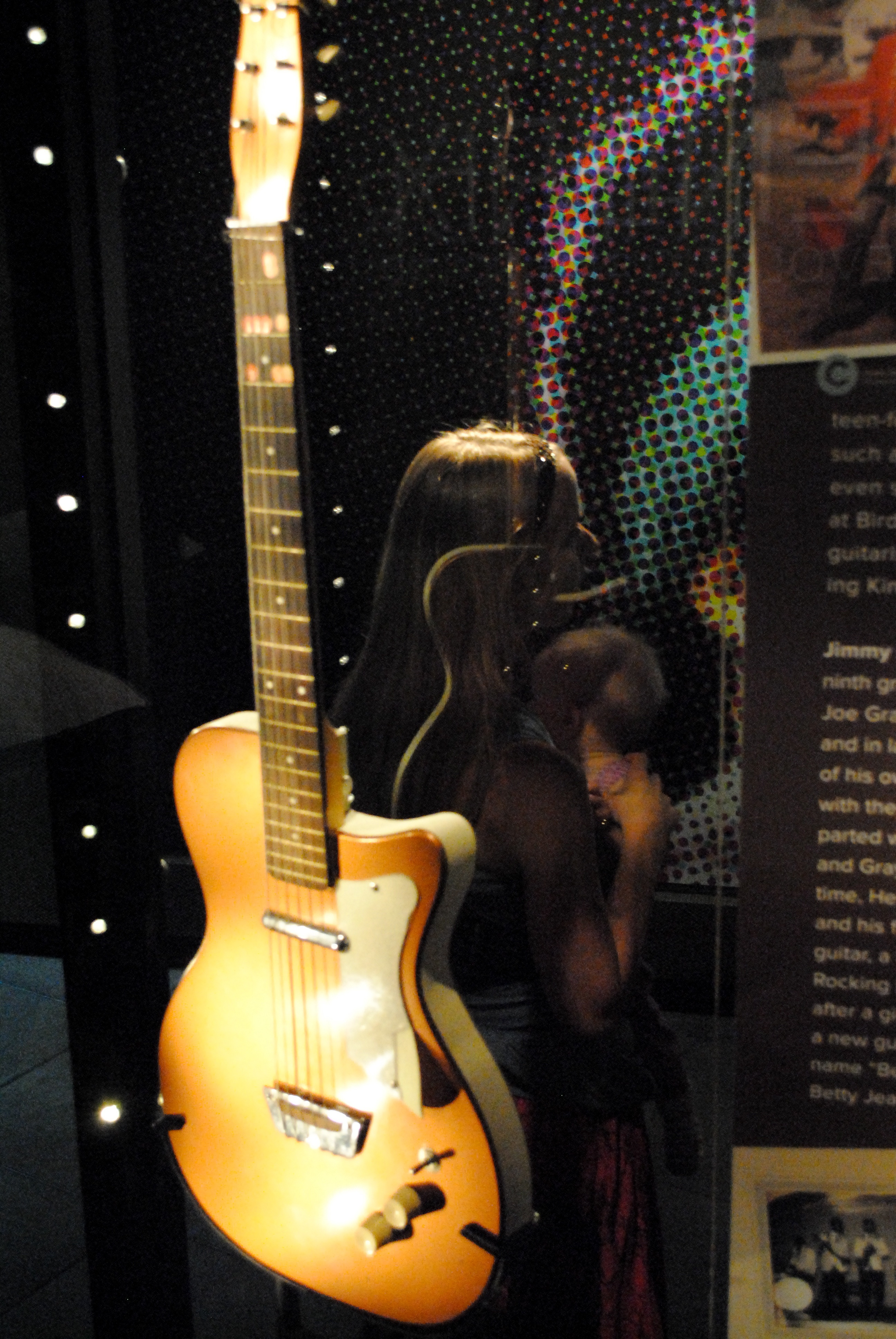
Jimi Hendrix's Danelectro U1

- Rene Hall Used a Dan-0 6-string bass on many tunes including Ritchie Valens' "La Bamba"
- Kirk Hammett
- George Harrison
- Richard Hawley
- Alvin Youngblood Hart
- Richard Hell
- Jimi Hendrix
- Greg Hill
- Josh Homme
- Earl Hooker
- John Lee Hooker
- Lightnin' Hopkins
- Steve Howe
- J. B. Hutto
- James Hetfield in AWMH 2024 performing Fuel

== J ==
- Mick Jagger
- Damien Jurado
- Jupiter Apple

== K ==
- Ira Kaplan
- King Buzzo uses a Danelectro in the studio.
- Kira used a Danelectro guitar in concerts from about 2004–2007.
- Mark Knopfler

== L ==
- Jeff Lang
- Alvin Lee
- Alex Lifeson
- David Lindley used a Silvertone in concert
- Arto Lindsay
- Gary Louris

== M ==
- Ian MacKaye
- Bo Madsen
- Steve Marriott
- Chan Marshall
- Jeff Martin
- Dave Matthews
- Mike McCready
- James McNew
- Tyson Meade
- Stephin Merritt
- Jason Molina
- Thurston Moore

== N ==
- Graham Nash plays a Danelectro Longhorn on "Just One Look" with The Hollies on Shindig! in 1965
- Dave Navarro
- A.C. Newman
- Colin Newman
- Juice Newton
- Vincent Nevraumont plays a Danelectro DC 59 with the band Beatles Juice (2024)
- No todo esta mal (2023 Monterrey Mexico )

== O ==
- Conor Oberst

== P ==
- Jimmy Page used a modified 59 DC Danelectro (scruffy white one he said he paid £30 for in early 1966) in studio when he was a session guitarist, and for live performances of a few songs with Led Zeppelin, particularly “Kashmir”, “White Summer, Black Mountain Side” and “In My Time of Dying”.
- Brad Paisley
- Rick Parfitt
- Joe Perry
- Tom Petersson
- Tom Petty on the Wildflowers album; with the Traveling Wilburys he played a Longhorn bass.
- Cat Power
- Elvis Presley
- Steve Priest

== R ==
- Dee Dee Ramone
- Noel Redding
- Kid Rock
- Daniel Rossen
- Daniel Rostén

== S ==
- Richie Sambora frequently uses Danelectro guitars and effects in concert and in the studio.
- Robert Schneider uses a Danelectro in concert
- Pat Smear
- Fred Smith who began performing with New York punk act Television in 1975.
- Joey Spampinato NRBQ Single cut, dbl cut, and Longhorn basses throughout his career
- Alan Sparhawk
- Bruce Springsteen
- Billy Squier has been seen using a 59 dc during his concerts
- Chris Squire Danelectro Longhorn 6 string bass
- Ken Stringfellow

== T ==
- Garry Tallent
- Jagori Tanna (I Mother Earth)
- Porl Thompson (The Cure) used 2 Danelectro guitars during The Cure 2005 Tour
- Richard Thompson used a Danelectro U2 on several recordings
- Pete Townshend
- Corin Tucker uses a Danelectro Baritone in the studio and a DC-3 early in her career
- Ike Turner
- Jeff Tweedy

== V ==
- Eddie Van Halen - used Danelectro necks on various guitars.
- Jimmie Vaughan
- Tom Verlaine
- Joe Venti (Mountain)

== W ==
- Tom Waits
- Jeff Walls
- Miroslav Wanek plays a Danelectro on several albums
- Brian Wilson
- Amy Winehouse is seen playing a Danelectro in her documentary AMY.
- Ron Wood
- Link Wray used a Danelectro Longhorn during his heyday

== Y ==
- Thom Yorke

== Z ==
- Frank Zappa
