= Danelectro =

Brand of guitars and accessories since 1947

- Type: Private (1947–1969); Brand (1969–present)
- Industry: Musical instruments
- Founded: 1947; 79 years ago Red Bank, New Jersey, U.S.
- Founder: Nathan Daniel
- Fate: Company defunct in 1969; brand acquired by MCA Inc.
- Headquarters: Camarillo, California, United States
- Products: Electric and resonator guitars, basses, electric sitars, amplifiers, pickups, effects units
- Owner: Evets Corporation
- Website: danelectro.com

Danelectro is a brand of musical instruments and accessories that was founded in Red Bank, New Jersey, in 1947. The company is known primarily for its string instruments that employed unique designs and manufacturing processes. The Danelectro company was sold to the Music Corporation of America (MCA) in 1966, moved to a much larger plant in Neptune City, New Jersey, and employed more than 500 people. Nevertheless, three years later Danelectro closed its plant.

In the late 1990s, the Evets Corporation started selling instruments and accessories under the Danelectro name. In 2016, Danelectro introduced new models, including a resonator guitar.

Some of the products manufactured by Danelectro include electric and resonator guitars, basses, electric sitars, amplifiers, pickups, and effects units.

== History ==
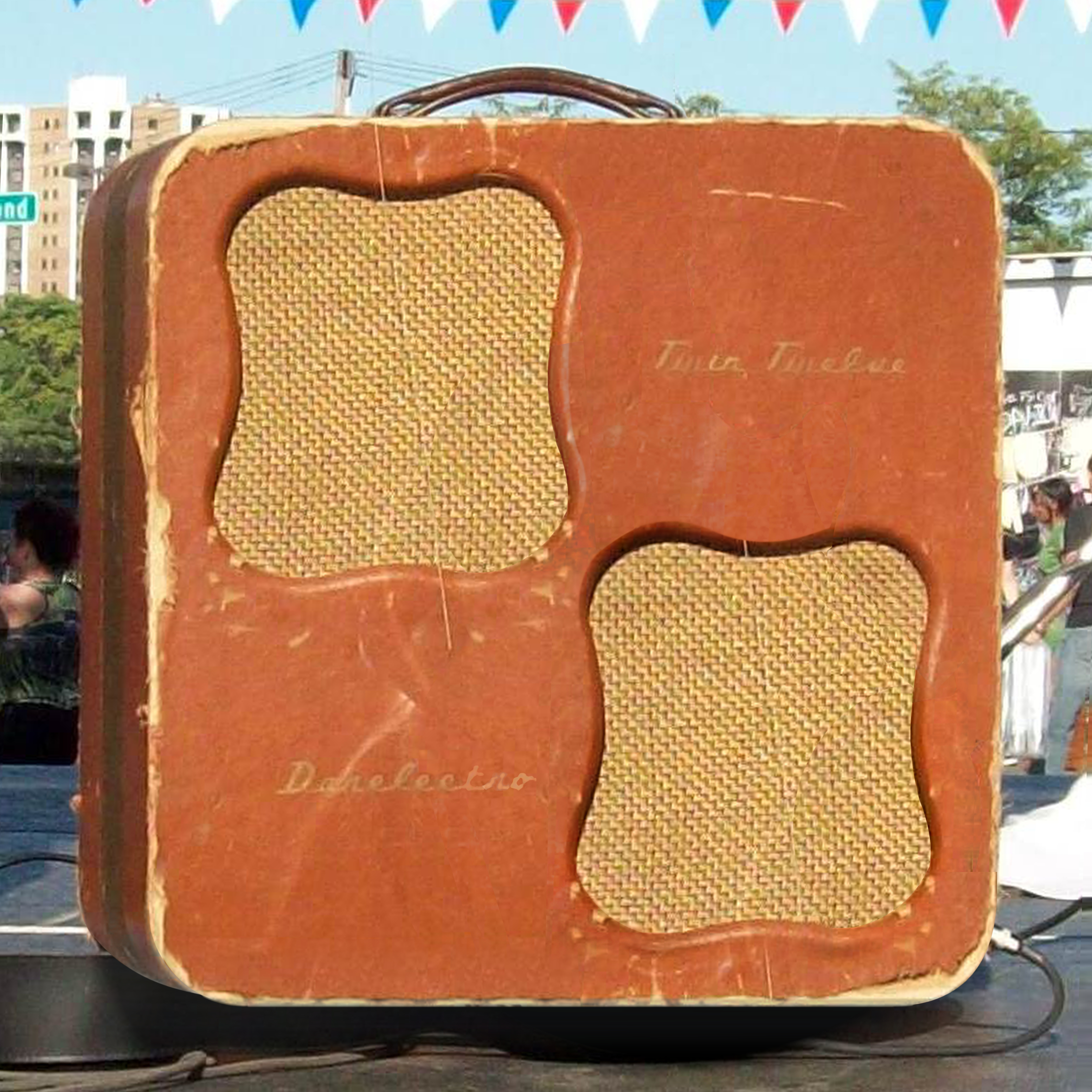
Twin Twelve amplifier, c. 1953

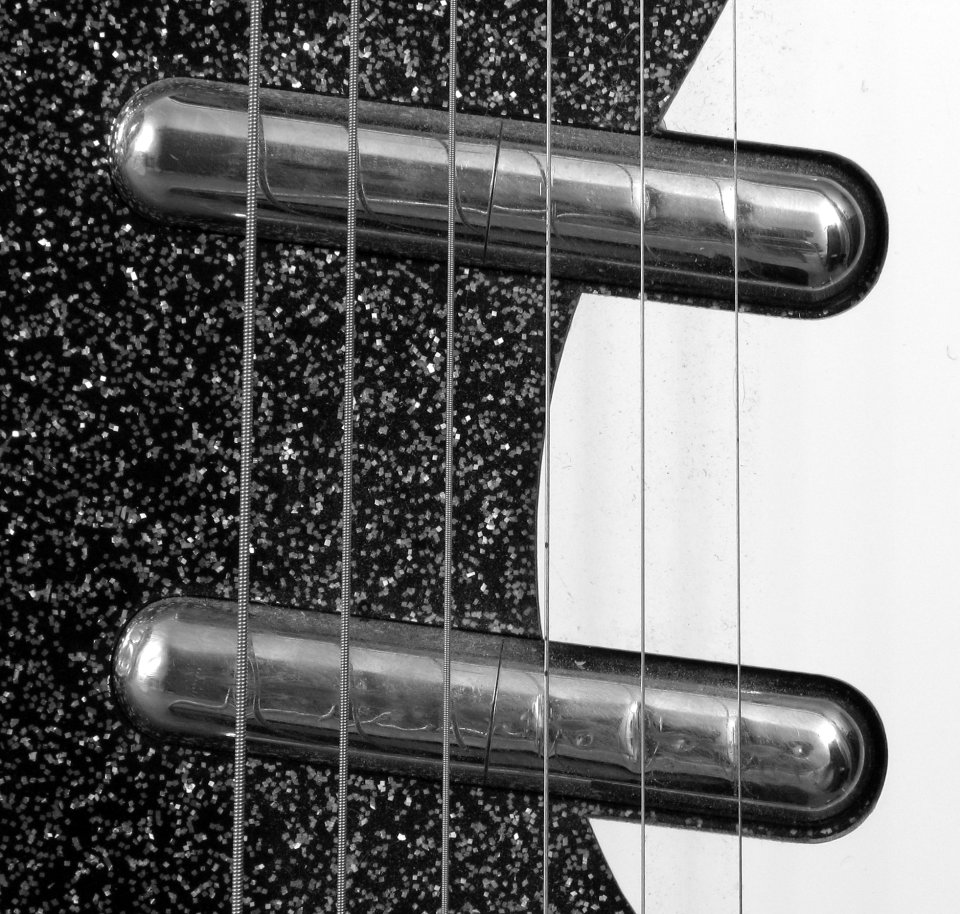
"lipstick-tube" pickups

Danelectro was founded by Nathan Daniel in 1947. Daniel's first “factory” of amplifiers was his bedroom in his parents’ New York apartment in the 1930s and he later moved his small manufacturing operation – Daniel Electrical Laboratories – of his amplifiers to a loft in Lower Manhattan, and his first big customer of his amplifiers was instrument maker Epiphone, which was also located in New York City at the time, and these amplifiers were called "Electar" by Epiphone. Throughout the late 1940s the company produced amplifiers for Epiphone (Electar amplifiers), Sears, Roebuck and Company and Montgomery Ward, branded Silvertone and Airline respectively.

In 1954 Danelectro started building solid-bodied guitars (Model C), constructed of poplar. The company then made models that were hollow-bodied and made of Masonite and poplar to save costs and increase production speed, intending to produce no-frills guitars of reasonably good quality at low cost. These instruments were branded either as Danelectro or (for Sears) Silvertone, distinguished by the Silvertone maroon vinyl covering, and the Danelectro light-colored tweed covering. The guitars used concentric stacked tone/volume knobs on the two-pickup models of both series and "lipstick-tube" pickups, which contained the pickup components inside metal tubes that resembled lipstick containers of the era.

In 1956, Danelectro introduced the six-string bass guitar, the UB-2, which retailed for $135. Though the model never became widely popular, it found an enduring niche in Nashville and Los Angeles for "tic-tac" bass lines, where the electric instrument doubled the line played by an upright acoustic bass. Danelectro's UB-2 model later prompted companies like Gibson, Fender and Höfner to also make six-string bass guitars (respectively the EB-6, introduced in 1960, the Fender VI, introduced in 1961 and Höfner's 500/10, introduced in 1960).

In 1966, Danelectro was sold to the Music Corporation of America. A year later, in 1967, they introduced the Coral line, known for its hollow-bodies and electric sitars.

In 1969, Danelectro closed down, burdened by MCA's attempt to market their guitars to small guitar shops rather than large department stores.

In the late 1990s, importer The Evets Corporation purchased the Danelectro brand name, marketing recreations of old Silvertone and Danelectro guitars and newly designed effects pedals and small amplifiers made in China. After initially selling well, guitar sales slowed and Danelectro stopped selling guitars after 2001 (2004 on the official site (Note: Although several sources seem to say that it was stopped after 2001, the guitar pages on the official site (Danelectro.com) seem to have disappeared between 2003-12-13 and 2004-01-26 as for the menu item on the top page, or between and 2004-06-03 as for the guitar page itself, according to the archives on archive.com.)) to concentrate on effects pedals. In 2006 (2005 on official site (Note: Although several sources seem to say that the decision was in 2006, the guitar pages on the official site (Danelectro.com) seem to have resurrected between 2005-02-09 and 2005-02-19, according to the archives on archive.com.)), new owners of Evets decided on a new marketing model for guitars, selling a limited number each year.

== Guitars ==
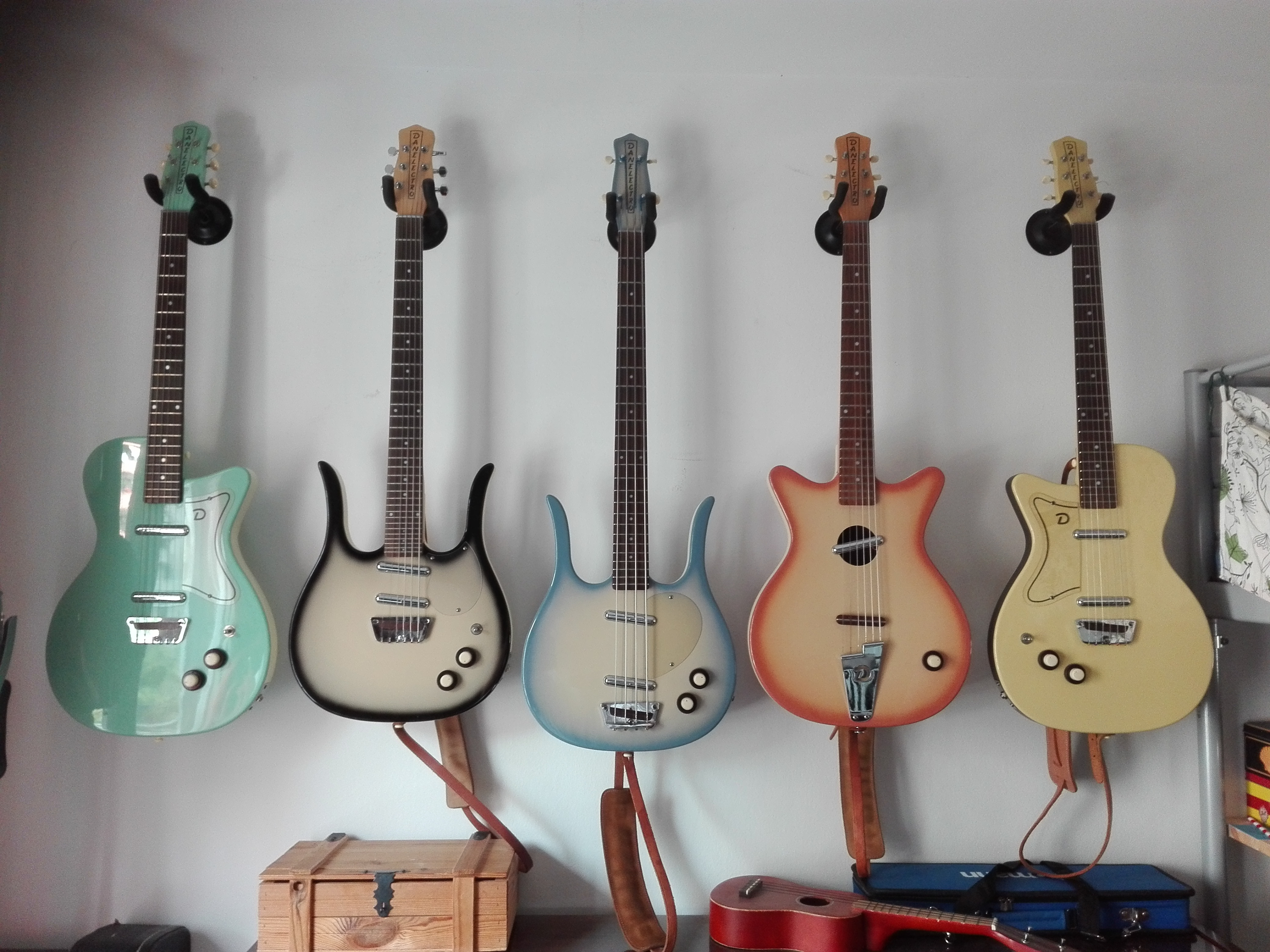
A selection of Danelectro guitars

=== Danelectro C ===
The Danelectro C was put into production and retailed from 1954 to 1955 until being replaced by the Danelectro U model in 1956. Unlike most of the later Danelectro instruments, the C model was a solid body construction made of poplar and came in a peanut-like body shape.

=== Danelectro U2 ===
The Danelectro U2 is a dual-pickup hollow-bodied guitar made of Masonite and shaped similar to a Les Paul style guitar. It was the most enduringly popular of the U-series. A single-pickup version (the U1) and triple-pickup version (the U3) were manufactured and sold alongside the U2. They were originally made from the years 1956 to 1958. It was reissued in the late 1990s, in 2006 in a slightly modified form as the '56 Pro, and again in 2010 as the '56 Single Cutaway.

=== Danelectro Shorthorn ===
The Danelectro Shorthorn line of guitars are a dual cutaway hollow-bodied design made of Masonite and poplar. The original models were introduced in 1959.

=== Danelectro Dano Pro ===
The Danelectro Dano Pro is a beginner electric guitar made by Danelectro in 1963 and 1964; it was reissued in 2007 and again in 2012. The original was a 3/4-scale guitar with a single lipstick tube pickup. The reissue features two pickups rather than one.

== Effects pedals ==
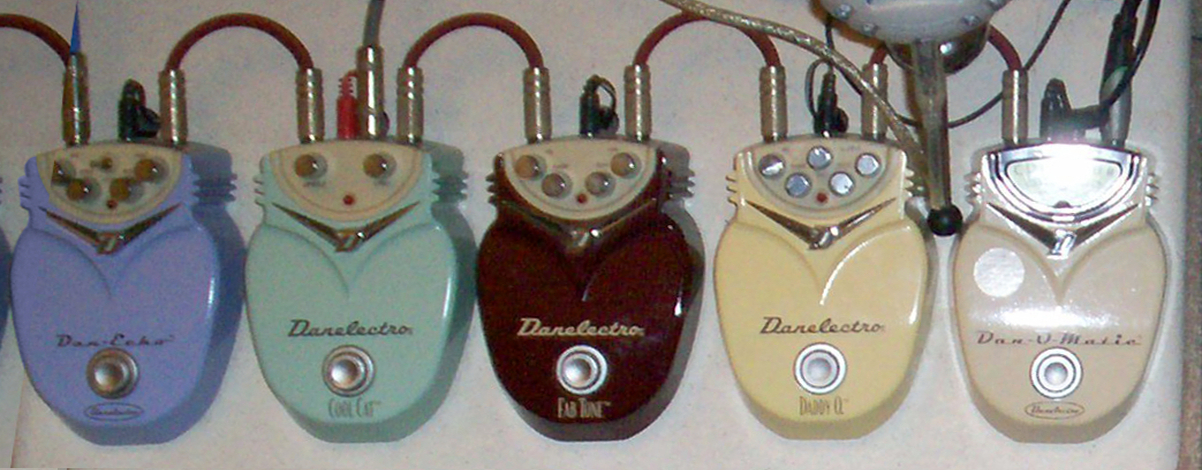
Dan-Echo simulated tape echo, Cool Cat chorus, FAB Tone distortion, Daddy O. overdrive, Dan-O-Matic tuner

The FAB series of guitar effect pedals is a budget range of pedals made by the Danelectro company that are manufactured in China. The series was launched in 2005 with the release of the FAB Distortion, FAB Overdrive, and FAB Metal pedals. Currently, eight pedals share the same distinctive injection moulded plastic casing and blue LED light. Each has a mains power DC9 socket or can be powered by a nine-volt battery. They market eight pedals lines: original effects, FAB effects, mini effects, vintage effects, Wasabi effects, Paisley effects, Cool Cat effects, and other miscellaneous effects. All run on nine-volt batteries or power adapters. The original effects featured metal enclosures and FET switching. Cool Cat models were designed with metal enclosures and true-bypass switching. Danelectro began rolling out Cool Cat V2 pedals, featuring extra "under the hood" features. Mini effects pedals are smaller, compact pedals with effects resembling those of the original effects and the FAB effects. Vintage effects include the large, rectangular Spring King and Reel Echo effect pedals. The discontinued Paisley series featured paisley-patterned drive effects in original style enclosures. The Wasabi series features large, futuristic-looking metal enclosures. FAB effects are the cheapest of the brand's lineup and feature plastic enclosures somewhat larger than the Mini effects series.

In 2006, Danelectro sold a carrying case that holds up to five mini effects. When the player is ready to play, the top could be removed and the bottom acts as a pedals board. It was shortly discontinued. Not long after, another carrying case was developed to fit five FAB or Cool Cat pedals as well as serve as a pedal board.

Despite the advantages of the mini effects, FAB effects are more common. The Mini effects are less expensive, but the plastic construction makes them fragile.

== See also ==
- List of Danelectro players (historic musicians that played Danelectro guitars)

== Bibliography ==
- Tulloch, Paul; Bechtoldt, Douglas (1995). Guitars From Neptune: A Definitive Journey Into DANELECTRO-MANIA. Backporch Publications. ASIN B000MT7OZ8.
- Tulloch, Doug (November 2008). Neptune Bound: The Ultimate Danelectro Guitar Guide. Centerstream (published 2008). ISBN 978-1-57424-239-3.
- Fjestad, Zachary R. "Blue Book of Electric Guitar Values". BlueBookOfGuitarValues.com. Blue Book Publications, Inc. Archived from the original on 2017-12-24.
- "DanGuitars.com". Archived from the original on 2017-12-31.
- "VintAxe.com".
- "MusicManSteve.com".
- "VintageDanelectro.com".
