= Oxford Records =

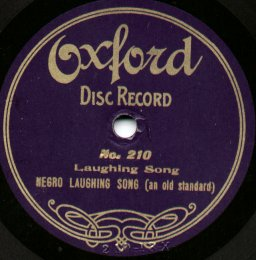
- Oxford label c. 1908 from Zonophone
- Founded: 1906
- Defunct: 1916
- Status: Defunct
- Genre: Jazz, ragtime, pop
- Country of origin: United States

Oxford Records was a record label active in the United States of America from roughly 1906 until 1916. The label was produced for Sears by several labels, including Columbia and Albany Indestructible Cylinders for cylinders and Leeds & Catlin, Zon-O-Phone, and Columbia for discs. No recording activity was undertaken by Sears. All discs were single-sided.

== History ==
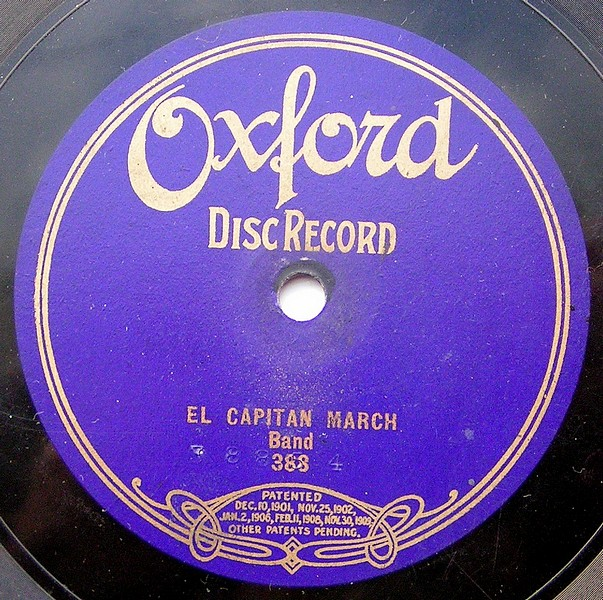
Oxford disc 388 from Columbia

In 1906, Sears introduced the Oxford disc to replace the earlier Harvard brand. These discs in the 11000 and 16000 series, were produced by Leeds & Catlin. The 1908 Sears catalog introduced 7-inch discs listed at 21 cents that were pressed by Columbia and numbered in the 7000 series. In 1909 10-inch discs from Zonophone, retailing at 30 cents, were introduced. Fall 1911 saw Sears return to Columbia for pressings. These later discs are the most commonly found. The brand was phased out in 1916 for the new Silvertone brand, although records with the Oxford label were still being shipped in late 1917. Recordings appearing on the Oxford label could be recorded anywhere from 1901 to 1916. The take number is important to dating the recording, particularly for Columbia pressings. Cal Stewart's "I'm Old But I'm Awfully Tough" (Oxford 22) first appeared on Columbia in 1901, but the issued take number of was probably recorded much later.

== Repertoire ==
Oxford discs contain the same material as released by the producing company. For the most part the titles released were popular items that were deemed likely to sell over a long period of time. A few sides from Columbia's ethnic matrix series were also released. Artists are usually generic (i.e. "band", "banjo solo" "baritone") for the earlier pressings. These were the studio ensembles of the recording company and musicians commonly used by all record companies of the time such as Vess Ossman and Arthur Collins. Later Columbia pressings often gave artist credit when such artist was not under exclusive contract to Columbia at the time.

== Notable artists appearing on Oxford ==
- Irving Berlin
- Henry Burr
- Arthur Collins
- Collins & Harlan
- Edward M. Favor
- George J. Gaskin
- Byron G. Harlan
- Ada Jones
- Bohumir Kryl
- Harry Macdonough
- Billy Murray
- Vess Ossman
- Charles A. Prince
- Peerless Quartet
- Steve Porter
- Len Spencer
- Frank C. Stanley
- Cal Stewart
- Walter Van Brunt
- Bert Williams

== See also ==
- List of record labels
