= Danelectro U2 =

Dual-pickup hollow bodied guitar

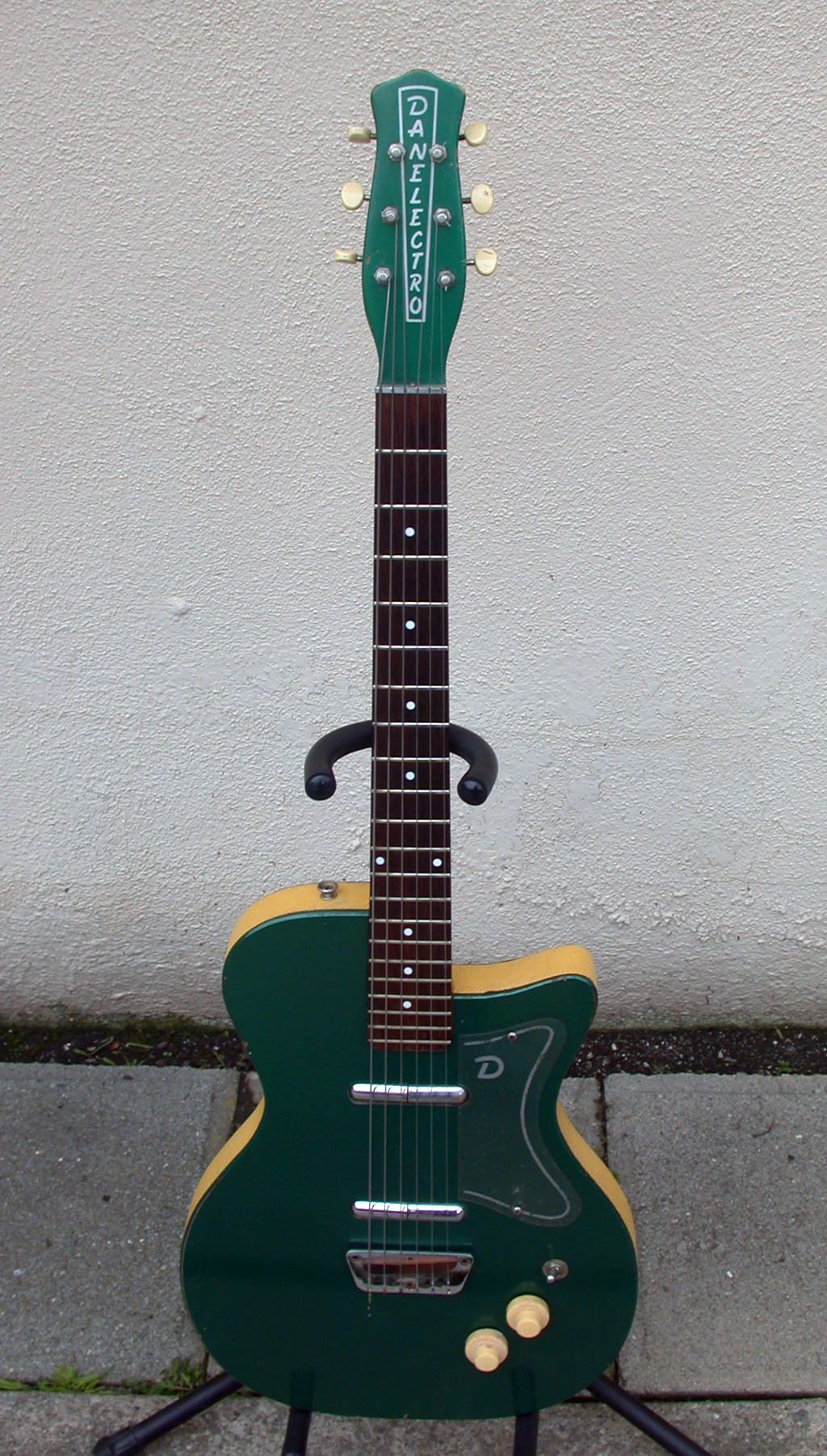
- A 1956 Danelectro U2
- Manufacturer: Danelectro
- Period: 1956 - 1958, 1996 - present

Construction
- Body type: Solid
- Neck joint: Bolt on
- Scale: 25"

Woods
- Body: Masonite, Poplar and Pine
- Neck: Poplar
- Fretboard: Brazilian Rosewood

Hardware
- Bridge: Adjustable aluminum bridge with rosewood saddle
- Pickup: 2 single-coil pickups

Colors available
- Black, white, green, light blue, red - custom colors also made in smaller numbers

The Danelectro U2 is a dual-pickup hollow bodied guitar made of Masonite and shaped similar to a Les Paul model guitar. It was originally made from the years 1956 to 1958 but was re-issued in the late 1990s, in 2006 in a slightly modified form as the '56 Pro, and again in 2010 as the '56 Single Cutaway. The sound of a U2 is distinctive, coming from its lipstick pickups which are wired in series, rather than the more standard parallel series used by most big brands. The construction materials used by Danelectro in this period are also quite unusual for guitar making. The U2's body is made of a poplar wood frame with Masonite used for both the top and back, with the side of the body being bound with creme coloured vinyl. Both a single-pickup version (the U1) and triple-pickup version (the U3), were manufactured and sold alongside the U2.

== Reissues ==
The U1, U2 and U3 were first reissued between 1998 and 2001, with the U3 including new features such as a six-position switch which would allow the player to select bridge, middle, neck, bridge and neck, bridge and middle, middle and neck, or with the "blow" switch, all three pickups at once.

In 2005 the 56 Pro was released as a limited edition re-issue of the U2. Although a re-issue, the Danelectro 56 Pro had many distinctive changes from the original models, these changes include: master tone & volume, rather than the Danelectro trademark concentric "Stacked" pots, an upgraded bridge with adjustments for intonation, higher output lipstick pickups than the originals and the first reissues, metal strap buttons to replace the plastic ones of previous models, reshaped pickguard, a different headstock shape and a black headstock rather than the matched-to-body colour of the originals and first reissues. It has a slight cut out on the 56 Pro, no vinyl which bound the sides of the guitar on the originals. Also it lacks the silk-screened outline and 'D' logo.

Vintage Guitar Magazine reviewed the 56 Pro in their June 2005 issue, saying "In all, the 56 Pro is a very cool retro axe with a quality fit and finish, easy playability and that unmistakable Danelectro tone and vibe."

The 2010 reissue came in four versions: two lipstick pickups with an either a bottle-shaped, bell-shaped, or dolphin-shaped headstock, and a three lipstick pickup version with two of the pickups side by side to create a humbucker, paired with a dolphin-shaped headstock. It is also available as a bass with the dolphin headstock.
