= Lipstick pickup =

Type of electric guitar pickup

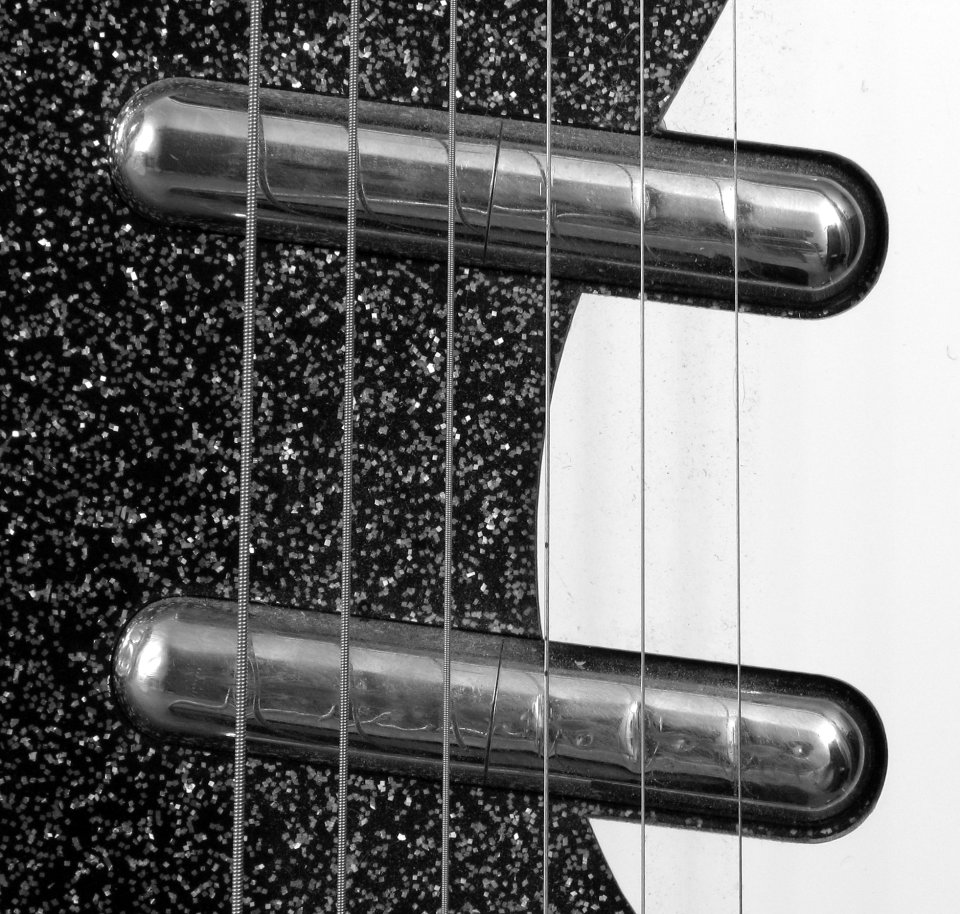
Lipstick-tube pickups on a Danelectro electric guitar

A lipstick guitar pickup is a form of single-coil magnetic guitar pickup, totally encased in a chrome-plated metal tube.

The lipstick-tube pickup was introduced by Danelectro on their line of electric guitars. The original lipstick-tube pickups were manufactured using real lipstick tubes, and were featured on Danelectro, Danelectro's Coral series, and guitars that were later marketed through Sears, Roebuck and Company department stores under the name Silvertone.

These pickups continue to be featured on Danelectro and other guitars. Current production pickups are not made using lipstick tubes, but tubes manufactured specifically for guitar pickups.

== Construction ==
Unlike a traditional guitar pickup that uses a plastic or fiber bobbin as a form for winding its coil, the lipstick-tube pickup has its coil wrapped around an alnico VI bar magnet, and then wrapped in tape, usually a cellophane-type tape on vintage units, before being inserted into the metal tube casing. Most vintage Danelectro guitars had their pickups mounted using spring-loaded brackets underneath the tube casing, which could be adjusted for height by means of screws located on the back of the guitar body. Other Danelectro guitars, like the Coral hollowbody series, suspended the pickups from the guitar's top with two screws threaded through the guitar's top and into the brackets. Modern lipstick-tube pickups are usually mounted in a pickguard.

Vintage Danelectro lipstick-tube pickups are quite wide, at 3.22 in (8.18 cm) overall. They cannot be retrofitted into a Stratocaster or similar guitar without removing plastic from the pickguard and wood from the guitar body. To overcome this situation, a variety of aftermarket lipstick-tube pickups have been offered that are the same general width as the common Stratocaster style single-coils, with a 2.77 in (7.04 cm) wide tube casing. (Note: The Fender Telecaster's neck-position pickup, despite its appearance, is not a lipstick-tube pickup. It is a traditional single-coil pickup under a chrome-plated cover.) More recently, Fender themselves introduced a Stratocaster with Seymour Duncan designed lipstick-tube pickups for their Squier line, called the Surf Stratocaster and a Fender factory special run (FSR) American Standard Stratocaster with Seymour Duncan SLS-1 lipstick pickups, as well as offering the same SLS-1 pickups as a Custom Shop option.

== Sound ==
The sound of lipstick-tube pickups is frequently described as "jangly" and is most closely associated with surf, rockabilly, and jangle pop.
