= Highflyer =

Highflyer, highflier or high flyer may refer to:

- Highflyer (horse), a British Thoroughbred racehorse
- High flyer (fishing), a vertical floating pole used to locate fishing lines
- HMS Highflyer, various Royal Navy ships
- Yamhill High Flyers, a first-year International Basketball League team based in McMinnville, Oregon
- the Univox Hi-Flier, a model of electric guitar manufactured from 1968 to 1978
- SS High Flyer, a ship that exploded in the Texas City disaster
- "High Flyer", a song by Status Quo from Whatever You Want
- High-Flyer, a China-based quantitative hedge fund and AI company

== Insects ==
- Aphnaeus hutchinsonii, or Hutchinson's high-flier, a butterfly of the family Lycaenidae
- Hydriomena furcata, or July highflyer, a moth of the family Geometridate
- Hydriomena ruberata, or ruddy highflyer, a moth of the family Geometridate
- Indianmeal moth, or North American high-flyer (Plodia interpunctella) a moth of the family Pyralidae
- May highflyer (Hydriomena impluviata) a moth of the family Geometridate

== Domestic pigeon breeds ==
- Budapest Highflier
- Danzig Highflyer
- Nis' White-Tail Highflyer
- Serbian Highflier
- Stralsunder Highflier
- Szegediner Highflier
- Vienna Highflier

== See also ==
- High Flyers (disambiguation)
