= Epiphone 5102T / EA-250 =

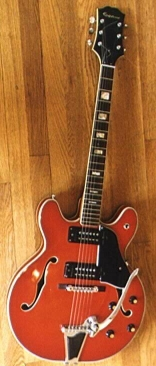
1970 Epiphone 5102T

An archtop electric guitar manufactured by Matsumoku and sold 1970 to 1974 or '75 in the United States under the Epiphone brand. Matsumoku also manufactured the nearly identical Univox Coily guitar and several related guitars sold under the Univox brand.

Gibson, the owner of Epiphone since the late 1950s, abandoned manufacturing of Epiphone-branded instruments in 1969 and started importing Epiphone-branded instruments from the Matsumoku company in 1970. These instruments were not based on previous Epiphone or Gibson designs.

The 5102T was among these first imported Epiphone instruments. It came in one color—redburst, had a maple laminate body (nearly hollow: just a 3/4" square block from top to bottom below the bridge), maple bolt-on neck, two doublecoil pickups with black plastic covers and "staple" poles alongside screw poles, and a vibrato operating similarly to a Bigsby vibrato.

Subsequent years brought changes: the pickups became more like Gibson pickups and gained chrome covers, a trapeze tailpiece became available, the "pitchfork" Epiphone logo was added to the pickguard—and, in 1972, the model designation changed to EA-250. In the same period Matsumoku also made a companion short-scale bass, the 5120 / EA-260. In 1975 or '76 the guitar was replaced by the ET-255. In addition to the change from the original black plastic dual-coil Humbucker pick-ups, this guitar was altered into the EA-250 Riviera, and re-introduced with single coil pick-ups covered with the standard two coil Humbucker pick-up covers. This was a unique element on this guitar model. To identify the style, you can look at the paper label glued inside the body of the guitar under the top f-hole. It should read EA-250 Riviera Epiphone Kalamazoo, Michigan Made in Japan. The paper is light blue in color on an authentic model, and the serial number is on the back metal neck plate. It is not possible to determine the exact year of these guitars, but it is generally accepted that the Matsumoku factory built these guitars between 1970 and 1975. It is believed that the neck plate number may reveal the approximate date of manufacture. If the neck plate number is 070512. The 0 is 1970 the 7 is the seventh week of 1970 and the 0512 is the production number it was 512th made in 1970. The first number indicates the year. 0=1970. 1=1971. etc.
