= Stralsund Highflyer =

Breed of pigeon

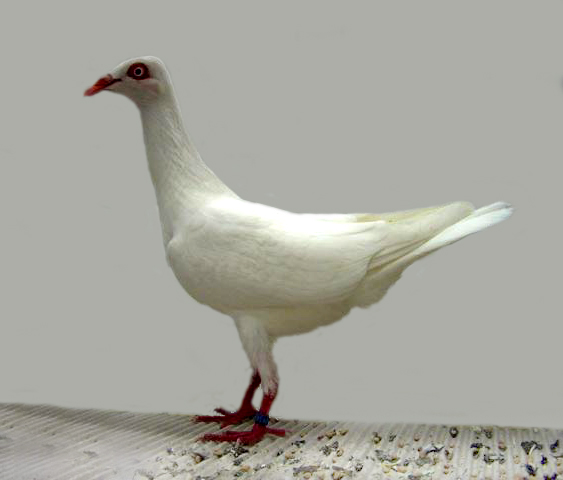
Stralsund Highflyer

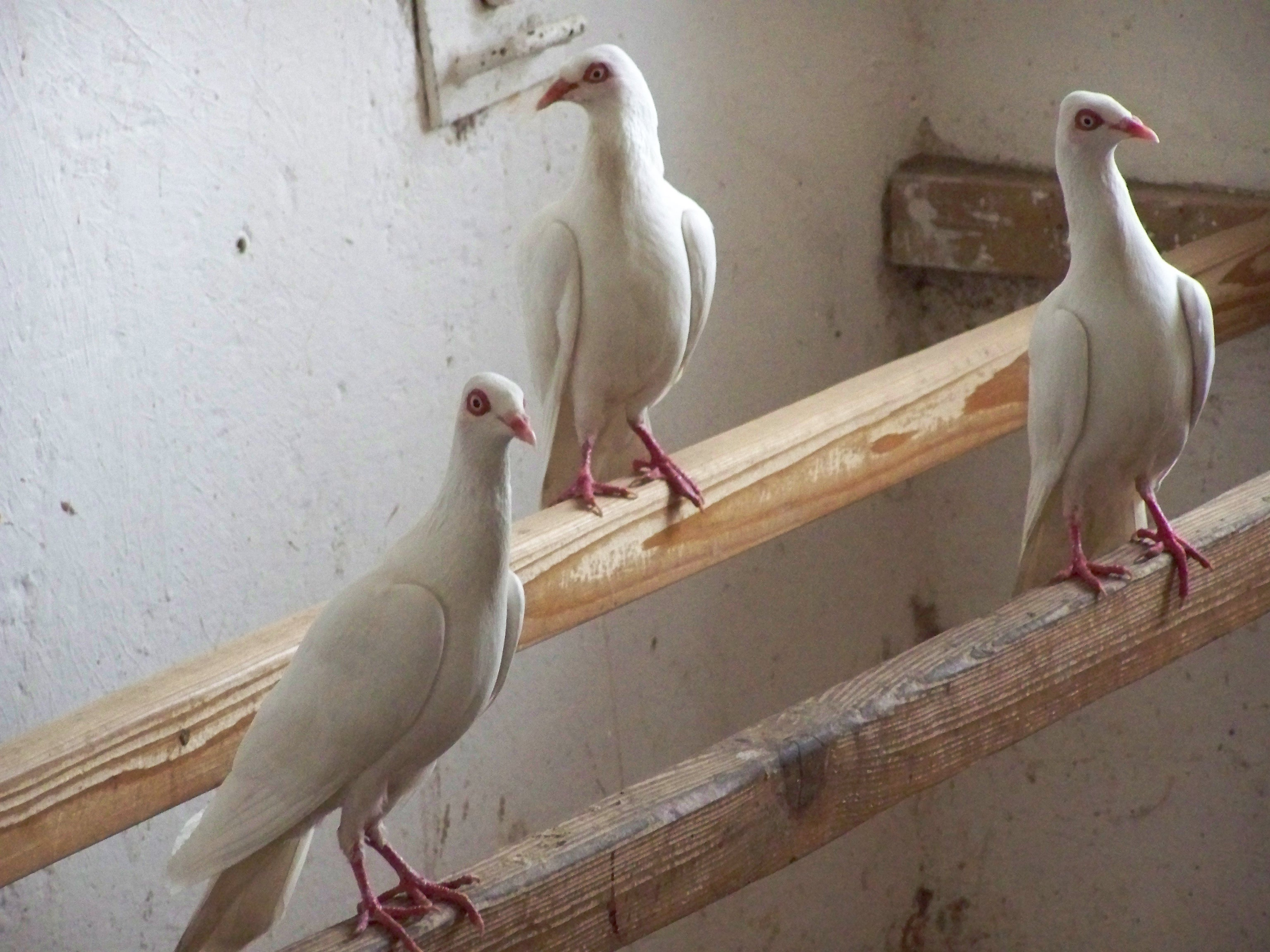
The breed in the Stralsund zoo

The Stralsund Highflyer (German: Stralsunder Hochflieger) is a breed of fancy pigeon developed over many years of selective breeding. Stralsund Highflyers, along with other varieties of domesticated pigeons, are all descendants from the rock pigeon (Columba livia).

== History ==
It was notably studied during the 19th century by Heinrich Bodinus. The breed emerged in Pomerania, where Stralsund, Germany is located, and was developed from the French Cumulet. It is renowned for its high flight, making it a popular bird for competitions and exhibitions.

== See also ==
- List of pigeon breeds
