= Electra Guitars =

Brand of electric guitars

Electra
- Type: Private
- Industry: Musical Instruments
- Founded: 1971
- Products: Electric Guitars and Bass Guitars

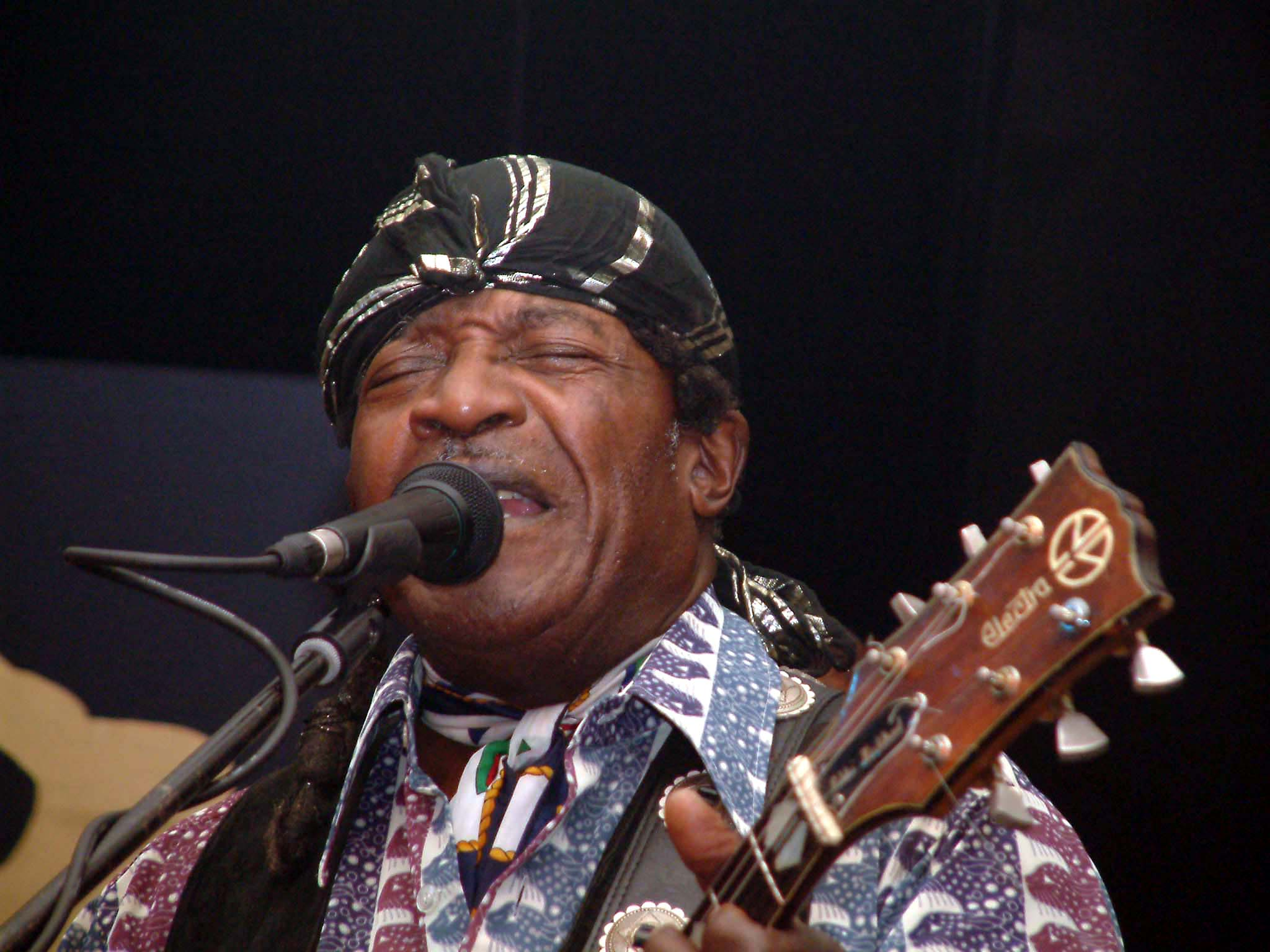
Electra guitar played by Eddie Kirkland

Electra was a brand of electric guitars and basses manufactured in Japan and distributed in the US by two companies owned by brothers: Saint Louis Music (SLM) and Pacific Coast Music in the 1970s and early 1980s. In 2013, the brand launched a successful comeback led by renowned luthiers Ben Chafin and Mick Donner.

Unlike most other brands of imported guitars which were sourced from a single manufacturer, Electra guitars were ordered from all the Japanese factories and distributors. As a result, early models especially vary in details and quality. Later, as all models came to be made by Matsumoku, Electra guitars offered high quality at competitive prices. However, the brand never entirely lost its association with inexpensive 'copy' guitars and the brand name was transitioned to Electra Westone in 1984 and Westone in 1985. The same qualities make them popular among collectors today.

In 2013 Ben Chafin, former head luthier at Dean Guitars, acquired the rights to Electra Guitars and is now producing new Electra Guitars. The first model available was a reissued and updated single cutaway Electra Omega, followed by the Omega Prime. After rave reviews and a growing roster of artist endorsements, Electra Guitars unveiled a number of new models in 2014, including the Invicta, Talon, Phoenix H & S Guitars and the Phoenix Bass. More about the current company and their guitars, basses, accessories and merchandise can be found at their official website, Electra Guitars.

== MPC Guitars ==
In 1976 Electra MPC (Modular Powered Circuits) models featured a pair of cartridge slots in the guitar body, which allowed effect modules to be plugged in and controlled from the front of the guitar. Today the unusual thing is that the effects are on board, but even offering electronic effects to consumer musicians was fairly new at the time and offers an interesting alternate way to do it. There were a total of 18 guitar models which carried MPC circuits. The most notable was the Super Rock, which was a Les Paul copy. There were 12 total MPC modules offered.

== Table of MPC modules ==
1	Phase Shifter
2	Dynamic Fuzz
3	Treble & Bass Expander
4	Tank Tone
5	Power Overdrive
6	Filter Follower
7	Auto Wah
8	Tube Sound
9	Octave Box
10	Flanger
11	Frog Nose
12	Compressor

In the assortment of modules offered was a "Mini Amp" module, which contained no effects but was a headphone amplifier for the guitar. This mini amp was actually the number 11 Module, Frog Nose. It did nothing except send a fairly weak clean guitar signal to headphones via the jack.

== Endorsers of Electra guitars and basses ==
- Peter Frampton - Peter Frampton's Official Site
- Leslie West
- Electric Light Orchestra
- Allen "Free Bird" Collins of Lynyrd Skynyrd
- Outlaws
- Rick Derringer's brand was the X910 guitar also known as the "Derringer" model
- Marty Friedman (uses in live performances/workshops etc.)
- Dickey Betts endorsed the X930 MPC model in the October 1981 issue of Guitar Player magazine.
- Aum Mu Ra -

== Sources ==
- "Electra History". Article from the original Electra fan site
- "MPC (wiring diagrams)". Details of MPC guitar wiring
- The Electra Guitar Collection 1977. 1977 full line catalog including MPC guitars and modules
