= Bodinus =

Bodinus is a surname. Notable people with the surname include:

- Sebastian Bodinus (c. 1700–1759), German composer
- Heinrich Bodinus (1814–1884), German zoologist
- Jean Bodin (Latinized) (1530–1596), French jurist and philosopher
