= Uni-Vibe =

Effects pedal

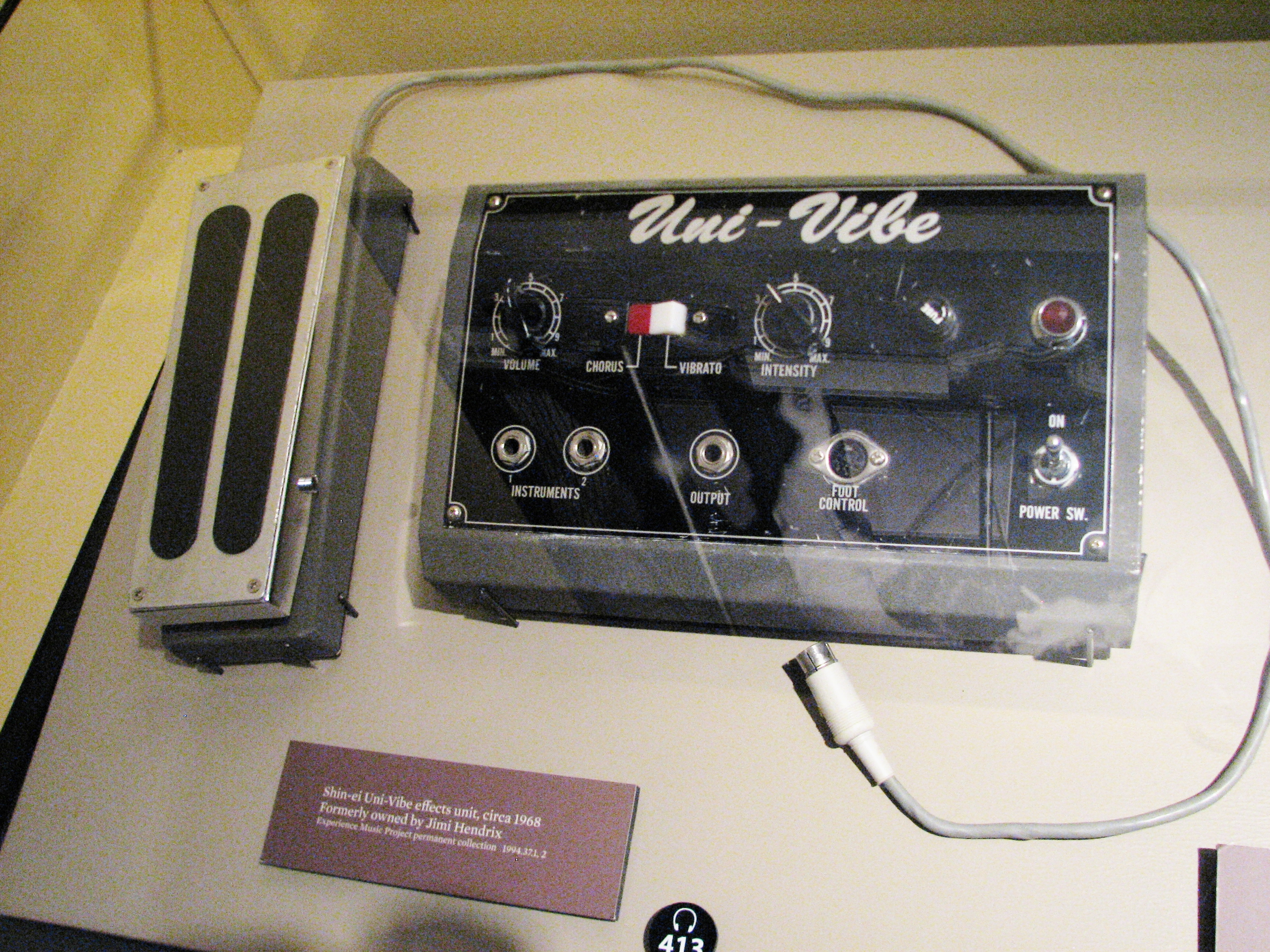
Jimi Hendrix's Uni-Vibe

The Uni-Vibe, also marketed as the Jax Vibra-Chorus, is a footpedal-operated phaser, or phase shifter, for creating chorus and vibrato simulations for electric organ or guitar. Designed by audio engineer Fumio Mieda, it was introduced in the 1960s by Japanese company Shin-ei (at the time Honey) originally branded as the Vibra-Chorus. The effect (renamed Uni-Vibe) was modified to have easier access to its fuse, and a speed control foot pedal was added. It was later released in North America by Univox in 1968.

It is commonly thought the Uni-Vibe is intended to emulate the "Doppler sound" of a Leslie speaker. However Fumio Mieda revealed in an interview the effect was based on hearing radio signals (like Radio Moscow) undergoing “atmospheric modulation”. The effect has made its mark on tracks like Robin Trower's "Bridge of Sighs", Jimi Hendrix's "Machine Gun" and Pink Floyd's "Breathe".

== Overview ==
The effect, though often associated with chorus, is in fact created through a staggered series of phasing filters and an optical circuit utilizing LDRs (Light Dependent Resistor) and an incandescent bulb inside a light shield with a reflective interior, unlike the usually aligned filters of a normal phasing effect. Unlike most other phaser pedals, this is achieved without the use of op-amps.

The Uni-Vibe phase shifter was known for its throbbing, hypnotic pulse and lo-fi sweep. These unique effects set it apart from other modulation-type effects at the time.

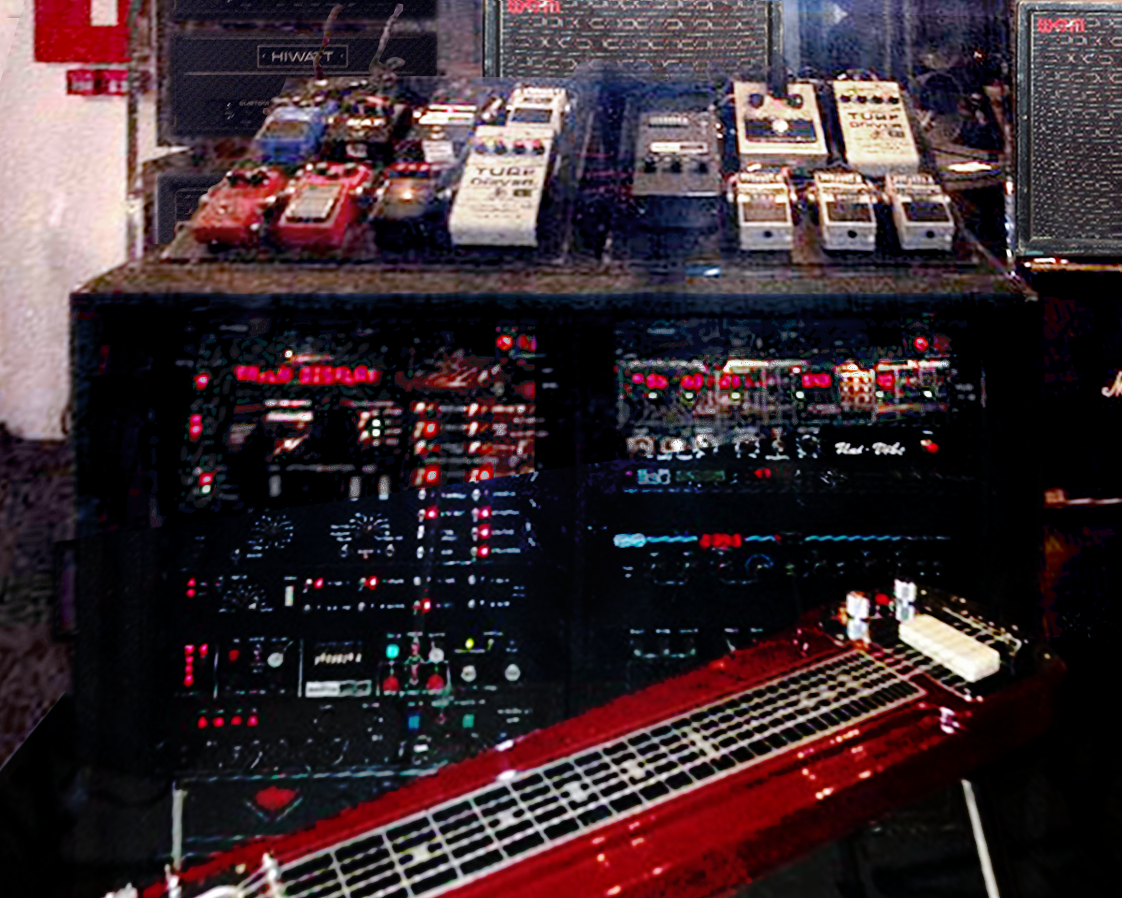
rack mount modified Uni-Vibe (right mid) on David Gilmour's effects rack. (exhibited at Expo Pink Floyd)

The Shin-ei Uni-Vibe was also sold as a Univox product.

As of 2020, "Uni-Vibe" is a registered trademark of Dunlop Manufacturing, Inc.

Notable users of the Uni-Vibe have included Jimi Hendrix, Robin Trower, Trey Anastasio, and David Gilmour.
