= Univox 'Lectra =

Model of bass guitar

The Univox 'Lectra was a bass guitar made by Univox modeled originally on the Höfner 500/1 bass, popularized by Paul McCartney in the early days of the Beatles, and later on the Gibson EB-1, both violin shaped guitars. The bass was available from the late 1960s through the mid-1970s.

The 'Lectra had a 22 fret bolt on neck and a hollow body. The original model had two pickups, while some of the models based on the Gibson EB-1 had one. Some later models had f-holes cut into the body as well.

Finishes ranged from sunburst or tobacco burst to all black.
