= Westone (guitars) =

Former guitar brand used by various manufacturers

Westone Guitars
- Product type: Electric and acoustic guitars, basses
- Current owner: Matsumoku (Japan); St. Louis Music (US)
- Introduced: c. 1976
- Discontinued: 1991; 35 years ago (with some subsequent revivals)
- Markets: Asia
- Registered as a trademark in: Japan, United States

Westone is a brand of musical instruments that has been used by various manufacturers of electric and acoustic guitars and basses. The name gained wide recognition in the mid-1970s and early-1980s when Matsumoku in Japan and USA-based instrument distributor St. Louis Music began marketing guitars under the brand. After production by Matsumoku ceased in 1987, the brand continued to be distributed by St. Louis Music in the United States and FCN Music for the UK and European markets, with guitars built in South Korea by Samick.

== History ==
The first guitars to bear the Westone name were made by manufacturers in East Germany and Italy until 1975, when Japanese company Matsumoku acquired the rights to the Westone name, producing acoustic guitars and copies of some US models.

St. Louis Music registered the Westone mark in the United States in 1976 to market Matsumoku instruments in the country. They began importing the Westone-branded guitars to the United States as a replacement for their previous line of Custom Kraft–brand instruments manufactured for them by Kay and Valco since the mid-1950s.

Electra was also a brand of St. Louis Music. In 1984, they merged both brands to make the "Electra-Westone" brand, before dropping "Electra" from the name entirely from 1985 onwards. The majority of Westone guitars of the 1980s were made by the Matsumoku factory in Japan and imported by St. Louis Music. With Matsumoku ceasing operations in 1987, production was moved to Korea in 1988 and most of the innovative models disappeared. St. Louis Music replaced the Westone brand name by Alvarez in 1991.

Though initially popularized as inexpensive, entry-level guitars particularly useful for students, the transition to Asian manufacturing in the 80s brought a fundamental change in production, with designers emphasizing features such as custom pickups and electronics. Many Westone guitars and basses have since become collector's items.

In 1998, renowned luthier Sid Poole built some prestige guitars in England under the Westone name. Another revival of the brand came in 2010 when German company Musik-Meyer began producing Weston-branded copies of traditional instruments from other companies, such as the Fender Stratocaster, Fender Telecaster and Gibson Les Paul. In China, manufacturers have also commercialized copies of traditional US guitars with the Westone brand.

== Models ==
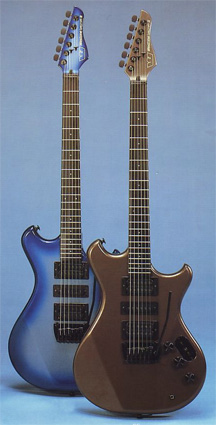
Spectrum

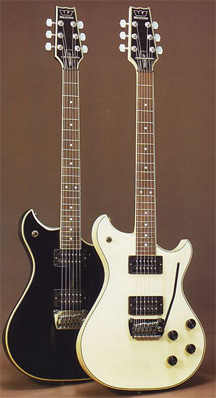
Prestige

- Challenger
- Clipper Six
- Concord
- Corsair
- Dana
- Dimension
- Dynasty
- Genesis
- Monark
- Paduak
- Pantera
- Phoenix
- Prestige
- Raider
- The Rail
- Rainbow
- Spectrum
- Thunder
- Villain

== Users ==
Notable musicians who have used Westone models includes:

- Georgia South (Nova Twins)
- Trevor Rabin (Rabbitt and Yes)
- Tim Smith (Cardiacs)
- Ian Masters (Pale Saints)
- Leslie West (Mountain)
- Kirk Pengilly (INXS)
- Isaac Brock (Modest Mouse)
- Gabriel Saloman (Yellow Swans)
- Martin Kemp (Spandau Ballet)
- Dave Brock (Hawkwind)
- Eric Brittingham (Cinderella)
- Steve Lynch (Autograph)
- Scott von Mehrens (Von Mehrens)
- Craig Scanlon (The Fall)
- Justin Broadrick (Napalm Death and Godflesh)
- Cronos (Venom)
- Mantas (Venom)
- Varg Vikernes (Burzum)
- Abbath (Immortal)
- Morgan Håkansson (Marduk)
- Wroth (Darkspace)

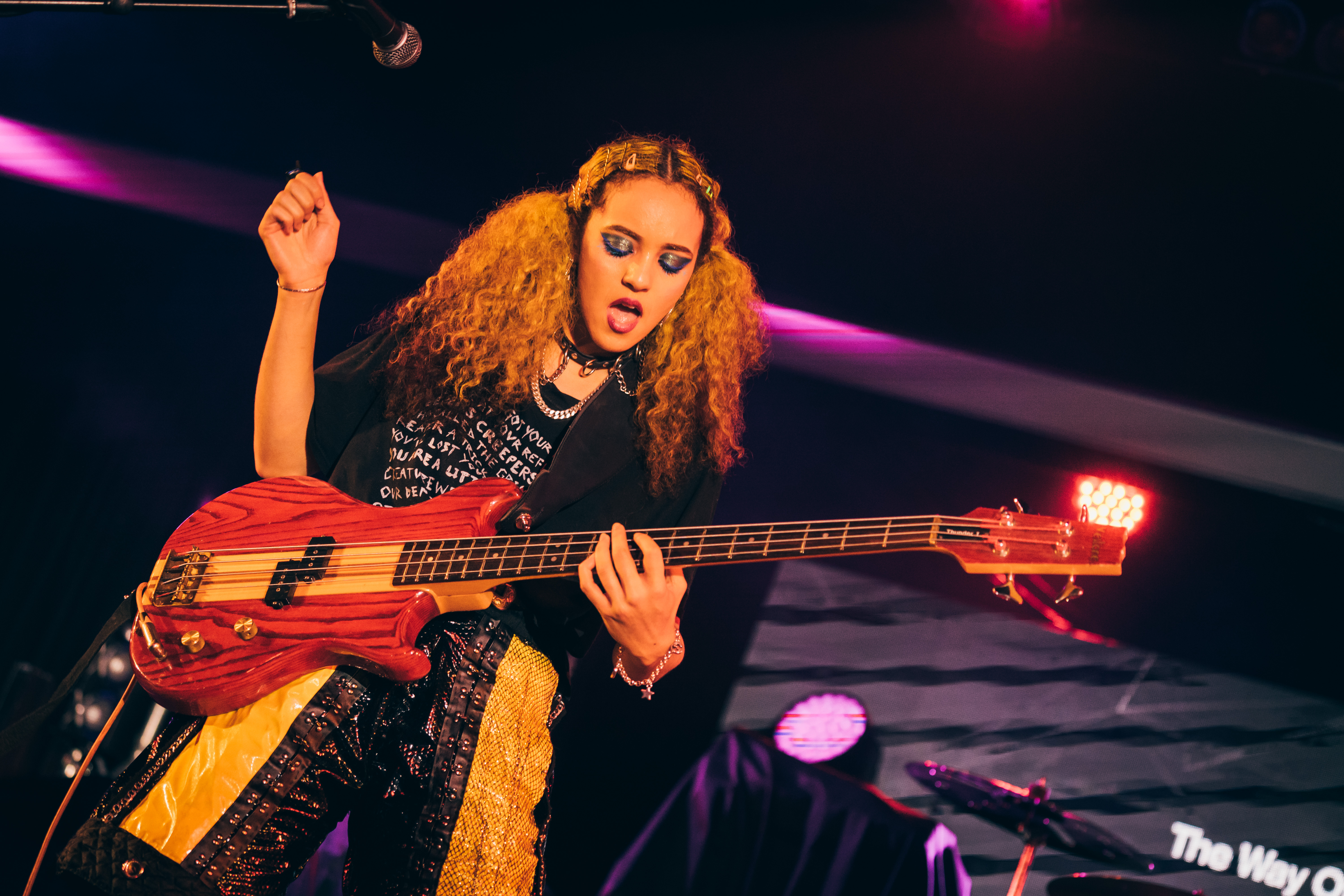
Georgia South playing a Westone Thunder bass
