= High Flyers =

High Flyers may refer to:

- High Flyers (film), a 1937 musical comedy film
- High Flyers (Singaporean TV series), a business-themed television interview program
- High Flyers (Australian TV series), a children's television series
- High Flyers: The Best of Trapeze, a compilation album by the band Trapeze
- Yamhill High Flyers, an International Basketball League team

== See also ==
- Highflyer (disambiguation)
