= Univox =

Company in the Czech Republic

- Company type: Private
- Industry: Musical instruments
- Founded: 1960; 66 years ago
- Founder: Thomas Walter Jennings
- Defunct: 1987; 39 years ago
- Headquarters: Westbury, New York, United States
- Area served: Global
- Products: Electric and acoustic guitars Bass guitars Amplifiers; Electronic keyboards Effects units
- Parent: Korg
- Website: VintageUnivox.com (archive site)

Univox was a musical instrument brand of Unicord from the early 1960s, when they purchased the Amplifier Corporation of America of Westbury, New York, and began to market a line of guitar amplifiers. Univox also distributed guitars by Matsumoku, effects units by Shin-Ei Companion, and synthesizers by Crumar and Korg.

In 1985, the Wickes Companies sold Unicord to Korg, and the Univox brand was phased out, later revived by Jam Industries.

== History ==
In 1964, Unicord (a manufacturer of electric transformers acquired by Gulf and Western Industries in 1959) purchased the Amplifier Corporation of America and began marketing a line of amplifiers under the name of Univox.

Unicord had begun as a manufacturer of electrical transformers. When the original Marshall amplifiers came to the U.S., Unicord's engineers were concerned that the output transformers could not reliably handle the full output. Unicord redesigned the output transformers and told Marshall to use the Unicord design in all units shipped to the U.S., and Marshall could use the design outside the U.S. if they wanted to. Marshall did adopt the Unicord design for all their tube amps.

Tony Frank, the design engineer at Unicord, created the dual-volume-control two-stage pre-amp that Marshall introduced with their 4140 and 2150 amplifiers, which allowed a "super-dirty" fuzz even at extremely low volumes.

Univox-branded fretted instruments (electric and acoustic guitars and electric basses) began being imported from Japanese contract manufacturer Matsumoku in 1968, In 1978 Unicord phased out the Univox line of guitars and equipment. They switched to an original guitar line called "Westbury", and an amp line called Stage which lasted until about 1982. The Unicord Corporation was purchased by Korg in 1985, effectively ending the line.

Univox was best known for its copies of instruments from better-known companies such as Fender, Gibson, Rickenbacker, Ampeg/Dan Armstrong, Epiphone and others. The Univox Hi-Flier was based loosely on the distinctive Mosrite "reverse swept" shape; it was popularized in the early 1990s by Kurt Cobain, almost two decades after original production had ceased.

In 1985, Unicord, including the Univox name, was purchased by Korg. Korg did not produce any products in the Univox line, and they did not renew their trademark. As a result, in 2002, Canadian company Jam Industries registered the Univox name and began producing musical products under the Univox brand, manufactured in China.

== Products ==
=== Univox amplifiers ===
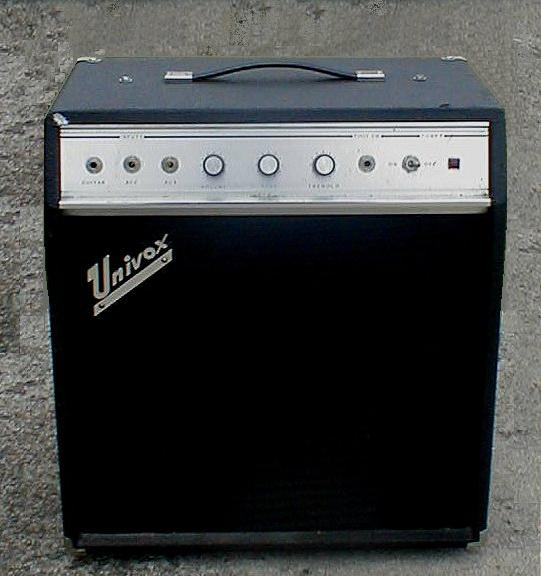
A Univox U45-B tube combo amplifier from the mid-1960s.

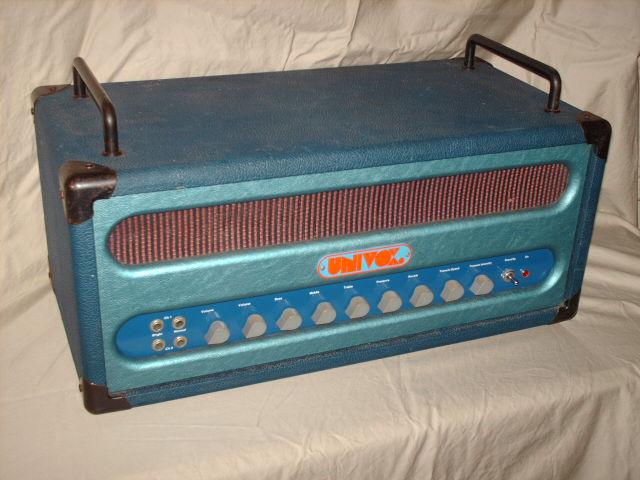
A Univox "B-Group" amp head from the early 1970s. Model: U-1011

A number of tube and solid-state amplifiers were produced by Univox over the years. These ranged from small practice combo amps to powerful heads with separate cabinets. Some models had built-in spring reverb and tremolo effects. In 1971, Univox introduced the B Group amplifiers, covered in two-toned blue or gray Tolex with distinctive ovaloid cosmetics. The C-Group (UX) line of amps were used by The Jeff Beck Group and Led Zeppelin.

=== Univox guitars ===
In 1962, Gulf and Western acquired Merson Musical Products, an importer of various headstock-brand guitars such as Tempo, Giannini and Hagström. Around 1968, they started producing Univox-branded guitars. Unicord and Merson split in 1975, but Unicord continued to make Univox guitars until about 1978, even adding some newer models.

==== Electric guitars ====
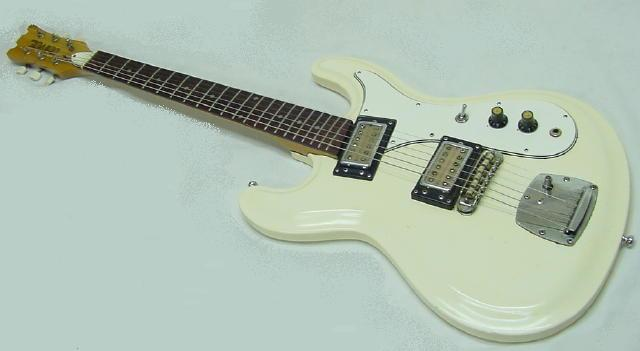
Univox Hi Flier Phase 3 guitar

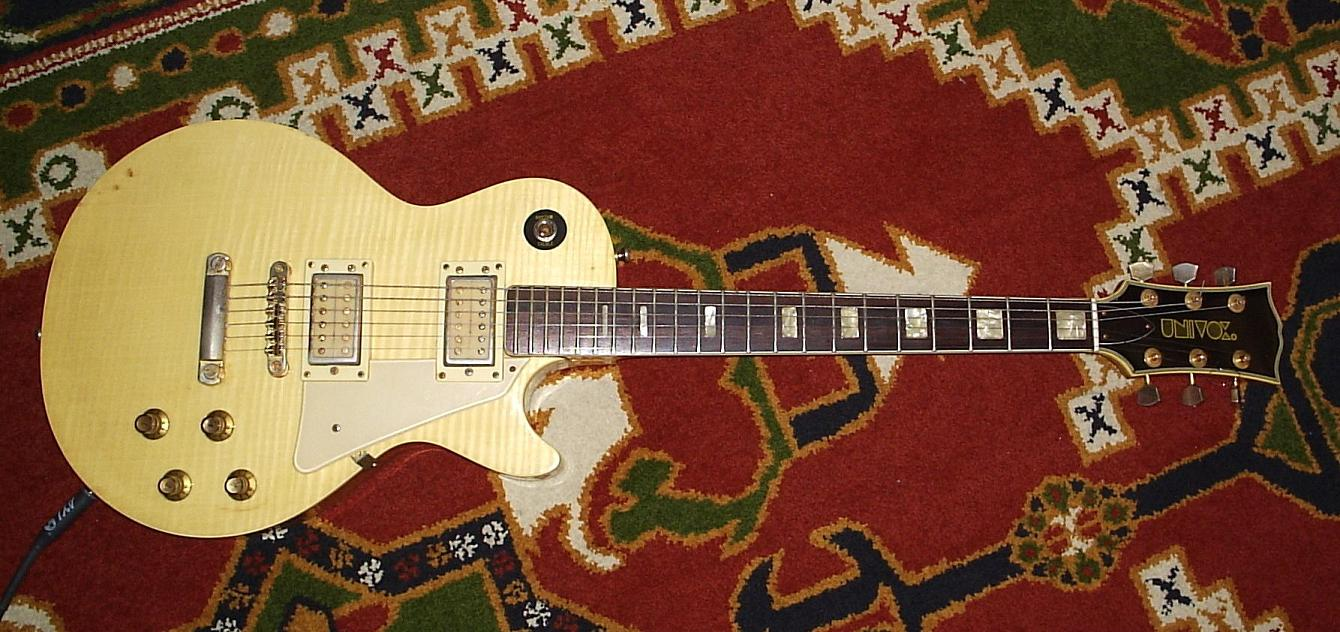
Univox Gimme guitar, natural finish

- Badazz
- Coily
- Custom
- Custom 335 (six and twelve-string versions)
- Deluxe
- eEagle
- Effie (six and twelve-string versions)
- Gimmie
- HR-2
- Hi-Flier
- Les Paul Copy (black and goldtop)
- Limited Edition Series (double-cut Les Paul Junior copy)
- Lucy
- Mother/Rhythm and Blues
- Pro (Jazzbix)
- Ripper
- Royce
- UC-2
- UC-3
- Westbury Standard
- Westbury Performer

==== Bass guitars ====
- Badazz
- Coily
- Hi-Flier
- Naked
- Precisely
- Eagle
- Professional
- Stereo
- UB-1
- 'Lectra

==== Acoustic guitars ====
- Auditorium
- Artist Series
- Dove
- 'Grass

=== Univox keyboards ===
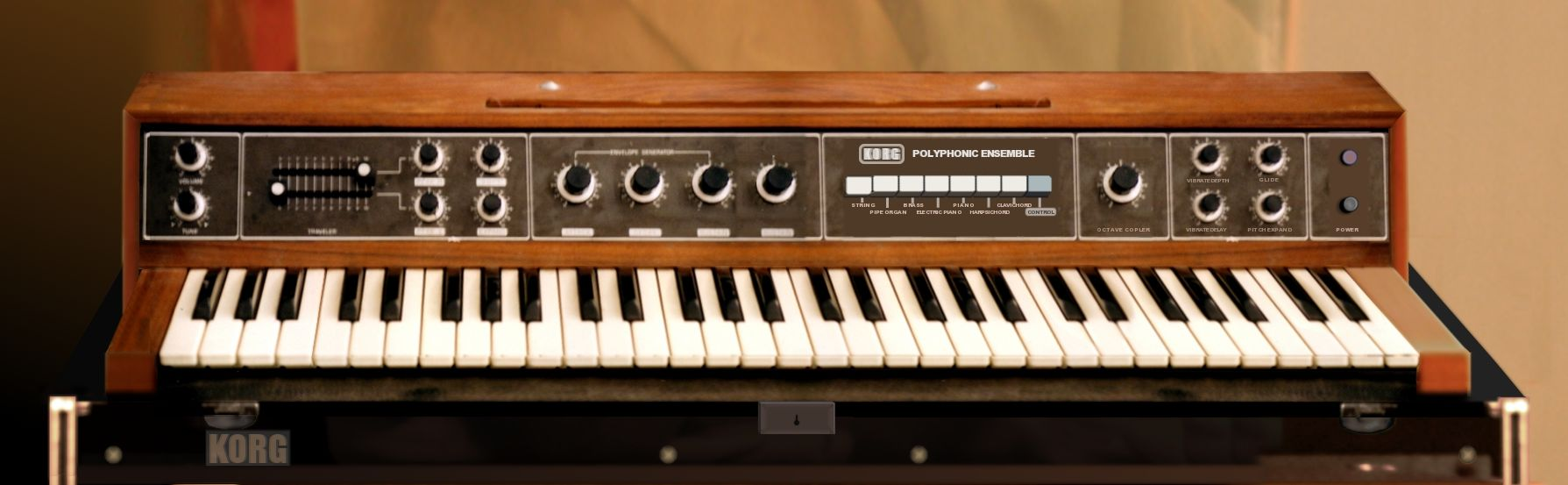
Univox K4 (1976, Korg PE-1000)

- Univox K4
- Univox MaxiKorg K3
- Univox MiniKorg K1/K2
- Univox Stringman (see "link". Archived from the original on 2010-12-19.)

=== Univox Drum Machines ===
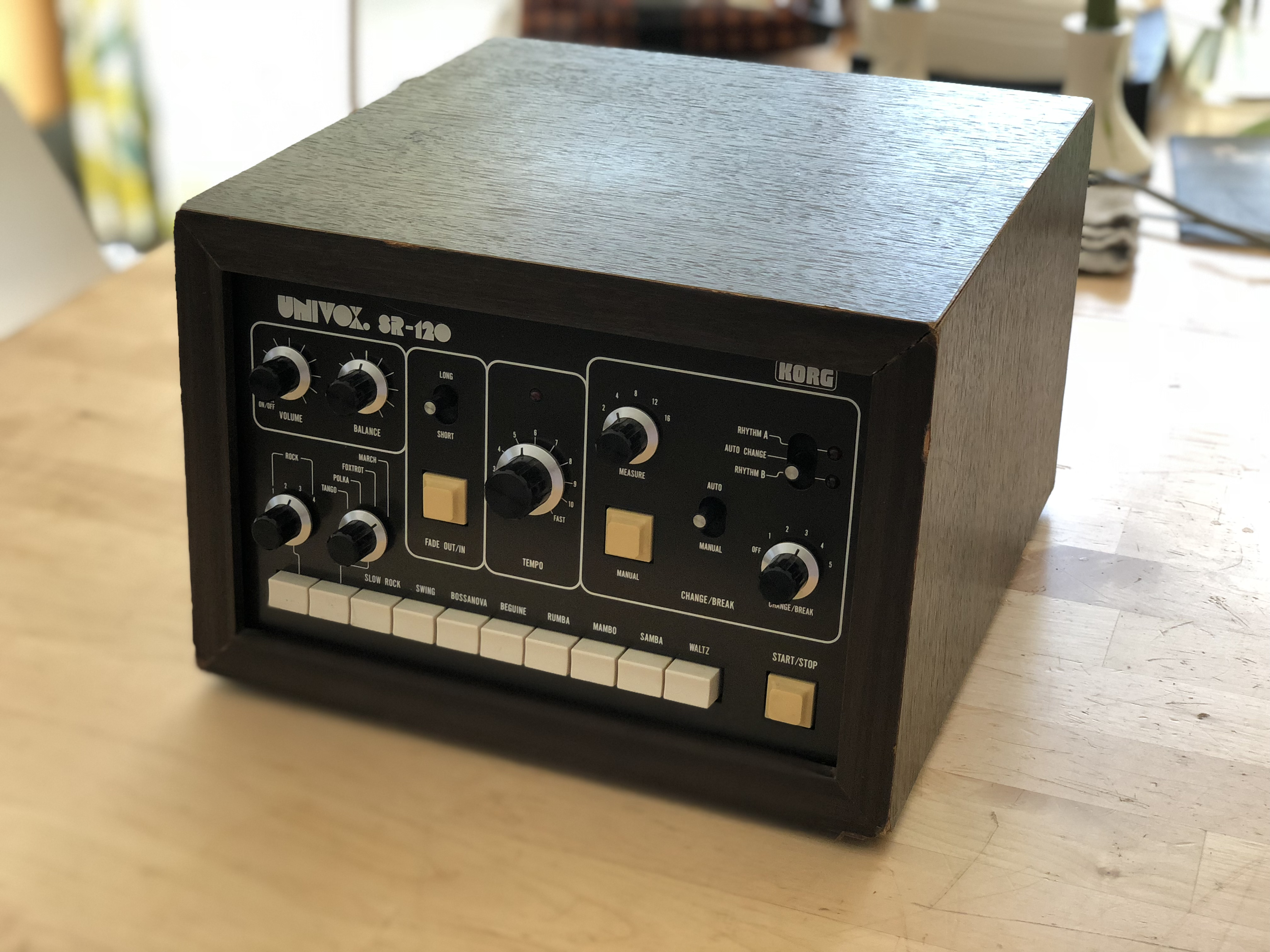
Univox Mini-Pops SR-120 (mid-1970s)

- Univox JR-4
- Univox SR-55
- Univox SR-95
- Univox SR-120

=== Univox effects ===
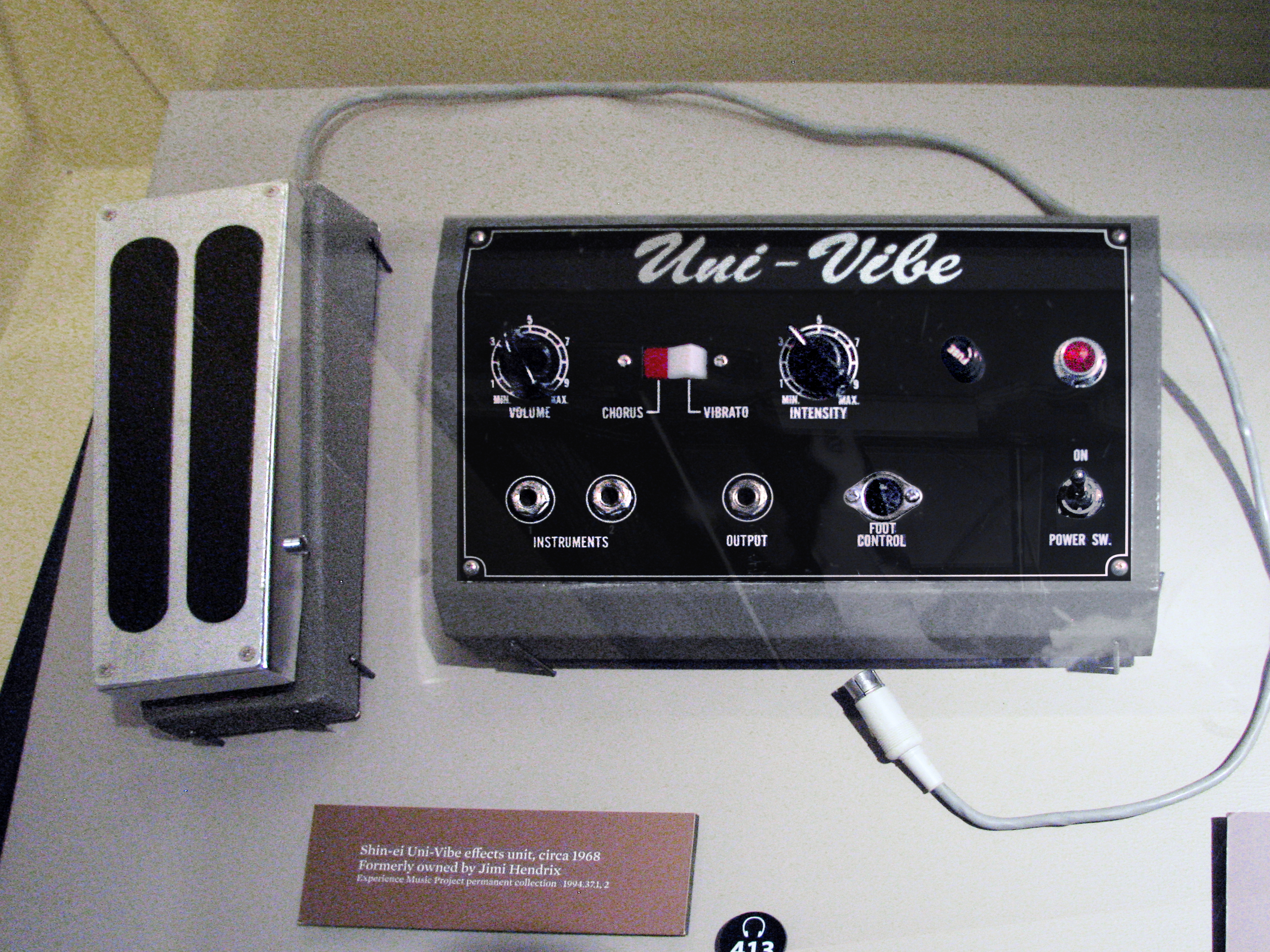
Uni-Vibe (ca.1968) formerly owned by Jimi Hendrix

Univox had many effects units, generally made by Shin-Ei, but perhaps their most well known was the Super-Fuzz Pedal, used by Pete Townshend. Univox also produced the Uni-Vibe, a chorus/vibrato that attempted to emulate a Leslie speaker effect, popularized by Jimi Hendrix.
