= Univox Hi-Flier =

Electric guitar

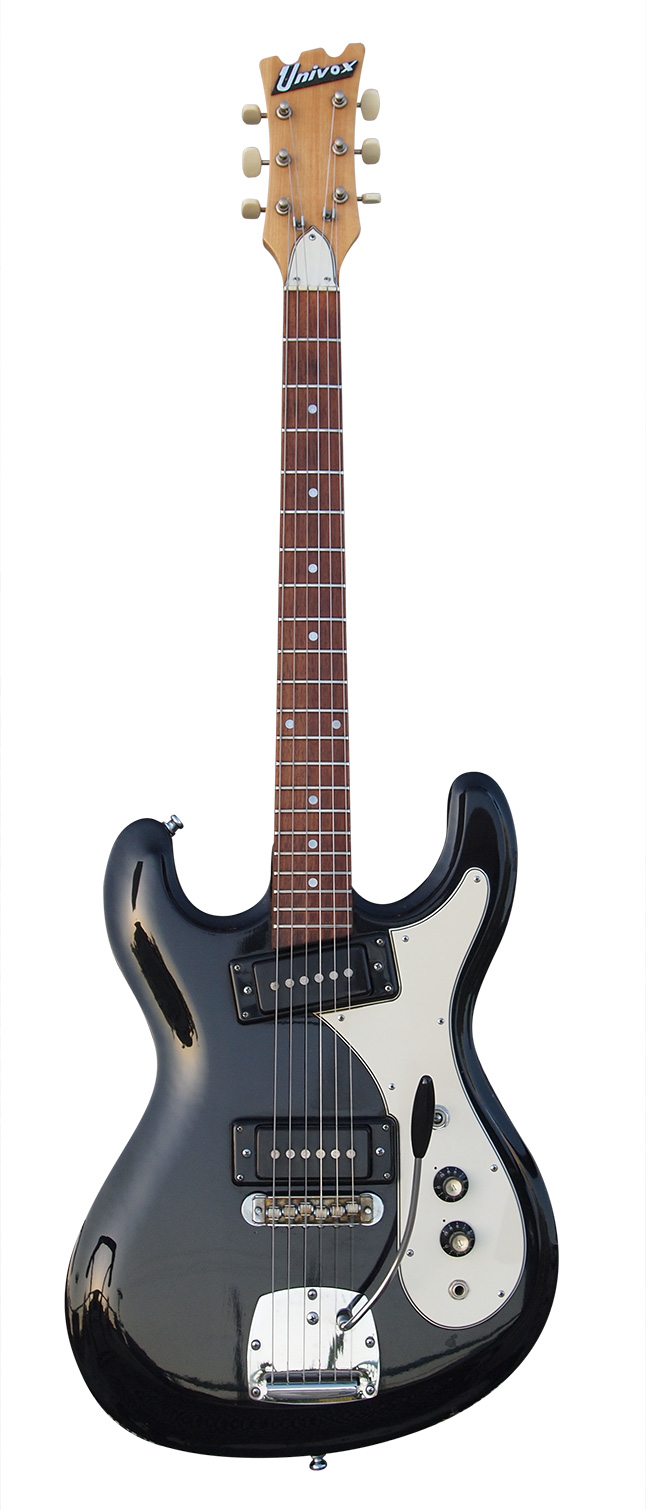
- Phase II Univox Hi-Flier
- Manufacturer: Univox
- Period: 1967 — 1980

Construction
- Body type: Solid
- Neck joint: Bolt-on

Woods
- Body: Plywood, Poplar
- Fretboard: Rosewood, maple

Hardware
- Bridge: Tune-o-matic style with Jaguar-style Tremolo (Phase 1-3); Stoptail (Phase 4)
- Pickup: Two single-coil pickups (Phase 1-2) Two humbuckers (Phase 3-4)

Colors available
- Orange sunburst, black, white, natural

The Univox Hi-Flier is an electric guitar marketed and sold by Univox (later Unicord) from roughly 1967 to 1980. With its reversed offset body, the Hi-Flier has an intentional resemblance to the Mosrite Ventures model. A bass version of the Hi-Flier was also available.

== Phases ==
The Hi-Flier went through many changes, generally divided into four "phases." However, the changes that define these have "transitional" periods, where characteristics from an older phase carry over into early production of a new phase. It is impossible to date these guitars by the serial number as it is uncertain whether records were kept on their production.

=== Phase One/Phase One Custom ===
The Hi-Flier model debuted in 1967, with two single-coil pickups that superficially resemble P-90 pickups, but have distinct construction. The design is loosely based on the body shape of the Mosrite Mark 1 and its later iterations, though with a thinner and much lighter body. The top of the Hi-Flier headstock has two U-shaped cuts, echoing the three-notch "M" shape of the Mosrite. The pickguard shape and control layout also mimicked Mosrite.

The first Hi-Fliers have a three-tone sunburst finish, pearloid white pickguard and truss rod cover. These very early Hi-Fliers are distinctly different from later models, having thicker bodies and necks, a "bar" type string tree that covers all six strings, larger fret markers for all frets except the two on the twelfth fret, dual black rocker switches on the pickguard, and a raised chromed-metal (with a painted black background) "Univox" headstock logo.

In 1968, a limited special version, the Hi-Flier Custom, was produced. With this new model, a black finish was offered along with the standard sunburst finish. (Rarely, white finish and green burst finish also, can be found in U.S.) These are very similar to the earliest Hi Fliers, except that they have a red tortoiseshell pickguard and truss rod cover, often slimmer neck/body (which became standard for all Hi-Fliers around this time period), and a badge that reads "Univox Custom."

In addition, there were Hi-Fliers made that have all the characteristics of the Custom version, but are fitted with a standard "Univox" badge, with no Custom tag. This is likely due to the Hi-Flier Custom being created simply to use leftover stock badges from a previous Univox Custom model (a hollowbody 335-type guitar built in the early 1960s). The factory presumably had many badges left over, and used them on the Hi-Fliers until they ran out, returning to the standard "Univox" badge.

=== Phase Two ===
In 1971, a redesign retained the single-coil pickups but included the following changes:

- string trees changed to separate metal pieces
- fret markers smaller, and uniform in size
- three-way toggle switch replacing the earlier rocker switches
- addition of white finish (options were now: sunburst, black, white)
- pickguard no longer pearloid or tortoise shell, but rather plain white three-layer (w/b/w)
- midway through production of the Phase Two models, the headstock logo was changed from the Metal "Univox" logo to a 1970s-style block-letter "UNIVOX" silk screened logo under the lacquer finish between the tuners. This would remain for the rest of production.

=== Phase Three ===
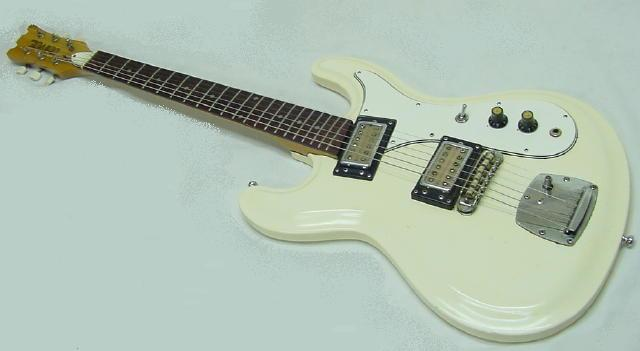
Univox Hi-Flier Phase III guitar

In 1974, the Hi-Flier was updated with a new finish option (Natural). Twin humbuckers in black plastic surround rings replaced the single-coil pickups. These pickups were already in production for the Ripper (Strat copy) and Gimme (Les Paul style). They are extremely high output pickups, with a distinctive open-top cover and three-screw mounting. Though these humbuckers strayed significantly from the Mosrite design, their unique tone and high output have made this a sought-after version of the Hi Flier.

Production of the Hi-Flier reached its peak in the mid 1970s. Consequently, Phase Three Hi-Fliers are the most common variety found today.

In addition, the natural-finish guitars and many later Phase Three guitars (in Black) were fitted with maple fingerboards.

=== Phase Four ===
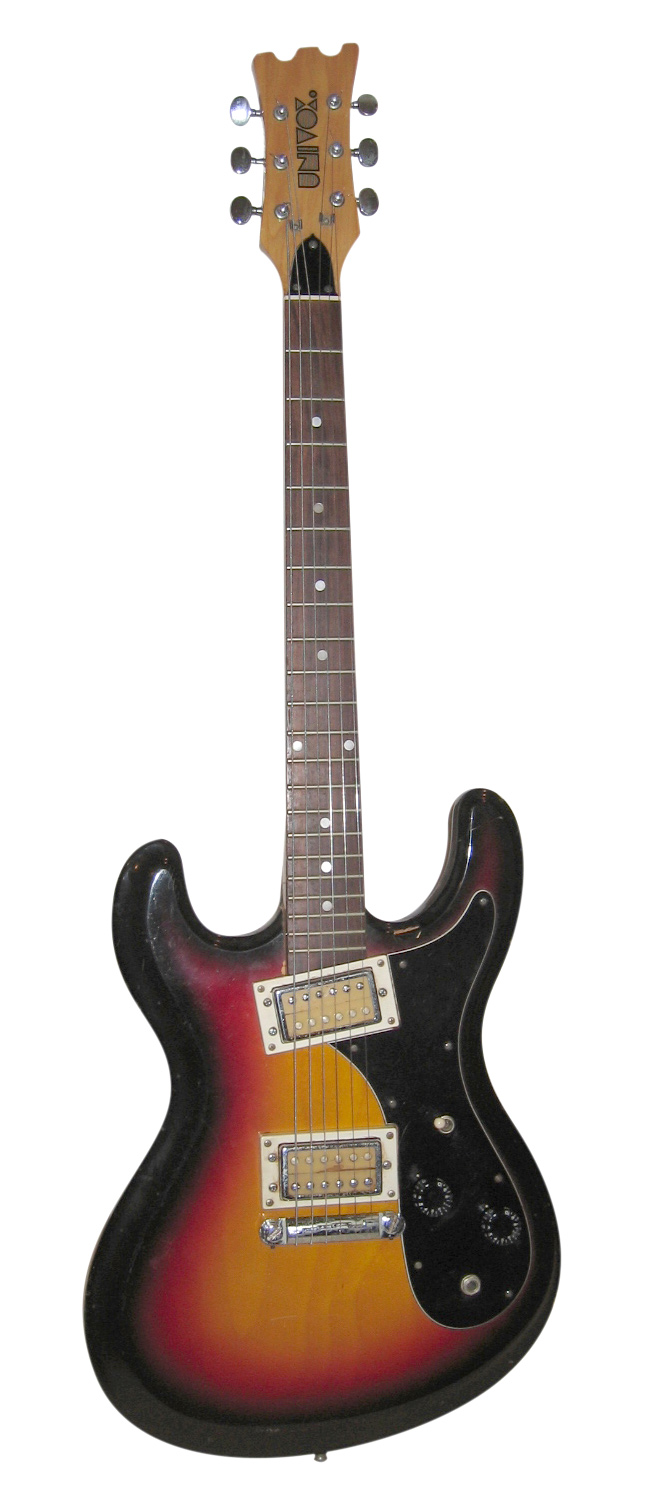
Hi-Flier Phase IV (1977) in sunburst

In 1977, the Hi-Flier was once again changed. The white and black guitars retained their white pickguards, while sunburst and natural guitars were fitted with black pickguards.

Many had the pickup surrounds in white plastic (from the previous standard black ). The knob layout was changed from in-line tone and volume knobs to a horizontally opposed knob layout. Knobs were also changed to speed style from the traditional top hat style.

Most prominently, Phase Four Hi-Fliers saw a hardtail Gibson-style stop-bar bridge/tailpiece replace the former Fender Jazzmaster-style separate vibrato and roller bridge setup.

In 1980, Univox discontinued the Hi-Flier.

== Notable Users ==
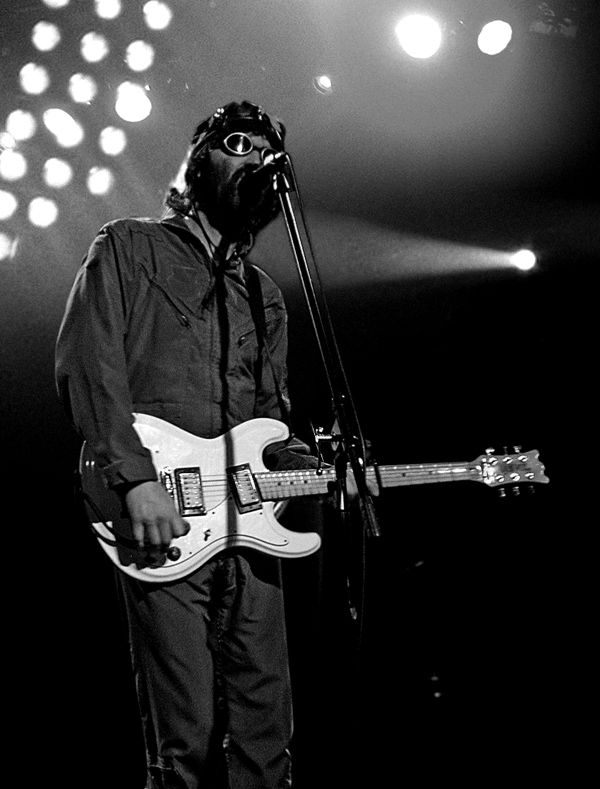
E of Eels playing a Phase IV Univox Hi-Flier.

- Kurt Cobain of Nirvana
- Lee Ranaldo of Sonic Youth
- Rych McCauley of tHrOaT oYsTeR / Veritas
- Dexter-X (Hayden Thais) formerly of Man or Astro-man?
- E (Mark Oliver Everett) of Eels
- Asa Osborne of Lungfish
- Joey Lennon of The Punkles
- Justin Trosper of Unwound
- Dimitri Coats of Off!
- Jimmy Flemion of The Frogs
- Olly Smith of The Vigil
- Som Wardner of My Vitriol

- Chris Summerlin of Hey Colossus, Felix and Lords
- Steve Five of The Library is On Fire

== Similar models ==
Univox guitars were produced by Japanese manufacturer Matsumoku, which built instruments for many brands, including Epiphone, Aria, Univox and later Westbury. They would often take a standard "house" model they made, and apply a variety of brand names to the same guitar, depending on the market the guitar was headed for. As a result, contemporary guitars identical to the Hi-Flier have been seen under various brands, including

- DeArmond — rocker switches, P90-style pickups, tortoiseshell pickplate, "DeArmond" on headstock as decal (black lettering) under clear finish
- Unicord — late models shipped to Canada. Raised plastic "Unicord" logo.
- Raven — very early models shipped to Canada. Identical to the Phase 1 Univox Custom except for a peculiar integrated bridge/tailpiece that was also used on the Epiphone ET-270. Raised plastic logo with raven bird
- Aria — part of Aria's "Diamond" series, as the 1702T model. Identical to Phase 1 and 2 Hi-Fliers with "ARIA Diamond" decal under the finish, perpendicular to the neck. Later models had the decal horizontally at the top of the headstock.
- DIA — possibly short for "Diamond." Identical to Phase 2 Hi-Flier, mostly sunburst, with an inlaid "DIA" logo or circular "Dia" decal.
- PAN — three types. An early version identical to a Phase 1 with a small black decal of a Pan figure playing a set of pan pipes, and "Pan" text. Another model was similar to a Phase 2 Hi-Flier with a gold decal the same as described previously. Later versions had an inlaid mother of pearl "PAN" logo, and were mostly sunburst Phase 2 models.

Modern copies include

- Danelectro The 64 — modified Phase 3, with switch high on pickguard, and Bigsby-style vibrato; double-coil pickup at bridge, P-90 style (in humbucker configuration) at neck. Also a bass version.
- Danelectro Hodad — similar body outline, but otherwise a three-pickup Danelectro-style instrument.
- Danelectro The 66 — related Mosrite-style semi-hollow version with shorter horns and F-hole.
- Eastwood Hi-Flier Custom — Phase 1 copy
- Eastwood Univox Hi-Flier — Phase 4
- Eastwood Hi-Flyer Phase 4
- Aria DM-380
- Aria DM-01
