= Serbian Highflyer =

Breed of pigeon

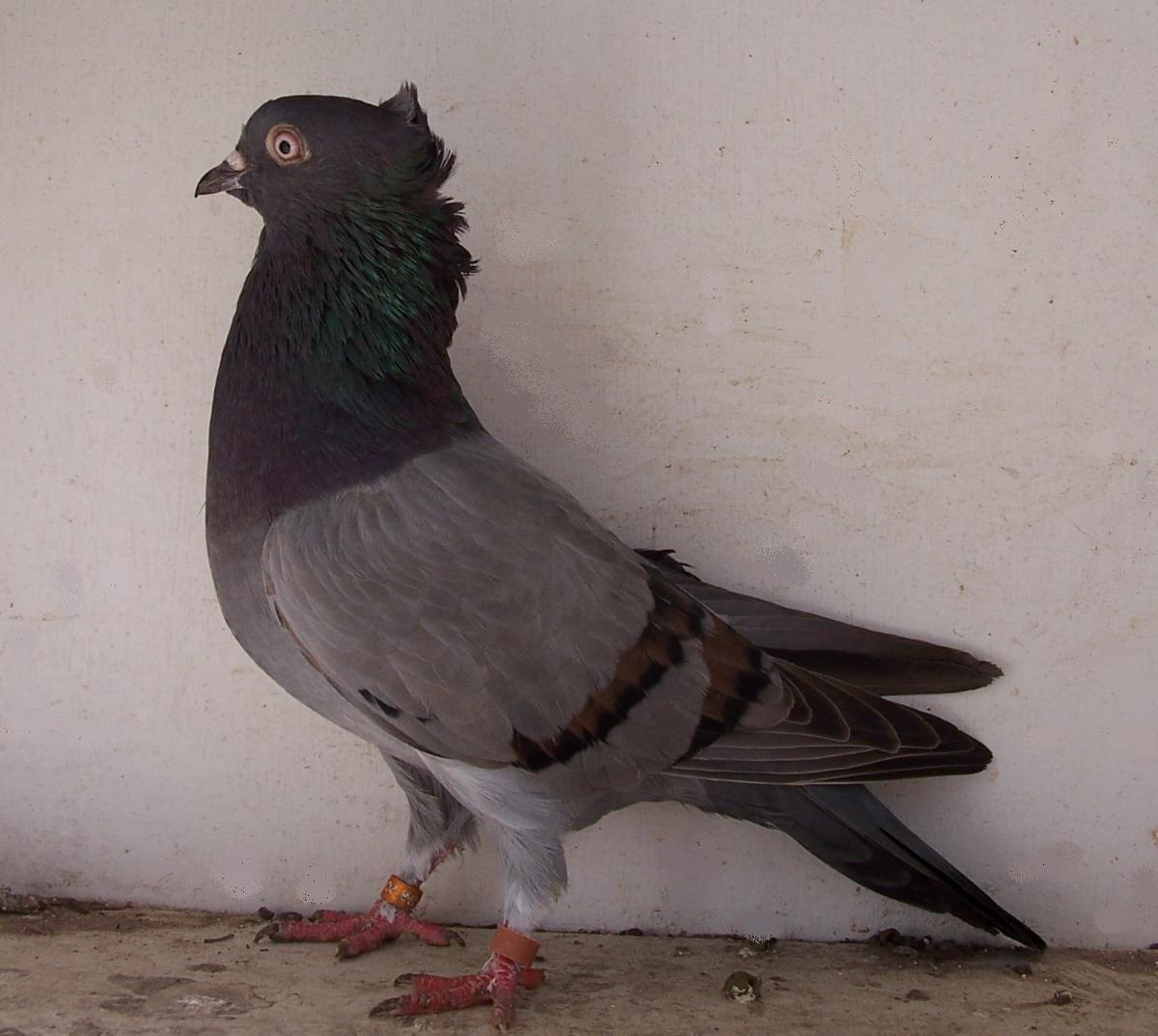
- Conservation status: Rare outside Serbia
- Country of origin: Yugoslavia

Classification

The Serbian Highflyer (Serbian: Српски високолетач) is a breed of domestic pigeon that is bred for endurance flying. The breed is characterized by long circle flights up to 15 hours. It can fly as high as 1,500 metres (4,900 ft). There are about 20,000 fanciers of this breed in Serbia.

== Origin ==
The breed originated in the city of Belgrade, Serbia, Yugoslavia. A relatively recent creation which is not mentioned by Wendell Levi in his text The Pigeon. Some evidence exists that the breed has descended from "The Illyrian Pigeon". This would make the Serbian Highflyer a relative of the Archangel pigeon, which has a similar body type. The crest (upturned feathers behind head) on the Archangel come to a "peak" whereas the crest of the Serbian Highflyer is best described as "spade" shaped. The breed is maintained mainly as a performance breed for its endurance and high flying ability, and as such is more akin to the Tippler pigeon. It does have a strong following in its country of origin where flying contests are organised. A rare breed outside its country of origin. There are some strong devotees among the high flying fraternity around the world. Not often seen as an exhibition pigeon. However a show standard has been adopted by the Australian National Pigeon Association.

== Description ==
The Standard of Excellence for the

Serbian Highflier

The most important attributes for this breed are:

a/ High flight

b/ Long flight

c/ Group and circled flight

d/ General appearance

General appearance:

Small to medium compact pigeon with flat vertical crest. Stance to be at a 45 degree angle. Lively appearance as if ready to fly.

Head:

Long and narrow with pronounced flatness on top. Forehead to angle down in line with the beak. Crest to be flat across back of skull reaching to just above top of head.

Beak:

Medium long angled downward and slightly curved. Top mandible to be in line with forehead. Stained in dark coloured birds. All others to be clear. Cere to be fine and coloured in accordance with colour of bird.

Body:

To be short and stout. Solid and well muscled. Short keel. Feathering to be tight with no gaps.

Eyes:

Pearl with as little gravel as possible. Eyes to be centered just in front of the middle of the skull. White or Baldheads may be Bull eyed. Ceres to be fine and coloured in accordance with colour of bird.

Neck:

Rather stout. Tapering slightly from body to head. Length of neck to be in proportion to body.

Tail:

Short and close with good webbing. 12 tail feathers carried just off the ground.

Wings:

Long, to reach tip of tail with strong and prominent wing butts. Carried above the tail. Flights broad and over-lapping with good cover.

Size:

170 to 255 grams (6-9 ounces). Short keeled.

Legs and Feet:

Clean legged. Skin to be red in colour.

Colours and Markings:

All colours and patterns are acceptable. Pattern not to affect quality.

Faults:

Feathers on legs, rounded head, over long or thin in body, long keel, overlarge size, eye colour other than pearl or bull in white and balds, more or less than 12 tail feathers, any evidence of being crossed to other breeds.

Ring Size:

Size B (8 mm)

== See also ==
- List of pigeon breeds
