= High flyer (fishing) =

High flyers, also known as long line high flyers, are vertical poles used by commercial fishermen that serve to locate the beginning and end of a long fishing line, used most often in tuna and swordfish fishing. Often constructed with a vertical marine grade aluminum pole which resists corrosion, they have a tapered fluted buoy to provide buoyancy, and the poles are about 6–9 feet (2–3 meters) high above the water. The counter-weight at the bottom is often a PVC pipe filled with concrete. The high flyer is tipped with an aluminum radar reflector that warns ships of a line between two high flyers.
