= Szegedin Highflyer =

Breed of pigeon

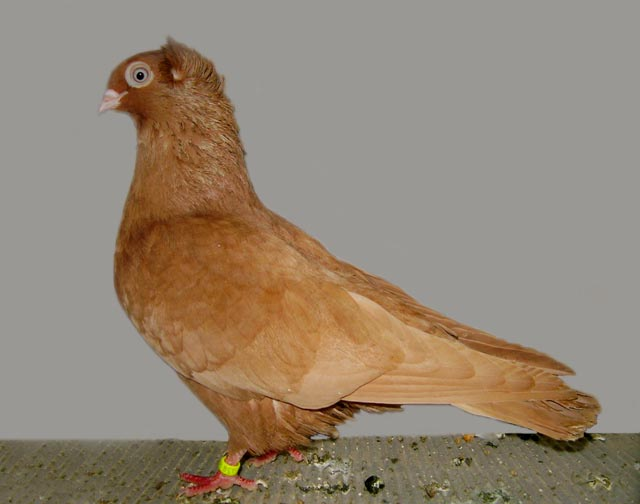
Szegedin Highflyer

The Szegedin Highflyer is a breed of fancy pigeon developed over many years of selective breeding. Szegedin Highflyers, along with other varieties of domesticated pigeons, are all descendants from the rock pigeon (Columba livia). The breed belongs to the Flying/Sporting pigeons group.

== Origin ==
The breed was developed in Hungary (Szeged and other cities). Originally brought up from the Orient. Also known as a crested Tippler.

== See also ==
- List of pigeon breeds
