= Aria (guitar company) =

Japanese musical instrument manufacturer

Aria Guitars Co.
- Type: Private
- Industry: Musical instruments
- Founded: 1956; 70 years ago
- Headquarters: Nagoya, Japan
- Area served: Global
- Key people: H.Noble / Noubuaki Hayashi
- Products: Guitars: electric, acoustic and classical; Electric basses; Ukuleles
- Brands: List: Laule'A; Mojo Gig Bags; Fiesta; José Antonio; Pignose; Kelii; Blitz
- Website: ariaguitars.com

Aria Guitars Co. is a Japanese manufacturer of musical instruments. The company, sited in the city of Nagoya, produces electric, acoustic and classical guitars, electric basses and ukuleles through its brands Laule'A, Mojo Gig Bags, Fiesta, José Antonio, Pignose, Kelii and Blitz.

== History ==
Aria was formed in Japan in 1956 by Shiro Arai as "Arai & Co., Inc".

They began retailing acoustic guitars in 1960, although the company did not start manufacturing their own until 1964. Aria arranged for Matsumoku, the musical instrument maker, to build the guitars for them under contract. Aria and Matsumoku started building acoustic guitars in 1964, and then electric guitars in 1966, using Arai, Aria, Aria Diamond, Diamond, and much less frequently, Arita brand names. The Aria brandname was changed to Aria Pro II in late 1975, though this has been used mostly (but not exclusively) for electric guitars and basses.

Aria Pro II electric guitars were closely linked to other Matsumoku-built brands such as Westone and Electra during the late 1970s and 1980s, often sharing OEM hardware and tremolo systems across ostensibly competing lines. Matsumoku produced Aria Pro II instruments alongside Westone-branded models for St. Louis Music (SLM) and earlier Electra-branded guitars, as well as other brands, with certain proprietary and licensed locking tremolos—such as units derived from Kahler and later Floyd Rose-style designs—appearing in parallel on Aria Pro II, Electra-Westone, and Washburn instruments as part of shared development and manufacturing arrangements.

All guitars were made in Japan until February 1987 when Matsumoku closed its doors. Production moved fully to Samick in Korea, although Samick had begun producing Aria Pro II guitars for Matsumoku as early as February 1986.

In the mid-1990s a few models (including the Fender Stratocaster-inspired Fullerton series guitars and the Steve Bailey 6-string fretless signature bass) were made in the United States.

== Bibliography ==
- "About Aria" (in Japanese). Nagoya: Arai & Co., Inc.
- "About Aria UK". Guildford: Aria UK Limited. Archived from the original on 2015-07-25.
