= Heinrich Bodinus =

German zoologist (1814–1884)

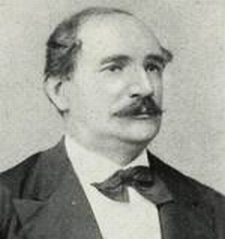
- Heinrich Bodinus
- Born: July 29, 1814
- Died: November 23, 1884 (aged 70)
- Occupation: Zoologist

Heinrich Bodinus (July 29, 1814 – November 23, 1884) was a German zoologist, best known for his role in the development of two of Germany's major zoos.

Bodinus was born in Drewelow, near Anklam, and from 1833 studied medicine, natural science, and especially zoology at the University of Greifswald and University of Berlin. Following his studies he established himself as a practicing physician in Bergen auf Rügen. He moved in 1852 to Greifswald, where he took up the study of zoology, and in 1859 he was hired to go to Cologne to open the Cologne Zoological Garden. This venture was successful enough that he was hired in 1869 to direct and reorganize the Berlin Zoological Garden.
