= Tippler =

Breed of pigeon

The tippler is a breed of domestic pigeon bred to participate in endurance competitions. Flying results of up to 22 hours (non-stop) have been reported.

== Origins ==
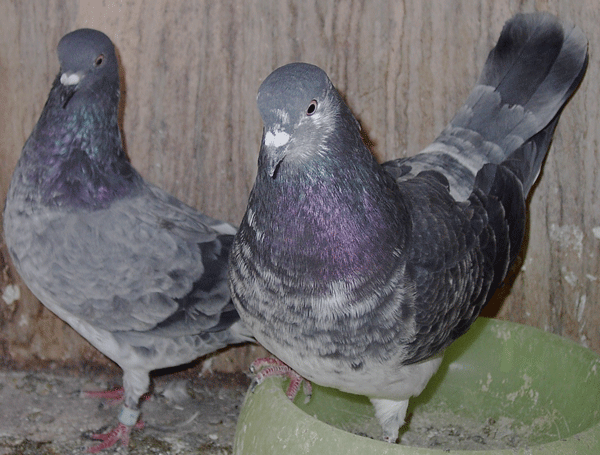
J. Bodens

The pigeon evolved from the rock pigeon (Columba livia) that is endemic to the region between the Mediterranean and China. Some pigeon breeds are believed to have originated from the Middle East, although the origin of the tippler is uncertain. The predominant theory is that the tippler was a cross breed, between the homing pigeon (Indian Highflyers/Tumblers) and the cumulet. This cross-breeding was thought to improve the bird's endurance and allow a larger flight range. It is proposed that selection for this long-term flying ability helped to eliminate its progenitor's tumbling flight behavior. The breed is believed to have originated in 1845, near the silk milling towns of Congleton and Macclesfield in East Cheshire, England. The breeder's aim was to perfect the "butterfly action" of the wings. The ease and grace of the wings enabled the tippler to attain its long flight duration. Levi, in The Pigeon, cites a reference from Hepworth (1893) who interviewed W. Jolly of Mill Green, who claimed that he had been breeding tipplers for fifty-six years. That would take the origin back to at least 1837. Levi also commented that the breed was developed around the towns of Rainow and Macclesfield. It further mentions, "Macclesfield tipplers", as a strain or type of tippler and that they were named after the region in which they were developed.

== Types ==
Tippler "types" were named after their breeders or their original location. Most of these types can stay aloft for over 19 hours.

"Hughes" were bred by Gordon Hughes in Derby, with a flying record of 18:07 in 1976.

"Sam Billingham", Arthur Newton, Joe Davies, and Jack Holland were also among England's top breeders.

Other popular types include "Lovatt", "Merredith", Shannon (also known as Irish Delight) and Sheffield (usually colored red and yellow).

Wilf Lovatt, 20:00, 1963

== Training ==
Tipplers are intelligent birds and can be trained to fly long hours and drop only when asked.

Eric Anslow, 21:21 in 1994

== Competitions and flying rules ==
The homing pigeon flies to race home, the Roller pigeon flies to roll, but the tippler just flies. Tippler fanciers can compete anywhere in the world without traveling. A "kit" of tipplers consists of three or more birds. Each tippler club has defined flying rules. Generally, the aim is for the whole kit to fly as long as possible. When one lands, or if the fancier gives the landing sign, the competition ends. Usually, the birds must be seen every hour by the referee to make sure that they are indeed flying. Most clubs base their flying rules on the "NTU flying rules".

Gordon Hughes in his loft.

The two categories of competition are young birds and old birds. A young bird is one hatched during the current year that bears a seamless band issued for that year. Any other bird is regarded as an old bird, regardless of its actual age. The first old bird race is usually about the middle of April, with others at two week intervals. The most important competition occupies the so-called Long Day. The longest (weekend) day of the year.

In Pakistan many fanciers and associations organize endurance competitions. In the Rawalpindi-Islamabad area, the All Pakistan Pigeons Lovers Association organizes two competitions one in September or October and one in May. Each fancier comes with a team of seven to eleven birds. In May, the competition starts at 4:50 am when the temperature gets up to 45 degrees. The total time scored by each team is calculated at the end and prizes are awarded. These competitions are not only a source of amusement but also an opportunity for social interaction.

== International records ==
- The following information was compiled in 2007.

Top 7 Old Birds
Record (h)	Fancier	Place	Year
22:05	H. Shannon	Northern Ireland, Lisburn	1995
21:21	E. Anslow	England, Tipton	1994
21:20	H. Shanon	Northern Ireland, Lisburn	2019
21:17	H. Shanon	Northern Ireland, Lisburn	2019
21:15	H. Shanon	Northern Ireland, Lisburn	2018
21:11	H. Shannon	Ireland, Lisburn	1995
21:10	H. Coulter	Ireland, Ulster	1992
21:00	J Lamb	Ireland, Crumlin	2001

Top 6 Young Birds
Record (h)	Fancier	Place	Year
19:44	J. Fee	Northern Ireland, Belfast || 2023	
19:40	H. Shannon	Ireland, Lisburn	1993
19:34	Plester	England, Birmingham	1990
19:19	Shannon	Ireland, Lisburn	1990
19:16	Shannon	Ireland, Lisburn	1994
19:16	Brown	England, Gladless	1986

== Clubs ==
- National Tippler Union of Great Britain NTU
- Chattogram Highflyer Pigeons Association - Bangladesh
- National Pigeon Fliers' Association -INDIA
- American Tippler Union ATU
- Southern Chapter American Tippler Union -SCATU
- Bulgaria Tippler Club NTKBG
- Dutch Tippler Club NVC
- Flying Tippler Club of North America FTCNA
- The Flying Tippler Association of America FTA
- Canadian Tippler Union CNTU
- Russian Tippler Club RTC
- German Tippler Union DFU
- German Tippler Club TCD
- Croatia Tippler Union HTS
- Czech Tippler Club KCHT
- Nepal Pigeons Keeper Association NPKA
- Australian Flying Tippler Union (AFTU)
- National Tippler Union Of TURKEY / (NTU-TR)
- National Tippler Union Of TURKEY / Bursa (BTK-TR)
- National Tippler Union Of TURKEY / Istanbul (İTK-TR)
- All Pakistan Pigeon Lovers Association / Islamabad

== See also ==
- Homing pigeon
- American Pigeon Journal May 1956
- List of pigeon breeds
