= Cumulet =

Breed of pigeon

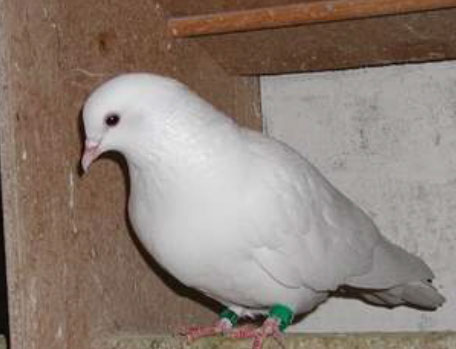
Cumulet

The Cumulet is a breed of fancy pigeon. It is a strong, high-flying breed, reportedly capable of remaining on the wing for up to 14 hours. The breed originated in France, and came to Britain in the 1870's. It was used for short-distance racing in England in the first half of the 1800s. Cumulet, along with other varieties of domesticated pigeons, are all descendants from the rock pigeon (Columba livia).

== History ==
- The Cumulet's name was taken from cumulus clouds, as a result of both the breed's coloring and their ability to fly up to 3,500 feet, where cumulus clouds form. When racing pigeons started to fly distances, high flyers such as the Cumulet became a less popular breed among fanciers.
- Cumulet pigeons were interbred with other breeds to create the Sheffield Tippler and Flying Tippler.

== Appearance ==
- The Cumulet is white with occasional red flecks on the hackle feathers of the neck. The beak is fairly straight and pale. The eyes are a pale pearl.

== See also ==
- List of pigeon breeds
