= Budapest Highflyer =

Breed of pigeon

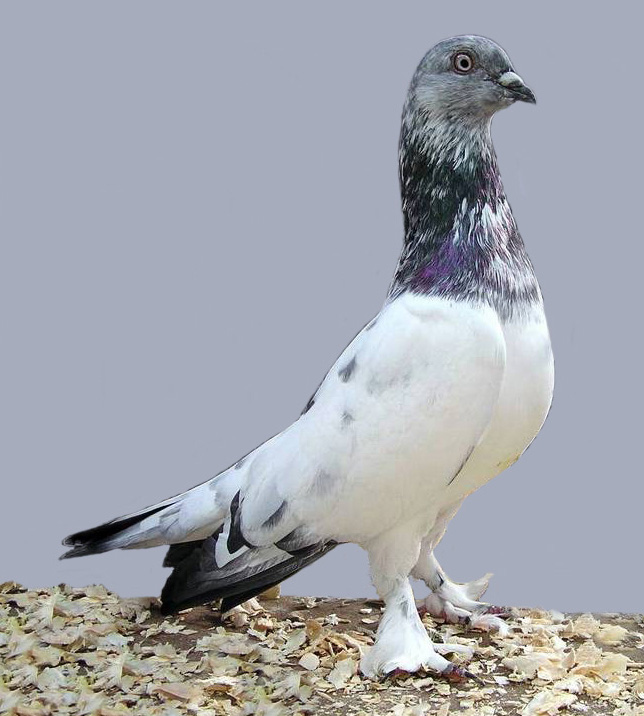
- Blue Grizzle Budapest Highflyer
- Conservation status: Common
- Other names: Budapest Coloured (EE)
- Country of origin: Hungary

Classification
- US Breed Group: Fancy
- EE Breed Group: Tumbler and Highflyer

The Budapest Highflyer (also known as Poltli and Budapest Coloured) is a breed of fancy pigeon developed over many years of selective breeding. Budapest Highflyers, along with other varieties of domesticated pigeons, are all descendants from the rock pigeon (Columba livia). The breed is the most popular in its native Hungary.

== See also ==
- List of pigeon breeds
