= Nis Highflyer =

Breed of pigeon

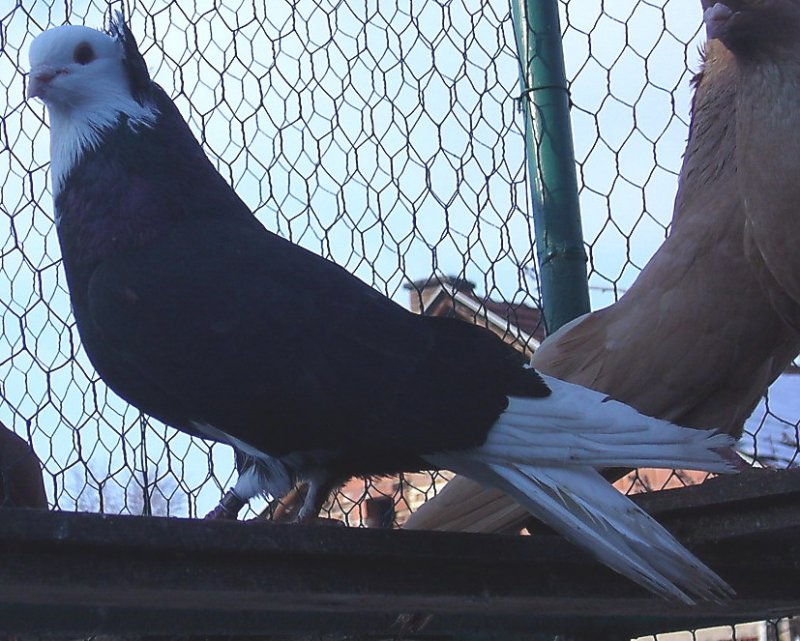
- Nis Highflyer
- Conservation status: Common
- Other names: Nisch Highflyer; Niški Visokoletac

Classification
- EE Breed Group: tumblers and highfliers

The Nis Highflyer (Serbian: Niški Visokoletac) is a breed of fancy pigeon developed over many years of selective breeding. Nis Highfliers along with other varieties of domesticated pigeons are all descendants from the rock pigeon (Columba livia).

== See also ==
- Pigeon keeping
- List of pigeon breeds
