= Vienna Highflyer =

Breed of pigeon

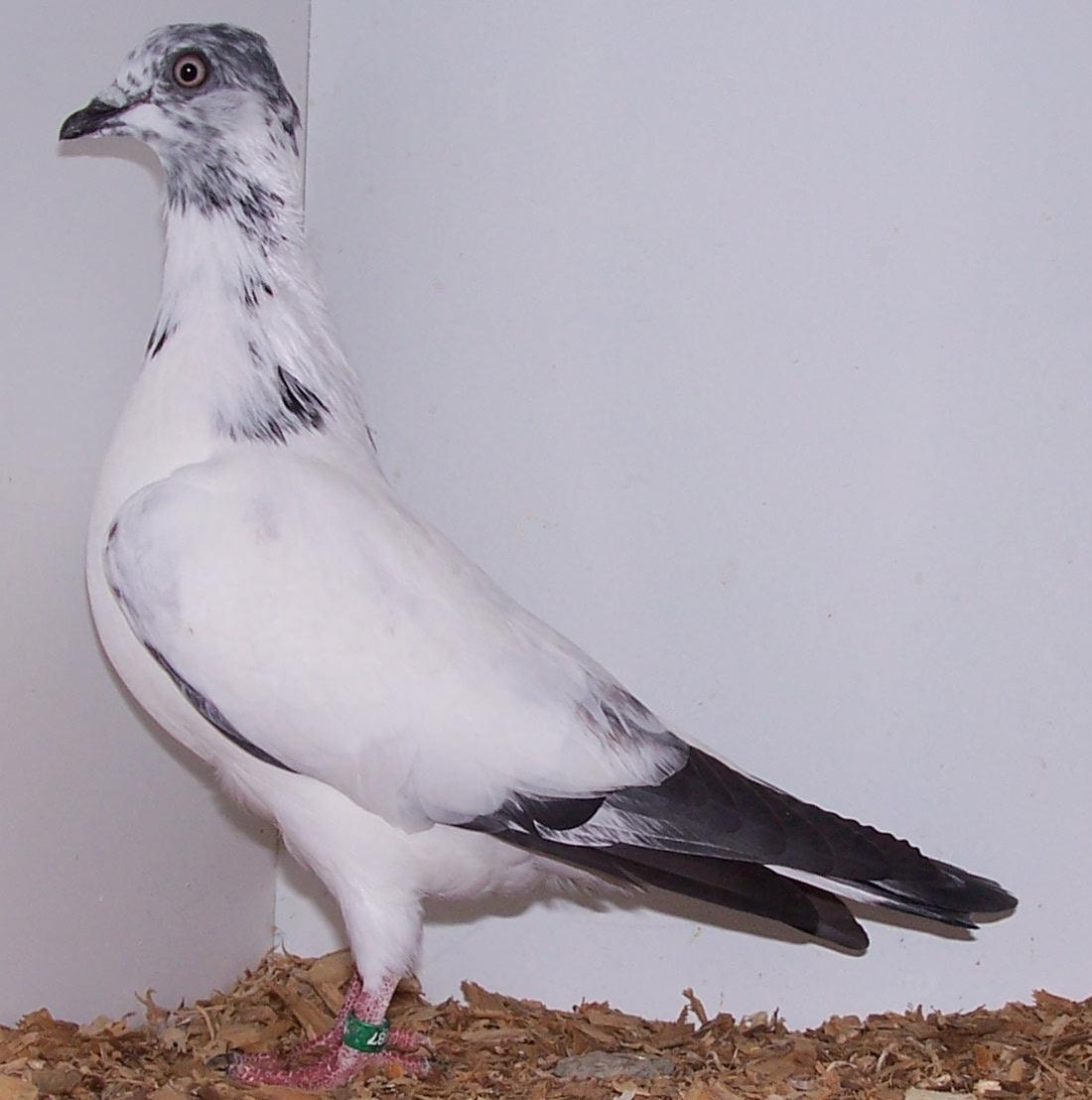
Vienna Highflyer

The Vienna Highflyer is a breed of fancy pigeon developed over many years of selective breeding. Vienna Highflyers, along with other varieties of domesticated pigeons, are all descendants from the rock pigeon (Columba livia).

== See also ==
- List of pigeon breeds
