= Matsumoku =

Japanese manufacturing company

Matsumoku Industrial
- Type: Private
- Founded: 1951
- Founder: Tsukada Satomi
- Defunct: 1987; 39 years ago
- Headquarters: Matsumoto, Nagano, Japan
- Products: Electric guitars, basses

Matsumoku Industrial was a Japanese manufacturing company based in Matsumoto, Nagano Prefecture, between 1951 and 1987. Established in 1951 as a woodworking and cabinetry firm, Matsumoku is remembered as a manufacturer of guitars and bass guitars, primarily Aria, Aria Pro II, Westone, Westbury, Univox, Vantage, some Epiphone guitars, and over 100 other contract badge names.

== Beginnings ==
In 1951, Matsumoku was founded as Matsumoto Mokkō (Matsumoto Woodworking) by Tsukada Satomi in Matsumoto, Nagano Prefecture, Japan. It was originally a woodworking business that specialized in building cabinets for Singer who contracted Matsumoto Mokkō to build sewing machine cabinets in a joint venture with Nippon Steel.

== Early Production Years, the 1960s ==
In 1960 a new 1.4 ha factory was constructed in Matsumoto City on a 4 ha site. In 1963, production of guitar bodies and necks began as OEM for the Fujigen company. This continued until 1967 when reciprocal parts exchange and joint manufacturing of some badge names began between Arai Trading (Aria) with Fujigen who had built a new factory in 1966 1 km from Matsumoto. Early Aria badged guitars are confirmed as of 1965 with Univox production as of 1966. In 1969 a new addition was built to the factory and the first confirmed Les Paul Custom copies were produced, ushering in the start of the so-called 'Copy Era' in Japanese guitar manufacturing.

== Middle Production Years, the 1970s ==
In 1970 the factory officially began production of Epiphone guitars and in 1971 the name change to Matsumoku Kogyo Co. Ltd. was made, with Kogyo translating as Industrial. The first half of the 1970s was dominated by copy model production of mainly Gibson and Fender models, but also some Rickenbacker and Mosrite copies for a couple years. The number of contract badge names accelerated and then declined by the mid 1970s.

In 1975 the dominant brand name made by Matsumoku was Aria which underwent a name change and new marketing direction in 1976, newly branded as Aria Pro II. In 1977 the flagship electric guitar model of the new Aria Pro II line was introduced as the PE-1500, which was a joint venture Matsumoku assisted design. This was followed by the SB-1000 bass in 1978.

In 1975 Matsumoku acquired the Westone name and initially developed acoustic guitars followed by electrics using this name as an as in-house brand. Many contract badge names from the late 60s and the early 70s have left the market by the mid 1970s. By 1978 Univox production ended, Westbury had begun a couple years earlier in 1976, Vantage production began in 1979, and the first uncatalogued Westone electrics appear in 1979. The dominant brand in the late 1970s is Aria Pro II with dozens of models in production and a clear transition away from copy models being replaced by unique design models. Peak monthly production as of 1977 was approximately 10,000 guitars.

== Final Production Years, the 1980s ==
The early 1980s saw growth of the Westone name with formal availability on the retail market in 1981. Monthly guitar production nonetheless had dropped to about 6,000 by 1981. Westbury badged guitar production ended in 1982. The American distributor, St. Louis Music, engaged with Matsumoku for a short lived design collaboration with models available in 1984 badged Electra Westone (Electra being a name already owned by SLM). As of the mid 1980s the strengthening yen was impacting business and export numbers were dropping. Some factory land was sold to Matsumoto City in 1984. Production numbers trailed off to 32,000 in 1985 (less than half of 1981 numbers) and through 1986 a final push to stay in business with new equipment added and accelerated order fulfillment was not enough to hold off dissolution by the start of 1987. The Matsumoku factory property was sold to Matsumoto City and later developed into a public park, named Nanbu Park, which exists to present times. In 1991 a monument was built in the park to honor the legacy of the company and its employees.

== Aria ==
The story of Matsumoku is highly aligned with the story of Aria guitars and parent company Arai Trading (or Arai and Company). No other badge name had as many models made at Matsumoku, and no other badge had as long of a business relationship with Matsumoku.

Shiro Arai founded Arai Trading in 1956 as an importer of classical guitars, sheet music, and strings. By 1960, Arai possibly had guitars made for export by Tokyo Sound and was importing Fender guitars and amplifiers, but details are vague for these early years. In 1963 Arai Trading established a relationship with Matsumoto Mokkō and instrument production followed soon thereafter. Originally badged Aria, a simple anagram of the name Arai, a copyright conflict with the Kawai company led to some use of the alternate names Aria Diamond and Diamonds (with an s), just Diamond, Arai Diamond, and just Arai, in the span of 1966 to 1970. The most significant early models in the 1960s were the 1532 solid body and 1202 hollowbody, including variations thereof. These models were designed by Matsumoto Mokkō's chief designer Nobuaki Hayashi (aka H. Noble).

Nobuaki Hayashi is best known as the Matsumoku designer in 1976 of the Aria Pro II SB-1000 bass and Aria Pro II PE-1500 and 1000 guitar models. He left Matsumoku soon after the 1977 launch of these guitars. Subsequent and ongoing design collaboration with Matsumoku staff transitioned Aria into many additional original designs and away from copy models. Gibson copies last officially appeared in catalogs in 1981.

The peak of Aria Pro II model design collaboration with Matsumoku was arguably the high end PE Supra model in 1985 which appears to have been the most expensive retail model made by the factory. The last Aria Pro II guitar made in the final month in business of the Matsumoku factory was the Laser Electric Classic, based on February 1987 serial numbers.

== Distinguishing characteristics ==
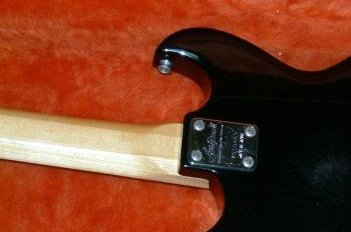
Back of an Aria Pro II CSB-400 showing 3 piece maple neck

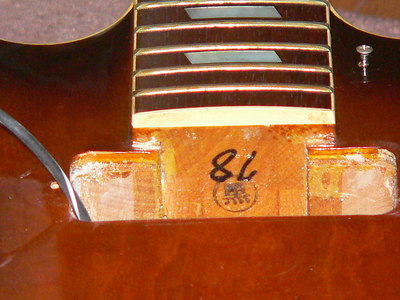
1983 Epiphone Casino, Hon (name stamp) "Kuro" - likely the name of the inspector. "78" is a production number and not a year.

Many Matsumoku built guitars from the 1960s to closing utilized a 3-piece maple neck with the center section's grain-oriented 90 degrees from the side wood. This created a very strong neck not prone to splitting or warping. An often used variation of this is the 5-piece neck with two thin veneer strips separating the 3 sections. Matsumoku made many neck-through-body solid-body electric guitars and basses from the end of the 1970s into the 1980s, most with 5-piece necks.

Matsumoku utilized several subcontractors including hardware, wiring, and pickup manufacturers. The Nisshin Onpa company (who own the Maxon Effects brand) is likely the best known subcontractor for pickups, with identifying ink stamp date codes and possible engraving of Maxon and/or PAT. PEND. on the underside of the base.

The name MATSUMOKU (uppercase) appeared on the neckplate of some guitars built from the mid 1970s to 1981. Most neckplates otherwise have uppercase text of STEEL REINFORCED NECK (1965-1971) or STEEL ADJUSTABLE NECK (late 1960s to mid 1970s), also with MADE IN JAPAN and serial numbers of 6 or 7 digits. From 1981 to closing, neckplates typically have the logo specific name of the respective Matsumoku client, plus a 7 digit serial number. Most set neck guitars from the end of 1975 to 1981 have a 6 digit serial on the back of the headstock, and from 1981 to closing, a 7 digit number.

== Notable players of Matsumoku guitars ==
- Earl Hooker, Univox Rhythm and Blues bolt-on Les Paul copy.
- Kurt Cobain of Nirvana, Univox Hi-Flier, Epiphone ET-270, Aria Pro II Cardinal Series CS-250, Washburn Force 31
- John Taylor of Duran Duran, Aria Pro II SB-700, Aria Pro II SB-900, Aria Pro II SB-1000 bass
- Cliff Burton of Metallica, Aria Pro II Elite, Aria Pro II Black'n'Gold bass
- Elvin Bishop, Electra Model 2281
- Neal Schon, Aria Pro II PE series guitars (several models)
- Noel Gallagher and Paul "Bonehead" Arthurs of Oasis played Matsumoku-manufactured Epiphone Rivieras in mid-1990s
- Dave Brock of Hawkwind plays a Matsumoku made Westone Spectrum LX among other Westone guitars
- Wayne Hussey of The Mission plays a (very rare) Matsumoku Aria Pro II RS-800/12
- Tim Smith of Cardiacs, Westone Thunder I
- James Iha of The Smashing Pumpkins and A Perfect Circle, Epiphone ET-270
- Robert Smith of The Cure, Epiphone 5102T / EA-250
- Georgia South of Nova Twins, Westone Thunder I bass

== Key References ==
- Ito, Masashi (aka Director TAD), the Junk Guitar Museum. 2018. Matsumoku Industries Co., Ltd.
- Shinko Music Pub. Co. Ltd. (Tokyo). 2004. Japan Vintage Vol. 5. Sound of Aria. Part 1 The History of Aria Pro II.
- Meyers, Frank. 2015. History of Japanese Electric Guitars. Anaheim Hills CA USA: Centerstream Publishing LLC.

citations
