= Jackson King V =

Electric guitar model

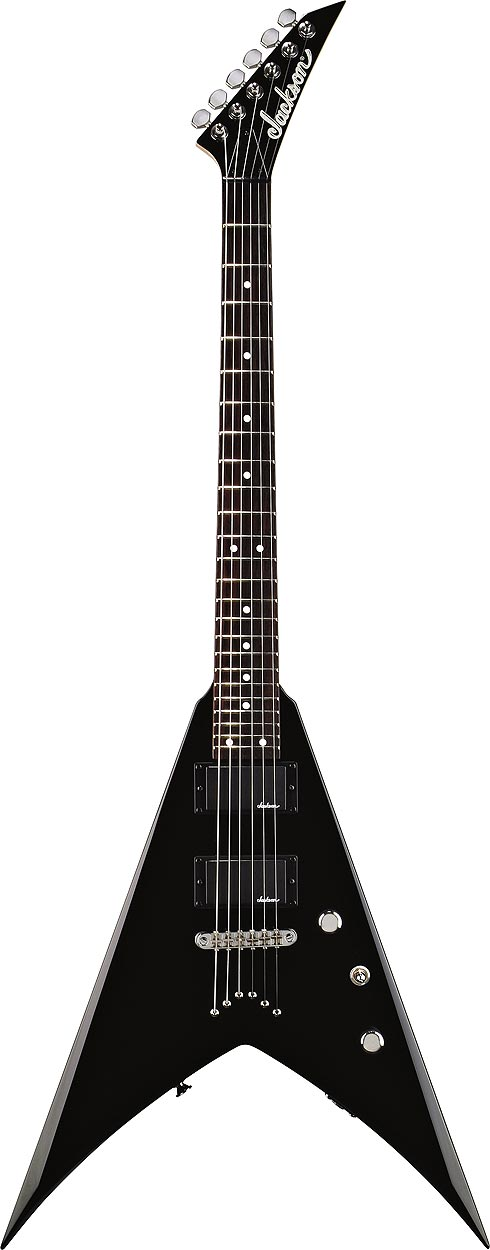
- JS30KV, an entry level model in production since the 2000s
- Manufacturer: Jackson Guitars
- Period: 1980s–present

Construction
- Body type: Solid
- Neck joint: Neck-thru/bolt on

Woods
- Body: Basswood
- Neck: Maple
- Fretboard: Rosewood / Ebony, 22 or 24 frets

Hardware
- Bridge: Fixed / double Locking tremolo
- Pickup(s): H-H

Colors available
- White, Black, Green, Silver, Orange sunburst and red

The King V is an electric guitar model made by Jackson Guitars.

== Origin and history ==
The Jackson King V was originally named after Robbin Crosby of Ratt, his nickname being "King". Crosby popularized the guitar throughout the 1980s, however the guitar he played most often was his Double Rhoads guitar, a modified design of the Jackson Rhoads guitar. King V model surfaced as a downsized version of the Double Rhoads, which was designed and targeted for a shorter, more ordinary person. (Crosby was 6.5 feet/198 cm tall, hence the nickname "King").

Megadeth frontman Dave Mustaine eventually became the guitarist most identified with using this model. After creating a custom King V for Mustaine (completed October 10, 1986), the company later began mass-producing a Dave Mustaine Signature Series King V, which featured 24 frets (as opposed to the typical 22 frets) and would become one of their best selling guitars. This line continued into the early 2000s, when it underwent massive changes and became the Y2KV, a guitar based much more heavily on the Gibson Flying V. Mustaine then sold his entire personal collection of Jacksons, and subsequently signed endorsement deals with ESP Guitars in 2003, Dean Guitars in 2007, and Gibson Family Brands in 2021 (Gibson, Epiphone, Kramer).

== Variants of the King V ==
Listed below is the range of King V models in chronological order.

=== San Dimas/Ontario custom-shop era (1980s–1990s) ===
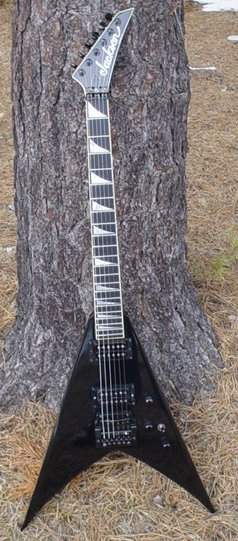
The first King V Custom in black with Kahler tremolo ever built. It is serial number J0506. It was completed 3/10/85 and predates Dave Mustaine's first King V by 17 months.

Double Rhoads
The Double Rhoads was a symmetrical version of the Jackson Rhoads with two longer horns, the first one was ordered from Overkill guitarist Dave Linsk. While the guitar was made, Ratt guitarist Robbin Crosby saw it and wanted a similar guitar. Jackson built him two, one red and one black (he later got his white DR). Circa 10 Double Rhoads' were built and never in mass production before the design was changed with smaller wings and became the King V, the first King V was silver with black bevels.

King V Custom
From start to 1985 this was the name for a King V with sharkfin inlays, neck binding and ebony fretboard. Pickup and bridge options were anything the purchaser wanted.

King V Student
Same as above, but with dot inlays, no binding, and rosewood fretboard.

=== Ontario mass production era (1990s) ===
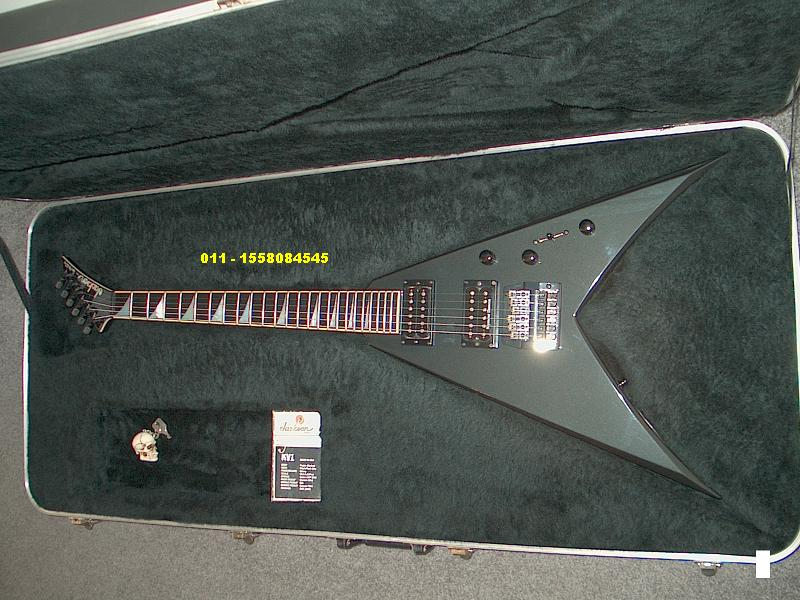
A KV1, same model played by Dave Mustaine before the Y2KV was created.

KV1(Artist Signature Series)
The KV1 is a Dave Mustaine signature model and is the first commercially-sold model of the King V. Previously known as the King V Pro, the KV1 supersedes the King V Pro and eliminated the Cherryburst finish in favor of a natural Korina wood finish. The tuners were replaced with LSR locking tuners as well. The end-points were shortened from the prototype created for Robbin Crosby as it was created as a "Double-Rhoads" which has a longer point than this model (The "Double-Rhoads" has 2 equal length long points). All other variants below stemmed from this design including 24 frets. USA-made versions of this guitar are highly coveted by metal guitarists and are typically difficult to locate ones for sale. No longer in production.

Y2KV (Artist Signature Series)
The Y2KV is a Dave Mustaine signature model and differs from all other King Vs in that it has rounded ends which seem similar to that of the Gibson Flying V. No longer in production.

KV2 (USA Series)
The KV2 is a variant of the King V which comes under the 'USA Select Series' of Jackson Guitars. The body is made of alder and is intersected by a neck-thru quartersawn maple neck with ebony fingerboard. It has Neck and Bridge humbucking pickups, both from Seymour Duncan, which are both the JB model. This model has 24 frets and a 2-point double locking Floyd Rose tremolo and is constructed in the US. The KV2 is one of the 4 USA Select Series guitars (alongside the KE2, RR1, and WR1) built with the "Jackson Speed Neck" profile, a slim neck thickness for a fast playability.

KV2T (USA Series)
The KV2T is a variant of the King V which comes under the 'USA Select Series' of Jackson Guitars. The body is made of mahogany and is intersected by a three piece neck-thru quartersawn mahogany neck with ebony fingerboard. Later made the alder body and quartersawn maple neck, with ebony fingerboard, too. It has neck and bridge humbucking pickups, both from Seymour Duncan, with a JB in the bridge and a '59 in the neck. This model has 24 frets but what is unique to this particular model is that it has a string through body, 'shark eye' fretboard inlay, an abalone Jackson logo on the headstock, the headstock itself is an SLS type rather than the traditional concorde Jackson headstock and has Sperzel locking tuners. Also to note is that the body is a flat top and lacks the bevels of the other Jackson King Vs. The guitar is also a 24 3/4" scale rather than the 25.5" scale that other Jackson King Vs have, though it was originally produced in a 25.5" scale.

KV3 (Pro Series)
The KV3 was produced in 1996-2001 in Japan. Features Duncan Designed pickups, Jackson JT580LP Tremolo, 22 frets, 1x volume, 1x tone, 1x 3way toggle, sharktooth inlays, bolt on maple neck, poplar body. Mother of pearl inlaid rosewood fret board. The jack output was situated upon the upper wing, just like in more expensive series. No longer in production.

KV4
Since 1999 (Korean Series) / 2001 (USA Series), features Seymour Duncan JB Model SH-4 and TB-4 pickups, Floyd Rose Licensed Jackson JT580LP Tremolo, 24 frets, 1x volume, 1x tone, 1x 3way toggle, pearloid sharkfin inlays, maple neck-thru alder body w/ rosewood fretboard. No longer in production.

KV5
This is a Japanese made 'mid range' variant for the King V. The body is made of Alder and is intersected by a neck-thru quartersawn maple neck with rosewood fingerboard. It has Neck and Bridge humbucking pickups, both from Seymour Duncan. This model has 24 frets and a 2-point double locking Floyd Rose tremolo. No longer in production.

=== FMIC Jackson brand era (2000s–) ===
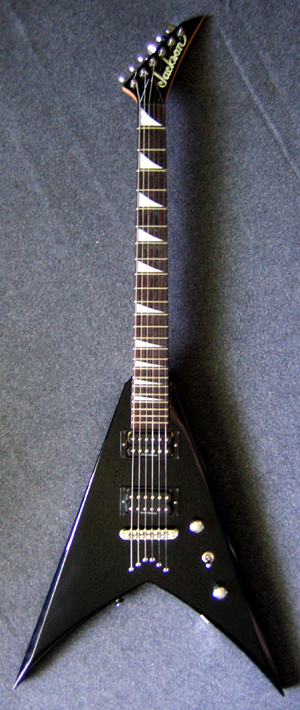
Jackson KVX10 Model (Made in Japan, string-through-body variant)

KVX10 (X series)
Early models were poplar w/ a bolt on maple neck, rosewood fretboard, and an adjustable bridge string-through-body design; post 2006 models are poplar. the pickups are Duncan Designed HB-103B in the bridge position and an HB-102N in the neck position. The standard model has 24 frets w/ sharkfin inlays and a Floyd Rose Licensed Jackson low profile tremolo. This model's first year was 2001 and was built in India for that year only. Subsequent models are all built in Japan.

Indian bolt-on Jackson has a NHJ serial (I(N)DIA, (H)ARMONY, (J)ACKSON, as Indonesia already took the I coded serial), while the MIJ continued to use their sequential serial starting with 96, 97 or 98. The KVX10 use a jack mount plate on the bottom wing next to the cavity.

JS30KV (JS Series)
The JS30KV is a variant of the King V which comes under the 'JS series'; the entry-level series of Jackson Guitars. The body is made of Indian Cedro, connected to the maple neck, which is bolt-on. The fingerboard is made from Rosewood. The guitar has 24 frets and Jackson humbucking pickups. The bridge is an adjustable string-through-body, Jackson JT390 specification. This model is built in Indonesia.
A next generation version of the JS30KV are the JS32T King V (same as JS30, but sharkfin inlays) and the JS32R King V (same as JS32, but with Floyd Rose Licensed Jackson Low Profile JT580 LP Double Locking 2-Point Tremolo).

Jenna Jameson Model (Custom Shop Limited Run)
The Jenna Jameson model is an altered KVX10. The model is limited edition and features a Jenna Jameson graphic on the body, her signature below one of the humbuckers and a copy of her 'Heart-breaker' tattoo inlaid at the 12th fret. This model features an adjustable string-through-body bridge and slightly superior humbuckers like the older KVX10 model (pre-2006). No longer in production.

25th Anniversary Model (Custom Shop Limited Run)
The 25th Anniversary Model was announced to coincide with Jackson Guitars' 25th Anniversary, 2006. Two guitars were released, one a limited edition Kelly, the other a limited edition King V, up-sized to Double Rhoads dimensions. The King V comes in Mercedes Silver only and is hand-signed by Mike Shannon, Senior Master Builder at the Jackson Custom Shop. The body is made from Poplar and is intersected by a quartersawn maple neck-thru three-piece neck. The fingerboard is made from ebony and has 22 frets. The guitar has neck and bridge humbucking pickups, both made by Seymour Duncan. The bridge is an original Floyd Rose 2 point double locking tremolo. This guitar was built in the Jackson custom shop and only 25 units were made.

Demmelition King V (Artist Signature Series)
The first signature model since the Y2KV, the Demmelition King V is the signature model of guitarist Phil Demmel of Machine Head. Demmelition King Vs however are not built like traditional King Vs, as they have two cutaways in each wing on the guitar (used to only be available as custom shop option only). The guitar has an alder body, a maple neck, a 24 fret ebony fretboard with mother of pearl sharkfin inlays, an original Floyd Rose tremolo, EMG 81 active pickup at the bridge and an EMG 60 active pickup at the neck. The Demmelition King V is also factory tuned to Drop B tuning, the same tuning Demmel uses on most Machine Head songs (some are in C# Standard, such as Aesthetics of Hate). It is available in five color schemes (black with silver bevels, white with black bevels, red with black bevels, gold with black bevels and black with white polka dots).

King V KVXMG (X Series)
KVXMG has a basswood body, neck through-body construction, maple neck and active EMG 85 and 81 humbucking pickups. Other features include Floyd Rose Special double-locking two-point tremolo, 24 jumbo frets, and three-way blade pickup switching. Available in Black, Kawasabi Green and Snow White.

Corey Beaulieu USA Signature KV6 (Artist Signature Series)
This is a signature model for Trivium's lead guitarist Corey Beaulieu. It has 6 and 7 string models. It has alder body with flame maple top body, quartersawn maple neck with neck-thru-body neck joint, 24-fretted ebony fretboard with pearloid sharkfin inlays, Seymour Duncan AHB-1B (bridge) and AHB-1N (neck) pickups and Original Floyd Rose tremolo system and it comes in Transparent Red Burst, Transparent Black Burst and Gloss Black colors. The new version has a mahogany body with quilt maple top and comes in Winterstorm color.
