= Turn of the century =

English-language phrase

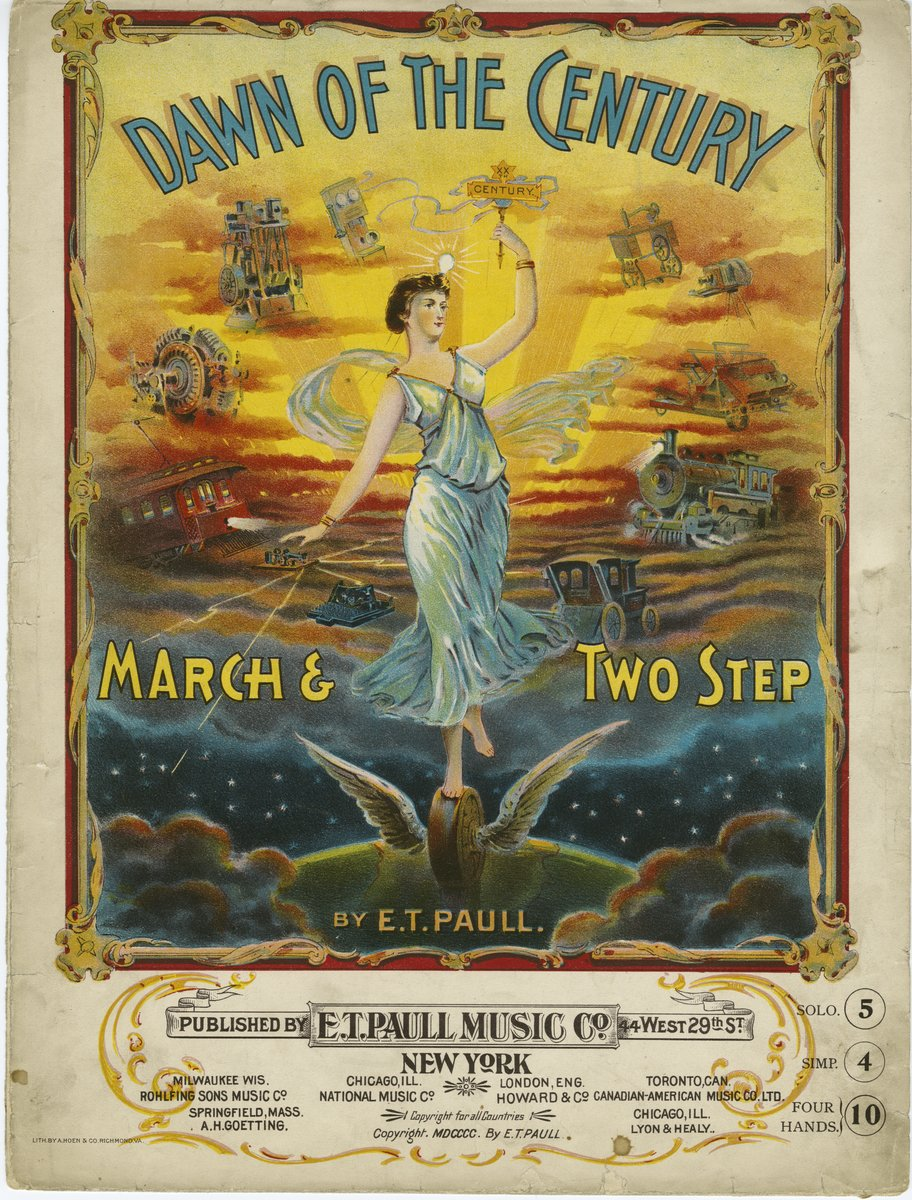
1900 sheet music cover reflecting the era's optimism about a better future through technological progress

The turn of the century is the transition from one century to another, or the time period before or after that change in centuries.

== Usage ==
The phrase "turn of the century" is generally understood to mean the change in time (whether upcoming or past) closest to the current generation. During the 20th century, the phrase, unqualified, was used to refer to the transition from the 19th century to the 20th century. In the 21st century, "turn of the 21st century" (or 20th century) may be used to avoid ambiguity.

The Chicago Manual of Style has indicated some ambiguity on the exact meaning of the phrase "turn of the n-th century". For instance, if a statement describes an event as taking place "at the turn of the 18th century", it could refer to a period around the year 1701 or around 1800, that is, the beginning or end of that century. Consequently they recommend only using "turn of the century", in a context that makes clear which transition is meant, otherwise using different, unambiguous, wording.

== See also ==
- Fin de siècle
- Progressive Era
- Edwardian era
- Information Age
- Y2K
- The Turn of the Century
