= Dan Erlewine =

American luthier

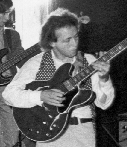
- Erlewine in 1966
- Born: c. 1945 (age 80–81); Ann Arbor, Michigan, US
- Occupation: Luthier
- Years active: 1963-present
- Known for: Instructional videos
- Website: danerlewine.com

Dan Erlewine (born c. 1945) is an American luthier and the author of five books about guitar repair. He has made instructional videos about the luthier trade since 1983. He works for a luthier supply company, Stewart-Macdonald (StewMac).

== Early life ==
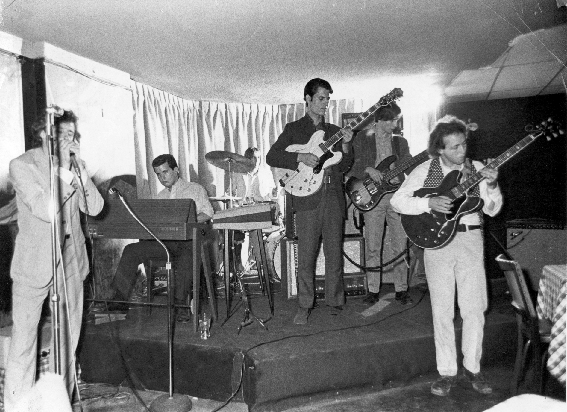
The Prime movers 1966 (Dan far right)

He was born c. 1945 and he grew up in Ann Arbor, Michigan. His mother was an artist, and his father's hobby was working with wood. In an interview with PBS he said, "In about 10th grade I went into a pawn shop in Detroit and bought a cheap guitar, one that had been painted with black and white stripes." In 1963 after he had been working on guitars as a hobby he began working at a music store: Herb David Guitar Studio. In the 1960s Erlewine also played in rock bands. In the 1960s he played lead guitar in a band called The Prime Movers. His brother Michael was also in the band. The band was prominent in Ann Arbor, Michigan but did not go on to headline in other areas of the country.

== Career ==
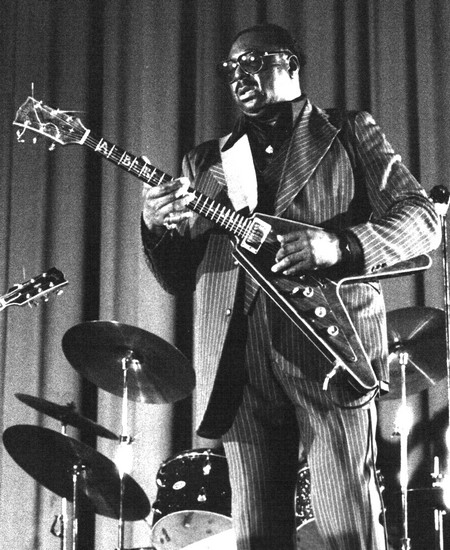
Albert King in 1978 with the second Lucy, made by Dan Erlewine. Note the inlay on the head ("Lucy") and his name on the neck (Albert King).

In 1969 Dan Erlewine and his brother opened their own music store in Ann Arbor which he named Erlewine Instruments. Dan's cousin Mark also became a luthier and he is known for working on Willie Nelson's famous guitar Trigger.

In 1983, Dan began filming himself working on guitar; creating instructional videos about the luthier trade. In 1984 he went to the National Association of Music Merchants (NAMM) convention, to demonstrate luthier work at the Dunlop Manufacturing booth. It was at NAMM that Erlewine was discovered by Stewart-Macdonald (StewMac) He was then hired by StewMac and began producing content on VHS, DVD, and YouTube videos. He delivers his instructional videos about the luthier trade with a calm demeanor.

He also began building custom electric guitars and he built guitars for blues guitarist Albert King. Erlewine saw Albert King playing an upside down Gibson Flying V named "Lucy" when he attended the Ann Arbor Blues and Jazz Festival in Michigan in 1970: in 1971 he met King at a show in Ann Arbor. Erlewine offered to build King a true left-handed Flying V out of a 125-year old piece of black walnut. King agreed and came to Erlewine's shop the next day, where Erlewine measured his guitar and took notes. King asked for his name to be inlaid on the fretboard, and the name "Lucy" on the peghead. This Lucy was delivered to King in May 1972. Since then Erlewine has made a number of copies, all from the same slab of walnut; Erlewine said in 2009 that he had enough wood to make 20 or so Lucys. The guitar he built for Albert King was named Lucy and it is in the style of a Gibson Flying V. Blues guitarist Joe Bonamassa played Albert King's guitar Lucy and liked it so much that he had Dan Erlewine build him a copy. Bonamassa's name is inlaid on the fingerboard.

He built for American guitarist Jerry Garcia of the rock band the Grateful Dead. The guitar was named the "Stratishcaster". The guitar is a Fender Stratocaster which has been customized with a Gibson style stop tailpiece, and a rosewood pickguard. The guitar also has numbers which are inlaid as fret markers in the fingerboard.

In 1975, he opened a new shop called Dan Erlewine's Guitar Hospital. The new shop was located in Big Rapids, Michigan. Vintage Guitar Magazine has said Dan Erlewine is a "world-class repair expert" and "Among the famous names in American guitar lore". Acoustic Guitar Magazine has said he "might be the most famous guitar repairperson on earth".

In 2021 he began a relationship with the Iris Guitar company to manufacture a version of an acoustic guitar which is similar to the 1937 Kalamazoo KG-11. The guitar features banjo-style guitar tuners, a long headstock and a built-in brass capo which screws into the guitar neck.

== Books ==
- Erlewine, Dan (2007). Guitar Player Repair Guide: How to Set Up, Maintain, and Repair Electrics and Acoustics. New York: Hal Leonard Corporation. ISBN 978-0-87930-921-3.
- Erlewine, Dan (2012). How to Make Your Electric Guitar Play Great!. South Plainfield, New Jersey: Backbeat Books. ISBN 978-0-87930-998-5.
- Erlewine, Dan; MacRostie, Don (2005). Guitar Finishing, Step-by-Step. Athens, Ohio: Stewart-MacDonald. ISBN 978-0-9776519-0-0.
- Erlewine, Dan (1994). Fret Work: Step-by-step. Athens, Ohio: Stewart-MacDonald's Guitar Shop Supply. ISBN 978-0-9644752-1-2.
- Erlewine, Dan (1994). Trade Secrets: Book one. Athens, Ohio: Stewart-MacDonald's Guitar Shop Supply.
