= Jackson Y2KV =

Guitar designed by Dave Mustaine

- Manufacturer: Jackson Guitars
- Period: 2000-2002
- Scale: 25.5

Woods
- Body: Mahogany
- Neck: Mahogany through-body

Hardware
- Bridge: Tune-o-Matic string through body
- Pickup(s): Seymour Duncan JB-TB4 bridge and JB SH-4 neck.

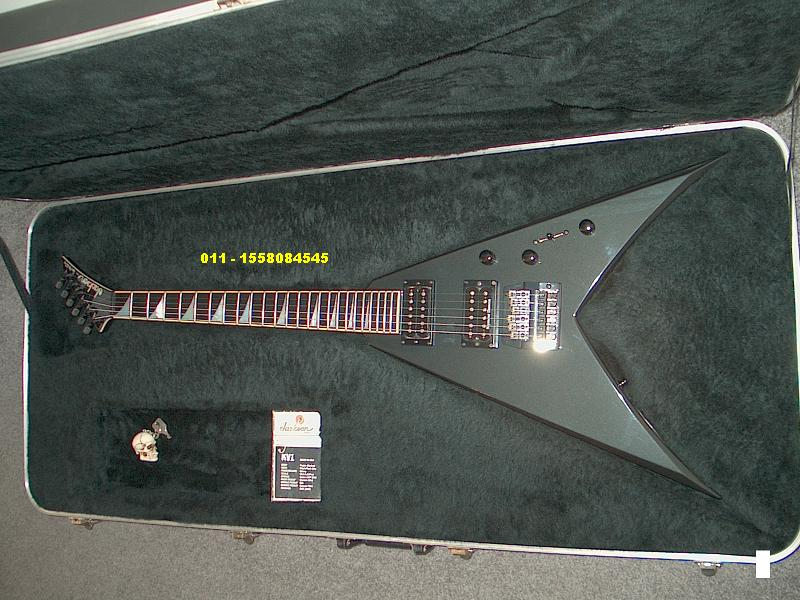
Jackson King V, KV1, the same model Dave Mustaine played before making his signature Y2KV. Owned by Brian Buchner.

Jackson Y2KV was a guitar designed by Dave Mustaine, in an effort to create a less aggressive and retro-looking flying V guitar, to contrast for his usual King V. It was mainly used for touring of Risk and The World Needs a Hero as Mustaine's own model, with less than a dozen produced, including some prototypes. Eventually, the Y2KV went mass production and introduced in the Jackson Guitars year 2000 catalog.

The DVD concert Rude Awakening features the Y2KV with a Floyd Rose bridge and a "Shut up" sticker in between the pickups. For the closure song "Holy Wars", Mustaine uses a Y2KV stars and stripes (USA flag).

== Features ==
The guitar resembles a classic Flying V shape, with rounded edges, and symmetrical and rounded headstock as well.

The "wings" of the Y2KV appear longer than a standard Flying V a-la the Gibson model, but this is merely an illusion. Upon holding a Y2KV side by side with a Gibson, it becomes apparent that the overall length of the Y2KV body is exactly the same as the Gibson model. The reason the "wings" look longer on the Y2KV is because the "crotch" of the Y2KV (where the two "wings" meet, directly behind the bridge) is several inches closer to the fretboard than on the Gibson model. As a result, the space between the bridge and the fretboard is compressed compared to the Gibson model, resulting in a very compact looking setup. Two more distinctions between the Y2KV and the Gibson Flying V are that the Y2KV is a neck-through (whereas the Gibson isn't) and the Y2KV doesn't have a tailpiece, instead being a "string-through". Combined, these two differences result in a guitar with well above average sustain compared to similar guitars.

Control
Volume, Volume, Tone, three-way toggle.
