= Lucy (Albert King guitar) =

Guitar owned by Albert King

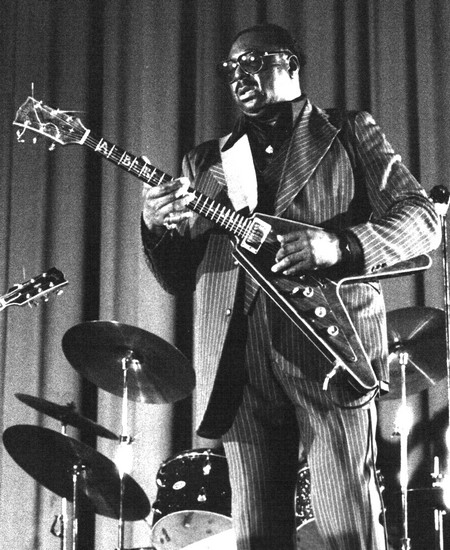
Albert King in 1978 with the second Lucy, made by Dan Erlewine. Note the inlay on the head ("Lucy") and on the neck ("Albert King").

Lucy is the name given to the Gibson Flying V and a series of copies owned by blues guitarist Albert King. King apparently picked the Flying V (at a time when few other guitarists did) because of its style, and in return helped make it famous.

== First Lucy ==
The "original" Lucy, named for Lucille Ball, was a right-handed 1959 Gibson Flying V made of korina, and it is the guitar King used on almost all of the important recordings he made for Stax Records. The guitar was stolen but later recovered. King bought it in his St. Louis days, in the late 1950s, when his career was beginning to take off. He kept the name secret for a while, for some reason, and then revealed it as Lucy; Stax played up the revelation by releasing the single "I Love Lucy", which became a hit in 1968.

King played a second Flying V, a 1966 model, after his 1959 model was stolen. Reportedly this one was given to him by Gibson; this is the guitar he used to record "Born Under a Bad Sign". The 1959 V was recovered and it was retired in 1974, to make way for the second Lucy.

== Second Lucy ==
The second Lucy was made by luthier Dan Erlewine, who had seen King when the latter played at the Ann Arbor Blues Festival in Michigan in 1970, and in 1971 had met King at a show in Ann Arbor. He offered to build him a true left-handed V out of a 125-year old piece of black walnut. King agreed and came to Erlewine's shop the day after, where Erlewine measured his guitar and took notes. King asked for his name to be inlaid on the fretboard, and the name "Lucy" on the peghead. This Lucy was delivered to King in May 1972. The guitar was refretted (by Erlewine's cousin Mark, in Texas) in the late 1970s or early 1980s, and underwent repairs in Memphis after being underwater for 24 hours due to a tornado in the mid 1980s. Erlewine saw the guitar again in 1989 and did fret work and other minor repairs. Since then Erlewine has made a number of copies, all from the same slab of walnut; Erlewine said in 2009 that he had enough wood to make 20 or so Lucys.

== Third Lucy ==
In 1980, a third Lucy was made by Bradley Prokopow. King played the Erlewine and Prokopow guitars until his death in 1992.

== Fourth Lucy ==
Built by John Bolin upon commission from Billy Gibbons, this one is known as the pink Lucy. Currently resides at Stax Museum in Memphis

== Fifth Lucy ==
Custom Archtop Flying V, built by Tom Holmes in 1987 upon commission from Billy Gibbons, it was given to AK for his 64th birthday. This guitar was sold by Julien's action on Nov 17 for over 63K to an unknown collector.

== Legacy ==
Steven Seagal owns the 1959 and 1966 Flying Vs, and the Erlewine copy. A rumor reported by Seagal has it that the 1959 V was a bargaining chip in a craps game in the late 1960s; Seagal says he bought it in Memphis after the guitar had been hidden for twenty years. He bought the Erlewine copy in the early 2000s. Seagal's repairman had the guitar in his shop when his seven-year-old son happened to see it, along with the ghost of a "big black man" he later identified as King. The Gibson website echoes Seagal's judgment on King's importance to the guitar, and says Lucy played "a considerable role in immortalizing the model".

== See also ==
- List of guitars
