= Jackson Rhoads =

Model of electric guitar

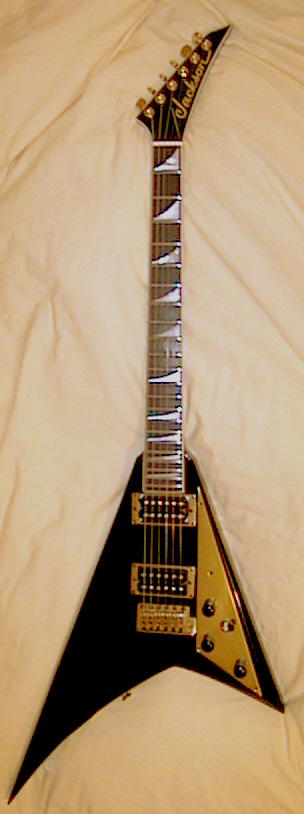
- Jackson Rhoads Concorde prototype with vintage tremolo
- Manufacturer: Jackson Guitars
- Period: 1981–present

Construction
- Body type: Solid
- Neck joint: Neck-through and bolt-on

Woods
- Body: Various, often alder
- Neck: Various, often maple
- Fretboard: Various, often ebony

Hardware
- Bridge: Fixed, Floyd Rose tremolo or tune-o-matic
- Pickup: 1 or 2 humbuckers

Colors available
- Various, including custom finish graphics

The Jackson Rhoads is a model of electric guitar, originally commissioned by guitarist Randy Rhoads and produced by Jackson Guitars.

== Origin ==
=== The Concorde ===
Randy Rhoads' first Jackson prototype was the white, pinstriped, asymmetrical Flying V-inspired model built by Grover Jackson, Tim Wilson, and Mike Shannon of Charvel Guitars.

The guitar featured a maple neck and body (neck through body), ebony fretboard, medium frets, Stratocaster style tremolo, and Seymour Duncan pickups. The prototype was the first from the Charvel works to be labeled with Jackson's name.

The guitar was originally slated to be called The Original SIN, but Randy nicknamed it Concorde after the sleek, white supersonic aircraft.

The meeting between Jackson and Rhoads that led to the creation of the Concorde was said to have taken place on December 23, 1980, and was based on a rough outline that Rhoads had written down on a cocktail napkin.

=== The second Rhoads prototype ===
Randy re-designed the next prototype because he felt the shape of the Concorde was not distinctive enough from the traditional Flying V. His solution was to elongate the top "horn" of the instrument such that the body bore more resemblance to a shark's fin.

The second prototype featured the revised body shape, was black with a gold pickguard, and fixed tailpiece with strings anchored in the body. This guitar featured Grover locking tuners and Seymour Duncan humbucking pickups (TB-4 bridge and a SH-2 neck).

=== Further prototypes ===
Two more string through body prototypes were commissioned (making four in total). One (later accidentally sold at the NAMM Show) was white with gold hardware and reversed shark fin inlays, and the other was black with brass hardware and reversed shark fin inlays; this fourth prototype is pictured in the photo. Rhoads died in a plane crash in March 1982, before these two guitars were completed and before he could give Grover any feedback. These revised prototypes would become the first guitars sold to the public under the Jackson Guitars brand name.

== Notable users ==
Vinnie Vincent, formerly of Kiss, was the first professional guitarist to be offered an early Rhoads guitar by Jackson after Rhoads' death, which Vincent used on the Kiss Creatures of the Night and Lick It Up tours from 1982 until 1984. Following Vincent's departure from Kiss, he modified the Rhoads V design by adding a second V at a slight rotation to the first such that it mimics a shadow. Jackson made at least 3 of these Vincent modified Rhoads Vs from 1985 to 1988 for Vincent, and about 25 others were custom ordered and sold. The design would later be copied by Carvin, Ibanez, Washburn Guitars, as well as to numerous boutique brands, all with Vinnie Vincent's cooperation.

In 2001, guitarists Alexi Laiho and Roope Latvala (of Children of Bodom and Sinergy) had their own custom Rhoads, which featured alder bodies, neck-through construction, 24 frets, ebony fretboard, white binding, and gold hardware including an original Floyd Rose tremolo bridge. The electronics were the Jackson J-50BC pickup with JE-1000 preamp. The model was called the Jackson Rhoads L/L (for Latvala/Laiho). There were several different finishes, notably Laiho's which was black with yellow bevels and gold hardware, and Latvala's main Rhoads was black with inverted cross inlays. Jackson released a limited number of the RR24 in the popular black finish with yellow highlights.

== Models ==
Basic shape of the Rhoads V

Jackson currently has 12 different Rhoads models in production. Previous models included the aluminum bodied 'Roswell Rhoads' with crop circle inlays.

=== USA Select Series ===
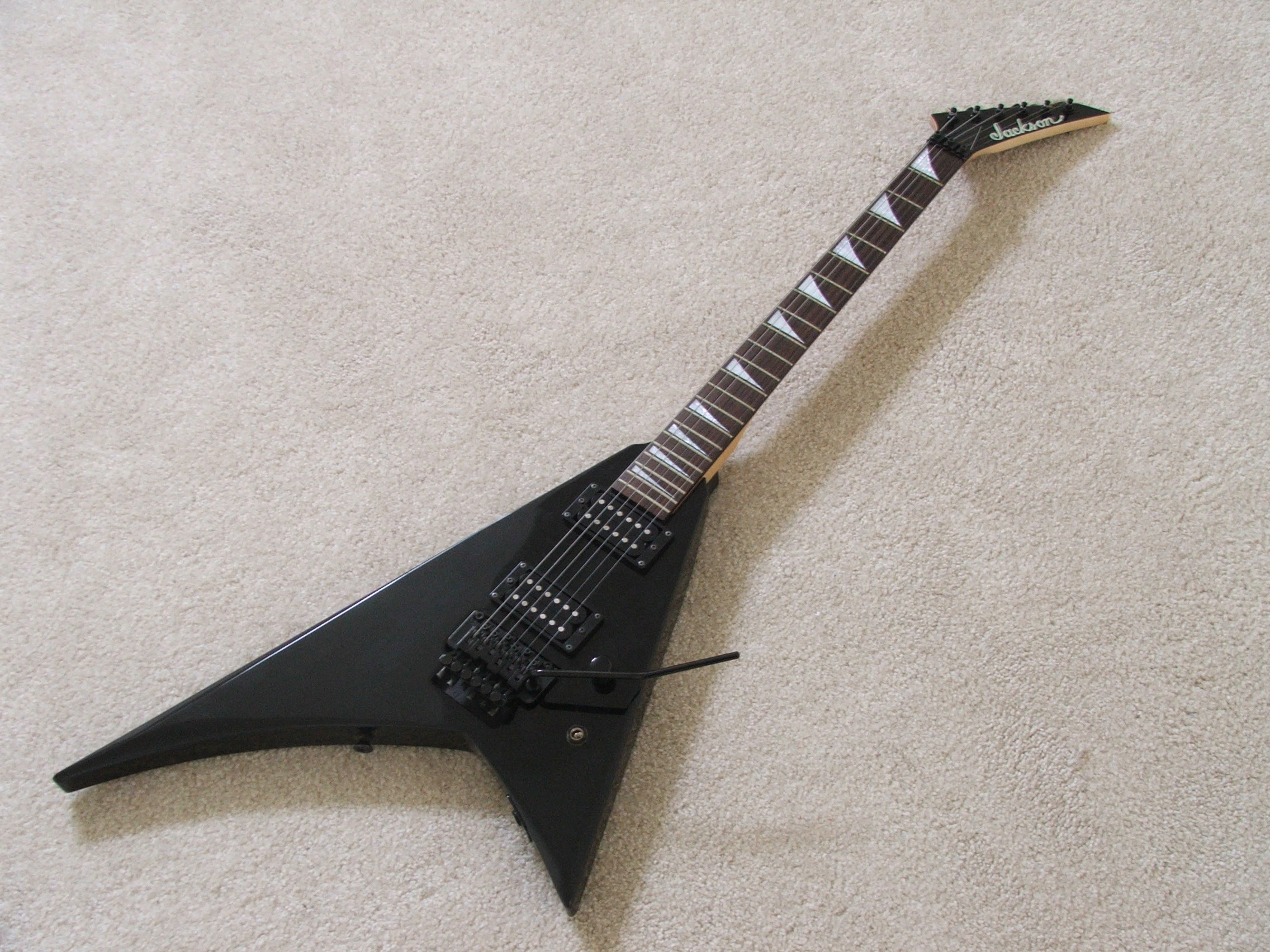
Jackson JS20 RR model

The basic model in the USA Select Series is the RR1. The RR1 is made of alder with a maple neck-through design neck. The ebony fretboard has 22 jumbo frets. The RR1 is equipped with two Seymour Duncan humbuckers and a Floyd Rose original 2 point double locking tremolo at the bridge. The RR1 has four variations:

- RR1: the standard Rhoads USA made guitar
- RR1T: the RR1 with an adjustable string-through-body bridge
- RR1 Left-Handed: left-handed version of the RR1
- RR1T Left-Handed: left-handed version of the RR1T
- RR2: bolt-on neck, USA made, Jackson JT580LP bridge, pickup Kent Armstrong JJB-0 bridge, JP-11 neck (produced 1996–1997)

=== Pro Series ===
The Pro series is the mid-market Rhoads series. RR3, RR5, RR5FR, RR24, and RR24M were made in Japan. Newer models are made in Indonesia.

- RR3: RR3 has an alder body and a bolt-on maple neck with 22 jumbo frets on a rosewood fretboard. This model has Seymour Duncan humbuckers in neck and bridge, and a Floyd Rose Licensed Jackson low-profile double-locking tremolo. During 2007, a limited run of 100 were made in ivory (white) with black pinstripes, similar to the finish found on RR5 in ivory. The limited run of RR3 features Duncan-designed humbuckers and string-through body. Indonesian RR3 models from 2016 onwards have a neck-through construction and 1000-series Floyd Rose double-locking tremolo.
- RR5: RR5 has a maple through-body neck with alder wings and rosewood fretboard. The main difference between RR5 and RR3 is a neck-through and a fixed bridge for RR5 vs a bolt-on neck and a floating bridge for RR3. RR5 also features gold hardware, Seymour Duncan TB4 and SH4 humbucker pickups, and a string-through body. RR5 production years: 2000-2012 Japan (six digit serial stamped on last fret YYXXXX ex. 07XXXX=2007).
- RR5FR: RR5FR is mostly the same as RR5 except it has a Floyd Rose FRT-O2000 tremolo bridge, black hardware (as opposed to gold), and is available in black, ivory, and pink pearl finishes.
- RR24 (discontinued): RR24 has an alder body and a maple neck with an ebony fretboard. This model differs from RR3 and RR5 in that it is a 24-fret guitar. It has a neck-through body construction and original Floyd Rose tremolo. This model is fitted with only one pickup (EMG 81) in the bridge position and a single volume control. This model is also available in custom colors.
- RR24M (discontinued): RR24M is mostly the same as RR24, but it has a maple fretboard as opposed to the traditional ebony fretboard.
- RRMG: RRMG has an ebony fretboard on a maple neck, 22 jumbo frets, a Jackson speed neck, a Floyd Rose® special double locking 2-point tremolo, an EMG 81 and an EMG 89. The pickups are direct mounted.
- RRTMG: RRTMG is mostly the same as RRMG except it has a string-through body (no Floyd Rose tremolo). T stands for "through" models.
- RRT-3: (2014)
- RRT-5: (2014)

=== Pro Series Artist Signature ===
- Kevin Bond Signature (discontinued): This model has a mahogany neck-through body and 22 jumbo frets. It is fitted with a Seymour Duncan "Iommi" humbucker, and adjustable string-through-body Schaller fine-tuning tailpiece. The Jackson logo is blood red.
- Matt Tuck Signature (discontinued): This model has an alder neck-through body and maple neck (with scarf joint head stock), and 22 jumbo frets. It is fitted with an EMG 81 humbucker at the bridge, and EMG 85 humbucker at the neck. The bridge is a JT390 adjustable string-through-body type with Sperzel locking die-cast tuners. This is the only current model with a reversed headstock.

=== X Series ===
The X series RX10D has an alder body with a maple bolt-on neck. The Rosewood fingerboard has 22 frets, and pickups are both Seymour Duncan-designed humbuckers. The bridge is a Jackson double locking tremolo unit.

The Jackson X Series also offers the Jackson RRXT. It has a basswood body with a through-body maple speed neck with tilt-back scarf. Pickups: Duncan-designed HB-102B humbucking bridge pickup and Duncan-designed HB-102N humbucking neck pickup.

In 2012, Jackson released the RRXMG.

=== JS Series ===
The JS30RR is from the entry level group that is made in India. The body is Indian cedro and has a bolt-on maple neck. It is fitted with two Jackson pickups and an adjustable string-through-body bridge, and the rosewood fretboard has 24 frets. This model was available with a Floyd Rose tremolo as the JS35RR, but was discontinued in 2000. The current JS series offering is the JS32T Rhoads. It's similar to the original JS30RR, with the addition of shark fin inlays on the fretboard. it also had the JS35RR which was an upgraded version of the standard JS30RR.
