= Stephen Thomas Erlewine =

American music journalist (born 1973)

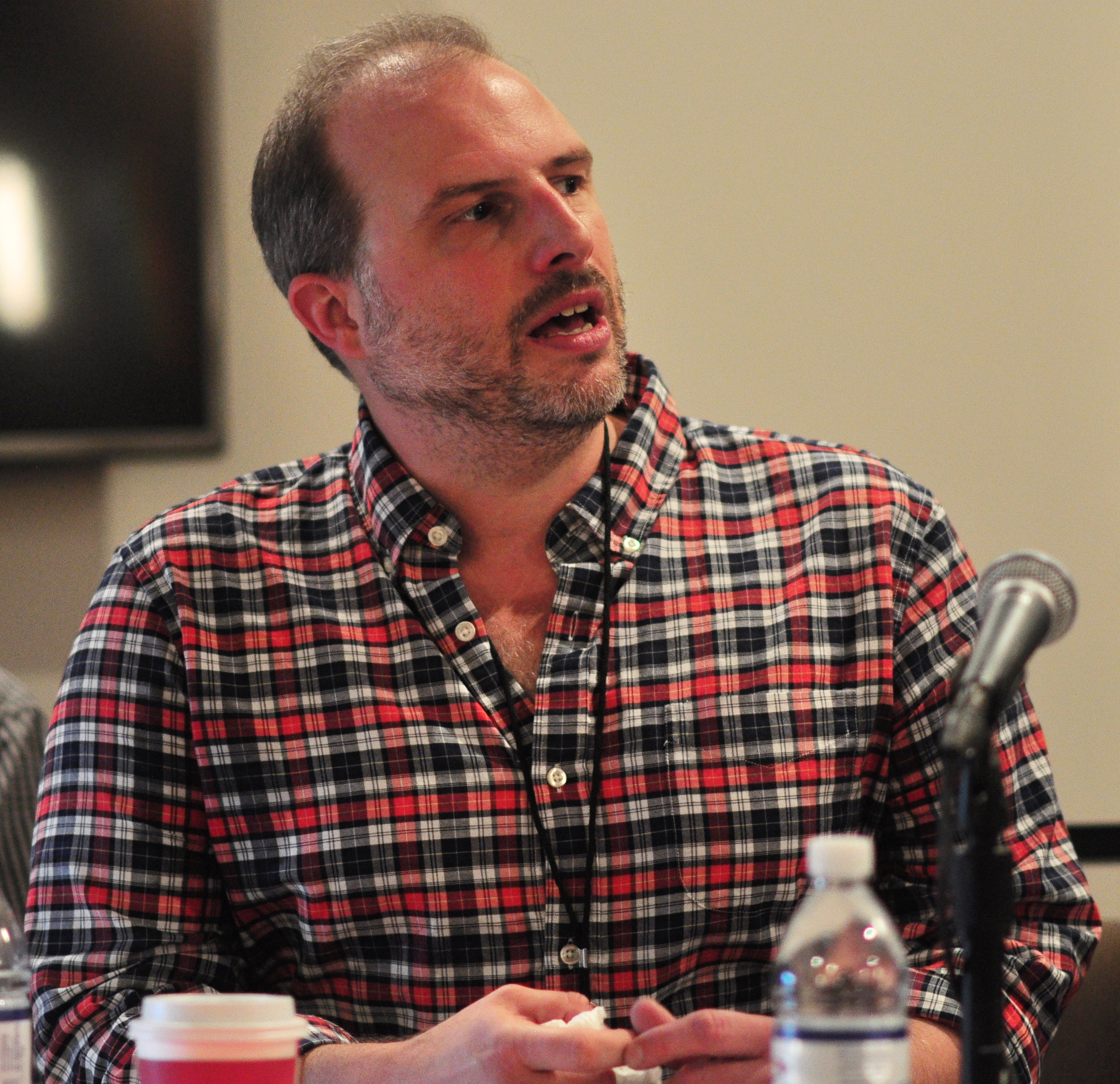
- Erlewine in 2017
- Born: June 18, 1973 (age 53); Ann Arbor, Michigan, U.S.
- Other name: Tom Erlewine
- Education: University of Michigan
- Occupation: Music critic
- Years active: 1991−present
- Employers: AllMusic; freelancer
- Spouse: Stephanie Erlewine (m. 2017)
- Relatives: Michael Erlewine (uncle); May Erlewine (cousin)

Stephen Thomas Erlewine (/ˈɜːrlwaɪn/; born June 18, 1973) is an American music critic and former senior editor for the online music database AllMusic. He is the author of multiple artist biographies and record reviews for AllMusic, as well as a freelance writer, occasionally contributing liner notes.

Erlewine was born in Ann Arbor, Michigan, and is a nephew of the former musician and AllMusic founder Michael Erlewine. At the University of Michigan he majored in English, was on the student newspaper The Michigan Daily, was a music editor (1993–1994) and then arts editor (1994–1995), and DJ'd at the campus radio station, WCBN. He has contributed to All Music Guide to the Blues: The Definitive Guide to the Blues and All Music Guide to Hip-Hop: The Definitive Guide to Rap & Hip-Hop.
