= Y2K =

Y2K most often refers to:

- Year 2000 problem, a computer issue related to the year 2000
- Y2K aesthetic, an Internet aesthetic
- Y2K fashion, a design style, fashion style, and aesthetic that was popular in the late 1990s and early 2000s
- Year 2K, the year 2000 ("Y" stands for "year", and "K" stands for "kilo-", which means "1000")
- Y2K pop, a style of pop music associated with the turn of the millennium

Y2K may also refer to:

== Film and television ==
- Y2K (1999 film), an American television film
- Y2K (2024 film), a disaster horror comedy film directed by Kyle Mooney
- Y2K (Athoba, 'Sex Krome Aasitechhe'), a short film, 2000
- "Y2K" (Dilbert), a television episode
- "Y2K" (My Name Is Earl), a television episode
- "Y2K", a fictional rock band in Rugrats (2021 TV series)

== Music ==
=== Albums ===
- Y2K (Beenie Man album), 1999
- Y2K!, 2024 album by Ice Spice
- Y2K: The Album, by Screwball, 2000
- Y2K (EP), by Converge, 1999

=== Other uses in music ===
- Y2K (record producer), American record producer
- Y2K HC Fest, now Fluff Fest, an annual hardcore punk festival in the Czech Republic
- "Y2K" (song), 2000 song by Screwball, off the album Y2K: The Album

== Other uses ==
- Y2K Turbine Superbike, a turbine-powered motorcycle launched by MTT in 2000
- Y2K, a Swedish designation for the DSB Class MF or IC3, a Danish-built train set
- YIIK: A Postmodern RPG, an RPG video game by Ackk Studios

== See also ==
- 2000 (disambiguation)
- 2K (disambiguation)
- Jackson Y2KV, a guitar designed by Dave Mustaine
