= Michael Erlewine =

American archivist of popular culture

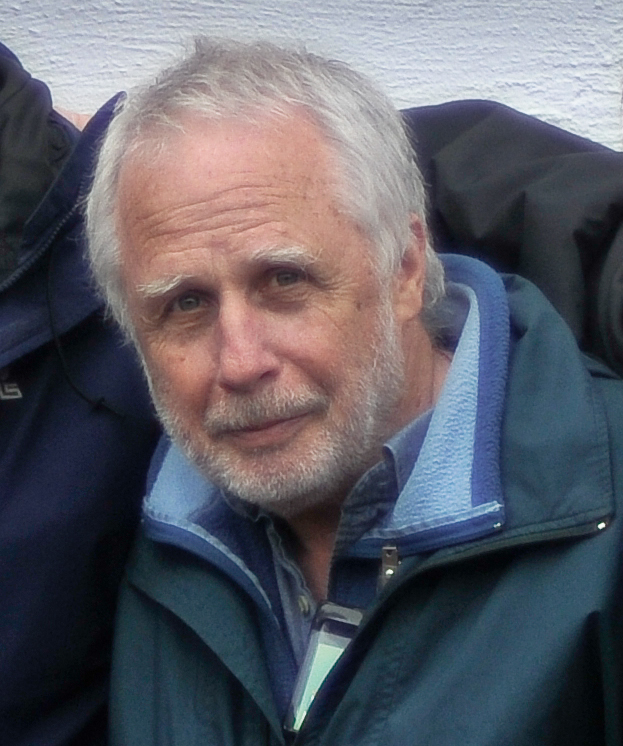
- Erlewine in 2008

Background information
- Born: John Michael Erlewine; July 18, 1941 (age 85); Lancaster, Pennsylvania, U.S.
- Origin: Michigan
- Genres: Folk; blues
- Occupations: Musician; astrologer; nature photographer; television host; entrepreneur
- Instruments: Vocals, harmonica
- Years active: late 1950s–2000s
- Formerly of: The Prime Movers

John Michael Erlewine (/ˈɜːrlwaɪn/; born July 18, 1941) is an American musician, astrologer, TV host, photographer, publisher, and Internet entrepreneur who founded the music online database site AllMusic (previously known as All Music Guide) in 1991.

== Biography ==
=== Early life ===
Erlewine was born in Lancaster, Pennsylvania. As a musician, he was active in the Michigan folk music scene in the late 1950s and early 1960s. In 1961, he hitchhiked with Bob Dylan, and traveled to Greenwich Village in Lower Manhattan, New York; Venice, a Los Angeles neighborhood; and San Francisco.

=== Music career ===
Erlewine, along with his younger brother Dan began a blues band called the Prime Movers, which regularly played in Chicago; other members included "Blue" Gene Tyranny (Robert Sheff). When the drummer left, the band replaced him with Iggy Pop (James Osterberg), then 18 years old. The Prime Movers gave him the nickname "Iggy" as he had played in the band The Iguanas. According to biographer Jim Ambrose, the two years Osterberg which was in the band made him aware of "art, politics, and experimentation."

=== Astrology ===
In 1977, Erlewine founded Matrix Software. He was the first person to program astrology on microcomputers and make astrological programs available to the astrological community. He has published more than forty books on astrology and related topics.

=== Honours ===
Michael Erlewine and his band, the Prime Movers, were inducted into the Michigan Rock and Roll Legends Hall of Fame in 2015.

=== Family ===
Erlewine and his wife have four children including musician May Erlewine. He is the uncle of music critic Stephen Thomas Erlewine.

=== All Music Guide ===
In the 1990s, Erlewine founded the All Music Guide (allmusic.com), the All Movie Guide (allmovie.com), and the All Game Guide (allgame.com). The first site in particular has become an important popular music reference which licenses its content to numerous other websites. Erlewine regained control of Matrix Software (astrologysoftware.com) in November 2008 and is the director of the company.

== Publications ==
- Erlewine, Michael, 1980, "Astrological programming manual", American Federation of Astrologers, Tempe, Arizona
- Erlewine, Michael, 1992, "All-Music Guide", editor (Miller-Freeman)
- Erlewine, Michael, 1999, "All-Music Guide to the Blues", editor (Miller-Freeman)
- Erlewine, Michael, 1999, "All-Music Guide to Rock", editor (Miller-Freeman)
- Erlewine, Michael, 1997, "All-Music Guide to Country", editor (Miller-Freeman)
- Erlewine, Michael, 1996, "All-Music Guide to Jazz", editor (Miller-Freeman)
- Erlewine, Michael, 1976, "The Sun Is Shining", paperback (Heart Center Publications)
- Erlewine, Michael, 1976, "Astrophysical Directions", paperback (Heart Center Publications)
- Erlewine, Michael, 1976, "Interface: Planetary Nodes”, paperback (Heart Center Publications)
- Erlewine, Michael, 1981, “Local Space: Relocation Astrology”, paperback (Heart Center Publications)
- Erlewine, Michael, “Tibetan Earth Lords: Tibetan Astrology and Geomancy”, paperback (Heart Center Publications)
- Erlewine, Michael, 2007, “Astrology's Mirror: Full-Phase Aspects”, paperback (Heart Center Publications)
- Erlewine, Michael, 1998, “Our Pilgrimage to Tibet”, paperback (Heart Center Publications)
- Erlewine, Michael, 1980, “Burn Rate: Retrogrades in Astrology”, paperback (Heart Center Publications)
- Erlewine, Michael, 2005, “Mother Moon: Astrology of 'The Lights'”, paperback (Heart Center Publications)
- Erlewine, Michael, 2007, “Interpret Astrology: The 360 3-Way Combinations”, paperback (Heart Center Publications)
- Erlewine, Michael, 2007, “Interpret Astrology: The House Combinations”, paperback (Heart Center Publications)
- Erlewine, Michael, 2007, “Interpret Astrology: The Planetary Combinations”, paperback (Heart Center Publications)
- Erlewine, Michael, 2008, “Astrology of the Heart: Astro-Shamanism”, paperback (Heart Center Publications)
- Erlewine, Michael, 2008, “The Astrology of Space”, paperback (Heart Center Publications)
- Erlewine, Michael, 2008, “StarTypes: Life-Path Partners”, paperback (Heart Center Publications)
- Erlewine, Michael, 2008, “How to Learn Astrology”, paperback (Heart Center Publications)
- Erlewine, Michael, 2008, “The Art of Feng Shui”, paperback (Heart Center Publications)
- Erlewine, Michael, 2008, “Tibetan Astrology”, paperback (Heart Center Publications)
- Erlewine, Michael, 2010, “Experiences with Mahamudra”, paperback (Heart Center Publications)
- Erlewine, Michael, 2010, “Nature in the Backyard”, paperback (Heart Center Publications)
- Erlewine, Michael, 2010, “Dharma Poems”, paperback (Heart Center Publications)
- Erlewine, Michael and Stanley Livingston, 2010, “Blues in Black & White: The Landmark Ann Arbor Blues Festivals”, paperback (University of Michigan Press)
