= Seymour W. Duncan =

American luthier

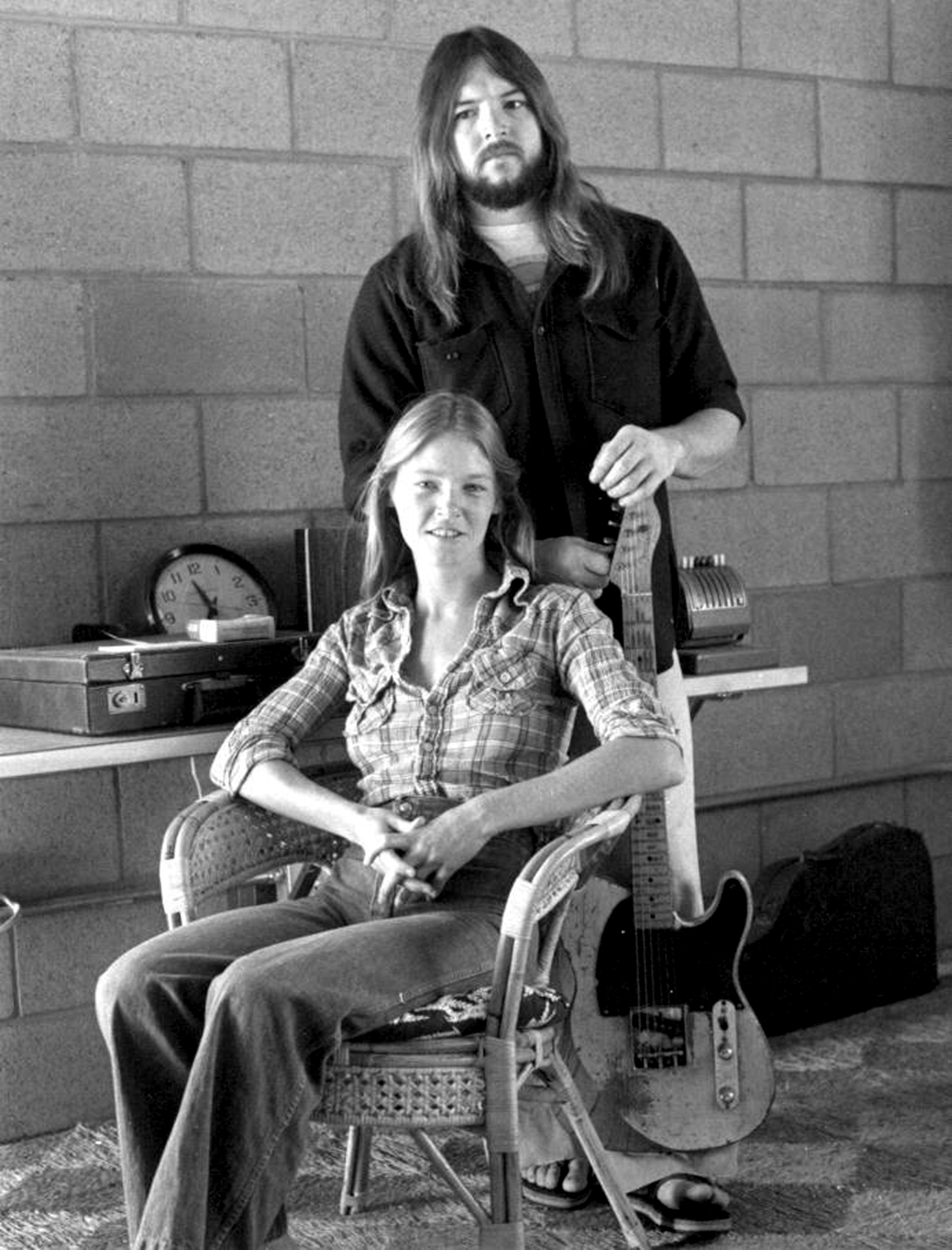
- Seymour Duncan and Cathy Carter Duncan
- Born: February 11, 1951 (age 75); Camden, New Jersey, U.S.
- Occupations: Luthier; businessman; musician
- Years active: 1976–present

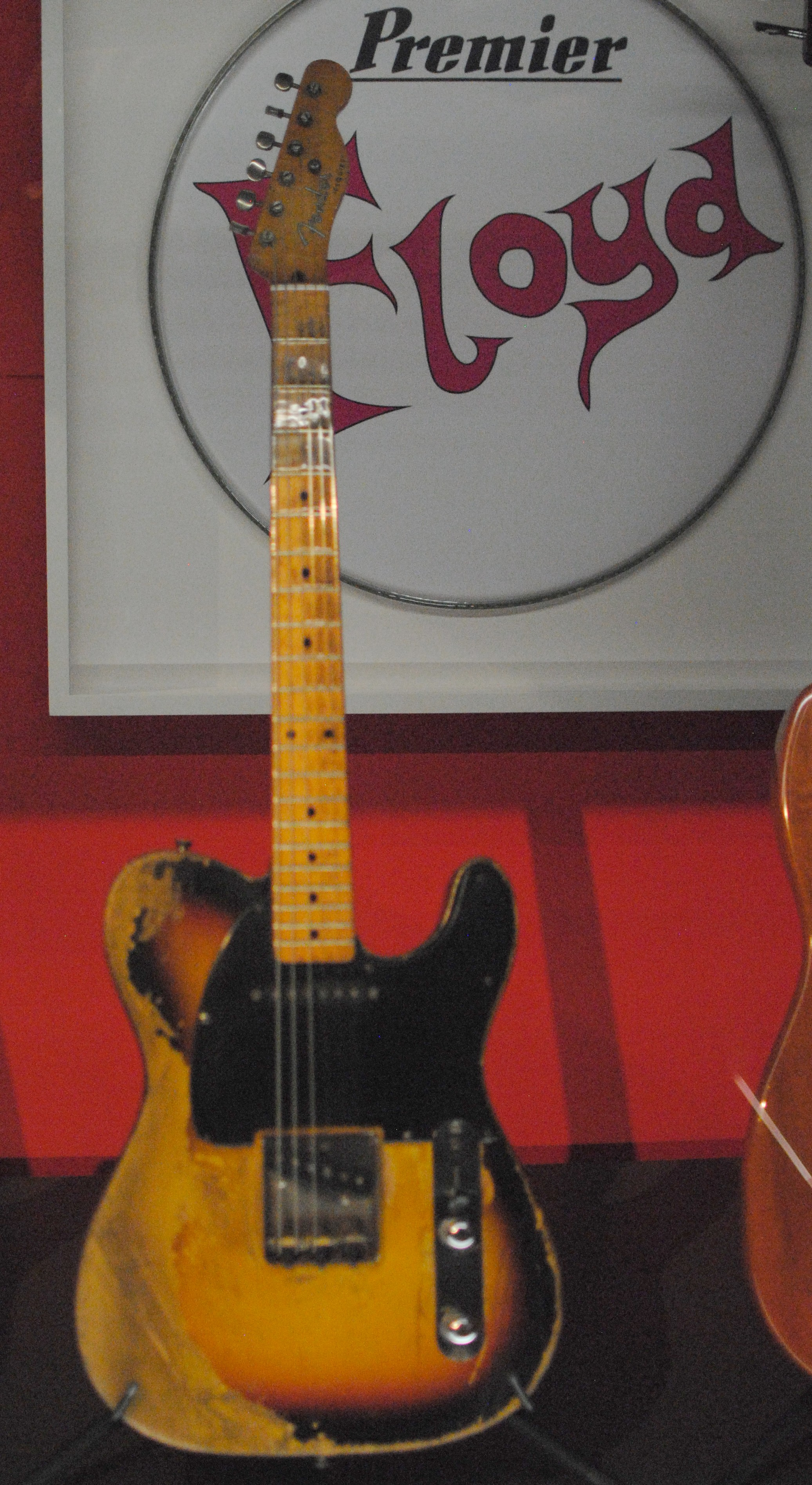
Fender Esquire guitar (1952), sold by Duncan to David Gilmour of Pink Floyd, at which point it already had a Fender Stratocaster pickup in the neck position. Seen displayed at the Pink Floyd: Their Mortal Remains exhibition.

Seymour W. Duncan (born February 11, 1951) is an American businessman and a co-founder of the Seymour Duncan Company, a manufacturer of guitar pickups, bass pickups, and effects pedals located in Santa Barbara, California.

== Early life ==
Duncan was born in Camden, New Jersey. He was introduced to guitar by his uncle, and would regularly visit his uncle's house to practice guitar. His earliest influences included Bill Haley & His Comets, Neil LeVang, Buddy Merrill, James Burton and Ricky Nelson. At age 12, his uncle introduced him to Les Paul after a show at Steel Pier. Duncan received his own guitar and amp as a Christmas present at the age of 13.

In his teens, Duncan attended Woodstown High School. He also began playing at various shows in Atlantic City, Philadelphia, Wildwood, and Somers Point. He first began winding pickups at age 16 when his Fender Telecaster's pickup broke after lending it at a show. Lacking proper equipment, Duncan improvised tools such as using a butter knife as a soldering iron, a microscope from school to analyze the pickup, and a record player to rewind the pickup bobbin. Having rewound the pickup bobbin tighter than it initially was, Duncan noted a "fatter" tone from the guitar. This inspired him to further experiment with pickups and tonality.

== Career ==
=== Luthiery career ===
==== 1960s: Early career ====
In the mid '60s, Duncan began working at local music stores for guitar repair work. While working, Duncan began creating his own designs and parts to experiment with various tonal qualities. He would reach out to various sources for advice such as Les Paul, Seth Lover, and Fender Musical Instruments. Overtime, Duncan built his reputation among musicians through word of mouth.

In 1968, Duncan received a message from Jimi Hendrix's manager that Hendrix wanted to meet him. Duncan met with Hendrix at Xavier University on March 28, 1968, where he gifted Hendrix with custom made pickups.

At Les Paul's suggestion, he moved to England in 1973 where he met up with Roy Buchanan and his manager, Jaye Reich, who were recording at Polydor Records. While Duncan initially moved to England to record music, he also found opportunities working in the Repair and R&D Departments at the Fender Soundhouse in London.

While at Fender, Duncan did repairs and rewinds for artists, including Eric Clapton of Cream, George Harrison of The Beatles, Jimmy Page of Led Zeppelin, Pete Townshend of The Who, and David Gilmour of Pink Floyd.

Duncan was also introduced to Jeff Beck during his time at the Fender Soundhouse. Duncan gifted Beck with a "Tele-Gib", a Telecaster with a humbucking pickup reminiscent of a Gibson pickup. The Tele-Gib was a prototype of Duncan's JB model.

After his visa expired, Duncan came back to the United States and eventually settled in California. In 1975, he moved to Santa Barbara. He established contact with people such as Leo Fender, Les Paul, and Seth Lover and continued learning about and making pickups.

==== 1976–present: Seymour Duncan Company ====
As demand for his custom pickups grew, he started his own company with Cathy Carter Duncan, Seymour Duncan in 1976.

In the 1990s, as a demand for vintage guitars began to rise, Duncan sought to replicate the tonal quality of 1950s to 1960s rock and roll through pre-aging specific pickups. The result was the Seymour Duncan Antiquity pickups. Duncan would also continue to design custom pickups for guitarists as well. Notable artists and groups Duncan has created pickups for include Lady Gaga, Madonna, Prince, Bon Jovi, Earth, Wind and Fire, and Hall & Oates.

From the 1980s, Seymour Duncan also made bass pickups under the Basslines brand name. In 2013 these bass pickups were rebranded under Seymour Duncan without redesigning the pickups.

Fender Custom Shop makes a Seymour Duncan Signature Esquire. Duncan is still involved in designing and fabricating pickups at the factory as well as playing guitar and making appearances at clinics and conventions.

=== Performing ===
As a performer, Duncan has guested on the albums of several artists. He has also been the lead guitarist for the Stone Age Institute Band.

== Awards ==
Duncan was inducted into the Vintage Guitar Hall of Fame in 2011. In 2012, he was inducted into Guitar Player's Hall of Fame and received a Lifetime Achievement Award from Music & Sound Retailer Magazine. He was awarded an honorary Ph.D. from Duquesne University.

== Discography ==
Year	Album	Artist	Credit
1975	Home of the Brave	Chris Rainbow	Bass
1978	Looking Over My Shoulder	Chris Rainbow	Bass
1992	East Side Story	Kid Frost	Guitar, engineer, mixing
1993	American Music	Bugs Henderson and the Shuffle Kings	Guest appearance
1996	1996	Merle Haggard	Guitar (electric)
1997	Guitar Zeus, Vol. 2: Channel Mind Radio	Carmine Appice's Guitar Zeus	Performer
1998	Lost Years	Dave Mendenhall	Guitar
2000	Best of Chris Rainbow, 1972–1980	Chris Rainbow	Guitar
2006	Ultimate Guitar Zeus	Carmine Appice Project	Guitar
2011	TBA	Seymour Duncan	Guitar
