= The Prime Movers (Michigan band) =

American blues band

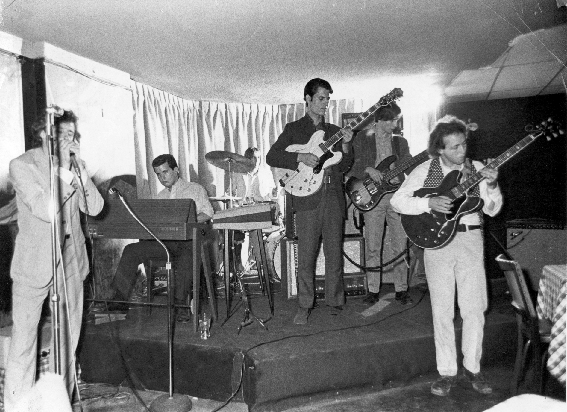
- Prime Movers at Living End 1966

Background information
- Origin: Ann Arbor, Michigan, United States
- Genres: Blues, garage rock
- Years active: 1965–1970
- Members: Michael Erlewine; Dan Erlewine; Robert Sheff; Robert Vinopal; Spider Winn; Jack Dawson; James Osterberg; Jesse Crawford

The Prime Movers were an American blues band based in Ann Arbor, Michigan, United States, which was formed in 1965. The band originally consisted of Michael Erlewine (lead singer, harmonica), Dan Erlewine (lead guitar), Robert Sheff (keyboards), Robert Vinopal (bass), and Michael "Spider" Wynn (drums). Vinopal left soon after the band's formation and was replaced by Jack Dawson. Wynn left a short time later and was replaced by James Osterberg, who would later become famous as Iggy Pop. When he joined the Prime Movers Osterberg took the name "Iggy", from his previous band The Iguanas.

The Prime Movers played throughout the Midwest. In 1966, the band frequented blues clubs in Chicago, where they saw blues musicians including Little Walter, Magic Sam, Big Walter Horton, and many others perform. Courted by a subsidiary of Motown Records who wanted to promote them as a white group playing "black" music, the band refused to cooperate, preferring to study and perform classic Chicago blues than to record songs that were fed to them by Motown. A consequence of this is that they were not professionally recorded. Recordings made by the band and fans surfaced years later, including a recording of Iggy Pop singing the Muddy Waters song "I'm a Man."

The Prime Movers played a significant part in helping to host the first two Ann Arbor Blues Festivals, in 1969 and 1970, which were the first (and largest) blues festivals (in terms of the number of great bluesman who performed) in the U.S. Michael Erlewine interviewed dozens of the performers, and the spirit of these early festivals carried over into the Ann Arbor Blues & Jazz Festival in 1972, 1973, and 1974. Members of the band were also involved in the 1972 festival.

In 1967, the band toured the West Coast and spent the Summer of Love in San Francisco, living at the Sausalito Heliport, and playing at places like The Matrix, The Straight Theater, the Haight A, New Orleans House, and the Fillmore West, where they opened for Cream.

Iggy Pop was replaced by Jesse Crawford in early 1967. Crawford later became famous as the MC for the MC5, belting out the phrase "Kick out the jams, Motherfucker…" that kicked off their shows. Bob Sheff briefly joined Iggy and the Stooges in 1973 and went on to become an avant garde composer and musician who collaborated with John Cage, Laurie Anderson among others under the pseudonym Blue Gene Tyranny. The band went through some 37 members, and broke up by 1970. The Erlewine brothers continued to play around the Ann Arbor area for some years after that. Michael Erlewine had a solo piano act as late as 1971, and went on to found AllMusic, while Dan Erlewine became an accomplished luthier and prolific author on guitar repair, notably for Guitar Player magazine.

== Sources ==
- Nilson, Per, 1990, The Wild One: The True Story of Iggy Pop (Music Sales Corp), ISBN 978-0-8464-2975-3
- Iggy Pop, 1997, Iggy Pop: I Need More (Two thirteen sixty One Publications), ISBN 978-1-880985-43-4
- Antonia, Nina, 1997, Iggy Pop, Virgin Books, ISBN 978-1-85227-698-0
- Undemuth, Nicolas, 2002 Iggy Pop (J’ai Lu Publishing) ISBN 978-2-290-32058-7
- Adams, Richard, 2005, The Complete Iggy Pop (Reynolds & Hearn) 256 Pages, ISBN 978-1-905287-02-4
- Trynka, Paul, 2007, Iggy: Open Up and Bleed (Broadway Books) Chapter on The Prime Movers Blues Band ISBN 978-0-7679-2319-4
- Ambrose, Joe, 2008, Iggy Pop: Gimmie Danger (Omnibus Press), 324 pages, ISBN 978-1-84772-116-7
