= Vintage Guitar (magazine) =

American magazine

- Editor-in-Chief: Ward Meeker
- Publisher: Alan Greenwood
- Founded: September 1986; 39 years ago (as The Music Trader)
- Country: United States
- Based in: Bismarck, North Dakota, U.S.
- Website: vintageguitar.com

Vintage Guitar is an American magazine that focuses on vintage and classic guitars, amplifiers, effects, and related equipment, as well as notable guitarists from all genres and eras. The publication's feature stories and monthly columns cover a diverse range of topics by contributors, including some of the biggest names in the industry and renowned authorities like Dan Erlewine, George Gruhn, Wolf Marshall, Richard Smith, and Seymour W. Duncan, as well as some of the best-known writers in the field, including Michael Wright, Pete Prown, Walter Carter, Dan Forte, Dave Hunter, Rich Kienzle, Michael Dregni, John Peden, Oscar Jordan, and others. Other editorial content focuses on reviews of music as well as informed, objective reviews of new gear.

Originally published as The Music Trader, its inaugural issue was distributed in September, 1986, with the intent of achieving two goals: to supply musicians with a market to buy and sell instruments and equipment or locate other musicians, and to inform and entertain readers. Today, these remain the basic goals of the magazine. Though The Music Trader was a publication for all types of instruments, the majority of advertisements and articles were guitar-centric. In 1989, publisher Alan Greenwood changed its name to Vintage Guitar magazine because he felt it better represented the publication.

== VG Classics ==
From 1993–1997, Vintage Guitar also published the periodical VG Classics. Much like the monthly, it focused on classic guitars and amps but in a traditionally-sized format on thicker, glossy stock and employing layouts designed to highlight the artistic photography commissioned for its use. In 2001, VG began using glossy paper in the editorial sections of its monthly offering.

== Vintage Guitar books ==
For more than two decades, the magazine has also published The Official Vintage Guitar Price Guide through its Vintage Guitar Books imprint. Adapted from the 1988 article "Asking Price – Selling Price", The Guide originally appeared as a monthly installment titled "The Instrument Price Guide" in the April '89 issue. In 1992, the company issued the first version of The Guide as a booklet, and today the annual book compiles historical data and lists values on more than 2,000 brands derived from comprehensive research and market analysis on thousands of vintage and recent–model guitars, amps, basses, effects pedals, mandolins, lap steels, ukuleles, and banjos. It is regarded by professional players, guitar dealers, and collectors as the premier source for accurate values on vintage gear. To date, The Guide has sold more than 150,000 copies, and in 2012 it became available on digital e–readers.

The company's Vintage Guitar Book imprint has published several other books:

- Stellas & Stratocasters (1994), by Willie G. Moseley, is an anthology of articles, interviews, and columns from the pages of VG, including talks with Eric Johnson, Jeff Cook, and Noel Redding.
- Guitar Stories: Volume One (1995), by Michael Wright, is a look at the histories of some of the more interesting instruments that have – successfully and sometimes unsuccessfully – tried to win the hearts of Americans dreaming of their 15 minutes of fame strapped to a six–string.
- Executive Rock: A Fan's Perspective on the Evolution of Popular Music Since 1950 (1996), by Willie G. Moseley, is a collection of essays that originally appeared in the VG column "Executive Rock."
- Guitar Stories: Volume Two (2000), by Michael Wright, continues where Volume One left off. A foray into more brands that made a heavy impact in the world of the guitar, and how its many forms came to be. More than 800 rare photos help tell the tale of these instruments, from the innovations of Mario Maccaferri to Martin's journeys into the solid body kingdom.
- Guitar People (1997), by Willie G. Moseley, includes 65 profiles and interviews with guitar players and builders, discussing equipment, bands, and performances.
- Bill Carson: My Life and Time with Fender Musical Instruments (1998), by Bill Carson with Willie G. Moseley, is the inspiring, quintessential American success story of Bill Carson and Fender.

== Online ==
Since 1995, VG has maintained a website that features archival editorial content, the magazine's Hall of Fame page, an RSS feed with the latest industry news, regular promotional giveaways, a store in which it sells books and other merchandise, and various other features. The magazine also maintains a Twitter account that features news from industry insiders and insight into the latest products, gear and technology, and more. And in 2012, the magazine began publishing a twice-monthly e-newsletter called VG Overdrive, or VGOD.

== Hall of Fame ==
Each year, Vintage Guitar magazine honors those who inspire and awe guitar players, fans, and listeners by inducting great players, innovators, and instruments to the VG Hall of Fame. The Hall of Fame began in 1990 with the induction of the Fender Stratocaster and Gibson Les Paul Standard. Today, the Hall of Fame includes four categories: Instrument, Innovator, Player, and Album of the Year. Nominations are solicited from contributors and visitors to the magazine's web site.

=== Innovators ===
- 2011 – Seymour W. Duncan
- 2010 – Paul Reed Smith
- 2009 – George Fullerton
- 2008 – Floyd Rose
- 2007 – Dick Denney
- 2006 – John D'Angelico
- 2005 – John Dopyera and Rudy Dopyera
- 2004 – Hartley Peavey
- 2003 – Lloyd Loar
- 2002 – Paul Bigsby
- 1999 – Adolf Rickenbacker
- 1998 – Jim Marshall
- 1997 – Seth Lover
- 1996 – C.F. Martin, Sr.
- 1995 – Ted McCarty
- 1993 – Les Paul
- 1992 – Orville Gibson
- 1991 – Leo Fender

=== Instruments ===
- 2011 – Fender Deluxe Reverb
- 2010 – Gibson Byrdland
- 2009 – Gibson SG Standard
- 2008 – Gibson Les Paul Model (Goldtop)
- 2007 – Gibson J-45 and Vox AC15
- 2006 – Fender Jaguar and Gibson ES-5
- 2005 – Mesa-Boogie Mark I & National Tricone series
- 2004 – PRS Custom & Gretsch White Falcon
- 2003 – Gibson Les Paul Custom & Marshall Super Lead 100
- 2002 – Fender Jazzmaster & Gibson SJ-200
- 1999 – Vox Wah & Gibson ES-150
- 1998 – Fender Bassman
- 1997 – Rickenbacker 360/12
- 1996 – Gibson Flying V & Gretsch 6120
- 1995 – Fender Jazz Bass & Fender Twin amp
- 1994 – Gibson L-5 & Vox AC-30 amp
- 1993 – D'Angelico New Yorker & Gibson Super 400
- 1992 – Fender Precision Bass & Gibson ES-335
- 1991 – Martin D-28 & Fender Telecaster
- 1990 – Fender Stratocaster & Gibson Les Paul Standard

=== Players ===
- 2011 – Keith Richards
- 2010 – Robert Johnson
- 2009 – Buddy Guy
- 2008 – Duane Allman
- 2007 – Les Paul
- 2006 – Stevie Ray Vaughan
- 2005 – Django Reinhardt
- 2004 – George Harrison
- 2003 – Jeff Beck
- 2002 – Chuck Berry
- 1999 – Jimmy Page
- 1998 – Eric Clapton
- 1997 – B. B. King
- 1996 – Chet Atkins
- 1994 – Jimi Hendrix
