= Jackson Guitars =

Manufacturer of electric guitars and electric bass guitars

- Type: Subsidiary
- Industry: Musical instruments
- Founded: 1980; 46 years ago in Glendora, California, U.S.
- Founder: Grover Jackson
- Headquarters: Scottsdale, Arizona, U.S.
- Area served: Worldwide
- Products: Electric guitars Bass guitars
- Parent: Fender
- Website: jacksonguitars.com

Jackson is an American brand of guitars sold by the Fender Musical Instruments Corporation. Jackson was originally an independent manufacturer of electric guitars and electric bass guitars named after its founder, the American luthier Grover Jackson. The company was acquired by Fender in 2002, which manufactures Jackson-branded guitars in its Corona, California, US, and Ensenada, Mexico facilities, as well as contract production at FujiGen in Japan. Low-priced "budget" models are produced by sub-contractors in Indonesia and China.

== History ==
=== Early years ===
In the late 1970s, Jackson was there to help usher in a new breed of guitar player – the glammed-up hair metal virtuoso. Priding themselves on high-performance instruments that would allow players to achieve new heights on the instrument, Jackson quickly established themselves as a force to be reckoned with in the shred guitar game. By the middle of the '80s, the once small Southern California guitar repair shop was now at the forefront of the pointy headstock, gassed-up super guitar movement.

— Daryl Robertson of Guitar World (May 24, 2023)

Grover Jackson obtained part ownership in Charvel's Guitar Repair of Glendora, California in the 1970s. Wayne Charvel eventually filed bankruptcy and sold his interest to Grover Jackson on November 10, 1978, which gave Jackson control of the Charvel name.

Jackson Guitars originated in 1980 when guitarist Randy Rhoads approached the company with an idea for an individualized guitar. The collaborative design effort between Rhoads, Grover Jackson, Tim Wilson, and Jackson's masterbuilder, Mike Shannon, resulted in the creation of the Concorde, an innovative revamp of the traditional Flying V. These designs were such a departure from Charvel's Stratocaster-based models that Jackson elected to label them under a different brand name. He chose his own last name, and created the first Jackson guitar.

Throughout the heavy metal heyday of the 1980s, the Jackson brand was associated with high-quality, American-made, custom instruments, and was used by many popular guitarists of the period. In addition to the original, as they came to be known, Rhoads models, the 1980s spawned distinctively designed Jackson models such as the Soloist, King V, Kelly, and the Dinky, all of which remain icons of the brand.

=== 1990s–present ===
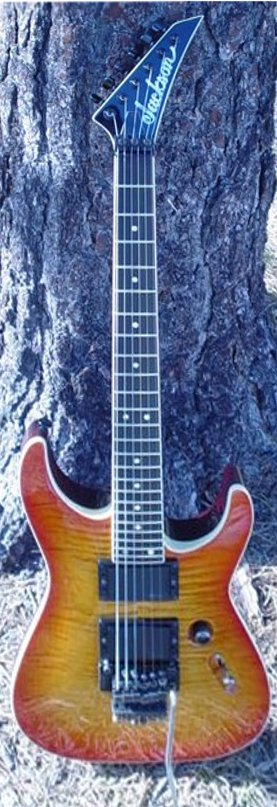
Soloist model

The 1990s brought changes in musical trends. While still making the high-end American-made products, brands like Jackson began producing inexpensive, Asian-made versions of their staple designs in an effort to make their products more accessible to lower-end buyers.

Guitars made for Jackson by Chushin Japan could be of particularly high quality. An example the King V Pro Dave Mustaine signature model was equipped with the same pickups, hardware and materials as the Ontario Jackson Shop version. (Chushin also produced some domestic market guitars under the Grover Jackson name.)

In the Fall of 2002, Fender Musical Instruments Corporation purchased Jackson from IMC, the company which had bought Jackson from Grover Jackson, and U.S. operations were moved to the Fender factory in Corona. Medium-high-end Jackson guitars were briefly made in Japan. Present day Fender-era Jackson and Charvel guitars are produced at Corona, California, Fujigen Nagano and Fender's Ensenada facility. Low-priced "budget" models are produced by sub-contractors based in Indonesia and China.

After several years of running a company doing sub-contracting work for many well known guitar companies and extensive design consultancy, Grover Jackson is now co-owner of a new guitar brand, GJ2 Guitars, in Orange County, California. His partner in this venture is former Fender Senior Vice President Jon Gold.

== Design hallmarks ==
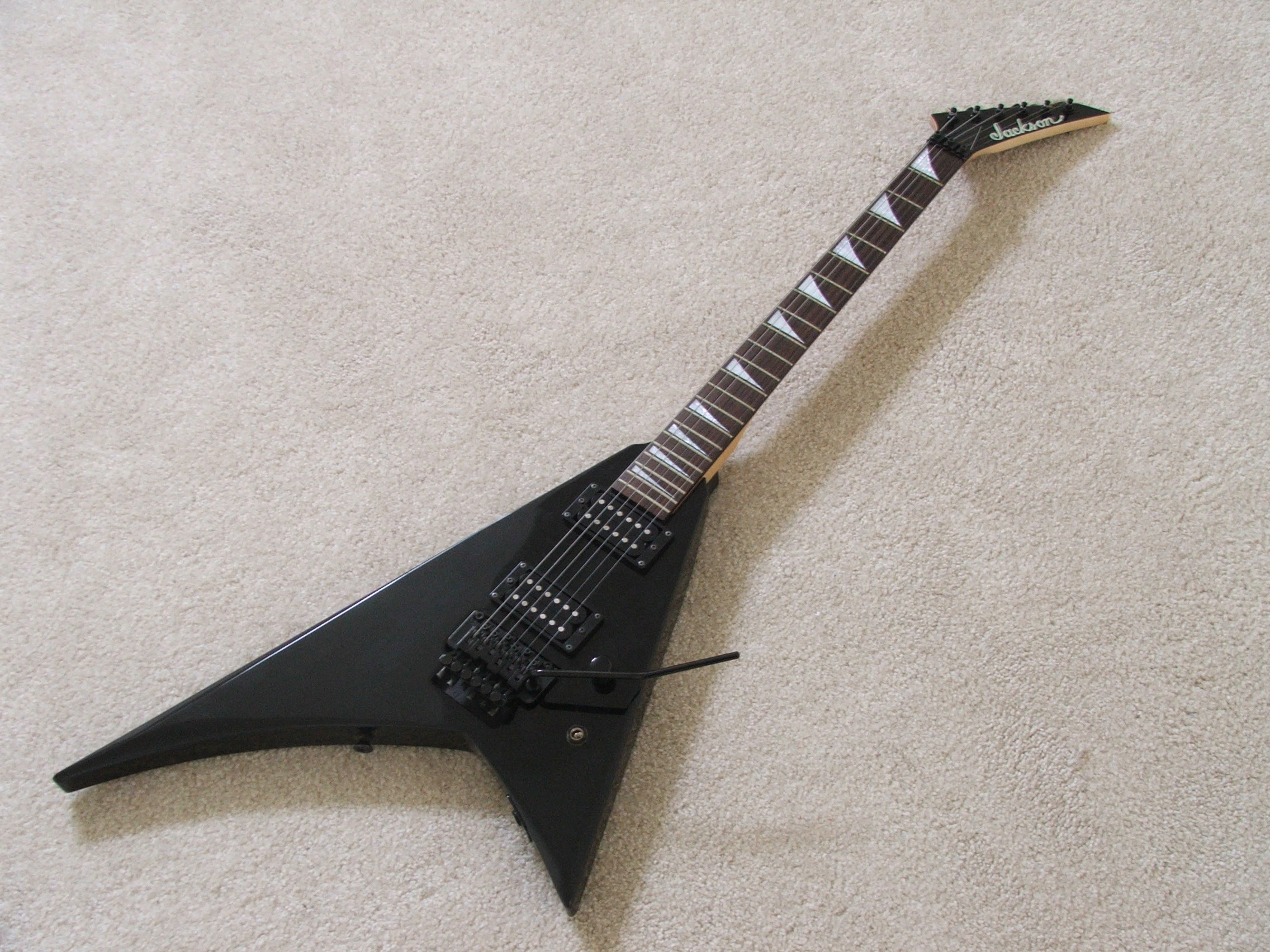
Randy Rhoads model

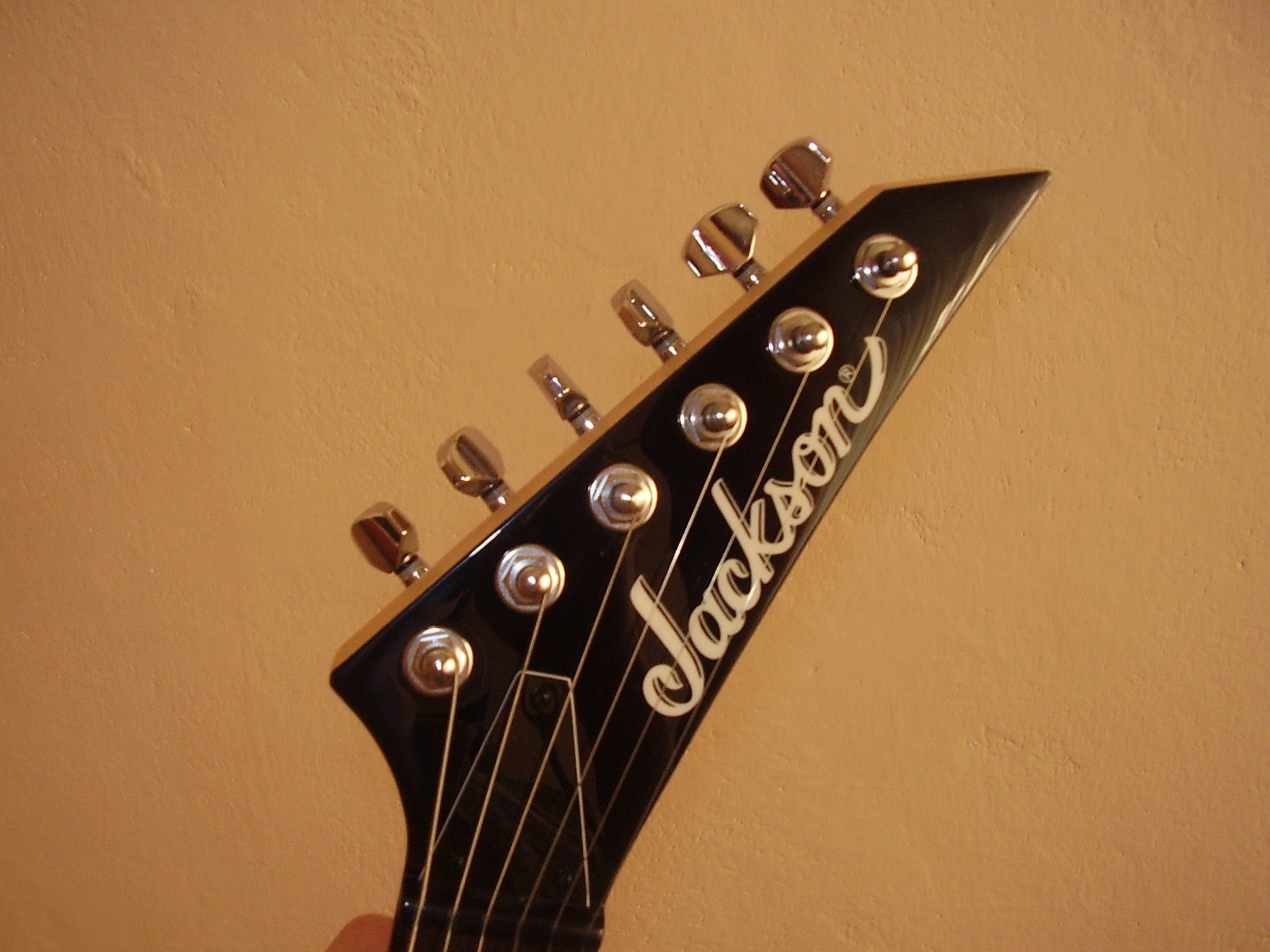
The distinctive Jackson headstock

From the earliest beginnings until the present day, Jackson Guitars is known for its slender, elegant designs, and feature aggressive motifs that are popular with hard rock and metal musicians.

Traditionally, Jackson (and many Charvel) guitars share the typical pointed headstock that first appeared on Randy Rhoads's prototype in 1980. This likely arose from trade dress infringement issues as a result of Charvel's use of Fender Stratocaster shaped headstocks until the early 1980s. Fender's 2002 acquisition of both the Jackson and Charvel brands has enabled the Strat-style headstock to be reintroduced (under license).

Another Jackson trademark is the 'shark fin' inlays, which inspired other famous guitar companies such as Ibanez to follow suit with similar designs.

Jackson 2021 guitar models: Concert Bass, Demmelition Fury, Dinky, Dominion, Juggernaut, Kelly, Kelly Bird, King V, MF 1, Monarkh, PC 1, Rhoads, San Dimas, Shadowcaster, Soloist, Spectra Bass, Star, Warrior.
