= Seymour Duncan =

American manufacturer of guitar accessories

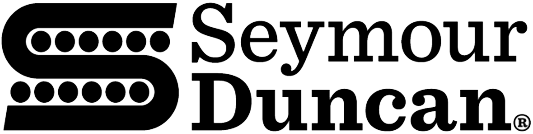

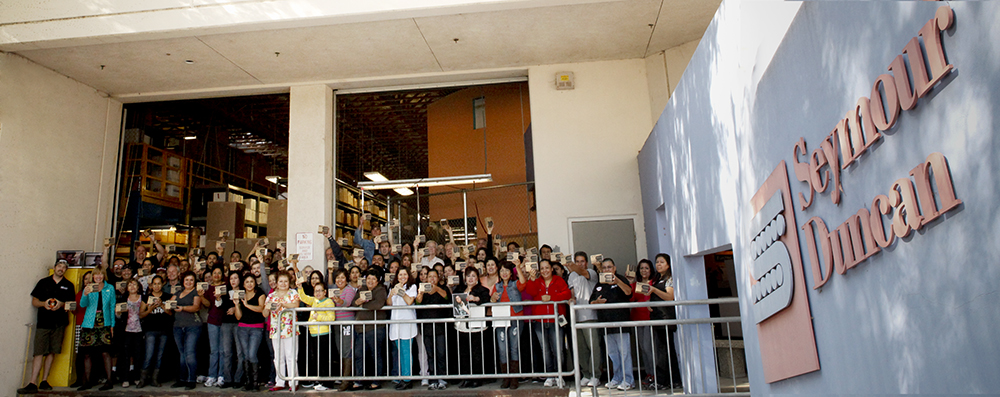
- Seymour Duncan company and employees
- Type: Private
- Industry: Pickups and effects pedals
- Founded: 1976; 50 years ago
- Founder: Seymour W. Duncan and Cathy Carter Duncan
- Headquarters: Goleta, California, U.S.
- Products: pickups effects pedals
- Number of employees: 120
- Website: seymourduncan.com

Seymour Duncan is an American company best known for manufacturing guitar and bass pickups. They also manufacture effects pedals which are designed and assembled in United States. Guitarist and luthier Seymour W. Duncan and Cathy Carter Duncan founded the company in 1976, in Santa Barbara, California.

== History ==
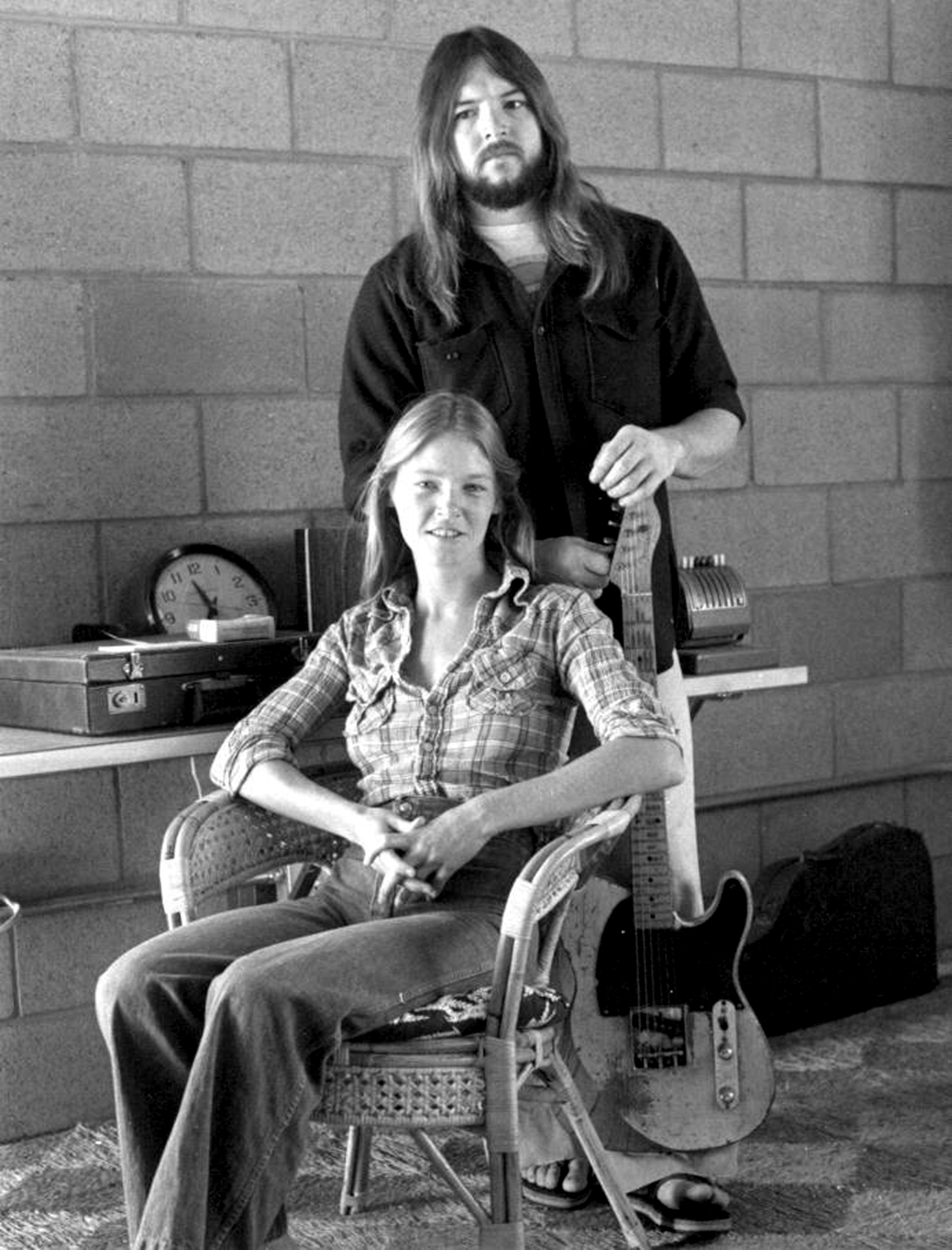
Seymour Duncan and Cathy Carter Duncan in the 1970s

Seymour W. Duncan became interested in guitars at a young age. After lending his guitar to a friend who accidentally broke the pickup, Duncan decided to re-wind the pickup using a record player turntable to hold the pickup in place and rotate it while spooling wire around the pickup bobbin. Seymour was then inspired by how the guitar's tone improved, inspiring him to learn more about pickups from Les Paul - guitarist/inventor - and later mentor, Seth Lover: inventor of the humbucker. After developing considerable skill working on guitars, Duncan gained employment at London's Fender Soundhouse.

After moving to California he met and married Cathy Carter and decided to start a pickup rewinding service. With demand for his services growing, Duncan and Carter started offering custom Stratocaster, Telecaster, and humbucking pickups. Within two decades they were manufacturing an assortment of electric, bass, and acoustic guitar pickups; as well as electric guitar accessories. In 2012, Seymour Duncan was inducted into the Vintage Guitar Hall of Fame for contributions to the music industry.

From the 1980s until 2013, Seymour Duncan made bass pickups under the Basslines brand name, before rebranding them under Seymour Duncan; without redesigning the pickups.

Seymour continues to create pickups in Seymour Duncan's Santa Barbara factory in California.

== Notable users ==
The first artist signature pickup was the SH-12 Screamin' Demon model, created for George Lynch (Dokken, Lynch Mob). Another well-known Seymour Duncan artist, "Dimebag" Darrell Abbott, collaborated on a signature pickup, the SH-13 Dimebucker. The pickup has been used on Abbott's tribute guitars produced by Washburn Guitars and Dean Guitars, but not on Abbott's own guitars. Seymour Duncan pickups were also popularized in Japan by notable rock bands. Dino Cazares of Divine Heresy and formerly of Fear Factory worked with Seymour Duncan to produce the Blackouts line of active pickups, which come in different sizes to fit various pickup routes in seven string guitars.

Seymour Duncan's best selling pickup model is the SH-4 "JB Model" humbucker, that originated from a pickup Duncan made in the early '70s for his hero Jeff Beck who had the PAF pickups switched out of his guitar by a dishonest guitar tech. Beck used the pickups in his seminal release "Blow By Blow" in a guitar built for him by Seymour, dubbed the Tele-Gib, which featured a JB pickup in the bridge position and a "JM" or Jazz Model pickup in the neck. The JB was never an official signature pickup, and Duncan cannot use the name Jeff Beck.

Other artists known for their use of Seymour Duncan pickups include, but are not limited to:

- Kurt Cobain of Nirvana used Seymour Duncan pickups on a variety of his guitars such as Hot Rails and SH-4. His famous Fender Jaguar guitar came with a DiMarzio SD in the bridge which he bought used. Many think this guitar belonged to a jazz player who was left handed and his tech had the Jaguar modified. Kurt was convinced to not break or modify this Fender Jaguar.
- Billie Joe Armstrong of Green Day uses a Seymour Duncan JB model in his Fernandes Stratocaster copy known as "Blue".
- Mark Hoppus of +44 and blink 182 uses a Seymour Duncan SPB-3 "Quarter Pound" in his signature basses.
- Tom DeLonge of blink 182 and Angels and Airwaves used a Seymour Duncan SH-8 "Invader" in his Fender Stratocasters and later an SH-5 "Custom" in his Fender Starcasters.
- Dave Mustaine of Megadeth collaborated with Seymour Duncan to produce his very own signature set of active humbuckers, "Dave Mustaine Livewires". Mustaine also uses an almost regular JB, the SH-4 called "Thrash Factor". Seymour Duncan worked closely with Dave to recreate the tone and feel of his favorite JB, ultimately altering the winding process in order to achieve the tone he was looking for – compared to the standard JB model, the Thrash Factor’s low end is tighter, the mids are slightly scooped, and the highs are more aggressive.
- Randy Rhoads used Seymour Duncan Jazz and JB pickups on his Jackson custom (now Rhoads style) guitars.
- Linde Lazer of HIM uses a White Gibson SG with Custom Seymour Duncan pickups.
- Synyster Gates of Avenged Sevenfold uses Custom Seymour Duncan Invader pickups.
- Mick Thomson of Slipknot uses Active Seymour Duncan Blackouts (his own signature set called the AHB-3s), which he switched from the combination of EMG 81/85.
- Mikael Åkerfeldt and Fredrik Akesson of Opeth most commonly use Seymour Duncan Full Shred pickups.

== Products ==
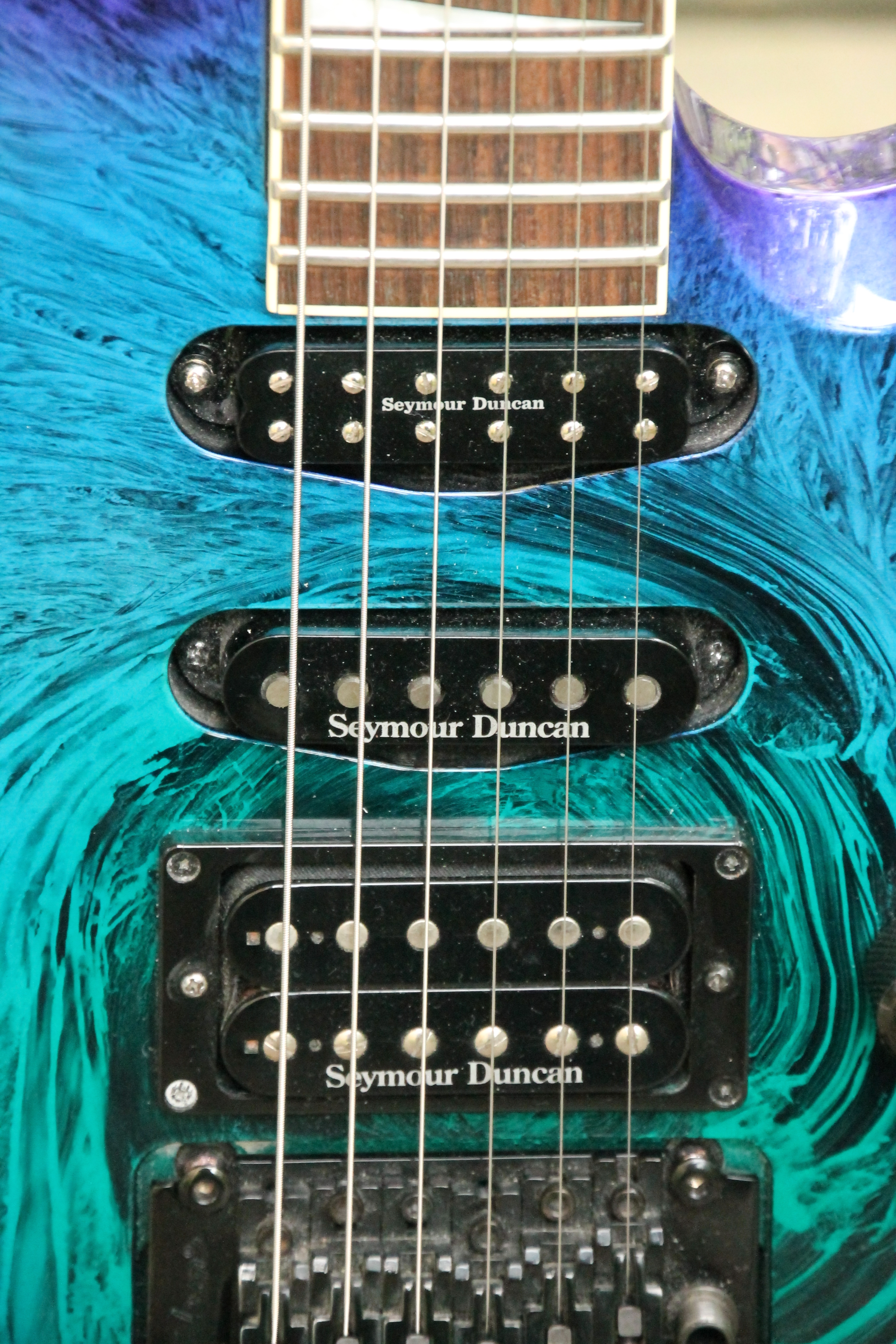
Example of Seymour Duncan pickups on an electric guitar (from bridge to neck: SH-6 Distortion, STK-S4 Classic Stack, and SL59-1 Little '59).

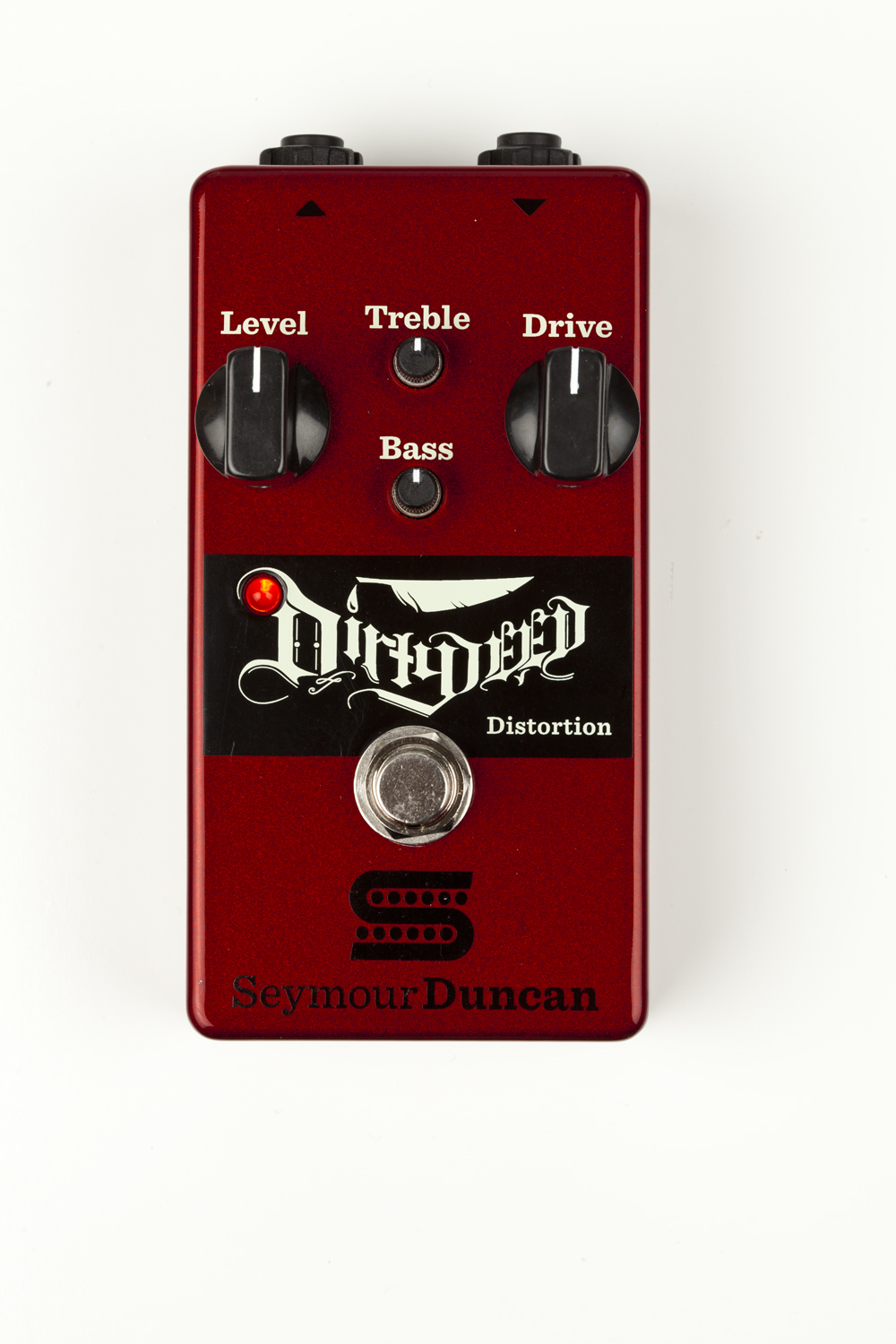
Dirty Deed distortion pedal, released in 2013

Seymour Duncan produces a large range of pickups for guitars in several formats including Humbucker, Stratocaster, Telecaster, Jaguar, Jazzmaster, P90, Filtertron, Mini Humbucker, and Acoustic; as well as effects pedals and bass pickups.

Some of their most popular guitar pickups include the '59 Model, the JB (bridge) and Jazz (neck) set, Duncan Distortion set, and the Pearly Gates set.

For almost every kind of pickup, Seymour Duncan manufactures a vintage, modern, and high output version, and an antiquity model based on the vintage version but with an aged appearance. As of 2013, the company has moved into the 7 and 8 string guitar pickup market. They also produce a line of active pickups.

Seymour Duncan also produces a line of Korean-made "Duncan Designed" pickups for OEM use on mid-level guitars and basses; $300 - $800. The Duncan Designed pickups are based on Seymour Duncan's most popular pickups and are in addition to their standard American-made product line. Duncan Designed pickups are, however, different from their Seymour Duncan roots. While Seymour Duncan sets voice the neck and bridge pickups differently to optimise tone, Duncan Designed pickups produce one pickup to be used in either the neck or bridge position. For example, The HB-102 is based on the USA-made SH-4 JB (bridge) and SH-2n Jazz Model (neck) set. Homogenising the design reduces cost, produces a slightly different tone, but does not produce a lower quality tone.

They also manufacture a range of effects pedals, including the 805™ Overdrive, the Vapor Trail™ Delay and the Dark Sun Digital Delay + Reverb, made in collaboration with Mark Holcomb of Periphery.

Seymour Duncan produced a small line of guitar amplifiers during the 1980s and 1990s. Although the effort was short-lived due to the company's lack of reputation as an amp builder, Seymour Duncan amplifiers are well respected and sought after today. At Winter NAMM 2017, Seymour Duncan announced their PowerStage family of pedal amplifiers by launching the PowerStage 170 and the PowerStage 700.
