= Gibson Flying V =

Electric guitar

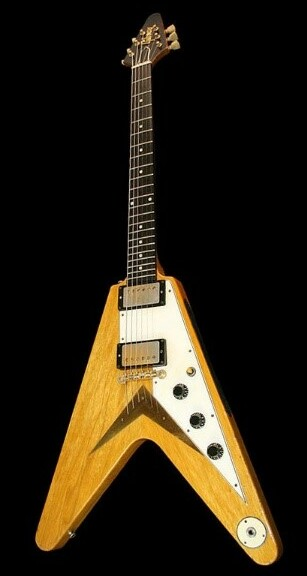
- Manufacturer: Gibson
- Period: 1958–1959, 1963, 1967–present

Construction
- Body type: Solid
- Neck joint: Set-in
- Scale: 24.75 in (629 mm)

Woods
- Body: Korina, mahogany
- Neck: Korina, mahogany
- Fretboard: Rosewood, ebony, baked maple

Hardware
- Bridge: Tune-o-matic, and "Short Lyre Vibrola" used on some models
- Pickup(s): H-H: 496R (neck), 500T (bridge)

Colors available
- "Classic White", cherry, ebony, natural

The Gibson Flying V is an electric guitar model introduced by Gibson in 1958. The Flying V offered a radical, "futuristic" body design, much like its siblings: the Explorer, which was released the same year, and the Moderne, which was designed in 1957 but not released until 1982. The initial run of guitars used a distinctive wood of the Limba tree marketed by Gibson under the trade name "korina"; later models used more conventional woods.

Perhaps too radical for its time, the initial run of Flying V guitars was not successful and fewer than 100 were manufactured and sold. Some players, such as blues guitarist Albert King and rock guitarists Lonnie Mack and Dave Davies, gravitated towards the unique design and helped popularize the model years after it had left production. After renewed popularity led to increased demand, Gibson manufactured a small number of Flying V guitars in 1963 from leftover parts from the original run, and the guitar reentered regular production in 1967 and has been reissued numerous times since then. A number of variant models, including the redesigned Flying V2 from 1979 to 1982, and an unusual Reverse Flying V from 2007 to 2008, have been released as well.

== Origins ==
Gibson president Ted McCarty pushed for a line of modernist guitars in the mid-1950s to compete with the newly designed, and highly successful, Fender Stratocaster. They manufactured prototypes of the guitars in 1957, including a mahogany version that was abandoned because it was extremely heavy. They eventually used the wood of the limba tree, which the company marketed as "korina" (a term Gibson invented). The wood is similar to, but lighter in color and weighed less than mahogany, though it presented similar tonal characteristics. This Flying V had two sister models that were developed alongside of it, and debuted at the NAMM Show that year, the Futura, and the Moderne. Based on feedback at the NAMM show, only the Flying V and the Futura, now rebranded as the Explorer, went into production, while the initial prototype of the Moderne was never seen again, though several decades later production models were produced. These designs were meant to add a more futuristic aspect to Gibson's image, but they did not sell well. After the initial launch in 1958, the line was discontinued by 1959. Manufacturing records indicate that 98 Flying V guitars were manufactured during its initial 1958–1959 run. Some instruments were assembled from leftover parts and shipped in 1963, with nickel- rather than gold-plated hardware. Due to the rarity of the initial run and the later popularity of reissued models, the 1958–59 Korina Flying V is one of the most valuable production-model guitars on the market, ranked at No. 5 on the 2011 Top 25 published by Vintage Guitar magazine, and worth between US$200,000 and US$250,000 as of 2011.

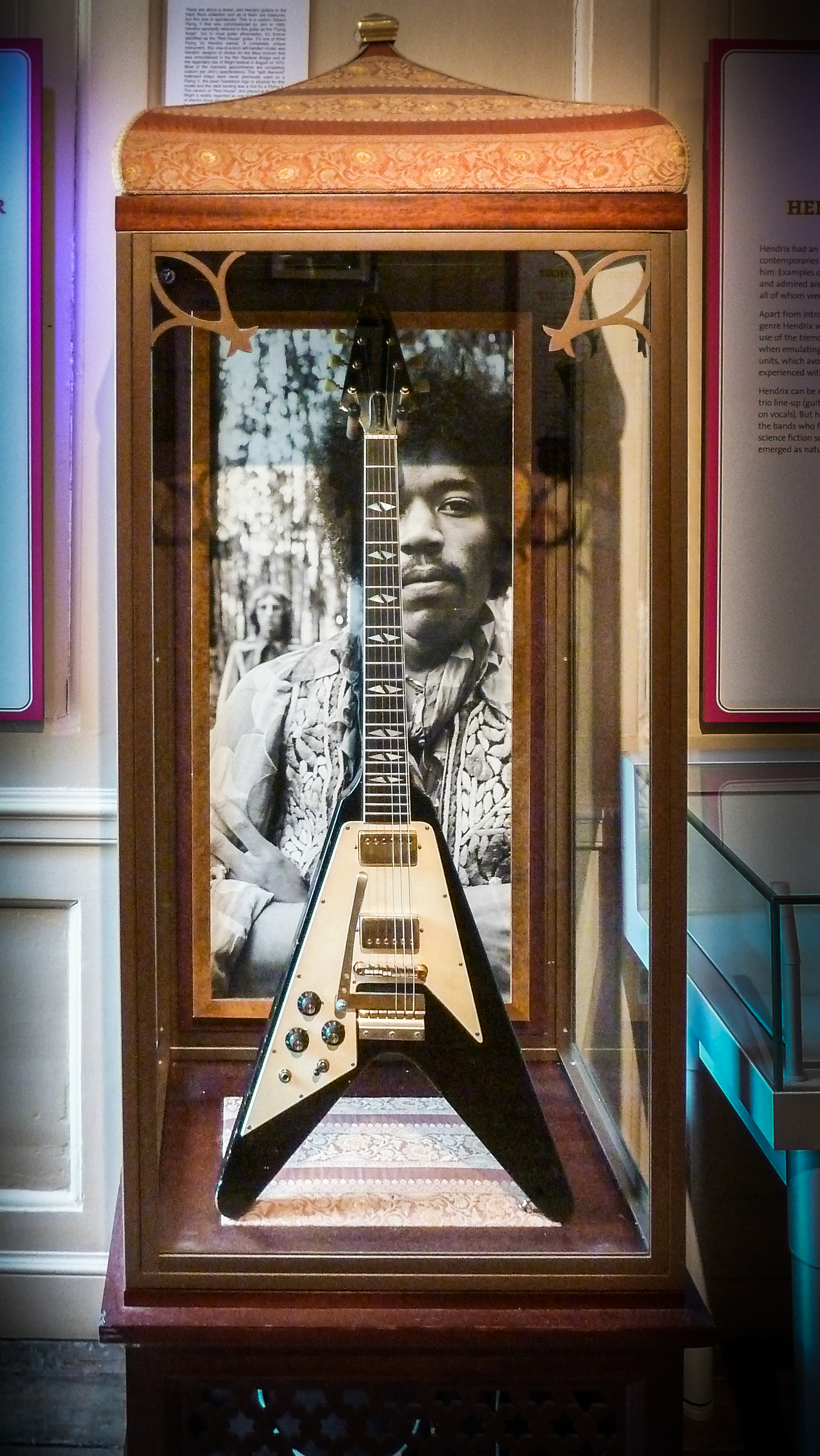
Jimi Hendrix's custom-made 1969 Flying V guitar with left-handed configuration

Famed blues guitarist Albert King and pioneering blues-rock guitar soloist Lonnie Mack started using the guitar immediately. Mack used his 1958 Flying V almost exclusively during his long career. As it was seventh off the first-year assembly line, he named it "Number 7". King used his original 1958 instrument, dubbed Lucy, into the mid-70s and later replaced it with various custom Flying Vs. Later, in the mid-late 1960s, such guitarists as Dave Davies, in search of a distinctive looking guitar with a powerful sound, also started using Flying Vs. The renewed interest created a demand for Gibson to reissue the model.

=== Reissues ===
Gibson reissued the guitar in mahogany in 1967, updating its design with a bigger pickguard, and replacing the original bridge, which had the strings inserted through the back, with a short Vibrola Maestro Tremolo. This 1967 model is now the standard for the Flying V although the earlier design is periodically reissued. Like other Gibson guitars, the Flying V's headstock is angled at 17 degrees to increase string pressure on the nut to increase the amount of sustain. The design of the V places the pickups near the center of mass of the entire guitar, further enhancing sustain. Jimi Hendrix owned a '67, '68, and finally a '69 Custom Flying V ordered by Hendrix with Native American arrowhead-shaped fret marker inlays. For 2020 Gibson produced 125 right handed recreations of Hendrix's '69 Custom Flying V and 25 left-handed copies. Marc Bolan of the band T. Rex owned a rare Walnut Flying V, of which only 35 were produced between '67 and '71. Bolan's V was part of the same run of Flying Vs as those owned by Hendrix. Billy Gibbons of ZZ Top played an early Korina V on the album Fandango!. Flying Vs later became a popular heavy metal guitar due to their aggressive appearance and were used by guitarists Paul Stanley, Rudolf Schenker, Andy Powell, Michael Schenker, K. K. Downing, James Hetfield, Kirk Hammett, and Dave Mustaine.

=== Modern models ===
Both Gibson and Epiphone currently produce a 1958-style Flying V, designed to look like the original korina models.

Although a staple in the Gibson lineup, the guitar has been discontinued on-and-off again in the 2010s, along with the Gibson Explorer. For 2015, Gibson did not have a production Flying V available so a limited run of high-performance (HP) Flying Vs were produced by the Gibson Custom Shop as "demos" for the Japanese market. These Japanese market Flying Vs were designed like the mid-70s Vs, with a neck volute and small headstock. They included a granadillo fretboard, raised profile neck, and 6 lb. slimline body. In 2016, Gibson carried over some features from the 2015 Japanese Market Pro HP demos and produced the Flying V Pro (similar to the Explorer Pro) which also featured a slightly smaller body, but traditional (T) versions had dot inlays, and HP versions had cream binding on the neck and body, and rectangular pearloid inlays. Since the 2017 models have been released, however, Gibson has changed its name to the Flying V 2016. As of 2017, Gibson USA manufactures the Flying V and differentiates model years by including the year in the name (e.g., 2017, 2018, etc.). These models have a "half" pick guard and are available in Natural, Aged Cherry, Ebony, and Alpine White, depending on the year. Some years offer T spec and HP models. Gibson Custom Shop continues to produce the Flying V Standard and Custom. For 2021, Gibson Custom Shop's Murphy Lab released a run of 81 aged '58 Korina Vs, and 19 aged '58 Korina Explorers to commemorate the number of Vs and Explorers ordered in the models first production year 1958.

== Flying V2 ==
Gibson Flying V2
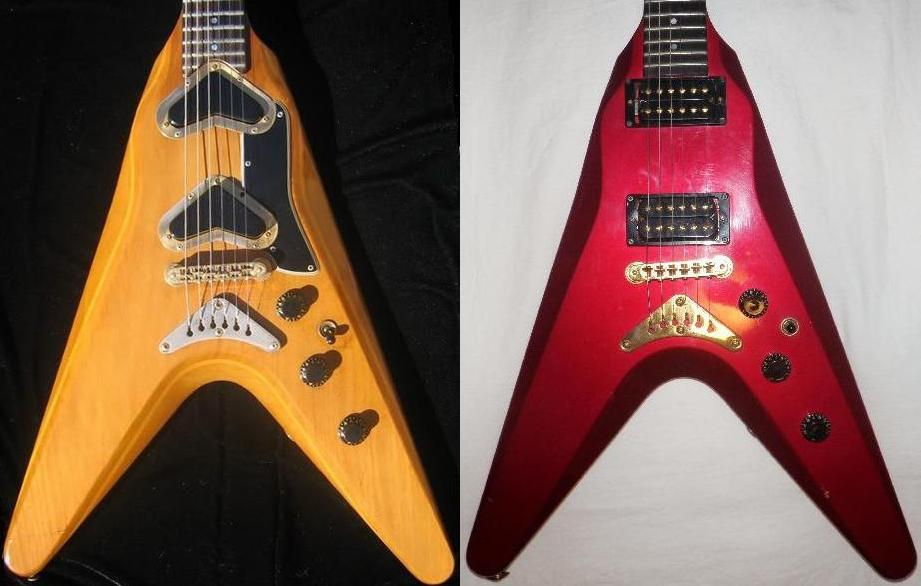
- Manufacturer: Gibson
- Period: 1979–1982

Construction
- Body type: Solid
- Neck joint: Set-in

Woods
- Body: Walnut/Maple
- Neck: Walnut/Maple, with brass nut
- Fretboard: Ebony

Hardware
- Bridge: Tune-o-matic
- Pickup(s): H-H: 1979–81 Boomerang (neck & Bridge), 1982 Dirty Fingers (neck & bridge)

Colors available
- Natural initially, then custom colors: Pearl white, Blue sparkle, Blue sparkle metallic, Candy apple Red, Goldburst, Silverburst, Sunburst, Black and Black Sparkle. Candy Apple Red and White Finishes only for 1982 Dirty Finger models.

When Tim Shaw arrived at Gibson in 1978, one of his first assignments was to help with designing a companion guitar to the newly designed E2 Explorer Guitar. This companion guitar would be the new Gibson V2. The general shape of previous Flying V's was retained by Gibson, but the new V2 sported a new 5-layered sculptured walnut and maple body. Initially, these guitars came in a natural finish to accentuate the layered effect, with either Maple or Walnut for the top and bottom layer. This layering was known at Gibson as the "Sandwich" and the sculpted body gave the layering a 3D effect. Knobs were moved off the pickguard, and a Pearl Gibson logo was inlaid into the black headstock, along with gold Gibson Tuners. Two solid brass 5/8 studs known as the "Sustain Sisters" were fitted into the body to anchor the "Tune-o-matic" Bridge along with a brass nut and brass "V" shaped tailpiece. Gibson felt this would provide the sustain and brilliance they wanted for the new V2.

The 1979 through 1981 models used the "boomerang" humbucker pickups, designed to sound like single coils with lower noise. Beginning in 1982, the pickups were changed to the "Dirty finger" pickups that were available on only a few models in the early 1980s, including the Explorer, ES-347, ES-335S and the Flying V. The V2 with case retailed for US$1,199 in 1979 (equivalent to $5,319 in 2025), Gibson's 3rd most expensive guitar. Only 157 V2's were shipped in 1979. Besides the high price, some players complained about the non-traditional sounding humbucker pickups and the weight of the guitar. Sales were poor for the first 2 years of the V2's availability, and Gibson was scrambling to find ways to increase demand for these guitars from the dealers. It became apparent by the early 1980s that the maple top version wasn't selling as well as the walnut top guitars. To move the maple-top inventory, Gibson began to offer various color finishes to supplement the initial offering of natural finishes. Custom colors included Pearl white, Blue sparkle, Blue sparkle metallic, Candy Apple Red, Sunburst, Goldburst, Silverburst, Black, and Black Sparkle. The majority of these finishes were applied to maple-top inventory between September 1980 and April 1981.

The V2 did not meet sales expectations. In 1982, several hardware changes were made to reduce the cost of producing the guitar and to use up the remaining inventory. The most important change was replacing the "boomerang" pickup and pickguard with the more conventional "Dirty Fingers" Pickup found on many E2 Explorers. The boomerang pickups were more expensive to produce and required more costly routing to the guitar body, and a "V" groove to the fretboard. Also, the standard conventional humbucker rout allowed players to swap out pickups easily. Gibson covered the laminated bodies (usually Maple top) of the second variant V2 "Dirty Finger" humbucker versions with Candy Apple Red or White finishes.

A final cost-cutting measure eliminated the inlaid Pearl Gibson headstock logo with a gold decal. Once the majority of the remaining inventory stockpile was used up, Gibson officially discontinued the V2 model in 1982. The Explorer version E2 lasted a year longer, but it too was discontinued by 1983.

== Reverse Flying V ==
Gibson Reverse Flying V
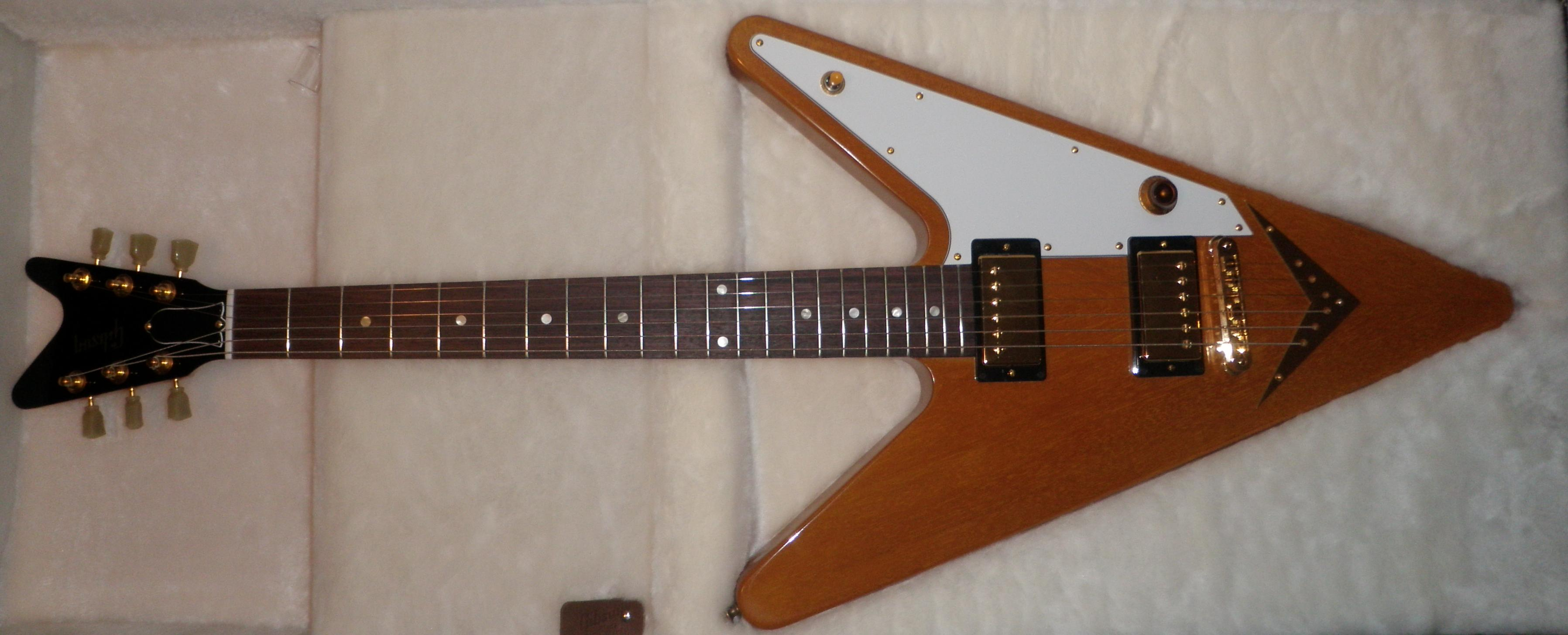
- Manufacturer: Gibson
- Period: 2007–2008

Construction
- Body type: Solid
- Neck joint: Set-in

Woods
- Body: Mahogany
- Neck: Mahogany
- Fretboard: Rosewood (2007), ebony (2008)

Hardware
- Bridge: Tune-o-matic
- Pickup(s): H-H: '57 Classic (neck), '57 Classic (bridge)

Colors available
- 1st release: Trans Amber. 2nd release: Natural. Classic White, Ebony Black

The Gibson Reverse Flying V was first released as part of Gibson's Guitar of the Week promotion in 2007. It was released as Guitar of the week (week 29) with a limited run of only 400. To achieve the "reverse" style, the body of the guitar is rotated 180 degrees relative to the original Flying V. It features a single color, a vivid Trans Amber finish with gold-plated hardware, and a string-through tailpiece. The guitar features a solid Mahogany body and neck, rosewood fretboard, a pair of hand-wound '57 Classic pickups, and a single volume knob. The headstock was borrowed from the 1958 Gibson Futura/Explorer patent dated January 7, 1958.

Several months later due to the success of the first release of the Reverse Flying V, Gibson decide to re-release the Reverse Flying V as a limited-edition guitar to commemorate the 50th anniversary of the original Flying V. The 2008 release was a limited run of 900 guitars, in three new colors, Natural, Classic White and Ebony Black. 300 of each color were produced, with Natural being very similar in appearance to the first release's Trans Amber. The specifications are practically the same between the 2007 and 2008 releases with a few notable differences. The second release (2008) now had a gold-colored metal Truss cover, and an Ebony fretboard, replacing the plastic truss-cover and Rosewood fretboard of the first release (2007).

== V Bass ==
In 1981, Gibson produced a four-string bass version of the Flying V. Only 375 were produced, most of them black but a few in alpine white, silverburst, or transparent blue. Epiphone also made V-shaped basses. In late 2011, Gibson re-released the Flying V bass under the Gibson name; it was discontinued again in late 2012.

== Notable Gibson Flying V players ==
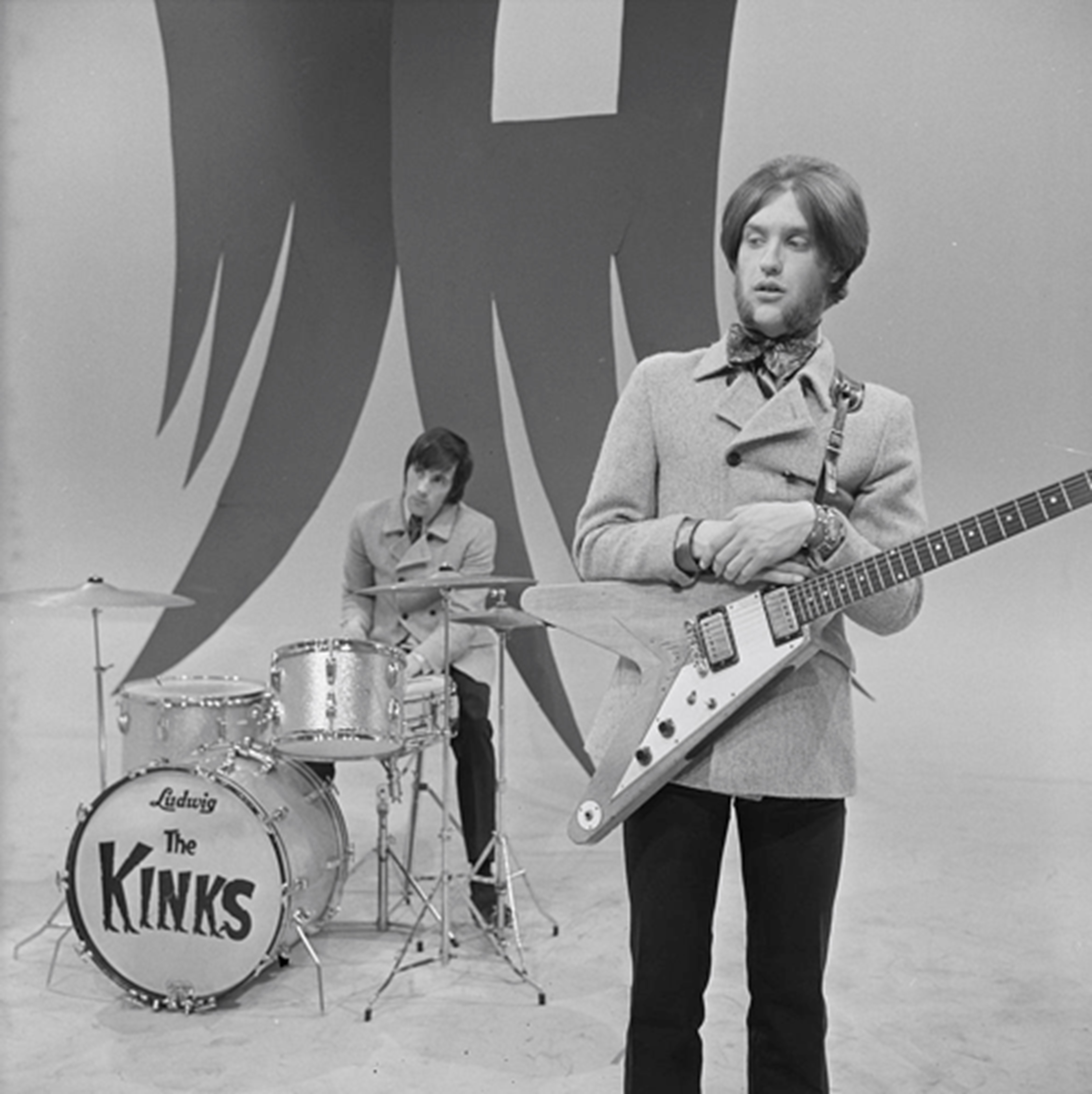
Dave Davies of the Kinks holding one of fewer than 100 Korina Flying Vs manufactured during their initial 1958–1959 run

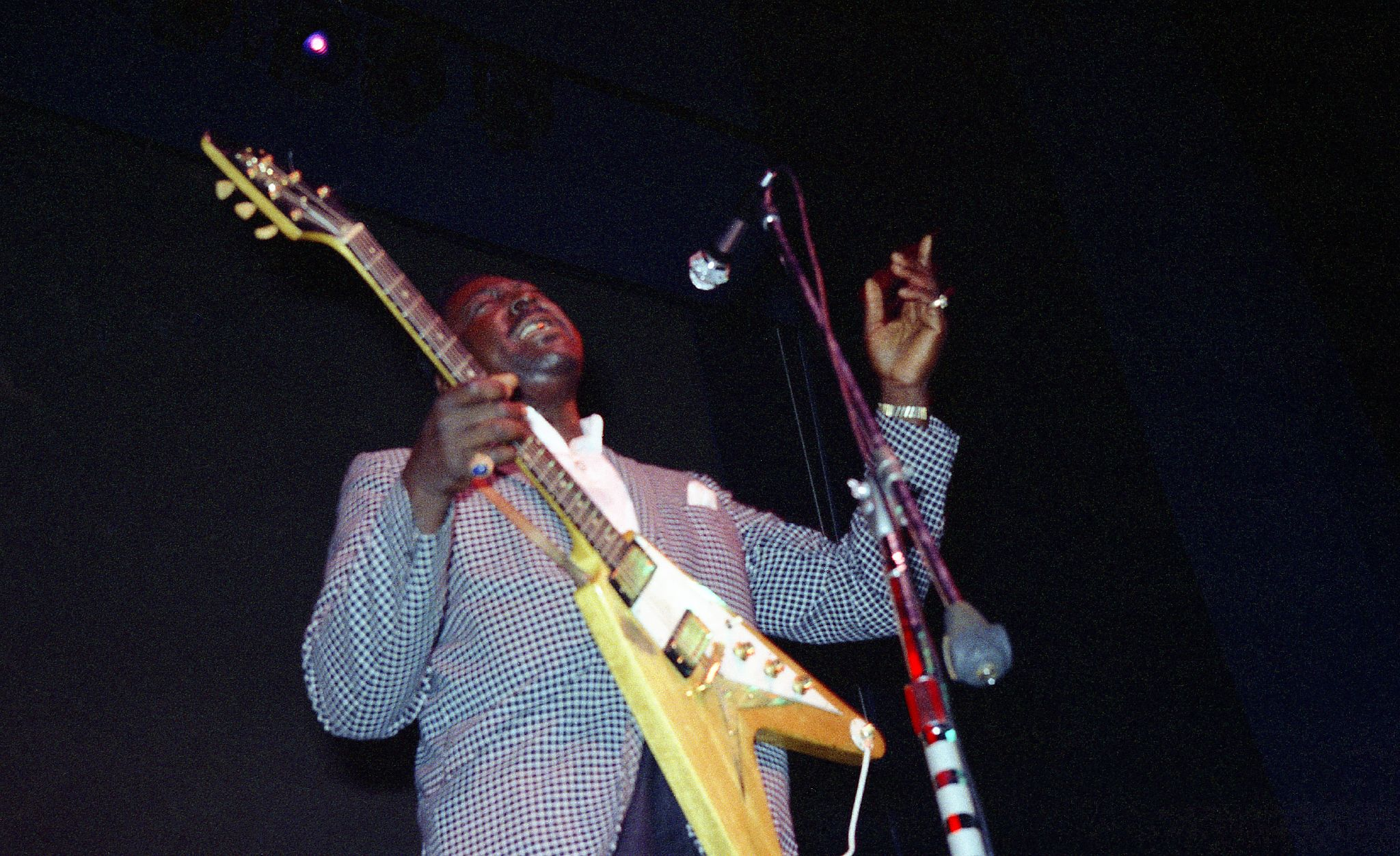
Blues guitarist Albert King here playing his original Korina Flying V in 1968

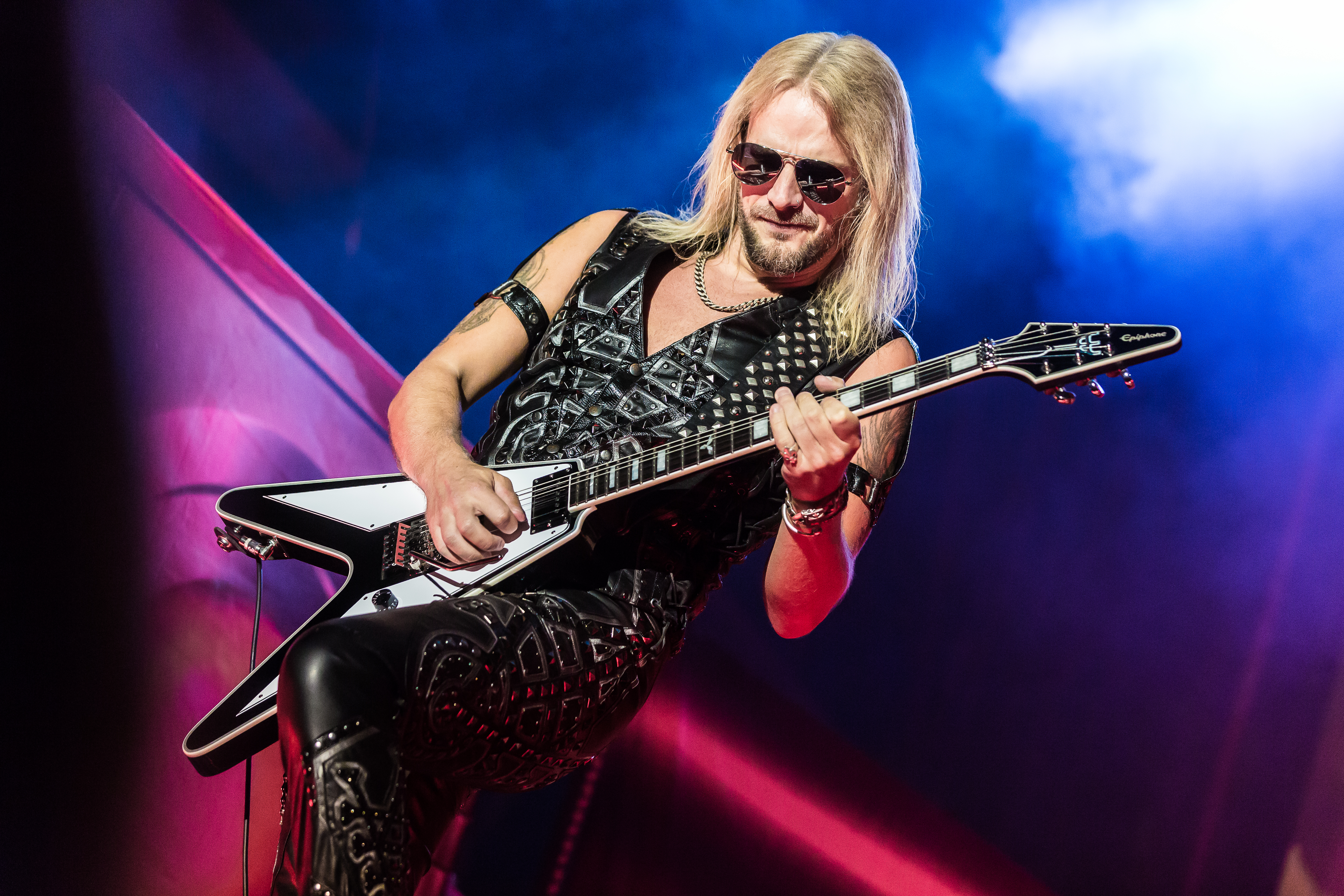
Judas Priest guitarist Richie Faulkner has his own line of custom Flying Vs manufactured by Gibson subsidiary Epiphone

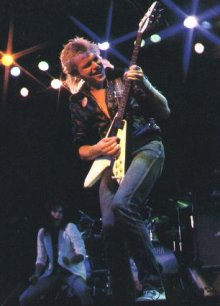
German guitarist Michael Schenker performing on his signature brilliant white Flying V in 1981

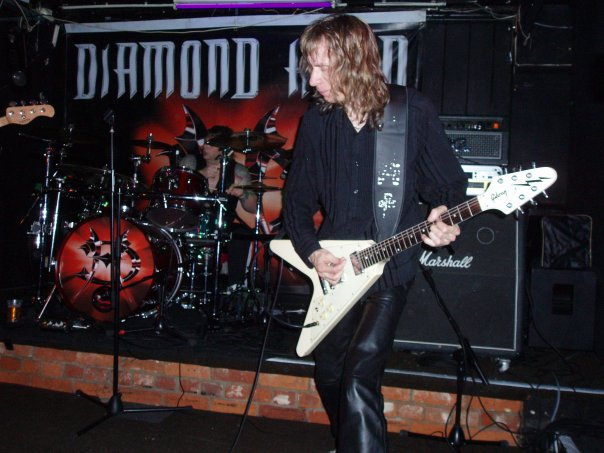
Brian Tatler of Diamond Head shown in 2008 playing an ivory Flying V

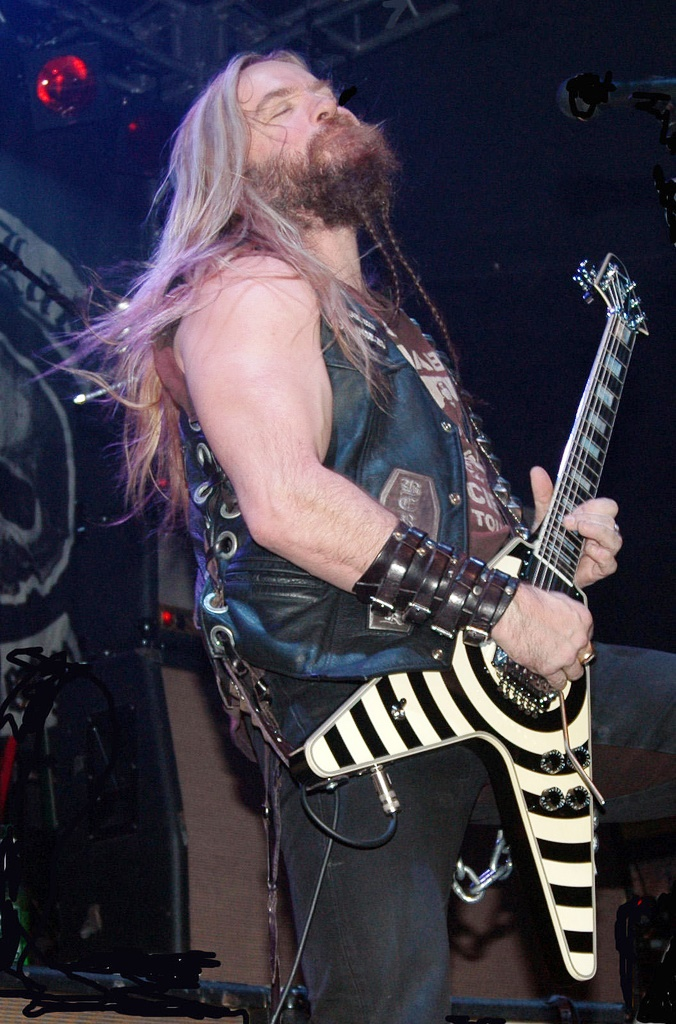
Zakk Wylde plays a Flying V with his signature bullseye paint job in 2006 with Black Label Society

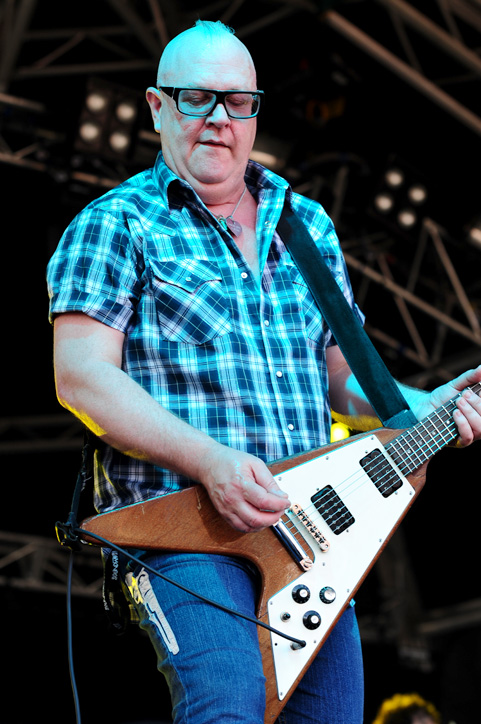
Dave Catching of Eagles of Death Metal playing a 1967 mahogany Flying V with a stop tailpiece in 2010

== In fiction ==
- A 1958 Flying V named Amos appeared in the 1984 movie This Is Spinal Tap, and it was played by actor Christopher Guest, who played character Nigel Tufnel.

== See also ==
- Dean V
- Gibson Modernistic Series
- Jackson King V
- Jackson Rhoads
- KKV guitar
