= Abel Axe =

Electric guitar

- Classification: String instrument

Related instruments
- Electric guitar, guitar, vintage guitar, bass guitar, list of guitars

The Abel Axe is an electric guitar invented by Jeff Abel from Wyoming, United States and engineered by James Jones. Made from aircraft grade T-6 Billet aluminium, its distinguishing features are the various sized holes dotting the body. All Abel Axes are made in the United States. Abel Axe has won the Emerging Manufacturer Award in the 1999 Annual Manufacturing Awards Ceremony. Mark Slaughter, leader of the band Slaughter, owned an Abel Axe.

== Design ==
The Abel Axe was anodized in numerous colors, including grass green, silver (clear), red, black, teal, blue, violet, gold, and multicolor. Scale length on necks is 25.5 inches (65 cm). The body was small and Strat-typed with a trem or fixed bridge. The body pattern was changed to slot-type from 2000 to 2001 and after 2007. The necks on the first run were manufactured by Musikraft, Inc., owned by Gulab Gidwani, from 1994 to 1996. Warmoth necks were used starting 2001, and later necks were made by Delaney Guitars since 2007. Rosewood or maple wood were used for the 22 fret necks. Some other specs are Kent Armstrong pickups, Kahler tremolo, Gotoh bridge, and Sperzel graduating, locking and tuning keys. In 2001, the holes were changed to body slots, and the body used thicker coating and brighter colors. The Abel Axe with holes and Kahler trem weighs approximately 9 pounds (4.1 kg) and measures 15.5 by 11.25 by 1 inch (39.4 cm × 28.6 cm × 2.5 cm), and the Abel Axe with holes and the fixed bridge also weighs approximately 9 pounds (4.1 kg) (instead of a routed cavity for a trem, the unmilled metal remains and keeps the weight the same as if there were a trem); the body itself weighs 5 pounds (2.3 kg).The heel flange has the thickness of about 3/16 inch (4.8 mm).
