= Kossoff Burst =

Sunburst 1959 Gibson Les Paul Standard

The Kossoff Burst is a 1959 Gibson Les Paul Standard that was played by Free guitarist Paul Kossoff from 1970-1976. The guitar was broken during a concert when Kossoff threw it in the air. In 2011 the guitar was recreated and reissued by Gibson's Custom Shop.

== History ==
Kossoff played the guitar from 1970 until his death in 1976. Kossoff played in the band Free and he broke the neck on the guitar in the 1970s when he threw it up in the air and failed to catch it during a concert. He then picked up Arthur Ramm's 1968 Gibson Les Paul Goldtop to finish the concert. He told Ramm he would like to keep the goldtop and he would give him the Les Paul that he broke during the concert after it was repaired. Kossoff repaired the guitar but did not keep his promise. After Kossoff's death the guitar was sold to Ramm by his father for 800 pounds, as this is what Koss owed his father for getting it out of hock. Thirty-nine years later, Ramm sold the guitar at an auction. The guitar was listed by Bonhams in 2015 but later removed and returned to Ramm. In 2018 the guitar was displayed at the Songbirds Guitar Museum.

== Description ==
Gibson Custom Shop - Paul Kossoff 1959 Les Paul Standard

The guitar is a 1959 Gibson Les Paul in sunburst finish and it weighs 8.68 lb (3.94 kg). Just behind the tailpiece there are a number of dents and scratches, possibly caused by strings being fed through the stop bar tailpiece. In the early 1970s the guitar's neck was broken near the fifth fret. Luthier Sam Li repaired the break. The body and neck of the guitar are Honduran mahogany and the maple top cap on the body is beautifully bookmatched maple. The bridge is an unoriginal ABR1 and the bridge pickup volume pot is unoriginal.

== Legacy ==
The guitar has been recreated and reissued by Gibson's Custom Shop. Gibson had the original guitar digitally scanned, and measured. They claim to have documented the guitar in intimate detail in order to recreate the original guitar.

== See also ==
- List of guitars
