= Jupiter Coyote =

American rock band

- Origin: Macon, Georgia
- Genres: Rock music; Rock; Bluegrass; Funk rock; Jam band
- Years active: c. 1988–present
- Labels: Autonomous Records; RoadRunner Records; MBM Records; Redeye Distribution
- Members: Matthew Mayes; Sanders Brightwell; Gene Bass; Steve Trismen; Noel Felty; John Meyer; Kevin "Ponchito" Scheyer; Robert Soto
- Past members: John Felty; Ned Grubb; Matt Trevitt; David Stevens Jr.
- Website: www.jupitercoyote.com

Jupiter Coyote is an American rock band from Macon, Georgia. Operating as an independent group from the late 1980s into the 2020s, they have sold more than one million records. Given their early history and use of electric interpretations of bluegrass themes, some Jamband historians consider them the forefathers of what is now known as “Jamgrass.”

== History ==
Band members Matthew Mayes and John Felty were childhood friends in Brevard, North Carolina, and assembled the group after completing undergraduate studies and moving to Macon, Georgia. The group was initially a cover band known as the Rockafellas and released its first album of original material as Jupiter Coyote in 1991, incorporating southern rock, bluegrass, funk, and country into their sound and touring the jam band circuit. The group refers to its music as "mountain rock" and features the guijo, a guitar-banjo hybrid invented by Matthew Mayes. Two members left the group and were replaced in 1991. The group's own label, Autonomous, released albums such as Wade (1994), Lucky Day (1995), and Here Be Dragons (1998). Autonomous had a distribution deal with Roadrunner Records and helped launch the careers of Strangefolk and Sister Hazel. With Steve Trismen's addition in 1999 the group added fiddle to its sound, and in the 2000s they expanded to a septet when guitarist John Meyer and drummer Noel Felty came on board.

The group remained active as a touring ensemble in the 2010s and 2020s in addition to recording. Performances included repeated concerts at the Windjammer in Isle of Palms, South Carolina, a 2018 show at the Songbirds Guitar Museum in Chattanooga, and a 2021 headlining performance at the Oakland Cemetery in Atlanta.

== Members ==
Current

- Matthew Mayes - guitar, guijo, vocals
- John Meyer - guitar
- Gene Bass - drums (1992-2000, ?-present)
- Noel Felty - drums (2000–present)
- Sanders Brightwell - bass (1992–present)
- Steve Trismen - fiddle, vocals (1999–present)
- Kevin "Ponchito" Scheyer - percussion
- Robert Soto - percussion

Former

- John Felty - vocals, guitar
- Ned Grubb (c. 1988-1992)
- Matt Trevitt (c. 1988-1992)
- David Stevens, Jr. - percussion (1993-1997)

== Discography ==
- Cemeteries and Junkyards (Stolen Records, 1991)
- Wade (Autonomous Records, 1993)
- Lucky Day (Autonomous/Roadrunner, 1995)
- Ghost Dance (Autonomous, 1997)
- Here Be Dragons (Autonomous/Roadrunner, 1998)
- Live (Coyote Recordings, 2000)
- Waxing Moon (Coyote Recordings, 2001)
- The Hillary Step (Coyote Recordings, 2004)
- Sage with Toad (MBM Records, 2011)
- Life Got in the Way (Self-released, 2018)
- The Interplanetary Yard Dog (Self-released, 2020)
