= Nano guitar =

10 µm carved guitar

The nano guitar is a microscopically small carved guitar. It was developed by Dustin W. Carr in 1997, under the direction of Professor Harold G. Craighead, in the Cornell Nanofabrication Facility. The idea came about as a fun way to illustrate nanotechnology, and captured popular attention. It is disputed as to whether the nano guitar should be classified as a guitar, but it is the common opinion that it is in fact a guitar.

== Explanation ==
Nanotechnology miniaturizes normal objects, in this case, a guitar. It can be used to create tiny cameras, scales, and covert listening devices. An example of this is smartdust, which can be either a camera or a listening device smaller than a grain of sand. A nanometer is one-billionth of a meter. For comparison, a human hair is about 200,000 nanometers thick. The nano guitar is about as long as one-twentieth of the diameter of a human hair, 10 micrometers or 10,000 nanometers long. Each of the six 'strings' is 50 nanometers wide. The entire guitar is the size of an average red blood cell. The guitar is carved from a grain of crystalline silicon by scanning a laser over a film called a 'resist'. This technique is known as electron-beam lithography.

The guitar strings can be made to vibrate by tiny lasers using an atomic force microscope, in the same way, a guitar player might use a plectrum. The strings vibrate at around 40 000 000 Hz, roughly 15 octaves higher than a normal guitar, which can typically reach up to 1318.510 Hz. Even if its sound were amplified, it could not be detected by the human ear.

== Implications ==
The nano guitar illustrates inaudible technology that is not meant for musical entertainment. The application of frequencies generated by nano-objects is called sonification. Such objects can represent numerical data and provide support for information processing activities of many different kinds that produce synthetic non-verbal sounds. Since the manufacture of the nano-guitar, researchers in the lab headed by Dr. Craighead have built even tinier devices. One thought is that they may be useful as tiny scales to measure tinier particles, such as bacteria, which may aid in diagnosis.

== See also ==
- List of guitars
