= Amos (guitar) =

1958 Gibson Flying V guitar

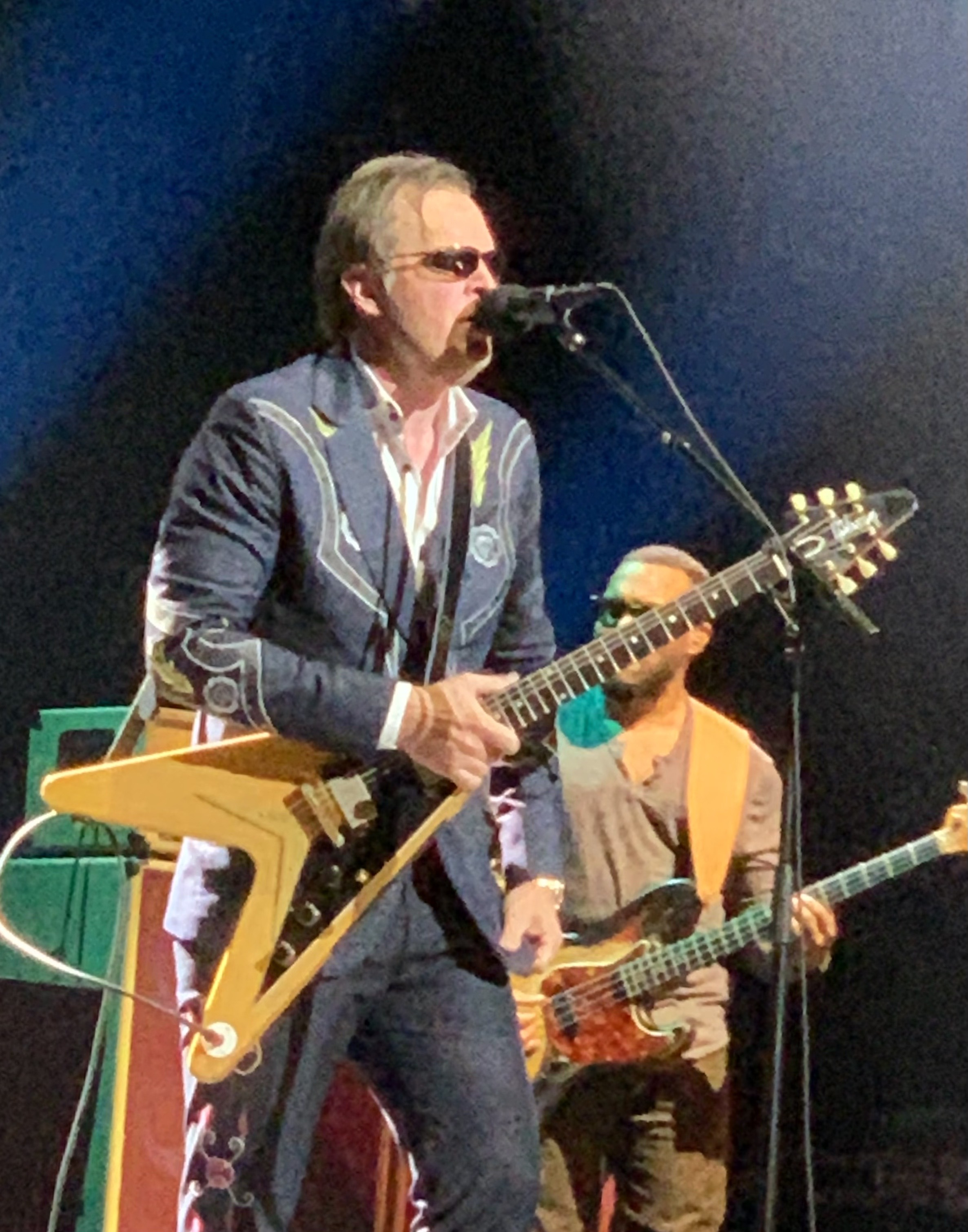
Joe Bonamassa with Amos at the Riverside Theater (Milwaukee) February 18, 2023

Amos is a 1958 Gibson Flying V guitar. The guitar was one of only 98 Flying Vs manufactured by Gibson Brands between 1958 and 1959. In 1958 it was shipped to an Indiana music store. In 1975 the guitar resurfaced in the collection of a Tarzana, California guitar seller named Norman Harris. The guitar appeared in the 1984 movie This Is Spinal Tap. It is now in American musician Joe Bonamassa's guitar collection.

== History ==
The guitar was manufactured in 1958 and it was owned by Amos Arthur, who founded Arthur's Music Store in Indianapolis, Indiana. Even though the Flying V was labeled ugly, Arthur ordered one. He thought the unique guitar would be a good conversation piece. The serial number of the guitar which became known as Amos is 8-2857.

In 1959 the guitar was sold by Arthur's Music Store and it was not seen again until 1975. The guitar was purchased c. 1975 by Norman Harris of Norman's Rare Guitars in Tarzana California. Harris said the guitar was brought into his store by a collector and he obtained it through a trade. Harris stored the guitar in his collection for four decades and in 2014 he sold the guitar to musician Joe Bonamassa.

== Description ==
In 1958 Amos was one of only 98 Flying V guitars documented to have shipped from Gibson's Kalamazoo factory. Amos is one of only ten Flying Vs to have been shipped with a black pickguard. The guitar has mismatched plastic, with a black pickguard and a white poker chip around the switch. It is believed that only five Flying Vs left the factory with that configuration.

The Flying V was only produced by Gibson for two years: in 1958 (81 shipped) and 1959 (17 shipped). The guitar is made from korina wood and has two humbucking PAF pickups.

== Legacy ==
Amos appeared in the 1984 movie This Is Spinal Tap in the collection of fictional guitarist Nigel Tufnel. The guitar also appears on page 196 of the Norman Harris book Norman's Rare Guitars: 30 Years of Buying Selling & Collecting. In 2017, Epiphone designed a limited edition copy of Amos; the same year, Seymour Duncan released a set of limited-edition Amos guitar pickups. In 2024, Gibson released an extremely limited edition Collector’s Choice clone of Amos that was scanned for exact measurements and aged by the Murphy Lab.

Joe Bonamassa continues to play the guitar in concerts.

In 2023, The Official Vintage Guitar Price Guide listed the value of a 1958–59 Flying V at US$335,000 to US$435,000.

== See also ==
- List of guitars
