= Eden of Coronet =

2015 white-gold diamond-studded guitar

Eden of Coronet

The Eden of Coronet is a customized Gibson SG guitar, made with 18-karat white gold and studded with 11,441 diamonds. Commissioned in 2015, it was described by Guinness World Records as the world's "most valuable guitar" at the time, valued at US$2 million.

== Background ==
The Eden of Coronet was commissioned by the Hong Kong–based Aaron Shum Jewelry for its brand Coronet, in cooperation with Gibson. The design was laid on top of a Gibson SG model. Gibson collaborated with jewelry designer Aaron Shum and musician Mark Lui to create the guitar, with diamonds provided by the Hong Kong firm Chow Tai Fook. The guitar is playable.

The guitar was originally presented and displayed at the Marina Mall in Abu Dhabi for the 2015 Baselworld Watch and Jewellery Show, and was later displayed in China. It returned to Abu Dhabi in October 2019 and was again displayed at Baselworld.

The Eden of Coronet was valued at US$2 million in 2015, at that time making it the most expensive guitar in the world. The record has since been broken several times.

== Design ==
The body of the guitar is covered in white gold and studded with diamonds arranged in shapes of flowers and other nature-oriented details. The guitar was named Eden because of its nature-inspired motifs.

It is studded with 11,441 diamonds (401.15 carats) and adorned with 1.635 kilograms (57.67 oz) of gold, taking 68 artisans 700 man-days to create. It features chrome hardware, including two Humbucker pickups with chrome covers. The guitar's tone controls are hidden beneath a layer of diamonds.

== See also ==
- List of guitars
