= Evo (guitar) =

Guitar belonging to Steve Vai

Ibanez JEM7VWH 'Evo'
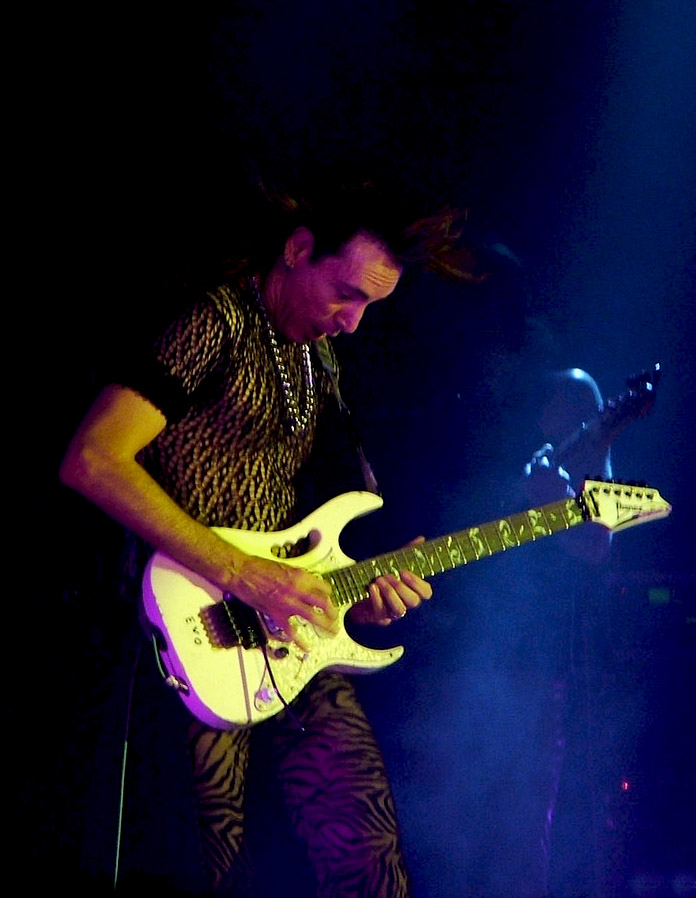
- Vai on stage with 'Evo' In Milan, 2005
- Manufacturer: Ibanez
- Period: 1987

Construction
- Body type: JEM, Superstrat
- Neck joint: Bolt-on

Woods
- Body: Alder
- Neck: Maple
- Fretboard: Rosewood

Hardware
- Bridge: Ibanez Edge
- Pickup(s): H-S-H

Colors available
- White

Evo is the name that Steve Vai has given to his primary stage and recording guitar, an Ibanez JEM7VWH. It was co designed by Vai and guitar manufacturer Ibanez in 1987. 'Evo' still retains identical specifications to the production model, with several aesthetic modifications.

== History ==
The Ibanez JEM line is considered Vai's signature guitar line. Around 1993 he recalls that he wanted to design a "Jem that had a classic look to it," and out of this came the JEM7VWH. Vai was sent four production models when they came out and started playing them all in an effort to decide which one to use on a longer-term basis. According to Vai, "guitars are like snowflakes in that it seems like there are no two that are exactly alike," so it was important to him to select one which fit his playing best. Around the same time Dimarzio also sent him several pickup prototypes, of which one design was selected and dubbed "Evolution". Vai then named his favourite of the guitars "Evo" (after the pickups installed in it) so that he could easily distinguish between his aesthetically identical guitars. Vai has played Evo since before the recording of Sex & Religion in 1993.

== Features ==
Evo is largely identical to a stock JEM7VWH, sporting an Ibanez Edge tremolo, 24-fret neck, and Dimarzio Evolution pickups. The tremolo cavity is stuffed with paper to reduce spring noise therefrom. The guitar is currently on its third neck, the first having been broken in Australia on tour and the second being replaced for a more recent tour.

The body of the guitar had a substantial crack running through it that affected tuning, but this has since been fixed circa 2005, according to Vai's guitar technician.

The guitar has been signed on the back by Les Paul twice. The first time was in 1995 at Paul's birthday party, but since it wore out he re-signed it in 1998. Upon the second signing the signature was covered in plastic, but it has still faded.

== Use ==
Vai has used the guitar on a large number of his studio albums. It also has become his main guitar when playing live. Evo is usually used in conjunction with its sister guitar, Flo. Flo is a JEM 77FP modified with an AANJ (Ibanez' "all access neck joint") made to look like a JEM 7V, with a Fernandes Sustainer attached.

Due to the guitar's extended service to Vai, coupled with his aggressive playing style, Evo currently suffers various fallibilities, both aesthetic and structural. Some of these are irreparable, and consequently Vai has resorted to playing Flo more than Evo, to extend its stage life. He also owns several backup guitars for use on tour.

== See also ==
- List of guitars
