= List of guitars =

This list of guitars details individual guitars which have become famous because of their use by famous musicians; their seminal status; their high value; and the like.

== Guitars ==
=== 0–9 ===
- The 0001 Strat – This Fender Stratocaster electric guitar was owned by David Gilmour. The model was used as a spare and for slide guitar in subsequent years. In 2019, the 0001 Strat was sold at auction for $1,815,000, setting a new world auction record for a Stratocaster. This guitar was one of the most notable in his collection as it has the 0001 serial number, although Seymour W. Duncan claims that he assembled this guitar from two others.
- 34346 – Fiesta Red Stratocaster 1959 – Purchased by Cliff Richard in 1959 for his guitarist Hank Marvin. This guitar was used on The Shadows hit "Apache". Currently in possession of Bruce Welch (rhythm guitarist of The Shadows).
- 58957 – 1935 Martin D-28 – Purchased in 1959 by Clarence White and used for many years. Several years after his death it was sought out and purchased by Tony Rice who has used it for his entire career.

=== A ===
- Arm The Homeless, a heavily modified electric guitar hybridized from several different makes and models used by Tom Morello, best known for his time as the guitarist of Rage Against the Machine. Morello first received the guitar as a custom order in 1986, however would continue to replace parts until 1990 by which point the only original part remaining was the Stratocaster body. Arm The Homeless has since become an iconic feature of Morello's career, named after the message carved onto the front of the body alongside four cartoon hippos Morello had doodled onto it and a small hammer and sickle sticker, while the back side has variously been seen featuring similar slogans such as "Fuck Trump" or "Pro-Choice".
- Amos is a 1958 Gibson Flying V.

=== B ===
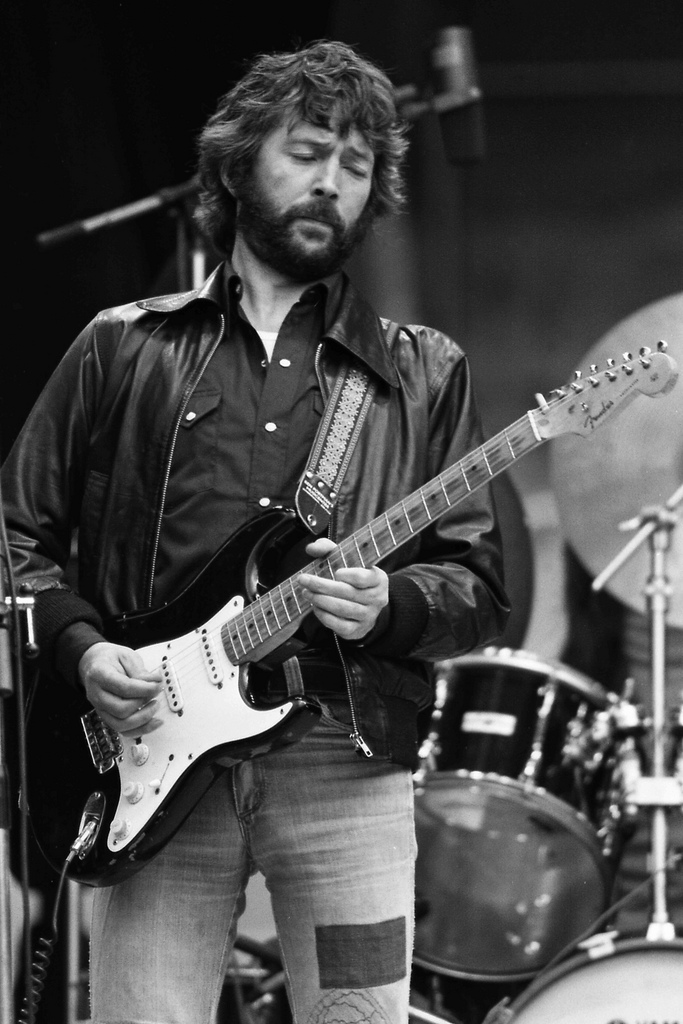
Eric Clapton performing in 1978 with Blackie

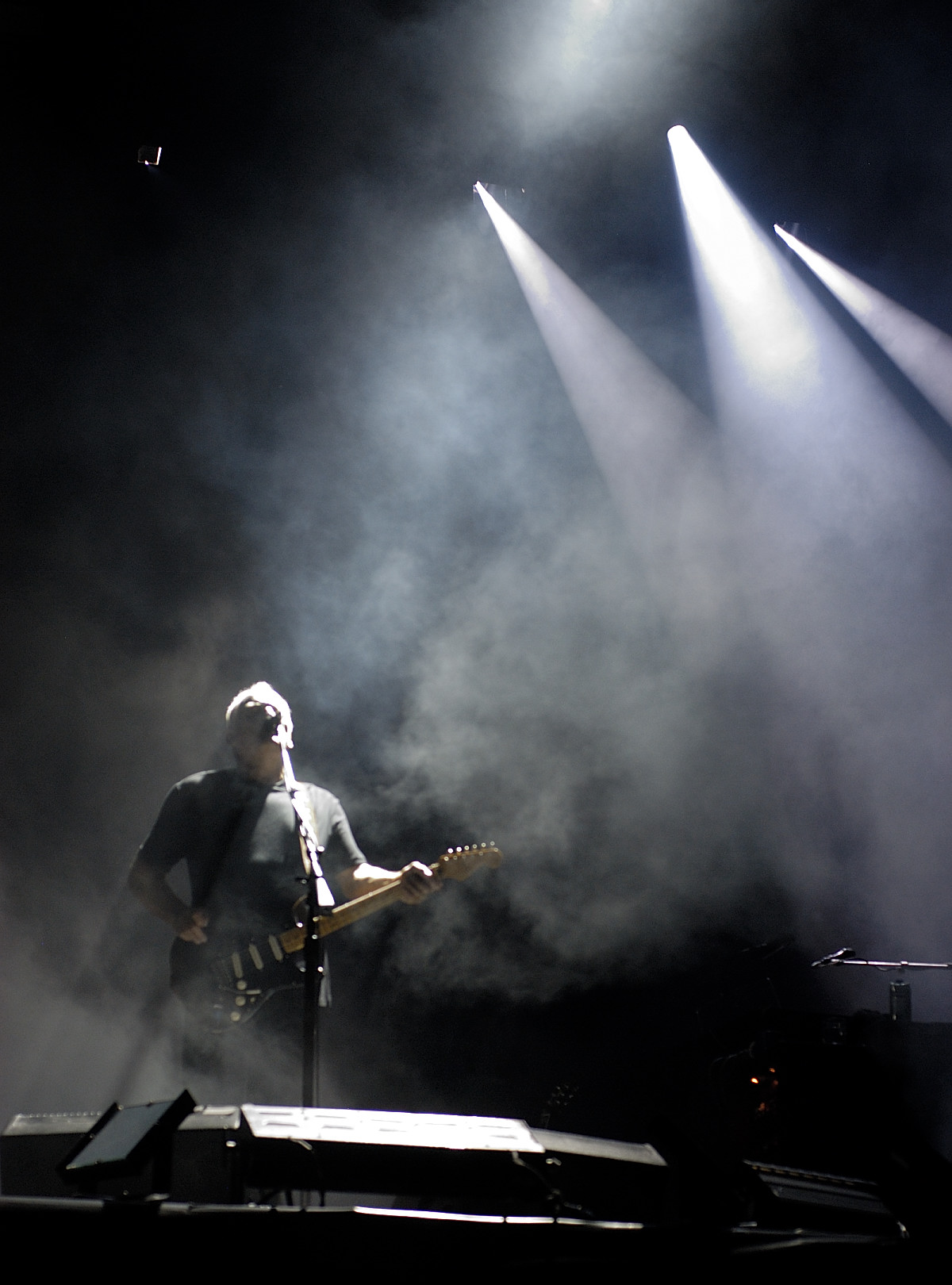
David Gilmour playing The Black Strat in 2006

- The "Baby Snakes" SG, used by Frank Zappa which had been made by a fan in Phoenix, had several distinctive features such as an extra fret and seahorse inlays. Zappa had it customized further by his luthier, Rex Bogue, who added phase switches and a pre-amp. It was then Zappa's main choice of guitar during the late 1970s.
- The Bass of Doom – a Fender Jazz Bass used by Jaco Pastorius. Robert Trujillo currently owns the instrument.
- The Beast – A '59 Gibson Les Paul, owned by Bernie Marsden of the band Whitesnake, so named because its volume is so much louder than other guitars.
- Black Beauty – Jimi Hendrix's main guitar in his final days. 1968 Fender Stratocaster, serial number #222625. Body is in black finish, with white pickguard and a maple neck. Kept in possession with Monika Dannemann, Hendrix's last girlfriend, well over two decades. Commonly believed to be passed onto Uli Jon Roth after Dannemann's death in 1996. However, its current whereabouts are unknown since Roth went through bankruptcy in 2005. "Black Beauty" also refers to many other guitars and guitar models such as Gibson Les Paul Custom.
- The Black Dog – Joe Satriani's heavily modified Ibanez Radius guitar. Originally came with HSS pickup layout but middle cavity is filled to employ HH configuration. Also with a replaced neck, Ibanez Edge tremolo unit. Refinished in black and painted with white sharpie all over. His Ibanez signature JS Series is based on this guitar. 88 copies of tribute guitar, JSBDG, was released in 2008.
- The Black Strat – the nickname for a black Fender Stratocaster guitar played by David Gilmour of the progressive rock band Pink Floyd. In 2026, it sold for $14.5 million, the highest price ever paid for a guitar.
- Blackie – the nickname given by Eric Clapton to his favorite Fender Stratocaster. In 2004, Blackie was sold for USD $959,500 at a Christie's auction to support the Crossroads Centre, a drug and alcohol addiction rehabilitation centre founded by Clapton.
- Brownie – the name for a Fender Stratocaster that was used extensively by Eric Clapton during the early 1970s. It is currently owned by the Museum of Pop Culture.
- Blue – Blue Fernandes Stratocaster used by Billie Joe Armstrong of Green Day. It's covered with stickers.
- Beano Burst – A sunburst Gibson Les Paul Standard played by Eric Clapton during his time with John Mayall and the Bluesbreakers and early Cream days. Thought to be a late 1959 or 1960 model. The name stems from the photograph of the John Mayall and the Bluesbreakers album cover, on which Clapton is a reading a Beano magazine. The guitar was stolen. Clapton stated in an interview he never found another guitar like it and he still misses it.

=== C ===
- Chrome Boy, an iconic and then-unique mirror-finished Ibanez JS2CH prototype guitar was Joe Satriani's primary touring instrument for a number of years during the 1990s until the guitar was stolen in 2002. It has not been recovered.
- Clarence, a two-tone Fender Telecaster, once owned by Clarence White. This is the original B-Bender guitar, built by White and Gene Parsons around 1967, designed to allow the guitarist to manually raise the guitar's 'B' string one whole step to play pedal steel style licks. Marty Stuart bought this unique guitar in 1980 from White's widow.
- The Cloud – the name given to Prince's custom guitar built by Dave Rusan in 1983. An asymmetric, cloud-shaped body with two controls (a push-pull master tone and a master volume), a long curved arm roughly parallel to the neck, and a unique head. This was one of three guitars that Prince used frequently through the majority of his career, and the one most iconically associated with him. The original Cloud ("Cloud 1") was donated to the Smithsonian Institution and forms part of the collection of the National Museum of American History; a later version ("Cloud 3") was sold at auction in May 2024 with a hammer price of US$ 910,000.
- The Concorde – the name given to Randy Rhoads' custom guitar built by Grover Jackson. An asymmetric V-shaped body with pointy "wings", revamp of the Gibson Flying V. This prototype evolved into Jackson Randy Rhoads model and led to the creation of the Jackson Guitars brand. It is currently in the Cleveland Rock and Roll Hall of Fame.

=== D ===
- The Dean from Hell – A Dean ML model guitar that Dimebag Darrell, from Pantera, used multiple times during live and for recordings. He got this guitar from a guitar contest in Dallas back in 1982. On the upper left side of the body there's a sticker of all the Kiss members.
- Duck – the name given to Yngwie Malmsteen's 1971 cream colored Fender Stratocaster guitar. It is known as the Duck owing to a Donald Duck sticker pasted onto the headstock of the instrument.
- The Dragon Telecaster – A 1959 Telecaster used by both Jeff Beck and Jimmy Page in both The Yardbirds and Led Zeppelin, named for its unique green, yellow and red paint applied by Page in 1967. It would be the guitar to record the famous solo on "Stairway To Heaven".

=== E ===
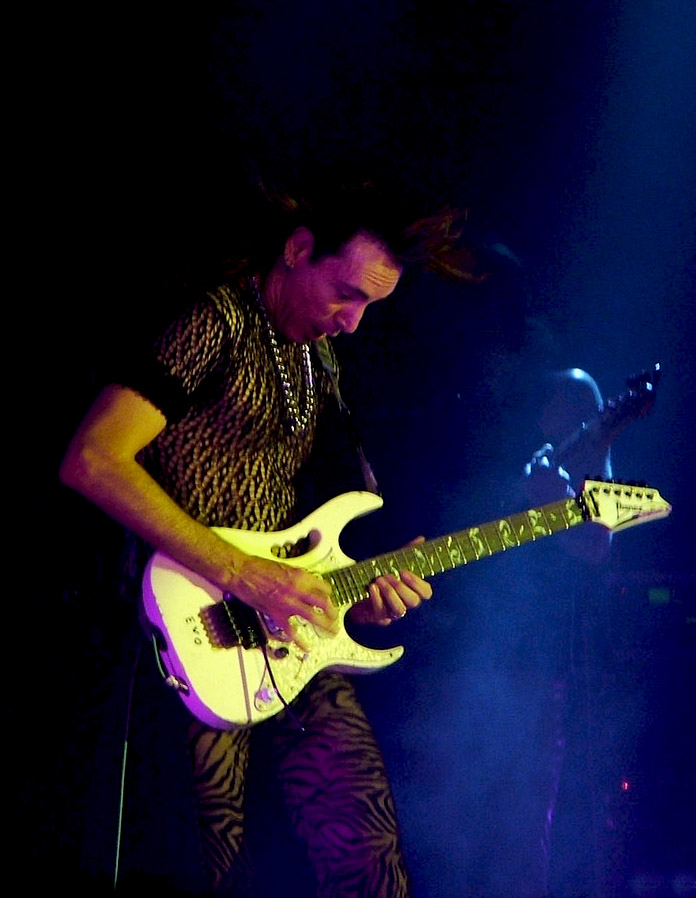
Steve Vai playing Evo

- Eden of Coronet (guitar) a Gibson SG guitar with 11,441 diamonds (400 carats) and 1.6 kilograms of white gold.
- Epiphone Supernova – A customised electric guitar featuring a distinctive union flag design given to Noel Gallagher of the English rock band Oasis as a present by his now ex-wife, Meg Matthews. A tribute to the original was manufactured by Epiphone. The original guitar is now on display at the British Music Experience in Liverpool.
- Evo – the name that Steve Vai has given to his primary stage and recording guitar, an Ibanez JEM7VWH. It was co designed by Vai and guitar manufacturer Ibanez in 1987.
- Eye of Horus – a custom bass guitar made by Jens Ritter for Phil Lesh, it was acquired by the National Museum of American History in 2011 and is in the museum's permanent collection.
- "Eet Fuk" – James Hetfield's ESP guitars MX-220, used extensively on the "Damaged Justice Tour" for the 4th studio album "...And Justice For All", James has since retired this guitar from stage use; however, it is still used for recording, as it was seen in the making of "Death Magnetic" and "Hardwired... To Self Destruct".

=== F ===
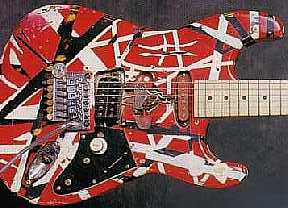
Eddie Van Halen's Frankenstrat, pictured with a 22 fret Kramer neck

- Fenderbird – the neck of a Fender Precision Bass combined with the body of a Gibson Thunderbird. Used by The Who's John Entwistle in the early 1970s.
- The Flying Microtonal Banana – a custom guitar handcrafted by Zac Eccles in 2015 for Stu Mackenzie of King Gizzard and the Lizard Wizard. Its construction notably includes additional frets, tuned to the 24-TET microtonal tuning system used throughout King Gizzard's 2017 album of the same name, Flying Microtonal Banana. Additional notes on construction include a birdseye-maple neck, rosewood fretboard, satin banana-yellow finish, and GFS NYII pickups for the bridge and neck.
- The Fool – a 1964 Gibson SG guitar, painted for Eric Clapton by the Dutch design collective The Fool. One of the world's best-known guitars, it symbolizes the psychedelic era. It was then owned and played through the 1970s by the singer-songwriter-producer Todd Rundgren. The Fool was purchased by The Jim Irsay Collection in 2023 and sold in 2026 for just over $3 million.
- Frankenstein – a Fender Precision bass guitar built by John Entwistle of The Who, assembled from components of five different basses. This was his primary stage bass from 1967–1970, and was used on the Tommy, Live at Leeds, and Who's Next albums.
- Frankenstrat – also known as The Frankenstein, is an electric guitar created by Eddie Van Halen using the body of a Stratocaster made by Boogie Bodies with components from other guitars. The name is based on Frankenstein's monster, a fictional creature made from parts of different corpses. A replica of the guitar is housed in the Museum of American History, Smithsonian Institution, in Washington D.C.
- The Funk Machine – a 1962 sunburst Fender Precision Bass that was James Jamerson's main instrument used on the vast majority of Motown’s seminal songs, and is said to have produced more hits than any bass in the history of the recording industry. The instrument is a completely stock production model with a double-cutaway alder body, three-tone sunburst finish, tortoiseshell pickguard, and chrome hardware and pickup covers. The one modification Jamerson made was to carve the word “funk” into the neck heel, which he colored in with blue pen ink. The instrument was stolen, either in the days before his death in 1983, or in the early 1970s, and it still remains missing to this day.

=== G ===
- The Gish Guitar – Billy Corgan's yellow Stratocaster from the early years of the Smashing Pumpkins. It was stolen in 1992 from a gig at Saint Andrew's Hall, Detroit, and rediscovered 27 years later in 2019.
- The Grail – Zakk Wylde's 1981 cream Les Paul Custom with black bullseye paint. It was once lost in Texas when it fell from the back of a transport truck, but brought back to Wylde later.
- Going Electric – Bob Dylan switched from an acoustic to electric guitar sound in 1965, causing controversy. At the Newport Folk Festival, he used a sunburst Stratocaster which sold for $965,000 in 2013. For the following world tour, he used Robbie Robertson's Telecaster which sold for $490,000 in 2018.
- Green Meanie – Steve Vai's self-modified Charvel superstrat. This was Vai's main guitar when he was a member of the David Lee Roth band in 1986 and 1987. The guitar has a maple fingerboard, a basswood body painted in Day-Glo green, three pickups, a 5-way switch and a Floyd Rose locking tremolo. The guitar's bridge post mounting collapsed during a soundcheck for a Madison Square Garden show and the guitar has since been retired. Many features of this guitar are replicated on the 1987 Ibanez JEM777 model, Vai's first signature guitar.
- Greeny – A 1959 Les Paul previously owned by Peter Green and Gary Moore, and purchased in 2014 by Kirk Hammett for $2 million. Has one of the pick-ups magnetically out-of-phase, giving it its unique tone.

=== H ===
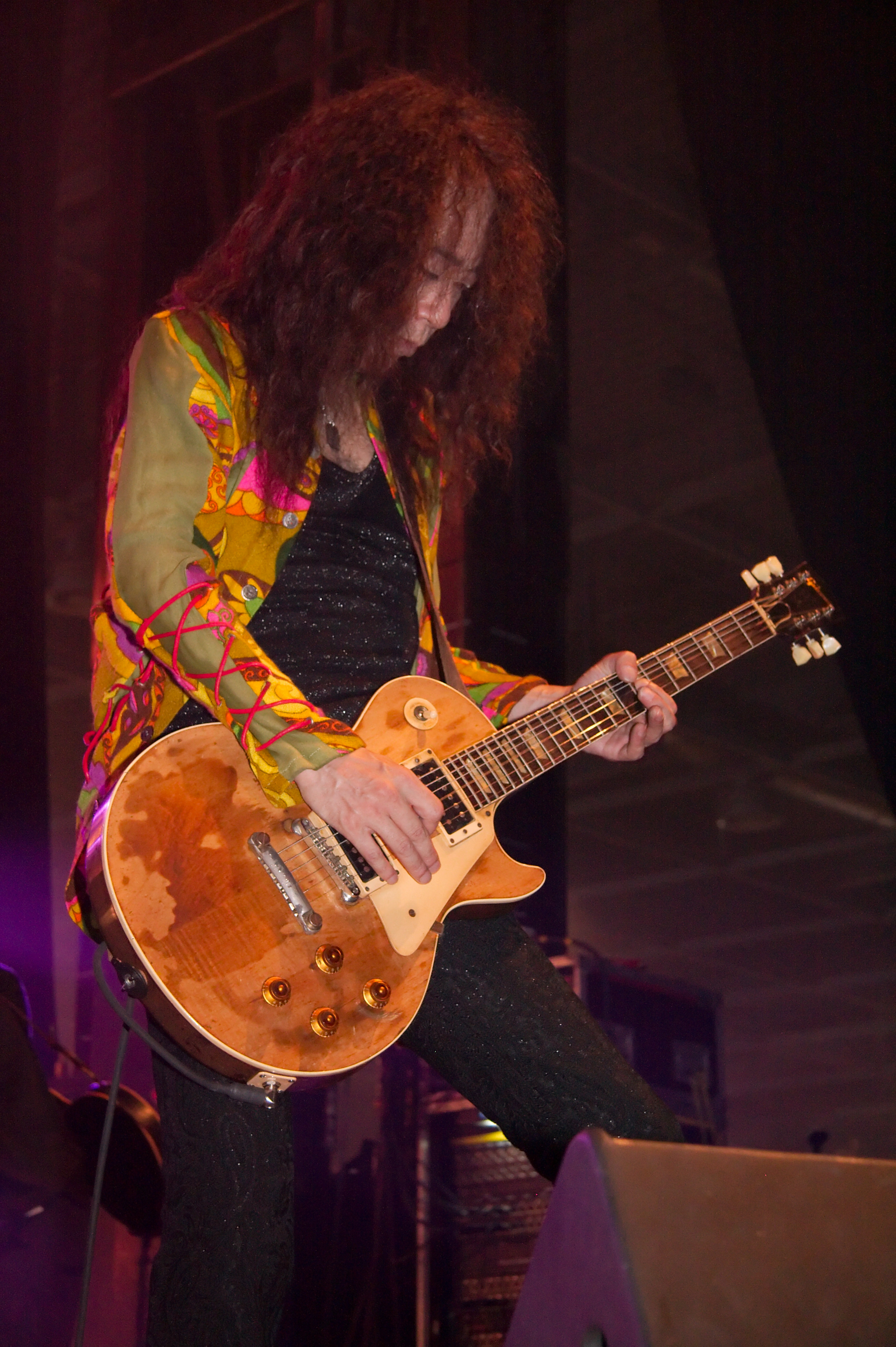
Pata playing "Hage" in 2009

- Hage (Japanese: ハゲ; lit. "Bald") – Pata's 1955 Gibson Les Paul Standard. Its Goldtop paint is rubbed down to the wood, giving the guitar its nickname. Its pickups and tailpiece were already altered when he acquired it, the former having been swapped out for humbuckers.
- The Hitmaker – Nile Rodgers' white 1960 Fender Stratocaster with a 1959 neck.

=== I ===
- Ichi-Gō (Japanese: 1号; lit. "Number 1") – Pata's yellow 1959 Gibson Les Paul Standard, also called his "Honsai" (本妻; "legal wife"). Although he still uses it for recording, it has been retired from live performances since 2008 due to its value, which is reportedly enough to buy a house.

=== K ===
- Kossoff Burst a 1959 Sunburst Les Paul Standard in sunburst finish. Played by Paul Kossoff from 1970 until his death in 1976. Kossoff played in the band Free.

=== L ===
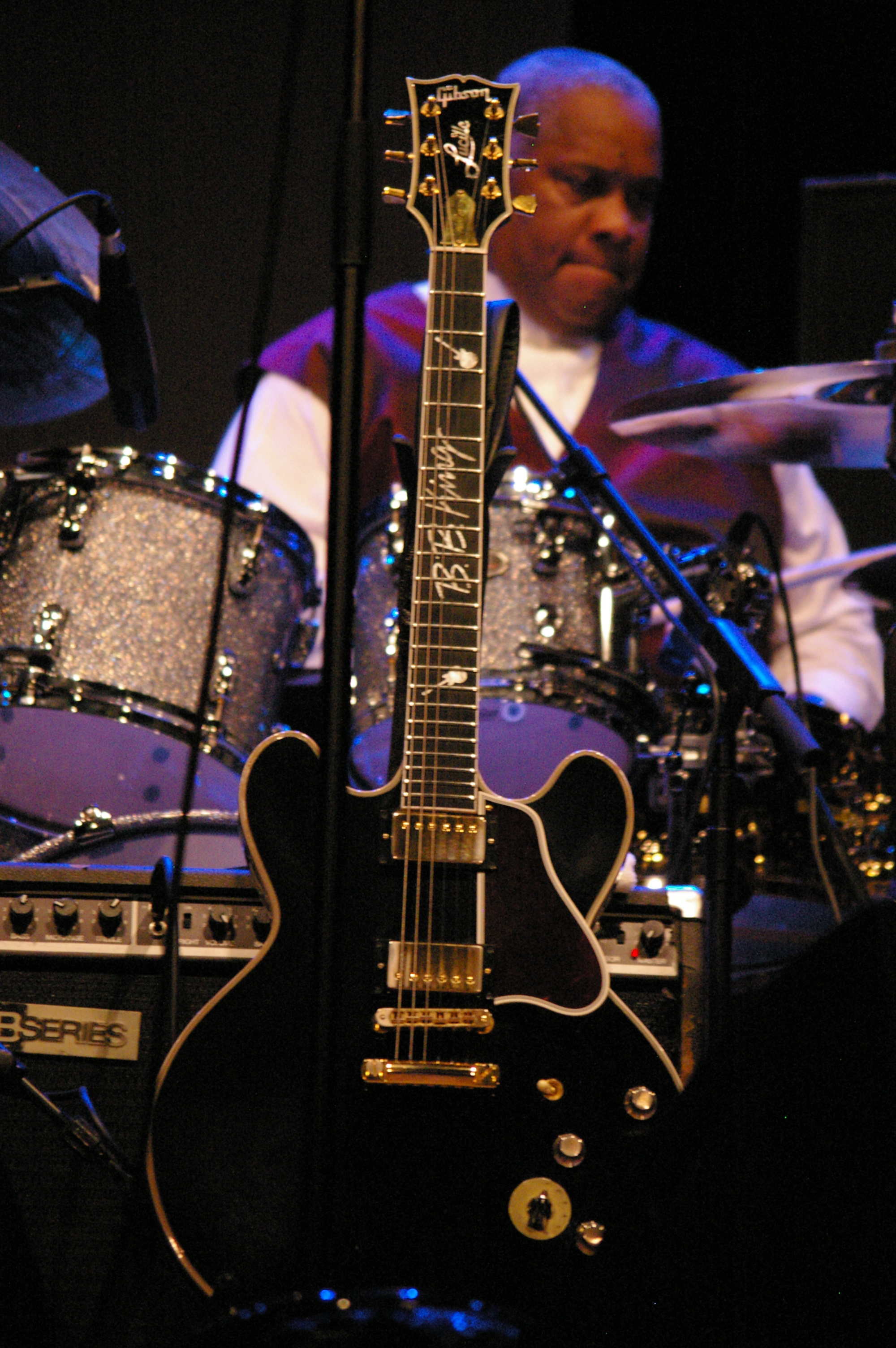
One of B.B. King's Lucille guitars

- Lenny – the Fender Stratocaster given to Stevie Ray Vaughan by his wife Lenny in 1980. It has since sold for US$623,500.
- Lightning Bolt – a custom guitar made by Steve Cripe for Jerry Garcia in 1993. It is on display at the Rock and Roll Hall of Fame in Cleveland, Ohio.
- Lucille – the name given to B.B. King's guitars. They are usually black Gibson guitars similar to the ES-355.
- Lucy – George Harrison of the Beatles named a red Gibson Les Paul guitar he received from Eric Clapton in August 1968 "Lucy." Clapton played the guitar on "While My Guitar Gently Weeps".
- Lucy – blues guitarist Albert King gave this name to his Gibson Flying V style guitar built custom for him by famous luthier Dan Erlewine.

=== M ===
- The Maple Leaf Forever Guitars – A pair of guitars, one acoustic and one electric, made and named in tribute to Alexander Muir and his patriotic Canadian 1867 song "The Maple Leaf Forever". The guitars are constructed from the same maple tree that originally inspired Muir to write the song after it was felled in a thunderstorm in 2013, and are lent by a trust to a different Canadian musician every year.
- Micawber – A 1953 Fender Telecaster owned by Keith Richards that is played in Open G tuning with the sixth string removed. The modification include a Gibson PAF humbucker pickup in the neck position that is mounted backwards, a brass bridge made by Schaller, an early lap-steel pickup in the bridge position as well as custom wiring. Micawber is still touring with Richards; "Start Me Up", "Honky Tonk Women", "Jumpin' Jack Flash". The name is from a character in Charles Dickens' novel David Copperfield.
- Model One – the main stage guitar of Lindsey Buckingham of Fleetwood Mac made by Rick Turner of Turner Guitars. Buckingham preferred it over his Stratocaster and Les Paul after seeing it for the first time and played it for three hours, as Turner said in an interview.
- Monterey Strat – A 1965 Fiesta red Stratocaster famously burned and smashed by Jimi Hendrix at the Monterey Pop Festival. A corner of it is currently on display in Seattle at Experience Music Project (EMP).
- Mosrite – White Ventures II – Used by Johnny Ramone. Bought in 1977 to replace a stolen blue Mosrite. Owned until The Ramones disbanded in 1996 – later sold to producer Daniel Rey.

=== N ===
- Nano guitar – Dustin W. Carr, under the direction of Professor Harold G. Craighead, created the nano guitar in the Cornell Nanofabrication Facility in 1997. The idea came about as a fun way to illustrate nanotechnology, and it did capture popular attention. It is disputed as to whether the nano guitar should be classified as a guitar, but it is the common opinion that it is in fact a guitar.
- Nancy – Roy Buchanan's Butterscotch 1953 Fender Telecaster, Serial number 2324.
- Number One – Stevie Ray Vaughan’s Fender Stratocaster with a 1963 body, 1959 pickups, and a 1962 neck. Vaughan bought the guitar at Ray Hennig's Heart of Texas Music store in 1974.

=== O ===
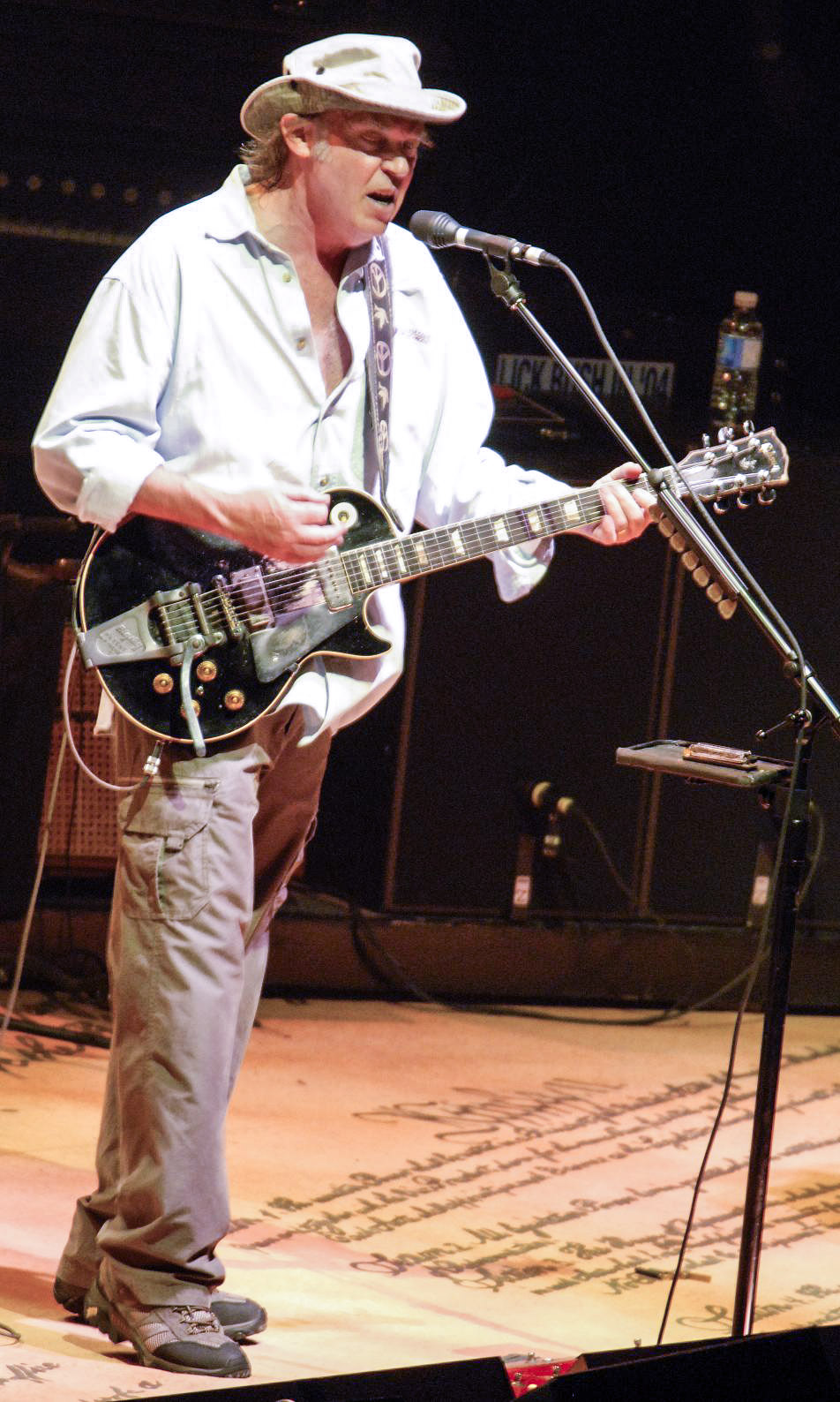
Neil Young playing Old Black on the CSNY "Freedom Of Speech Tour '06"

- Old Black – the name given to the main Gibson Les Paul electric guitar used by rock musician Neil Young.
- The Old Boy – a left-handed SG-lookalike that was built by John Diggins ("Jaydee") and that served as Tony Iommi's main guitar for many years. It has since been retired and remains in Iommi's possession.

=== P ===
- Pansy - Frank Iero's Antique White Epiphone Elitist Les Paul Custom, featuring individual holographic pattern stickers beneath the bridge spelling 'PANSY'. The guitar was destroyed during an MTV performance where he stuck it through a sign, resulting in a massive split in the neck. Pansy has since had the truss rod replaced and remains in Iero's private collection.
- Pearly Gates – Billy Gibbons' signature 1959 Gibson Les Paul. Traded a rolling wreck auto named Pearly Gates for money to buy the guitar, which assumed the name.
- Pepto Pink – also referred to as Big Pink, this is Bob Weir's pink custom Modulus guitar. It was given to Weir by Bob Dylan in 1987 after conclusion of the Bob Dylan and the Grateful Dead 1987 Tour. The guitar has been played by Bob Weir at Grateful Dead, The Other Ones, Ratdog and Further concerts.
- The Phenix [sic] – a black Les Paul Custom given to Peter Frampton by Mark Mariana, used on the Humble Pie live album Performance Rockin' the Fillmore and throughout his early solo career. This guitar was thought lost in the crash of a cargo plane but eventually returned to him.

=== R ===
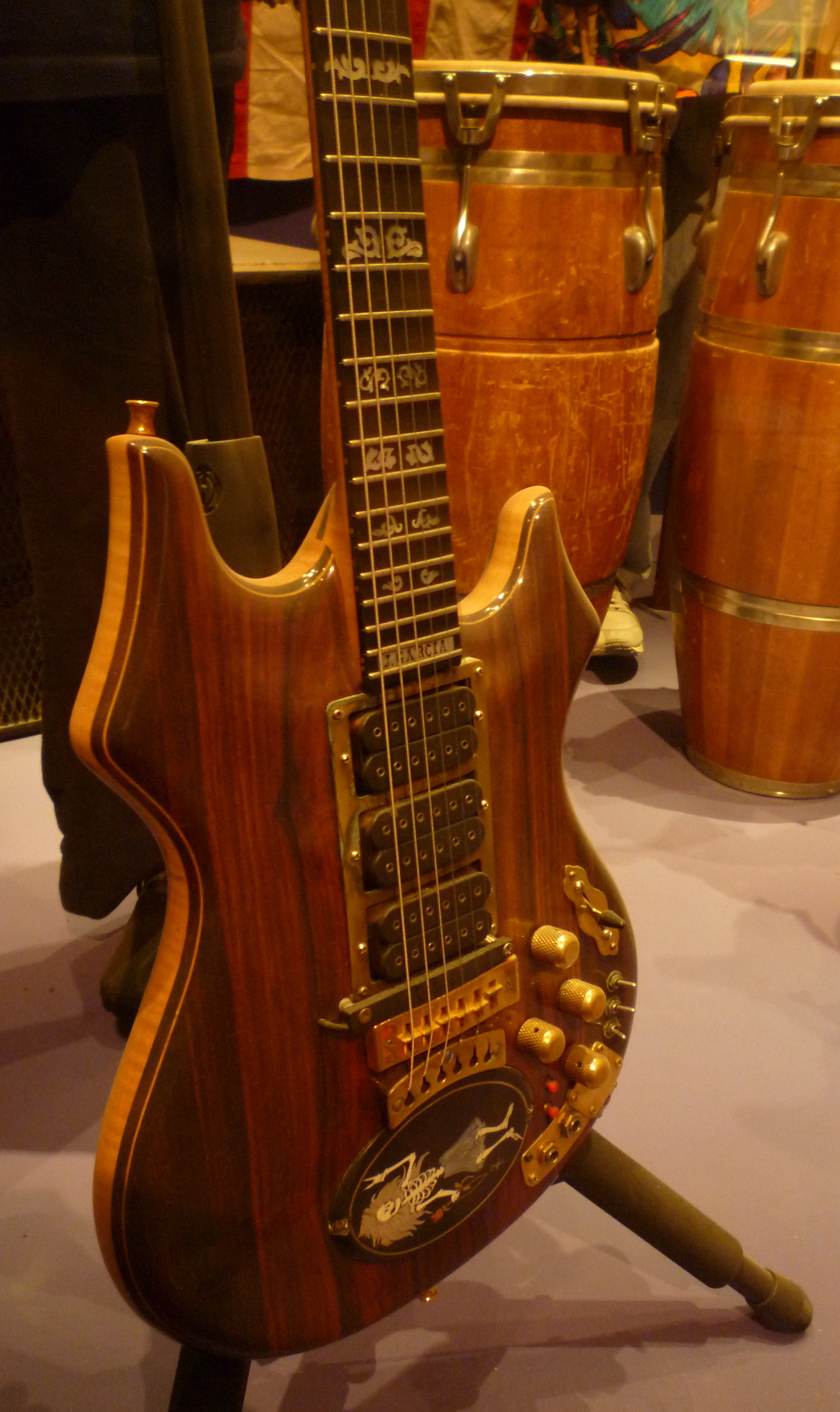
Jerry Garcia's Rosebud guitar

- Red Special – an electric guitar owned by Queen guitarist Brian May and custom-built by him and his father Harold over a two-year period beginning in 1963. The Red Special is also sometimes named in reviews as the Fireplace or the Old Lady, both nicknames used by May when referring to the guitar.
- The Rickenbastard - a Rickenbacker 4001 electric bass guitar owned by Lemmy Kilmister, nicknamed after his controversial lifestyle.
- Rocky - name given to George Harrison's blue Fender Stratocaster. The guitarist painted with bright DayGlo paint, nail polish and glitter in a psychedelic style. The name "Rocky" is prominently displayed on the head stock. The guitar first appeared on the "All You Need Is Love" TV taping and also displayed in the jacket booklet of Magical Mystery Tour album.
- Rosebud – Jerry Garcia's fourth custom guitar made by the luthier Doug Irwin
- The Red Strat – David Gilmour's second-most famous Stratocaster. It was used during Pink Floyd's last two albums, A Momentary Lapse of Reason and The Division Bell along with white-colored back-up versions built to the same specifications.

=== S ===
- Sabionari (1679) – one of the five surviving guitars made by Antonio Stradivari and the only one still playable. It is a five-course baroque guitar.
- Spidey – a yellow Gibson SG owned and played by Stan Lee of The Dickies, so named because of its Spider-Man sticker. A few years ago the headstock was broken off while in transit between the United States and Europe. It was repaired and was back in when the Dickies toured the UK with the Damned in 2012.

=== T ===
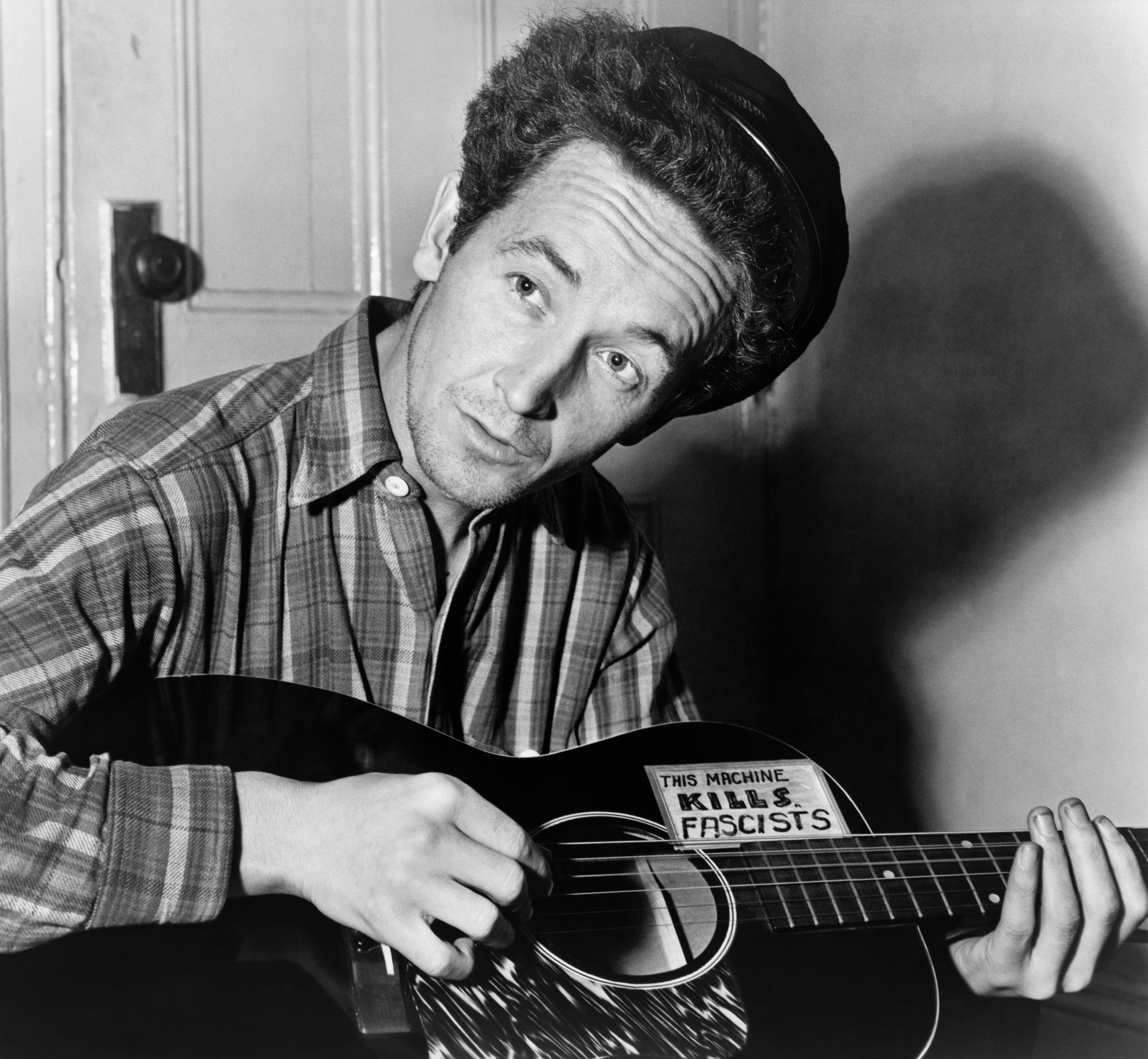
Woody Guthrie in 1943 with his guitar labeled This machine kills fascists

- Tele-Gib – a Fender Telecaster owned and played by Jeff Beck, heavily modified by Seymour W. Duncan in 1974 to employ two PAF humbuckers.
- This Machine Kills Fascists – a message that Woody Guthrie placed on his guitars during World War II that has inspired many artists. Guitar manufacturer Gibson has replicated Guthrie's 1945 Southern Jumbo complete with that sticker.
- Three-Wheel-Motion Low Rider - Jack White's highly customized Fender Telecaster B-Bender guitar.
- Three-String Trance Wonder – Seasick Steve's guitar that resembles a Fender Coronado or a Teisco EP-7. It has an old Harmony pickup added (with duct tape).
- Tiger – Jerry Garcia's main guitar from 1979 to 1989 made by Doug Irwin, it sold at auction to Jim Irsay in 2002 for US$850,000. The total price was US$957,500 per the addition of the buyer's commission fee. In 2026, the Irsay Collection sold Tiger at auction for $11.5 million.
- Trigger – Willie Nelson's Martin N-20 Classical guitar. Nelson purchased the guitar unseen for US$750 and named it after Roy Rogers' horse Trigger. In 1970, one year after acquiring the guitar, Nelson rescued the guitar from his burning ranch. Trigger lore also tells of the guitar being secretly removed and hidden at Nelson's business manager's home for fear of forfeiture to the IRS for auction during Nelson's income tax problem days.
- Top Hat – A second guitar made by Steve Cripe for Jerry Garcia in 1993. It is on display at the Rock and Roll Hall of Fame in Cleveland, Ohio.

=== W ===
- Wild Child – a custom Jackson RR model used by Alexi Laiho. Black paint and gold hardware including Floyd Rose tremolo, single Jackson J-50BC pickup with JE-1000 gain boost circuit, yellow pinstripe bevels, "Wild Child" sticker with yellow letters. Stolen in September 2002 after the Spinefest show and since lost. "Wild Child" is also a nickname to Laiho and reference to a W.A.S.P. song. Jackson limited RR 24 and his later ESP signature models are all based on this guitar.
- Wolf – Also known as "Wolfie", this is another of Jerry Garcia's custom guitars made by Doug Irwin, it sold at auction for US$700,000 in 2002. The total price was US$789,500 per the buyer's commission fee.
- Woodstock Stratocaster – a 1968 Fender Stratocaster Jimi Hendrix played at the Woodstock Festival in 1969. The body is finished in Olympic White, bearing the serial number #240981. Sold to Microsoft co-founder Paul Allen and now rests in the Experience Music Project Museum in Seattle.
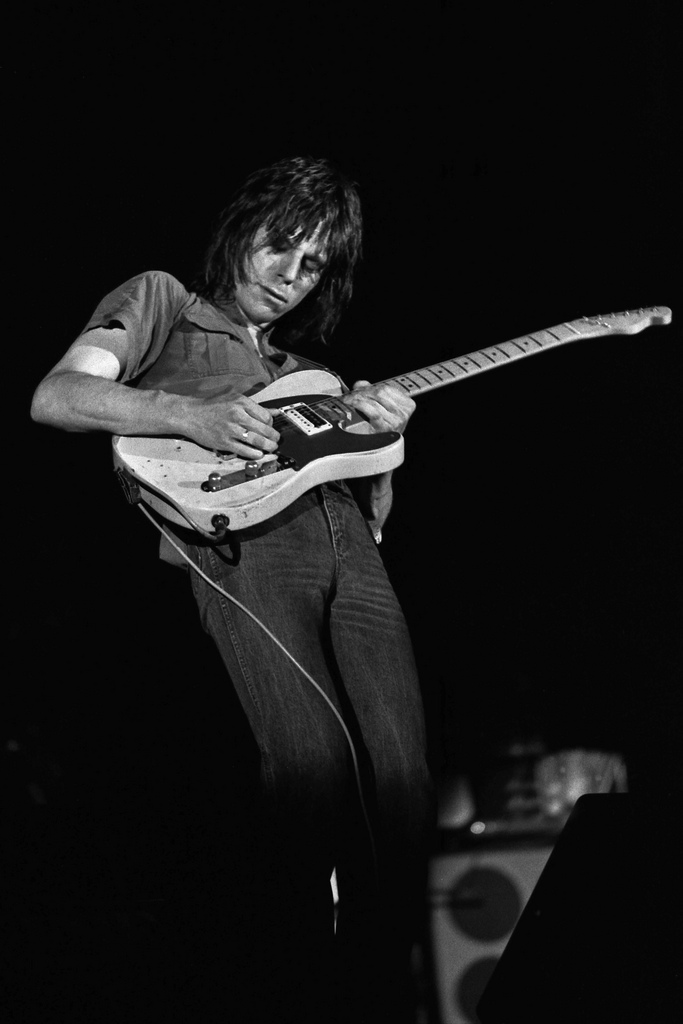
Jeff Beck playing Tele-Gib in 1979

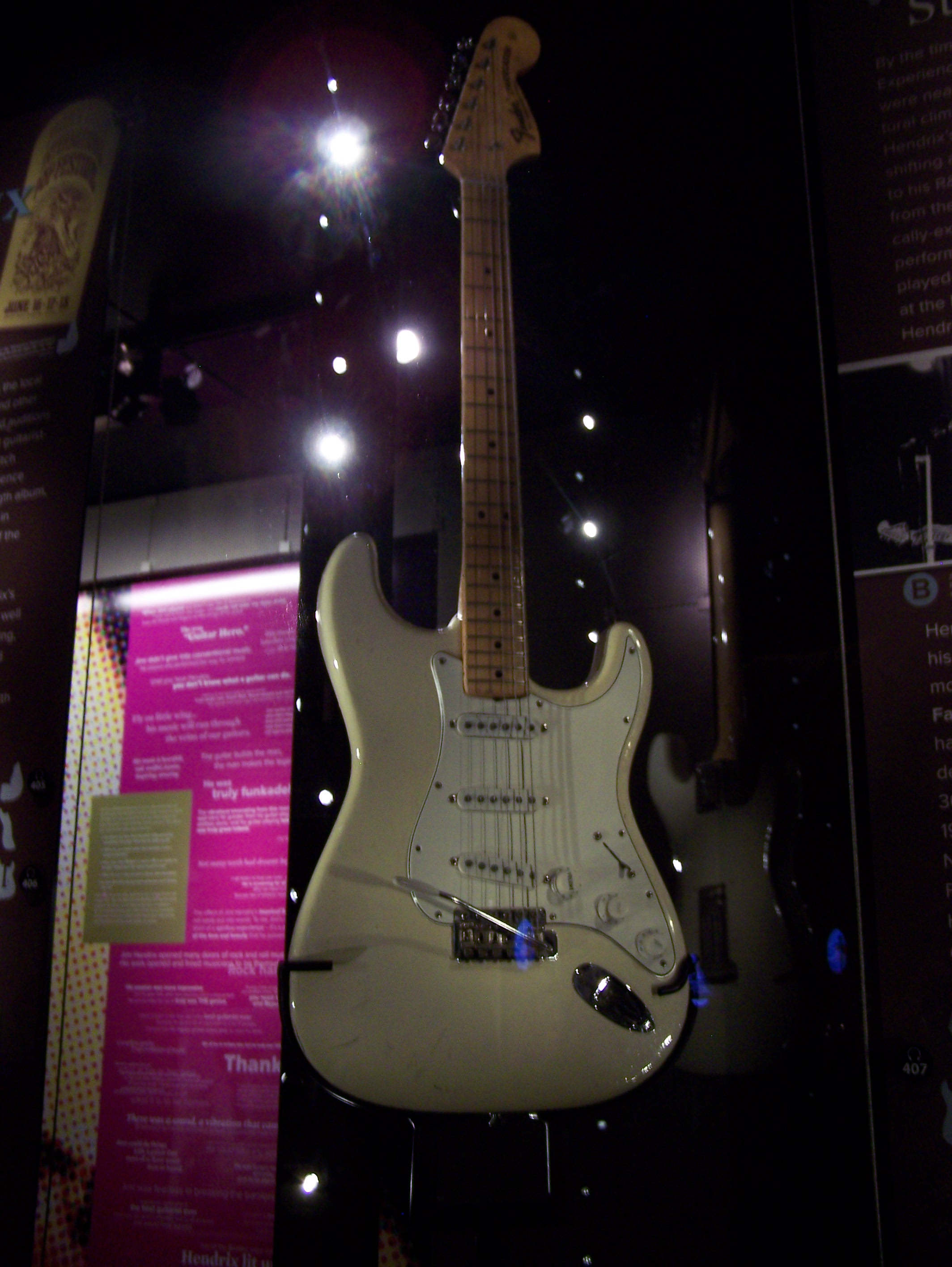
The Woodstock Stratocaster, played by Jimi Hendrix at Woodstock Festival

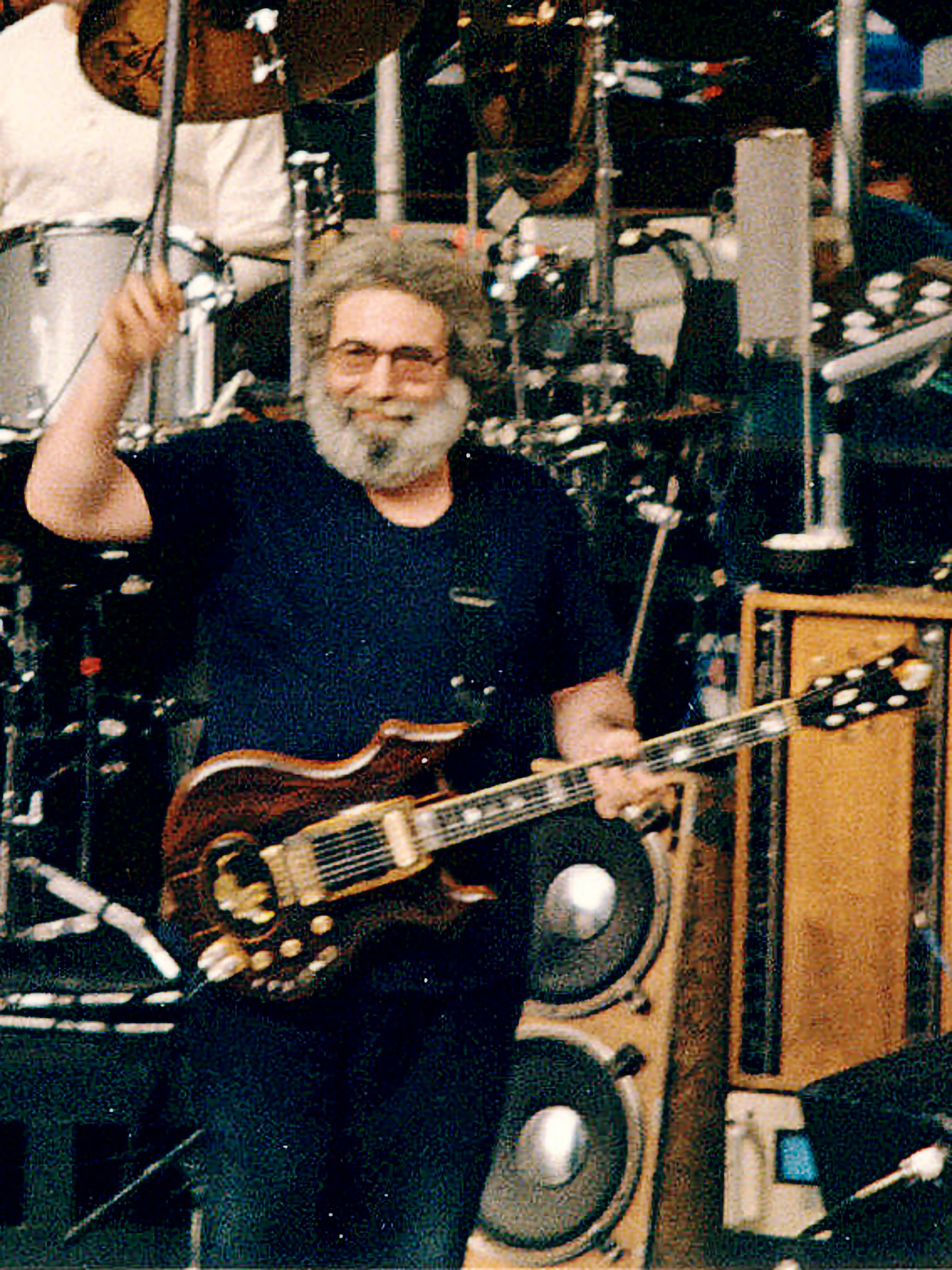
Jerry Garcia playing Tiger in 1987

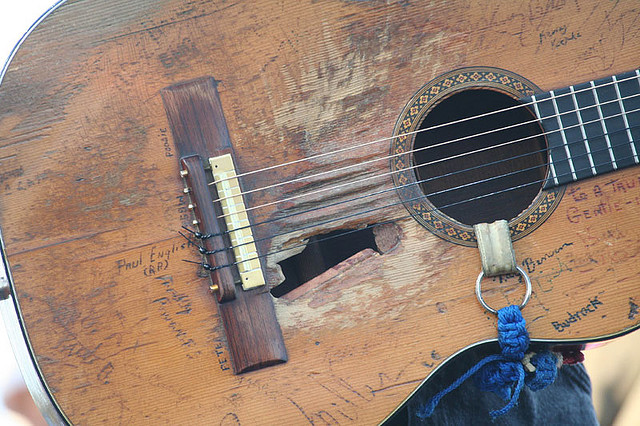
Willie Nelson's guitar, Trigger, has been signed by several of Nelson's friends

== See also ==
- List of signature model guitars
- List of string instruments
