= Old Black =

Signature guitar of Neil Young

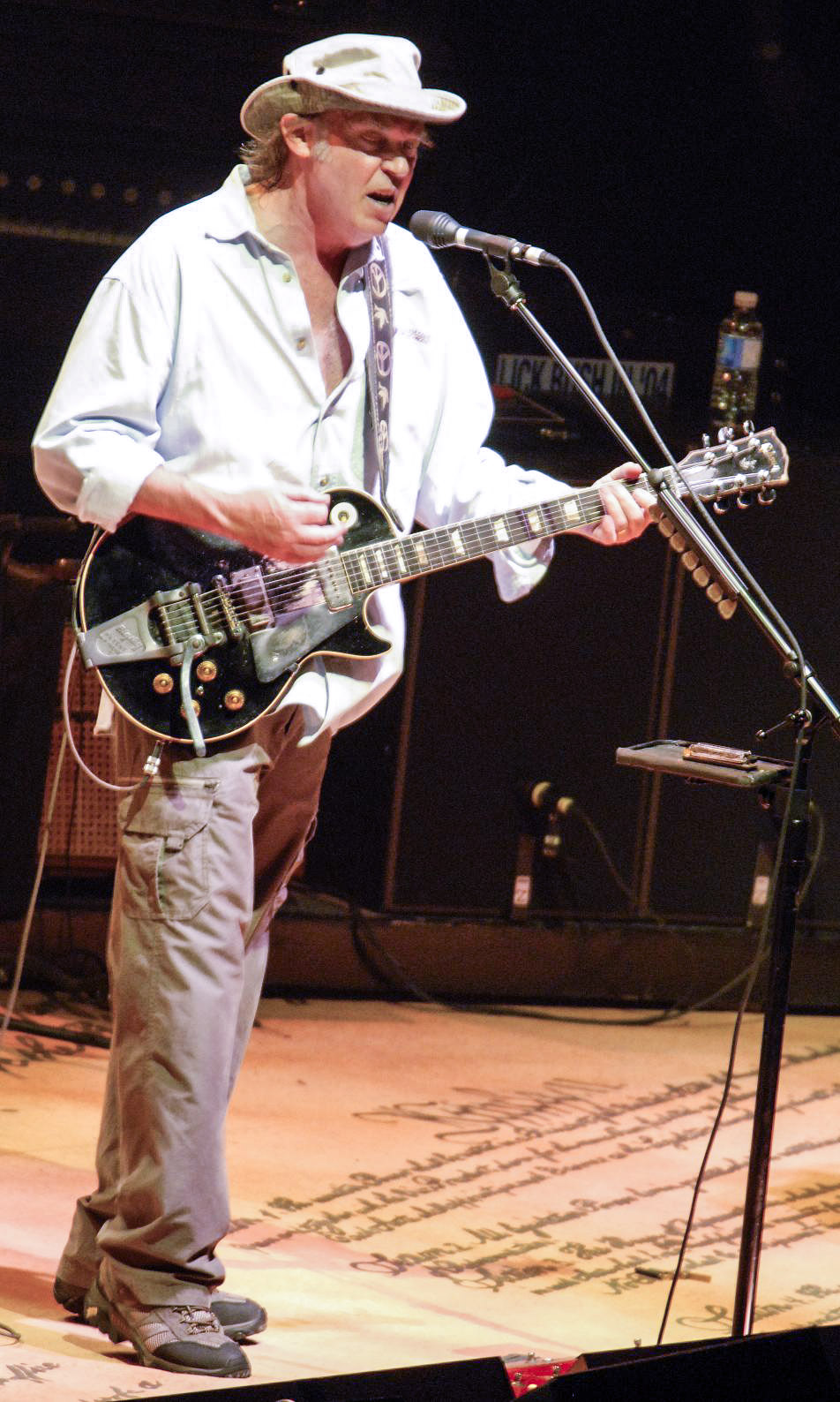
Neil Young playing Old Black on the CSNY "Freedom Of Speech Tour '06"

Old Black is the nickname given to Neil Young's primary electric guitar. Most of Young's electric guitar work has been recorded using this instrument. Though he has used a variety of different instruments, this Les Paul has remained ubiquitous and an obvious favorite. Young acquired Old Black in early 1968 in a trade with then Buffalo Springfield bassist, arranger and engineer Jim Messina.

== Appearance and customization ==
Old Black is a 1953 Gibson Les Paul Goldtop that has been customized extensively over the years, primarily by Young's guitar tech Larry Cragg. The instrument was traded for a '58 Gretsch 6120 with Jim Messina, the acting bassist and engineer for Buffalo Springfield (and Young's first solo album in 1969). Aside from replacing the (non-standard as of 1953) stop-tailpiece with a Bigsby B-3 vibrato tailpiece, by 1969 the guitar had changed little from what Messina handed him. It was featured prominently on a host of Springfield demos and was the sole electric guitar used on Young's first solo LP. According to personal hands-on testimony, acquired during the Crazy Horse gig at the Troubadour on April 22, 1969, (w/ sit-in by Stephen Stills) the guitar sported a Rowe-DeArmond M5-A bridge coil, Bigsby B-3 vibrato tailpiece, a (shaved, non-standard) ABR-1 Tune-o-matic bridge, chromed brass pickguard, truss rod cover plate and aluminum cover on the neck P-90 coil, Grover C-102 'Roto-matic tuners, an added 1/8" ebony headstock facia with thin crème binding, pearl inlays of the Gibson logo, the 335 'wheat-stack' and a lustrous black lacquer over-spray on the entire neck and body.

After finishing the first Crosby, Stills, Nash, and Young LP, and due to constant issues with hum from the DeArmond single coil, Neil pulled it and left it at a guitar repair shop to hopefully resolve the grounding issue while substituting a Gretsch Filter-tron for a short time. The guitar shop folded and the DeArmond disappeared with the owner. By 1972-73 he had switched to a '63 Firebird pickup, exchanged the Grover tuners for Schaller M6 tuners, the B-3 tailpiece for a B-7 and installed a mini-circuit switch to by-pass the on-board electronics. Eventually he had additional work done necessitating the addition of another aluminum back mounted cover plate and a maple inlay was added to the back of the neck running all the way to the end of the body.

Old Black is notable for its dilapidated condition, black and gold paint worn to bare wood, corroded aluminum, brass, and nickel plated hardware, caked fret board, and a microphonic Firebird coil essential to its sound.

Daniel Lanois plays a similar 1953 Les Paul Goldtop outfitted with nearly identical modifications, also built by Cragg, apart from leaving the original Goldtop finish and adding Gretsch knobs.

== Condition ==
Old Black has seen considerable wear and tear over the last 50 years in Young's possession, with most of the black and original lacquer worn from the mahogany neck and generally about 40% from the body as well. An inlaid maple stripe, extending dead center on the back from the head-stock crown to the end bout, has not passed the test of time well. An additional round aluminum access plate is present on the back underneath the bridge coil, which allows access to the associated wiring. The head-stock still has the ebony fascia and inlays are still in place though worse for wear, but the creme binding has long since fallen off. The original neck P-90 is still in place with its custom made cover that was broken on one corner in the process of attempting to fold aluminum to the proper shape.

== Other modifications ==
Old Black has also been fitted with a range of hardware over the years including; Chromed brass truss cover, pickguard, Grover C-102 machines, Schaller M6 machines, a Bigsby B-3 and B-7, a 'shaved' Gibson ABR-1 'tune-o-matic' bridge, mini-toggle by-pass switch in the front of the guitar dead center of the original control knobs. (allowing bypass of the on-board controls, sending the signal directly into the amp.) and a non-1953 issue stop bar tailpiece that was removed with the installation of the B-3. Additional modifications: the addition of a Firebird pickup in the bridge position replacing (in order of succession; the original factory P-90, Rowe DeArmond M5-A and Gretsch Filter-tron), a chromed brass truss rod cover, a pair of strap-lock knobs. Old Black is rarely seen without Young's famous Ace cloth guitar strap which has also seen repair, maintenance and modifications over the years. (The "peace" guitar strap has been reissued by D'Andrea under the original Ace brand.)

== Usage ==
Early on, Young strongly favored the Gretsch 6120, which he used in the Mynah Birds and Buffalo Springfield, though towards their end he acquired a Stereo Gretsch White Falcon and later removed the master volume, which he has sporadically used as well throughout his career. On a radio interview in 1969 he stated he owned an 11-guitar collection, but from then onward, the majority of Young's electric guitar work has been recorded using Old Black (with the exception of the so-called "Ditch Trilogy"). On stage he has toyed with Telecasters and Flying Vs and was even photographed jamming with Jimmy Page using a borrowed Rickenbacker 615, but he always comes back to the LP. Within the last two decades he has outfitted two original '53 Gold Tops identical to Old Black as "Black-ups", though the gold finish remains on both.

== See also ==
- List of guitars
