= Norman Harris (businessman) =

American vintage guitar dealer

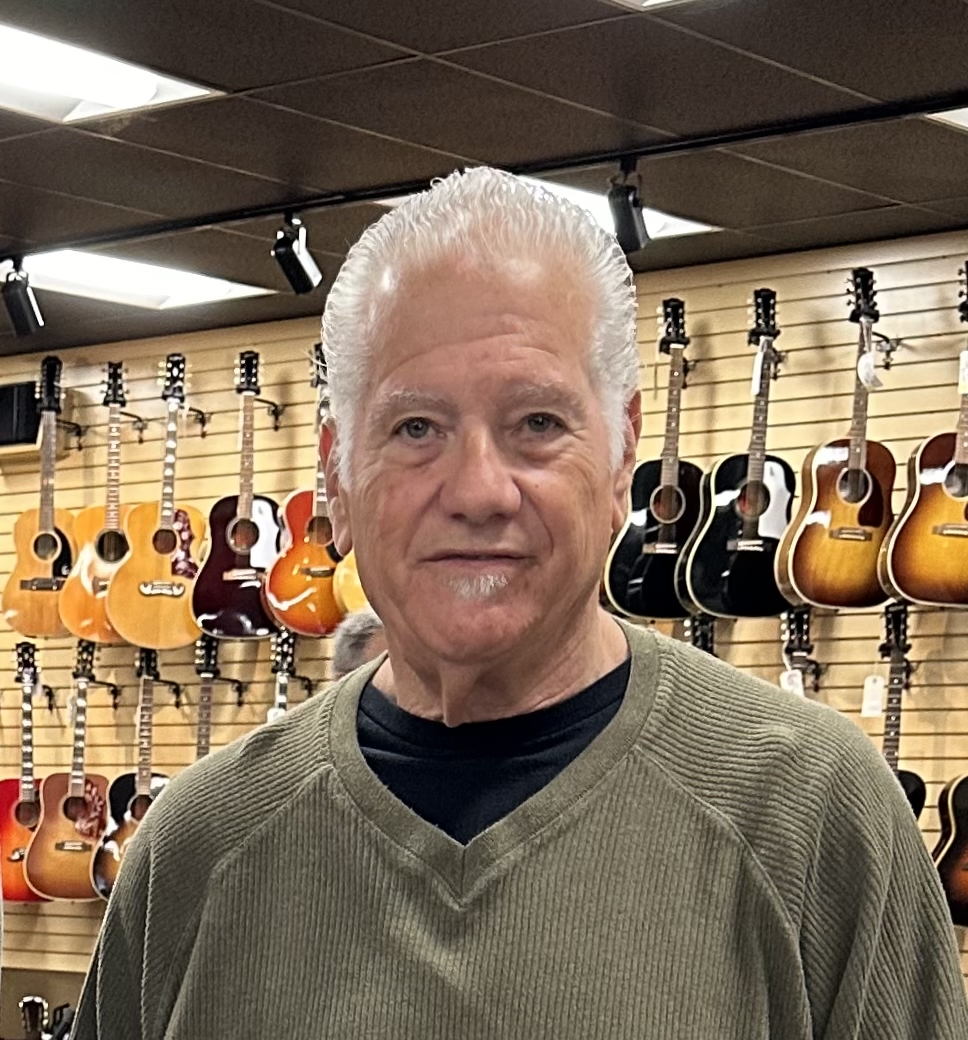
- Norman Harris (2024)
- Born: January 20, 1949 (age 77)
- Occupations: Musician; salesman; author
- Years active: 1965–present

Norman Harris (born 1949) is an American vintage guitar dealer, and he operates a store called Norman's Rare Guitars in Tarzana, California. He is one of the guitar industry's foremost experts on vintage guitars. His store, Norman's Rare Guitars, has become a destination and he has become a celebrity through his YouTube channel which has more than 500,000 subscribers. He is also the author of two books about vintage guitars.

== Career ==
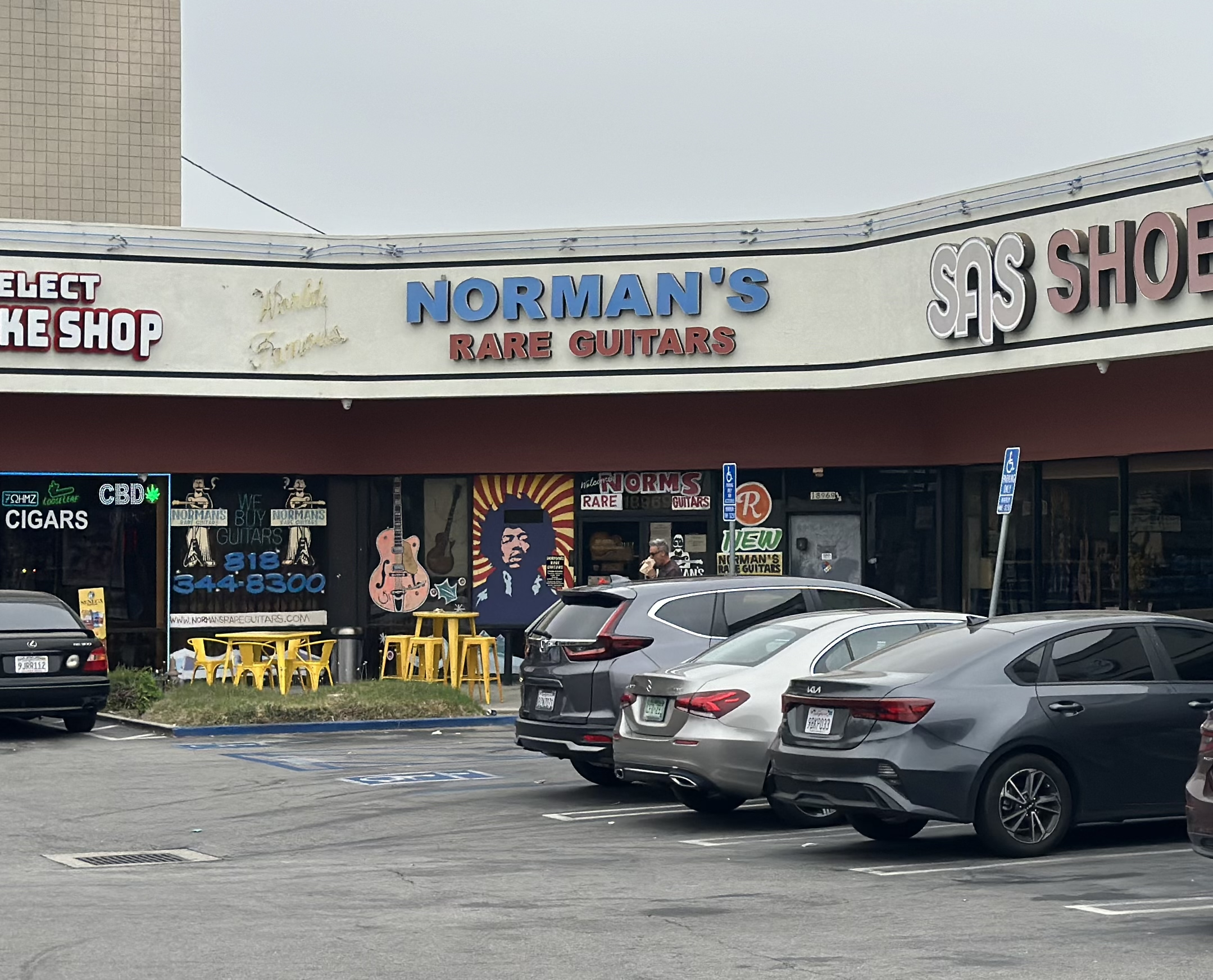
Norman's Rare Guitars

In the 1960s Harris was a Hammond Organ player who played in bands touring in the Miami, Florida area. In the 1970s Harris was playing in a band with Bobby Caldwell called Katmandu, and the band toured in Los Angeles. While playing with the band Harris purchased a vintage Fender Jazz Bass. Soon other musicians loved the Jazz bass and offered Harris much more money than he paid for the guitar. Harris decided to supplement his income by selling vintage guitars.

Harris saw the value of selling vintage guitars and in 1975 he opened a store in Reseda, California. Harris also rented guitars to be used in the movie industry, including the films Bound for Glory, The Last Waltz, Back to the Future, and This Is Spinal Tap.

Norman's Rare Guitars is frequented by many A-list musicians: Joe Bonamassa, Slash, T-Bone Burnett, Mike Campbell, Richie Sambora, Joe Walsh, and the now deceased Eddie Van Halen and Tom Petty and also Bob Dylan, George Harrison, Michael McKean and famous bands like Red Hot Chili Peppers, and the Rolling Stones.

Norman Harris is also active in a charity called the Midnight Mission.

== Social media ==
The store has 600,000 subscribers on YouTube, and 80,000 on Facebook.

Harris recently started the All Guitar Network. It is an Application that features guitar lessons, reviews and shows with artists.

=== Books ===
- Norman's Rare Guitars: 30 Years of Buying, Selling and Collecting (1999)
- Confessions of a Vintage Guitar Dealer: The Memoirs Of Norman Harris (2016)
