= Songbirds Guitar Museum =

Musical instrument museum in Tennessee

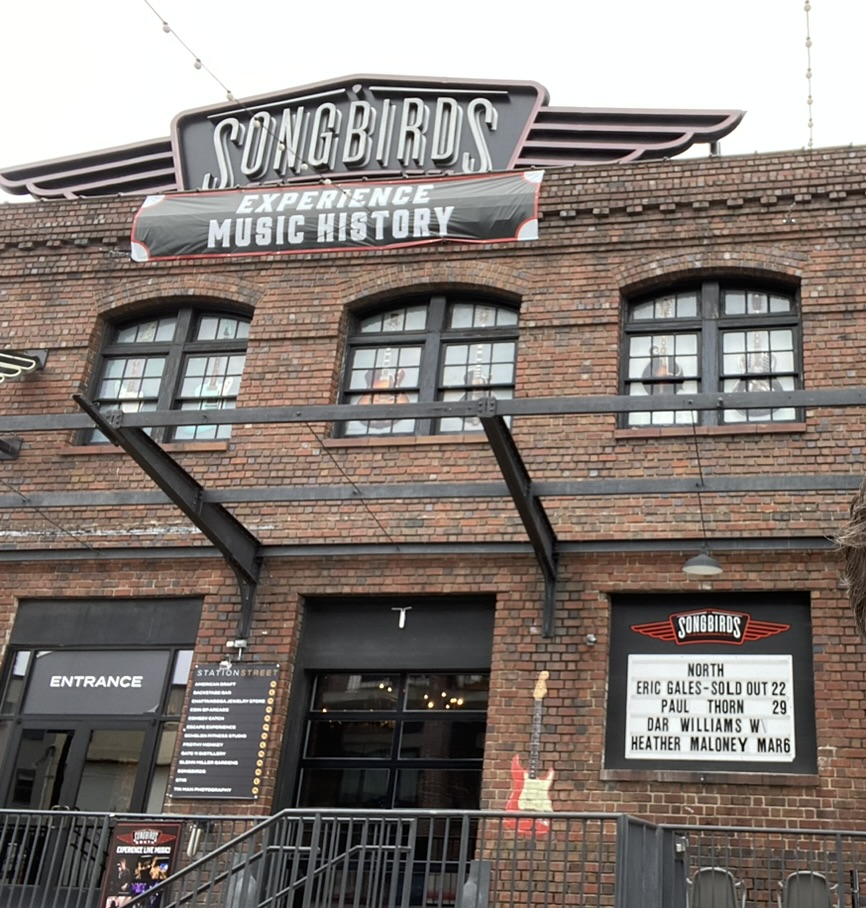
- Front entrance
- Established: 2018
- Location: 1407A Market Street; Chattanooga, Tennessee 37408
- Coordinates: 35.038371°N 85.307803°W
- Type: Music museum
- Website: songbirds.org

Songbirds Guitar Museum is a museum which features guitars and it is located in Chattanooga, Tennessee. The museum was opened in 2018 as a for-profit business: it closed in 2020. The museum reopened as a nonprofit organization in September 2021 and was rebranded the Songbirds Guitar & Pop Culture Museum.

== History ==
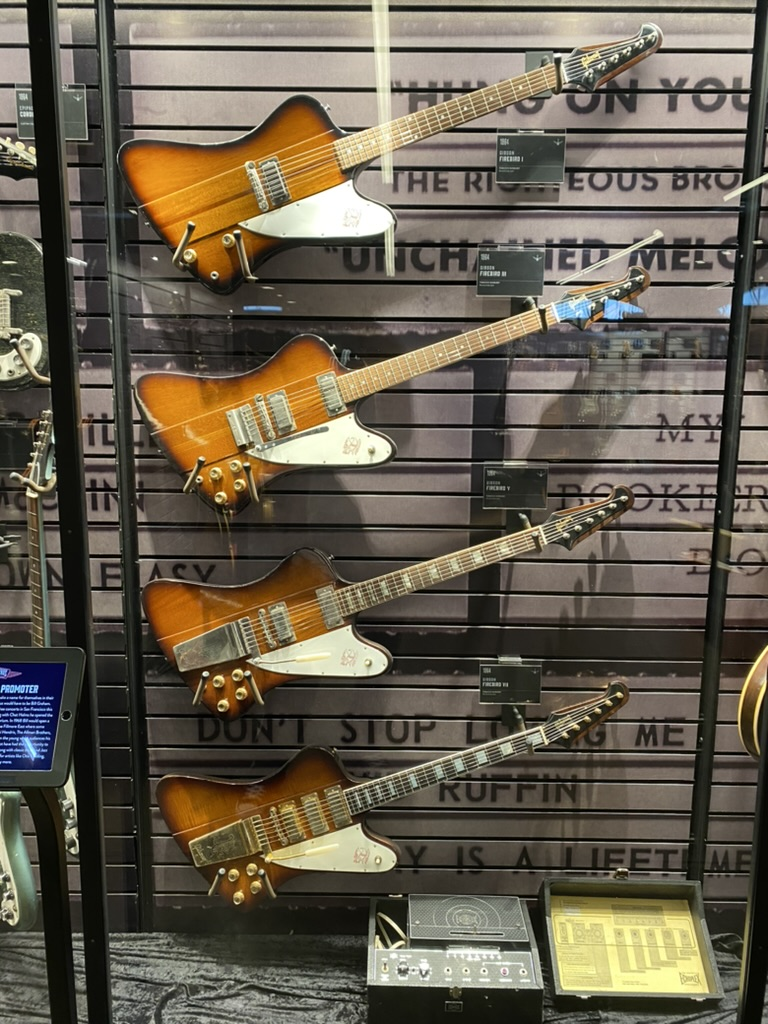
Songbirds Guitar Museum Sunburst Gibson Firebird display

=== 2018–2020 ===
The museum opened in 2018 in Terminal Station in Chatanooga, which was originally opened in 1909 and saw the arrival of dozens of trains per day prior to WWII. The curator was guitar collector David Davidson who collected rare guitars while the museum was funded and overseen by President Johnny Smith (of the McKenzie Foundation) and investor/collector Thorpe McKenzie. The museum displayed vintage and celebrity guitars, and hosted live music events. The museum had 1,500 guitars from a private collection; many were rare and valuable. The museum had two Gibson Explorers worth one million dollars each. It also had 36 1958-1960 Sunburst Les Paul guitars worth an estimated $250,000 to $500,000 each.

The for-profit museum closed during the summer of 2020. It was called "a victim of the pandemic" according to a documentary about the museum's closing. The documentary was created by Dagan Becket and it won an Emmy Award in March 2022.

=== Songbirds Guitar & Pop Culture Museum ===
The museum was reopened in 2021 as a non-profit led by Executive Director Reed Caldwell. The Songbirds museum is now a music venue and museum which displays about 550 guitars. The museum was rebranded as the Songbirds Guitar & Pop Culture Museum. On their website, they state that the Station Street location will close December 23, 2023, and they plan to open at 212 Main Street, Chattanooga in later March or early April 2024.

As of April 2026, it is named Songbirds and is located at 1407A Market Street, at the corner with 14th street. It now has 30 vintage guitars on display.
