= Harold Craighead =

American physics professor

Harold G Craighead
- Citizenship: U.S.
- Education: University of Maryland, Cornell University
- Known for: Nanobiotechnology
- Scientific career
- Fields: Applied and engineering physics
- Workplaces: Cornell University, the Nanobiotechnology Center

Harold G. Craighead (born September 21, 1952) is an American professor of applied and engineering physics at Cornell University in Ithaca, New York, where he holds the title of Charles W. Lake Professor of Engineering.

== Education and career ==
Harold G. Craighead received his Bachelor of Science degree in physics, with High Honors, from the University of Maryland, College Park in 1974. He received his Ph.D. in physics from Cornell University in 1980. His thesis work involved an experimental study of the optical properties and solar energy applications of metal particle composites. From 1979 until 1984 he was a Member of Technical Staff in the Device Physics Research Department at Bell Laboratories. In 1984 he joined Bellcore, where he formed and managed the Quantum Structures research group. Craighead joined the faculty of Cornell University as a professor in the School of Applied and Engineering Physics in 1989. From 1989 until 1995 he was Director of the National Nanofabrication Facility at Cornell. Craighead was Director of the School of Applied and Engineering Physics from 1998 to 2000 and the founding Director of the Nanobiotechnology Center from 2000 to 2001. He served as Interim Dean of the College of Engineering from 2001 to 2002 after which he returned to the Nanobiotechnology Center as co-director. He has been a pioneer in nanofabrication methods and the application of engineered nanosystems for research and device applications. Throughout his career he has contributed to numerous scientific journals with over 280 published papers. Craighead's recent research activity includes the use of nanofabricated devices for biological applications. His research continues to involve the study and development of new methods for nanostructure formation, integrated fluidic/optical devices, nanoelectromechanical systems and single molecule analysis.

Craighead was elected a fellow of the American Physical Society in 2004, "[f]or his significant advances in experimental studies of the physical properties and utilization of nanoscale materials and structures." In February 2007, he was elected to the National Academy of Engineering. According to the academy, Craighead, director of Cornell's Nanobiotechnology Center, was selected for "contributions to the fabrication and exploitation of nanostructures for electronic, optical, mechanical and biological applications." He has been a pioneer in nanofabrication methods and using nanostructures as tools in biological research. His research group has created devices that can detect and identify single bacteria and viruses, nanoscale gas sensors and nanofluidic devices that can separate, count and analyze individual DNA molecules.

== Stretching the Boundaries of Nanofabricated Devices ==
=== Lightest Biological Object Weighed ===
Harold Craighead and research assistant Rob Ilic have their research featured in the 2006 edition of The Guinness Book of World Records. In its Science and Technology section, the book cites the "Lightest Object Weighed:" a mass of 6.3 attograms. An attogram is one-thousandth of a femtogram, which is one-thousandth of a picogram, which is one-thousandth of a nanogram, which is a billionth of a gram. The entry is based on research reported in the Journal of Applied Physics in April 2004 (and profiled in the April 15, 2004, Cornell Chronicle), in which the researchers used changes in the vibration of a nanoscale oscillator to detect the mass of a single E-coli bacterium.

=== Smallest Guitar ===
The world's smallest guitar (the nanoguitar) came from the lab of Harold Craighead in 1997, and was created by Dustin Carr. Years later, a fancier nanoguitar was fabricated, and played using laser drive.

=== Smallest Nanobowl Trophy ===
Benjamin Cipriany and Philip Waggoner, research assistants in the Craighead group created the world's smallest Nanobowl trophy in 2007. This is to support the American Physical Society's Physics Central Nanobowl Video Contest, whereby high school students submit video entries that demonstrate some aspect of physics in football. The nanotrophy award and prize money were awarded on Super Bowl Sunday to students at Rochester Adams High School in Michigan.

== Professional titles ==
- Charles W. Lake Professor of Engineering
- Professor of Applied and Engineering Physics
- previously Director of The Nanobiotechnology Center, Cornell University
- previously Director of Center for Cancer Microenvironment and Metastasis, Cornell University
