= Vintage guitar =

Older guitar sought after by collectors

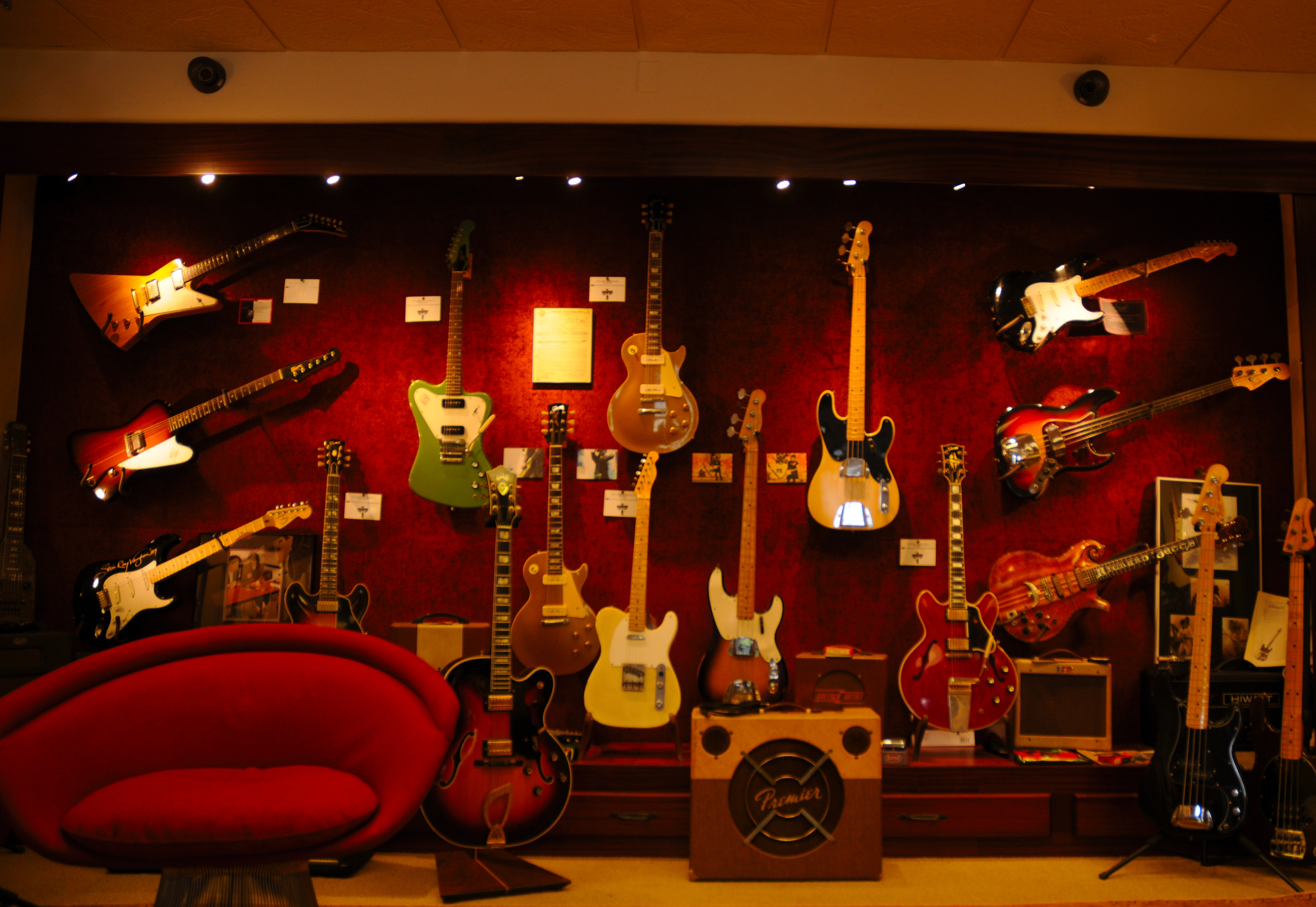
A collection of vintage guitars

A vintage guitar is an older guitar usually sought after and maintained by avid collectors or musicians. The term may indicate either that an instrument is merely old, or that is sought after for its tonal quality, cosmetic appearance, or historical significance.

== History ==
In the 1920s and 1930s, Gibson, National and Martin developed higher quality acoustic, mandolin and resonator guitars which would later become very sought after vintage acoustic guitars.

During this period, Gibson used a nomenclature related to the price of the guitar. For example, in 1938, a J-35 was $35, a J-55 was $55. J denoted Jumbo.

During World War II, metal shortages in the US meant that Gibson and Martin made acoustic guitars without metal truss rods. Hence guitars made before December 7, 1941 are more sought after. These are known as "pre-war" Gibsons and Martins.

The majority of the workers at the Kalamazoo factory in World War II were women. They would design a smaller guitar, the LG-2 acoustic, which would become one of Gibson's top selling guitars over the next two decades.

During the advent of popular music in the 1950s and 1960s, Gibson, newcomer Fender and to a lesser degree, Gretsch and Rickenbacker began to produce high quality electric guitars. After the Beatles exploded in 1964, production of Gretsch and Rickenbacker increased significantly.

It is this increase in production numbers post-1965 combined with the sale of Fender to CBS which saw the quality of electric instruments slowly decline, and hence the price of vintage guitars drops dramatically post-1965 depending on the company and model of the piece.

As early as the 1970s, musicians and collectors began to recognize the value of older instruments. The rising mass production of both acoustic and electric guitars in that era served to highlight the quality workmanship and materials of the older instruments. Historians, such as George Gruhn, helped to codify both the monetary value and sound quality of these guitars for both collectors and musicians. Norman Harris from California started to collect the pre-war Martin acoustic guitars.

Examples of well-known vintage electric guitars are 1950s and 1960s era Fender Stratocaster and Telecaster and Gibson Les Paul.

The 1961 Fender Stratocaster belonging to James Bond Music guitarist, Vic Flick is a good example.

In 1961, Vic's famous electric guitar would have been purchased new for around $200-250 US dollars. Today, this piece would be closer to $100,000 US dollars in value, partly attributable to the ownership by a recording musician.

Older electric guitars in general have become desirable, including "budget brands" such as Harmony, Danelectro, and Kay.

Examples of well-known vintage acoustic guitars are Martin and Gibson models previous to the 1960s, and 1930s-era Recording Kings, among others.

Values of vintage guitars have risen considerably in the past thirty years, and are considered by some as a stable long-term investment.

As a general rule, those electric guitars that were played by Rock and Roll stars including Jimi Hendrix, Eric Clapton, Jeff Beck, Angus Young and Jimmy Page are considered more desirable.

In particular, the late 1950s Gibson Les Paul made from Honduran Mahogany and Brazilian Rosewood is considered the most collectible vintage guitar in the market today.

== Collectors ==
American guitarist Joe Bonamassa is noted for his collection of vintage guitars. In 2018, he stated that he had more than 1,000 guitars and amplifiers.

== Relic'ing ==
Beginning in the 1990s, manufacturers like Fender and Gibson have used the process of relic'ing on newly-made guitars to mimic the aged look and feel of vintage guitars as an alternative to the high prices and scarcity of them on the market. Relic'ing is also popular as a DIY modification. The practice has proved polarizing within the industry, as many vintage guitar enthusiasts consider the practice inauthentic.

== Gallery ==
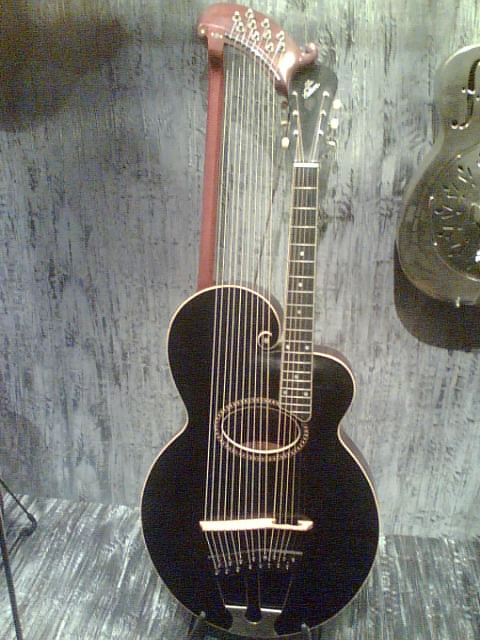
1912 Gibson Mandolin-Guitar Mfg. Co. Style U

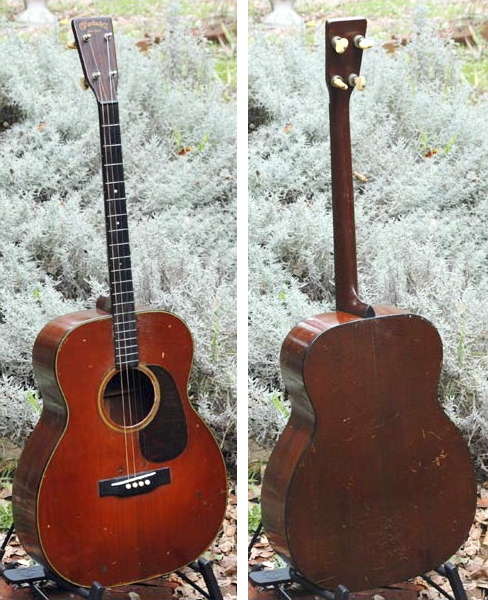
1932 C. F. Martin 0-18T Tenor guitar

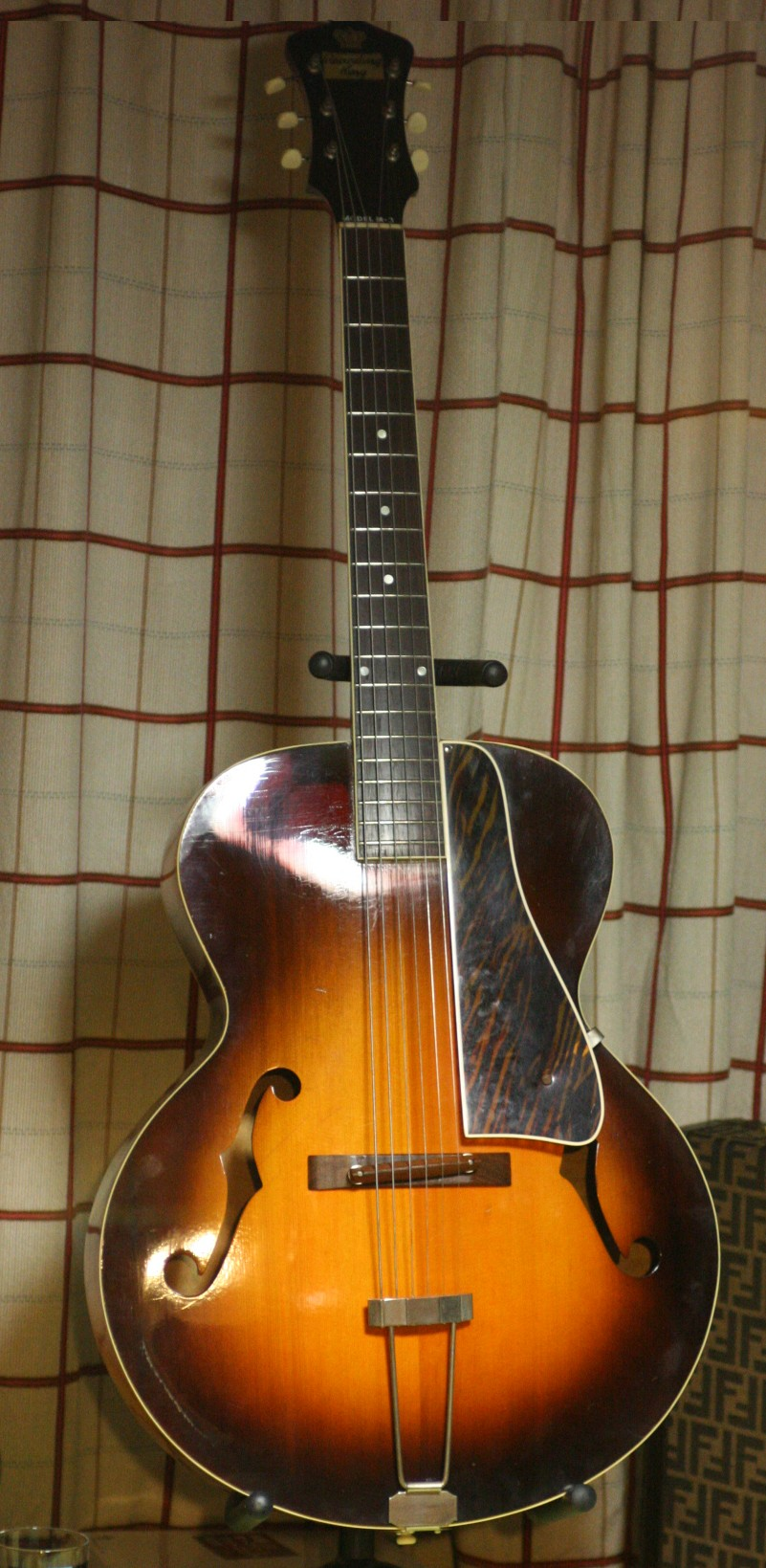
1940 Recording King by Gibson

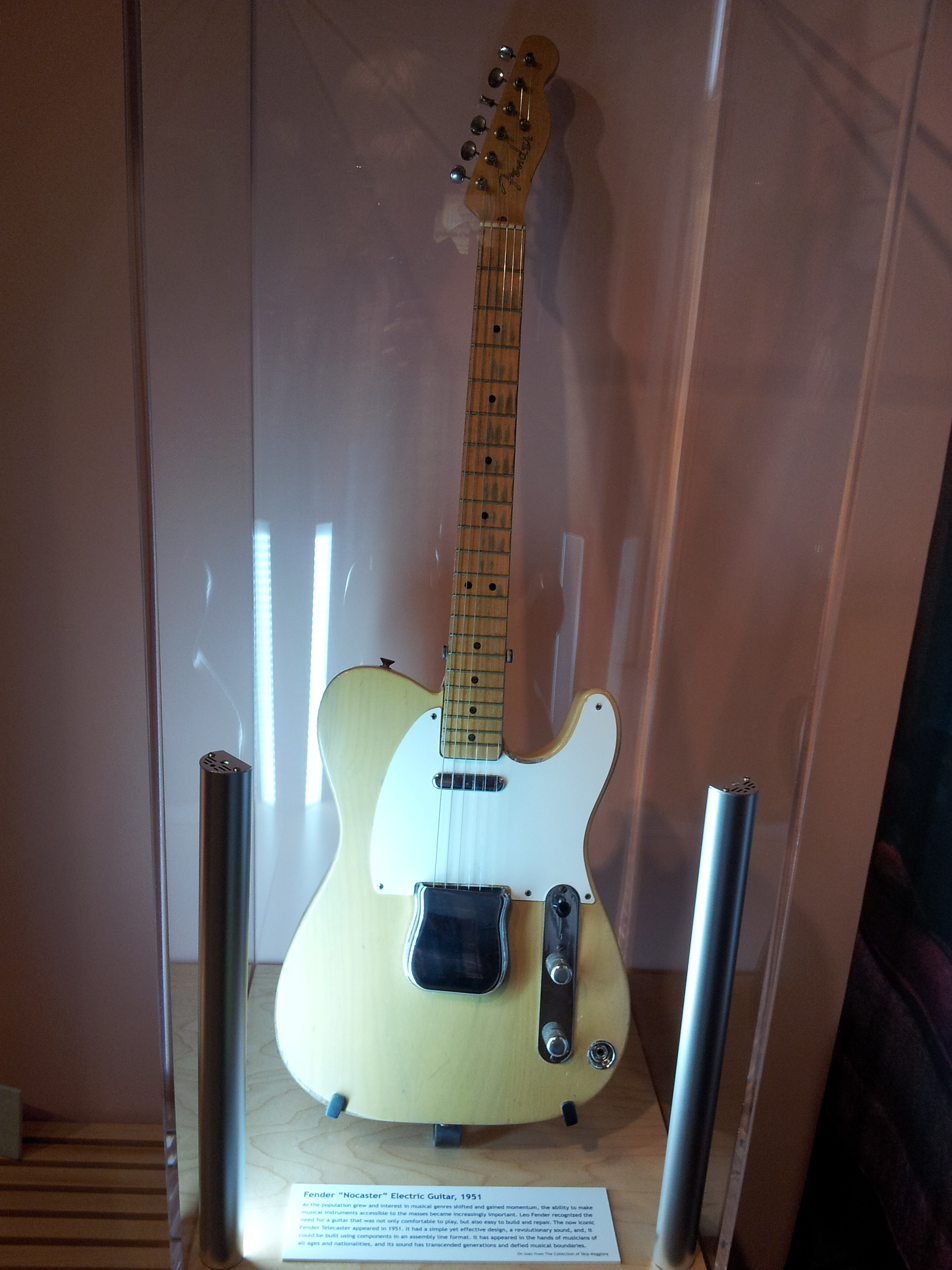
1951 Fender Nocaster

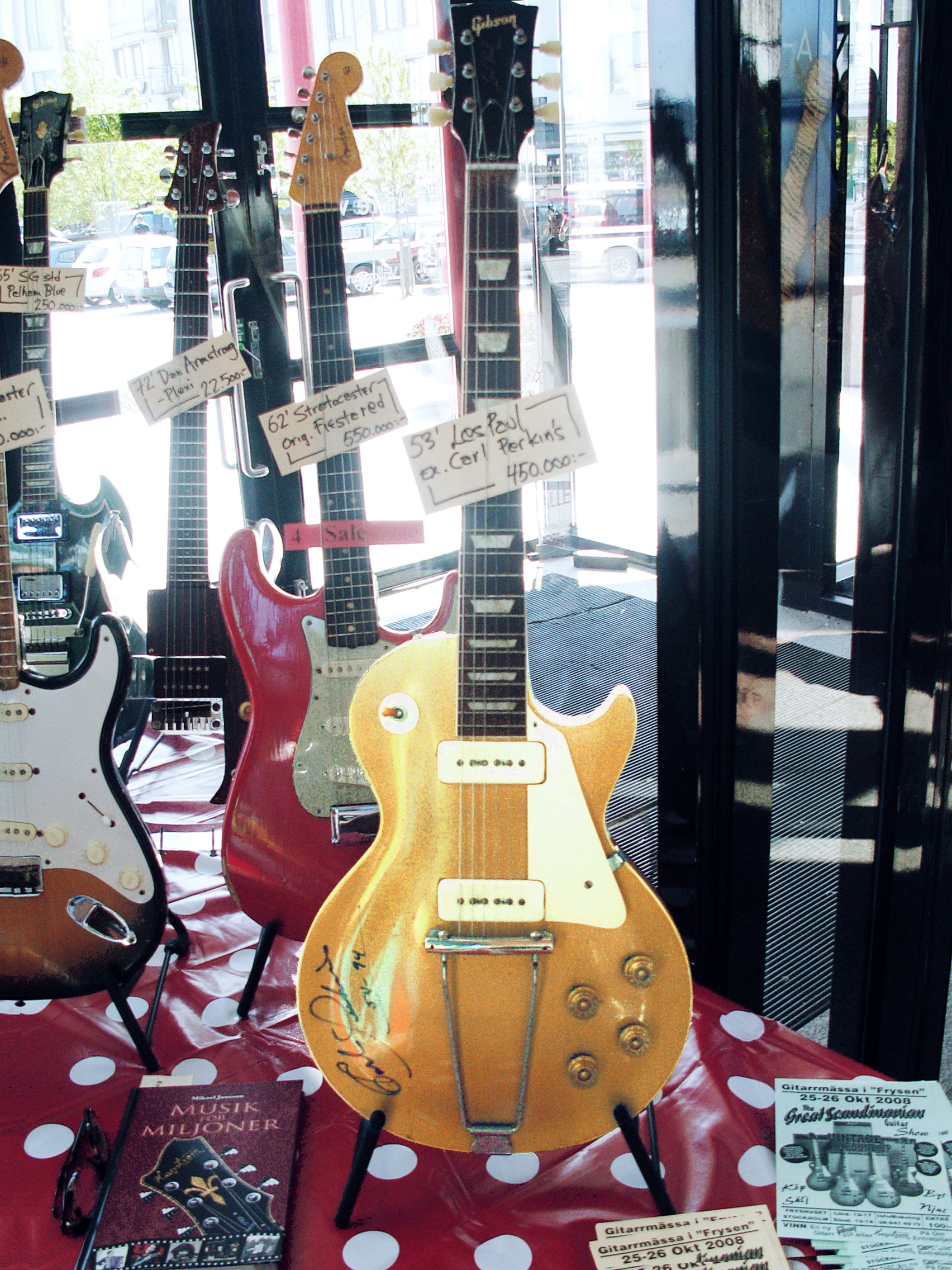
1953 Gibson Les Paul (Goldtop)

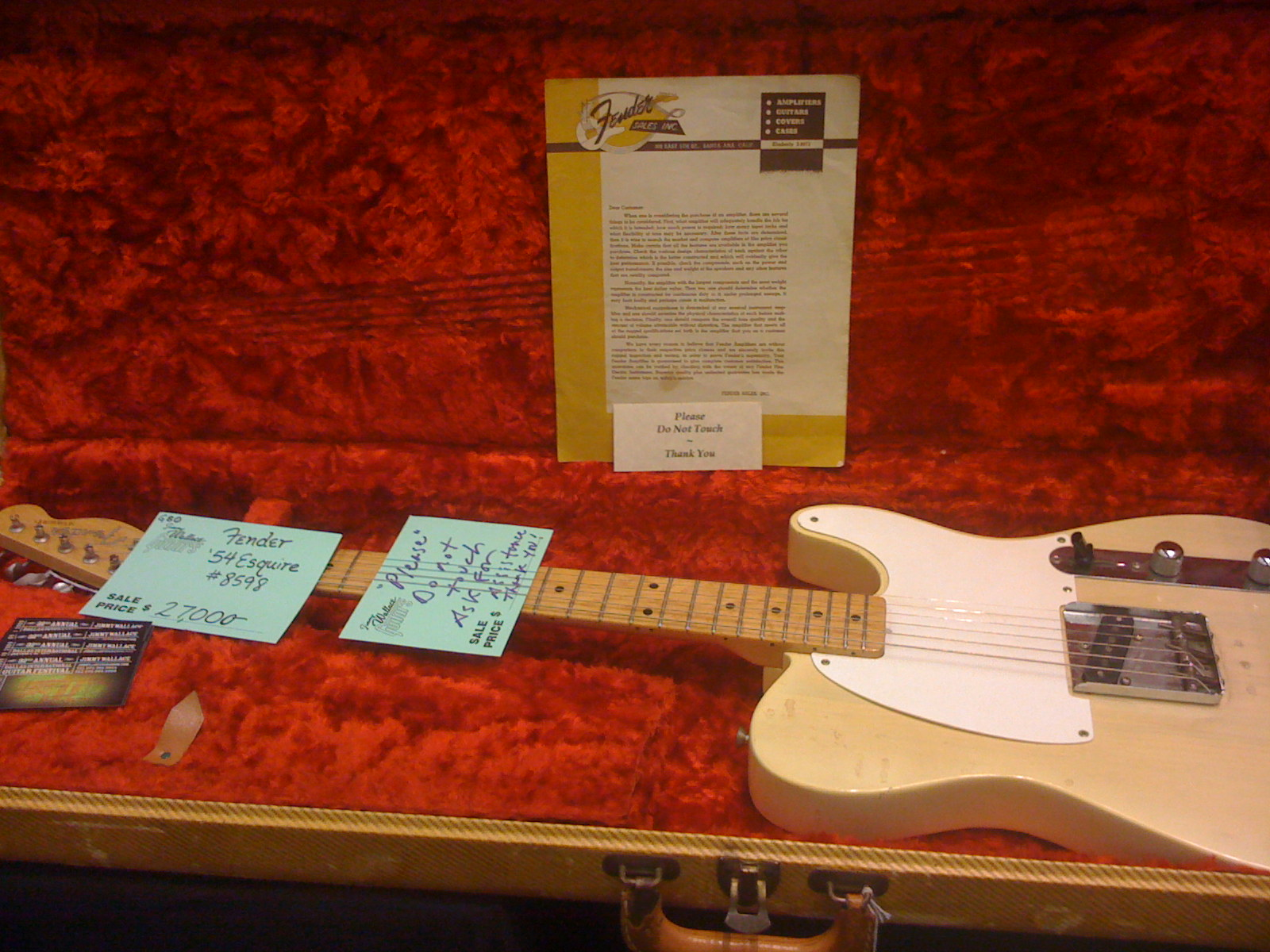
1954 Fender Esquire

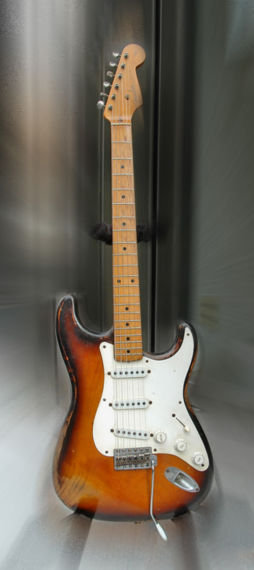
1954 Fender Stratocaster (Miss Daisy)

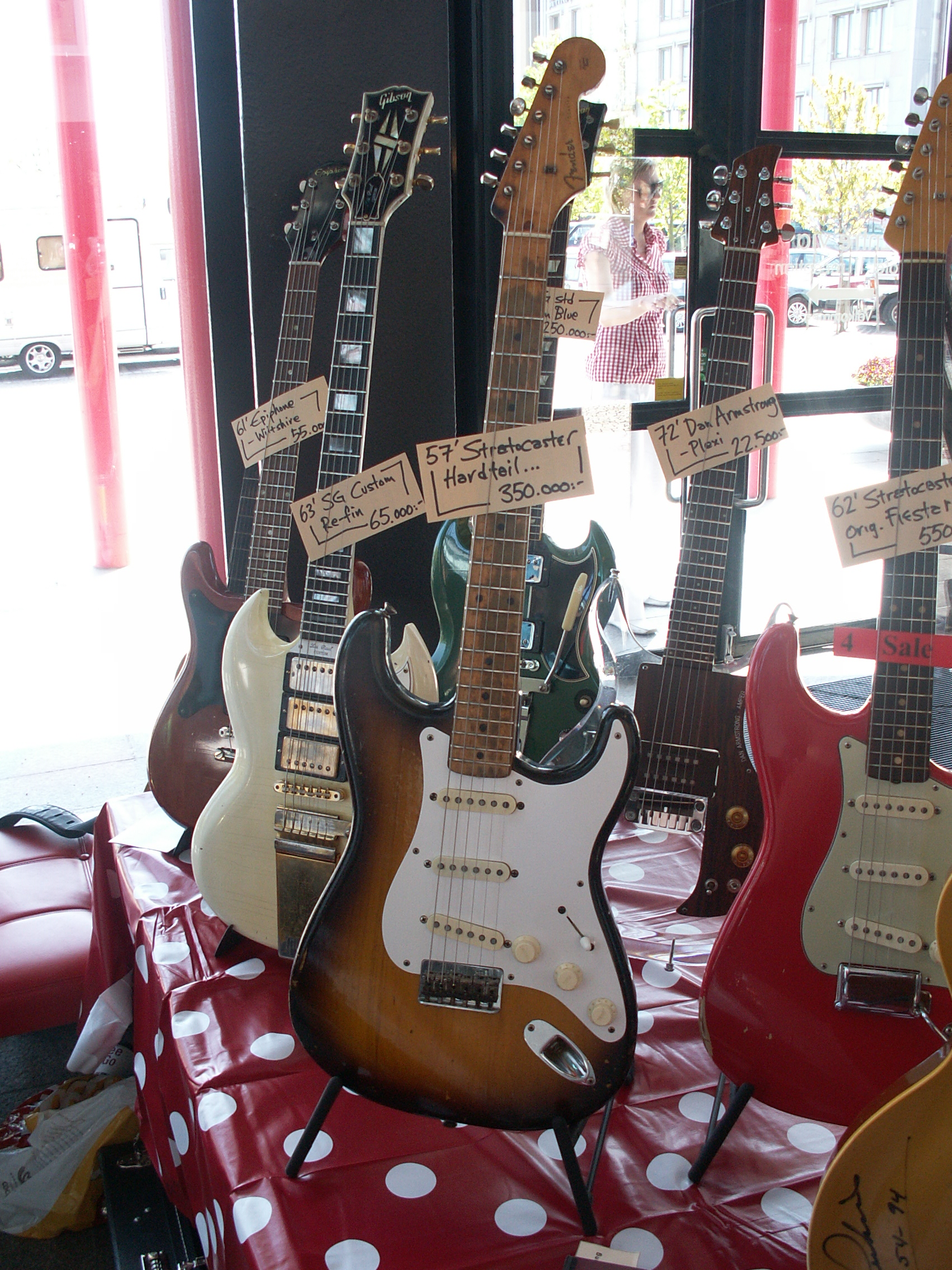
1957 Fender Stratocaster

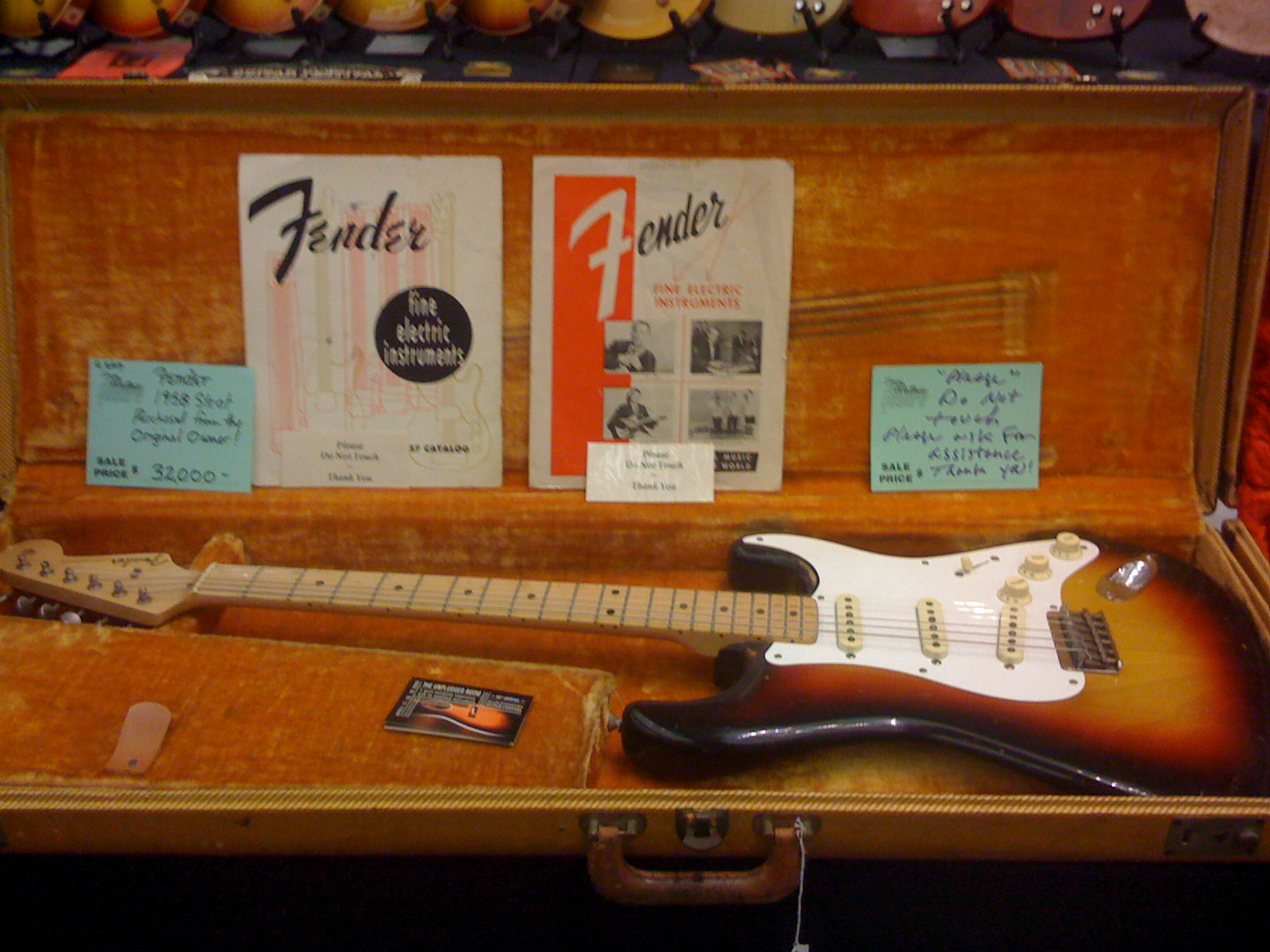
1958 Fender Stratocaster

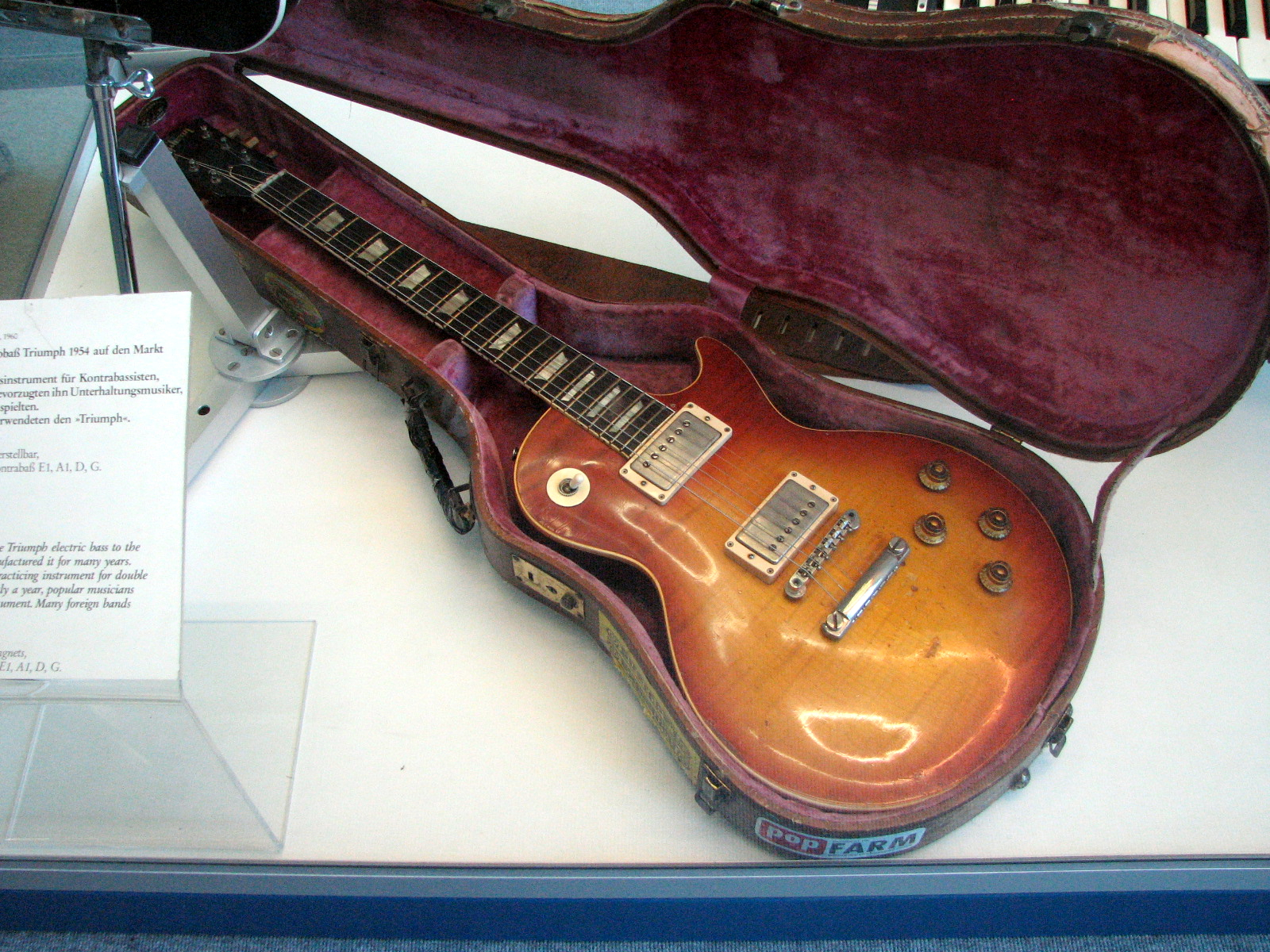
1958 Gibson Les Paul Standard

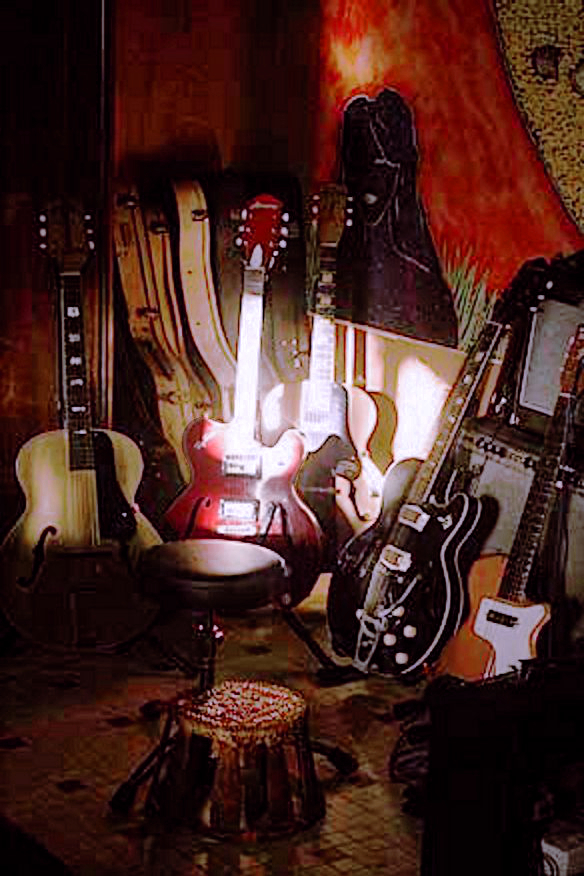
Harmony guitars

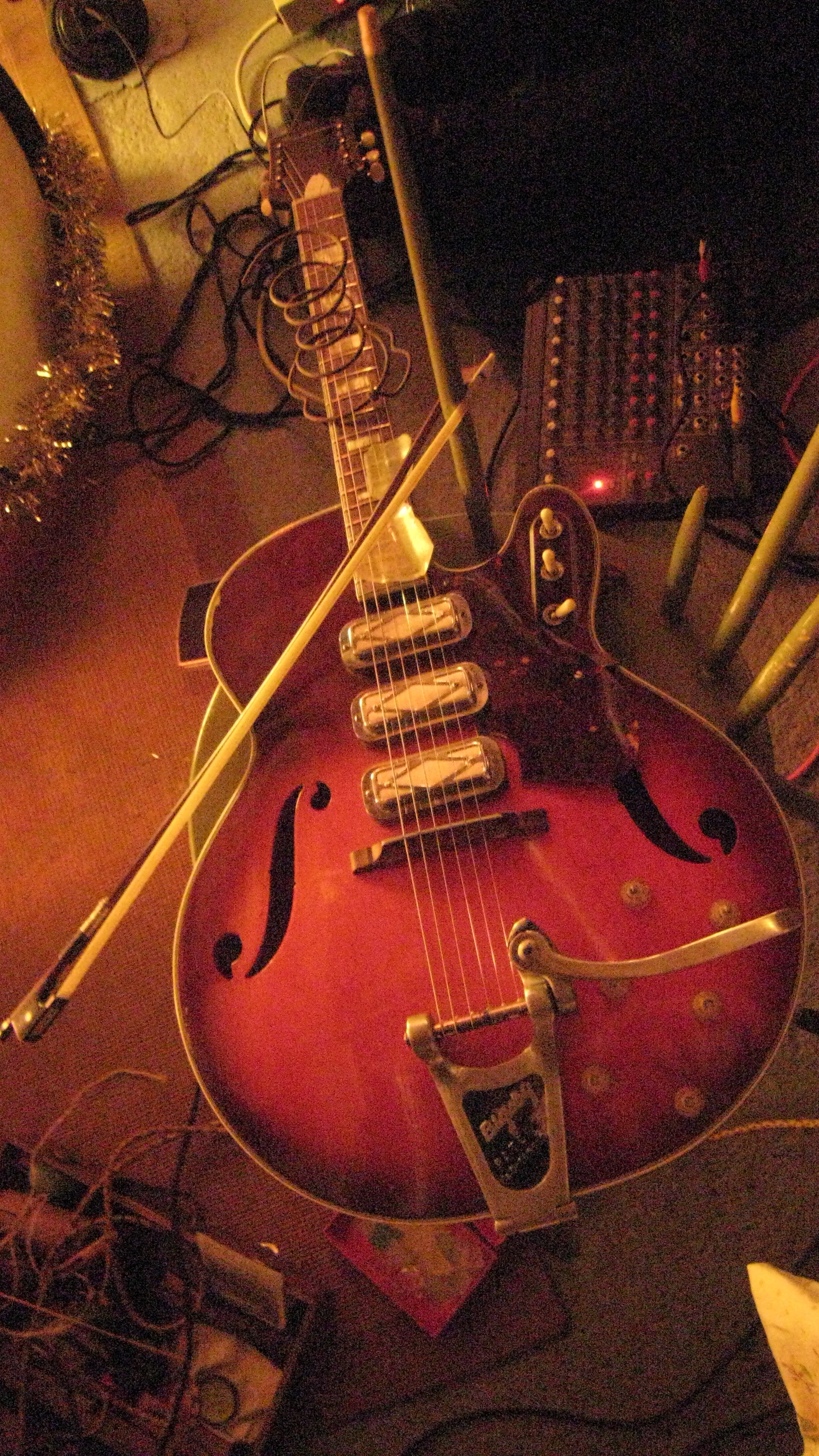
Silvertone model 1454 by Harmony

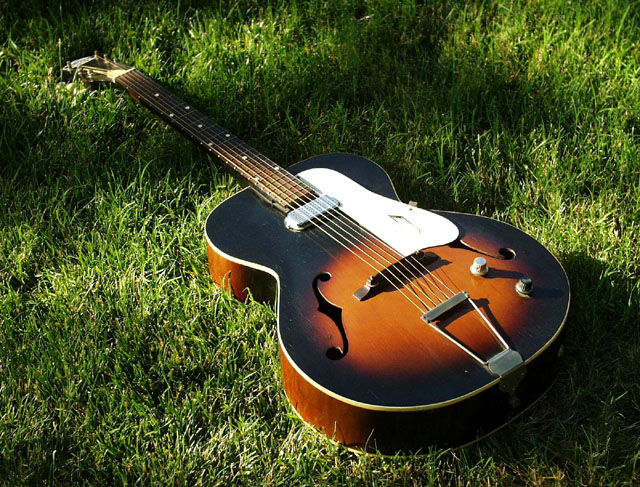
1960s Truetone by Kay

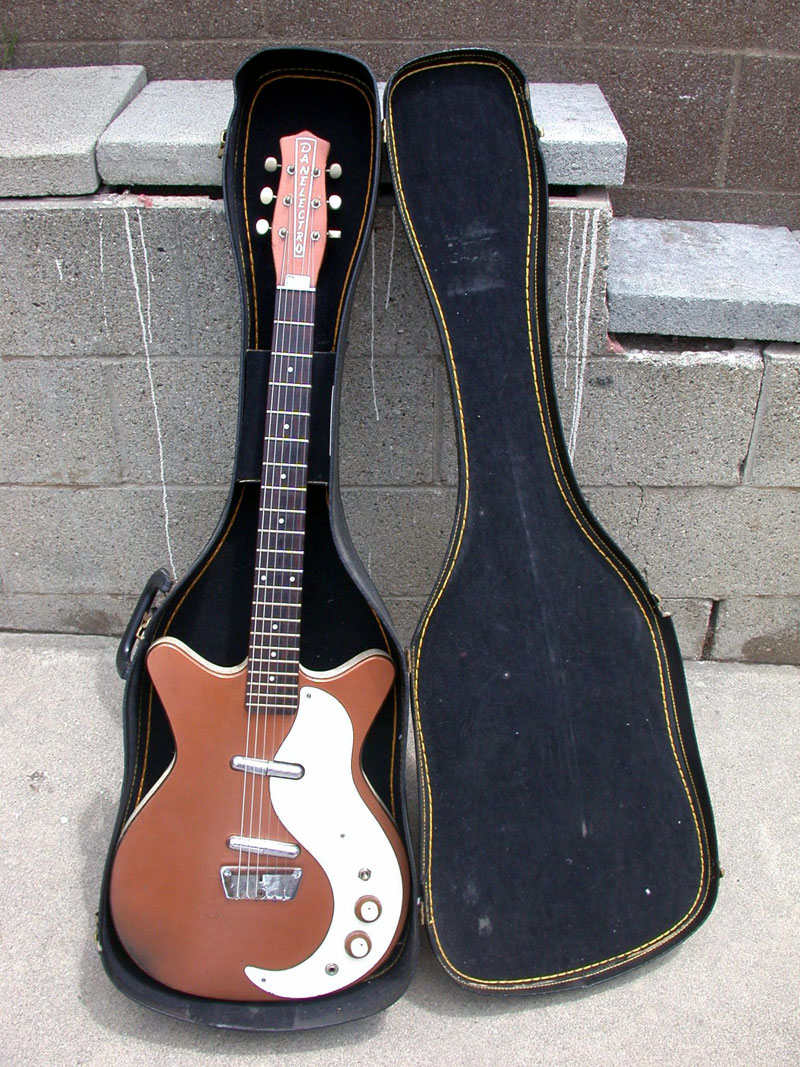
1962 Danelectro Shorthorn model 3022 (Bronze)

== See also ==
- Vintage (design)
- Vintage musical equipment
- Vintage Guitar (magazine)
