= Gibson Modernistic Series =

Series of electric guitars by Gibson

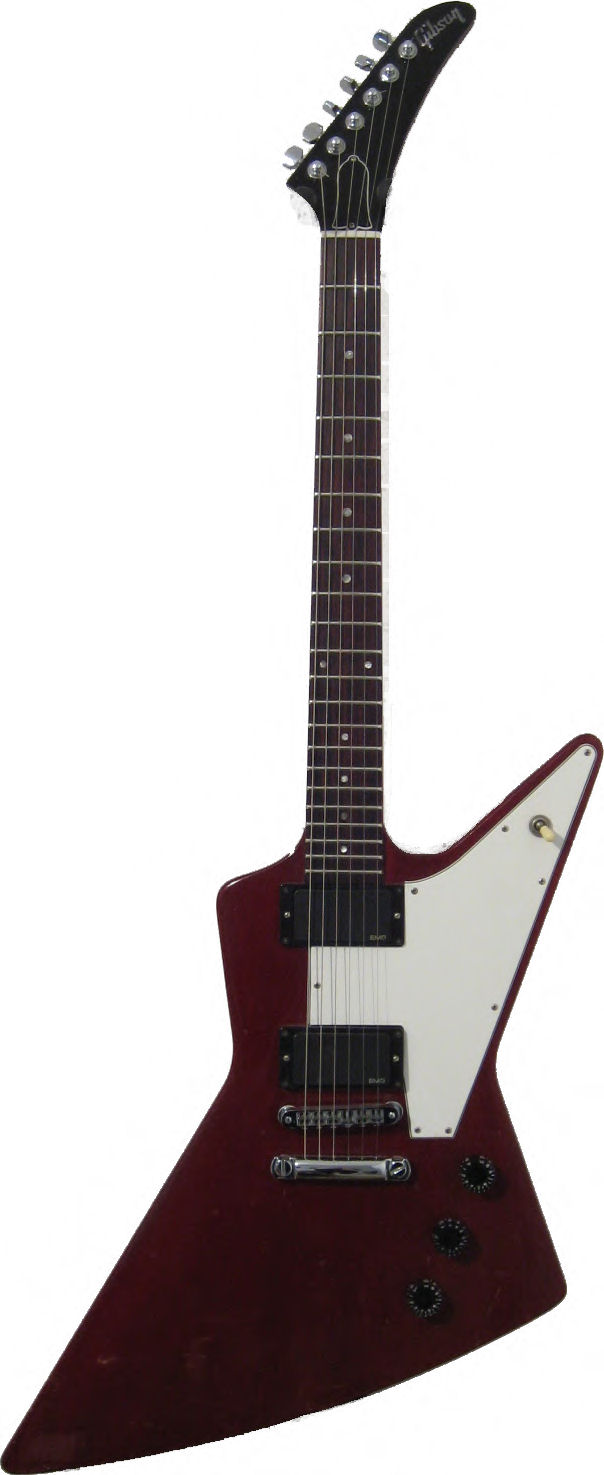
- Manufacturer: Gibson
- Period: 1958–1959 (discontinued) Reissued in 1967 and 1975

Construction
- Body type: Solid
- Neck joint: Set neck

Woods
- Body: Originally korina, reissued in mahogany
- Neck: Same as body
- Fretboard: Indian rosewood

Hardware
- Bridge: Tune-O-Matic
- Pickup: 2 Humbuckers

Colors available
- Natural

The Gibson Modernistic series is a line of electric guitars introduced by the Gibson Guitar Corporation in 1958, featuring futuristic designs inspired by 1950s science fiction aesthetics. Initially a commercial failure leading to their discontinuation, these guitars gained popularity among heavy metal guitarists in the 1970s, prompting reissues.

The series was a personal project of Ted McCarty, Gibson's president from 1950 to 1966, aimed at modernizing the company's image. It comprised three models: the Gibson Explorer, Gibson Flying V, and Gibson Moderne, all with solid bodies crafted from korina (also known as limba), a tropical wood. Unveiled in 1957, only the Explorer and Flying V were commercially released in 1958, with production ceasing in 1959 after fewer than 100 units of each were made. The Moderne remained a prototype, and no original units have been verified. Priced similarly to the Gibson Les Paul, the Explorer and Flying V have become prized collector's items, fetching high prices in the vintage market. If an original Moderne were found, it would likely set records for vintage guitar values.

Despite their initial failure, the Flying V gained traction in the late 1960s through musicians like Albert King and Jimi Hendrix. Its popularity surged in the 1970s, leading to reissues and inspiring numerous copies by competing brands.

== History ==
=== Background ===
In the 1950s, Fender revolutionized the electric guitar market with its solid-body Telecaster and Stratocaster. These guitars eliminated the resonance chamber of hollow-body models, reducing feedback and sustaining notes longer. (Note: The vibration of a resonance chamber interferes with the signal captured by pickups that amplify sound. Reference: "The Solid, Semi-Hollow and Hollow Guitar Body". Basic Guitar Knowledge Lessons. United Kingdom: Internet Guitar Database. Fender's) Fender's simple designs also enabled mass production, lowering costs. Gibson countered with the Gibson Les Paul, a high-quality instrument rooted in traditional luthier craftsmanship, unlike Fender's mass-production approach. Despite innovations, Les Paul sales declined.

Under Ted McCarty's leadership since 1950, Gibson innovated with features like the Tune-O-Matic bridge (introduced in 1954) and a device for easily adding pickups to guitars. By 1955, as rock music emerged, McCarty recognized Gibson's outdated image among competitors. To revitalize the brand, he launched a bold new series with futuristic, space-age designs, aligning with 1950s trends. In 1996, McCarty reflected:

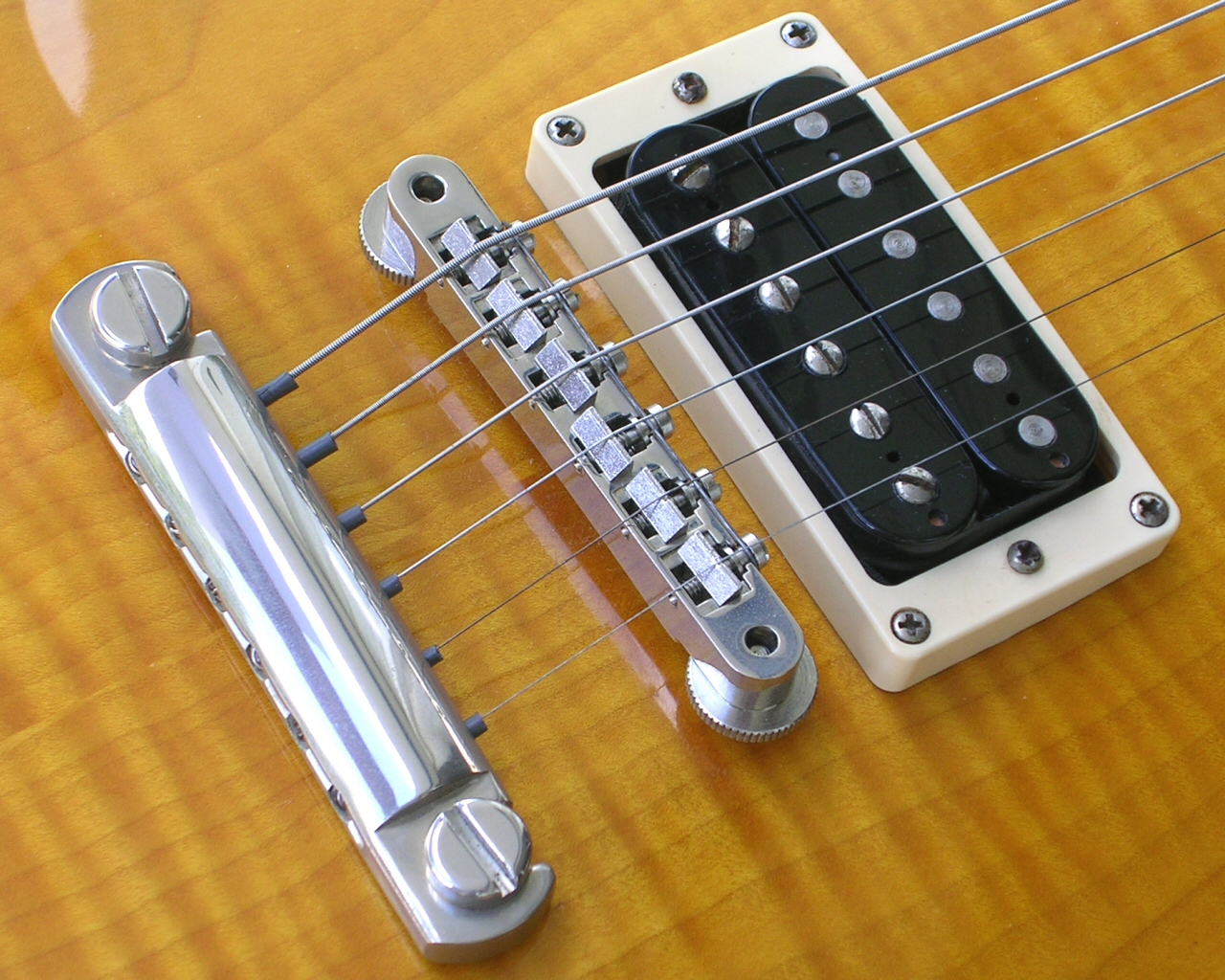
Detail of the Tune-O-Matic bridge and tailpiece, invented by Ted McCarty (Patent US 2740313), on a Gibson Les Paul.

Other guitar makers were saying that Gibson was a fuddy duddy old company without a new idea in years. That information came back to me, so I said we would shake 'em up if that's what they thought.

— Ted McCarty, 1996

The solid-body design allowed for unconventional shapes, as the absence of a resonance chamber removed traditional constraints, with comfort being the primary limitation. McCarty personally oversaw the development, commissioning designers to create innovative sketches for the Gibson Modernistic series: the Gibson Explorer, Gibson Flying V, and Gibson Moderne. The Explorer and Moderne evolved from nearly 100 proposals, while the Flying V was McCarty's original concept.

=== Development and launch of the original models ===
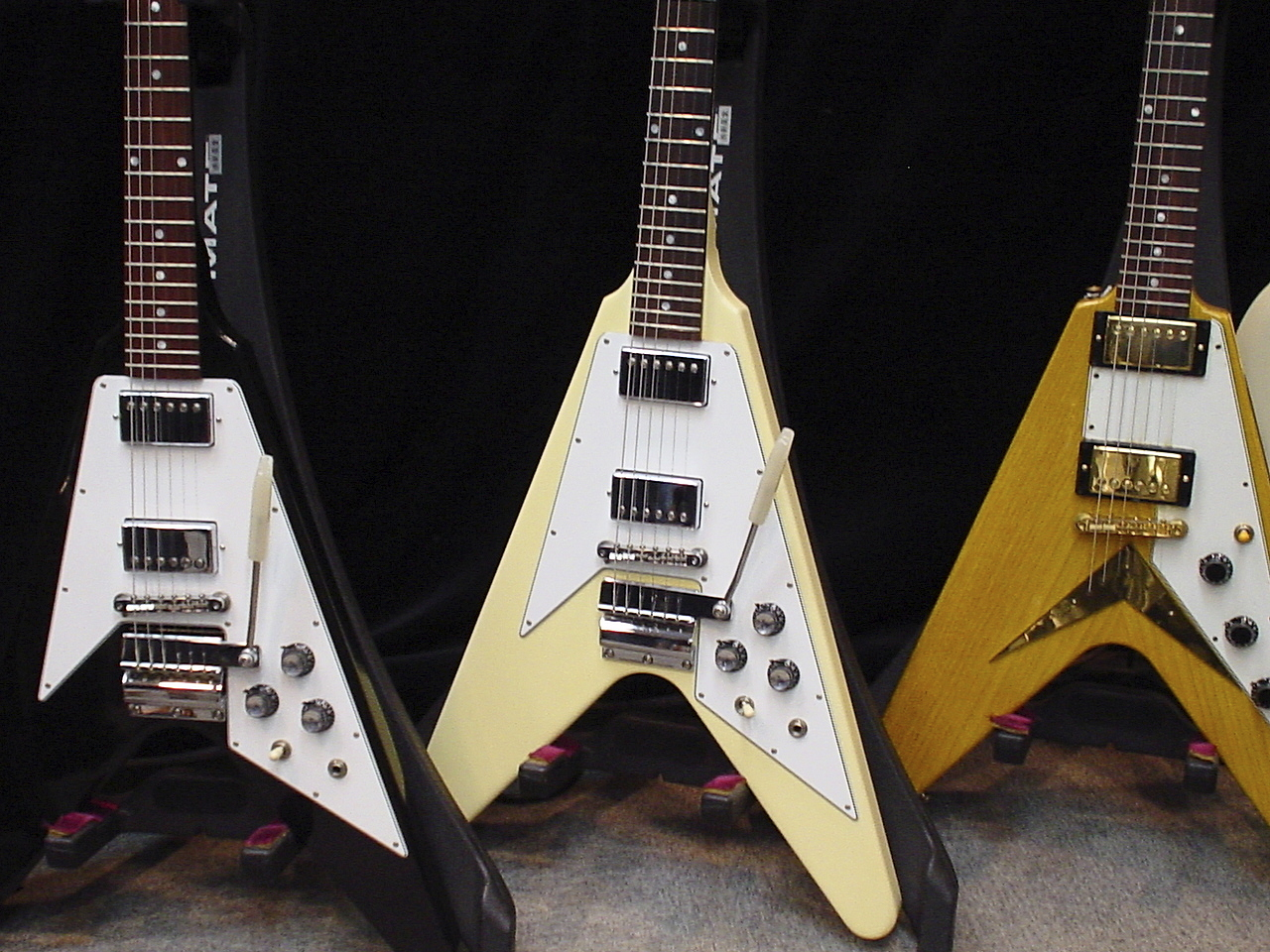
The distinctive shape of the Flying V. The model on the right replicates the original 1958 tailpiece and natural finish, showcasing the wood grain.

Gibson invited designers to its then-headquarters in Kalamazoo, Michigan, to submit sketches, which were reviewed by technicians for production feasibility. (Note: Despite the initial failure of the Gibson Modernistic series, McCarty later employed a similar approach by hiring Ray Dietrich, designer of Chrysler, Packard, and Lincoln automobiles, to create the radical Gibson Firebird (Seguret, 1999, p.122).) From these, a dozen prototypes were built. While some prototypes used mahogany, the commercial versions were made from korina, a light-colored tropical wood from West Africa similar to mahogany, previously used in Gibson's lap-steel Hawaiian guitars. Korina was chosen for its tonal qualities, avoiding heavier woods like maple, and finished with a natural varnish to highlight the grain.

A select few models were chosen for presentation at industry trade shows to gauge competitors' reactions. They debuted at the National Association of Music Merchants (NAMM) convention from July 15–18, 1957, at the Palmer House hotel in Chicago.

There is debate over the number of models presented, as McCarty claimed four were shown. However, patents filed in June 1957 covered only three designs: Flying V (application 181867), Moderne (181866), and Explorer (181685). A photograph shows Clarence Havenga, Gibson's sales director, displaying the Explorer design as the "Futura" at NAMM, one of several proposed names alongside "Futurama" and "Futuristic," which may explain the discrepancy.

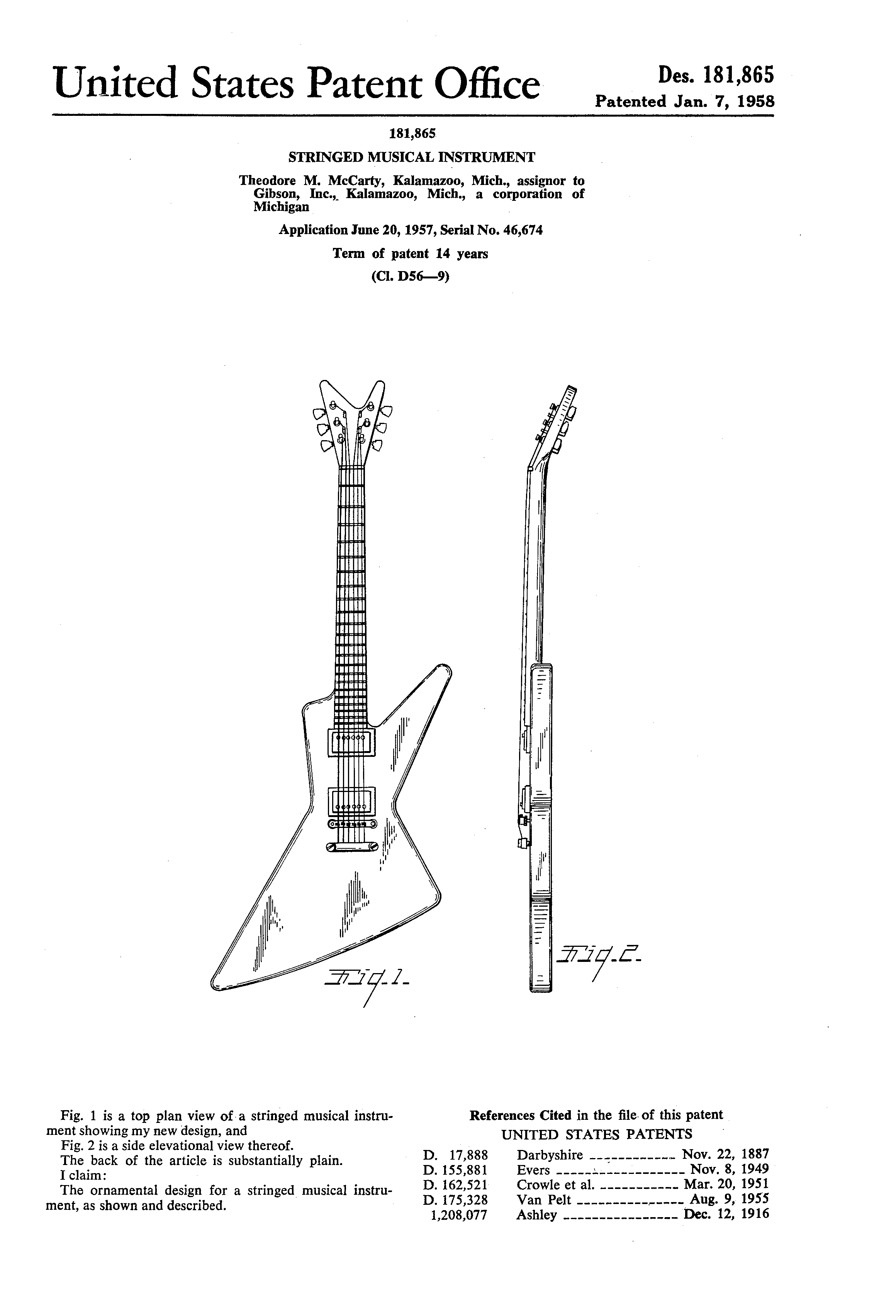
Patent drawing of the Gibson Futura, prototype for the Gibson Explorer.

==== Gibson Explorer 1958 ====
The Explorer featured sharp, angular lines and a large body, measuring nearly 63 cm (25 in) long. Its design exaggerated the treble side near the neck and the bass side near the bridge. While suitable for standing play, it could be cumbersome when seated.

It included three aligned controls: two for volume and one for tone. Sound was captured by two double-coil humbucker pickups, each with its own volume control. (Note: Early models had pickups labeled P.A.F. ("Patent Applied For"), as their patent was granted in 1959; see "Patent US-2,896,491" (PDF). U.S. Patent and Trademark Office. USA. July 28, 1959. Archived from the original (PDF) on January 19, 2012. A) A three-position toggle switch selected the neck pickup, bridge pickup, or both, with the tone control balancing the two when both were active. The string setup matched the Les Paul, using a Tune-O-Matic bridge. The fingerboard was rosewood with 22 frets and acrylic inlays. The output jack was on the body's side.

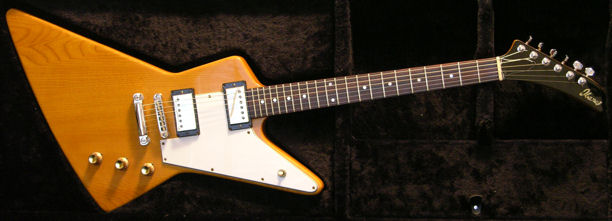
An Ibanez 2459 or "Korina Destroyer," nearly identical to the original Explorer. Note the headstock difference from the patented prototype.

A notable change from the Futura prototype was the headstock. The prototype had three tuning pegs on each side with a deeply cut headstock, typical of Gibson. The commercial version adopted a hockey-stick shape, with all pegs on one side, increasing string pressure on the nut for better sustain. This design influenced later competitors.

==== Gibson Flying V 1958 ====
The Flying V's arrow-like shape had a body narrowing to about 11 cm (4.3 in) near the neck and widening to 42 cm (16.5 in) at the bridge, with a total length of 1.5 m (59 in) and a 4 cm (1.6 in) thickness. While its shape aided access to higher frets, the initial prototype's rounded back and imbalance made it uncomfortable. The commercial version flattened the back and added a rubber strip to prevent wear when upright.

Its components and electronics mirrored the Explorer, with two differences: the output jack was on the body's front lower-right, mounted on a plastic piece, and the strings passed through the body via an arrow-shaped tailpiece, distinct from Gibson's standard. Catalog and trade show models appeared more like display pieces than functional instruments. The Flying V lacked an output jack, had a different pickguard, and included a neck support at the body junction. The catalog headstock featured a truss rod cover with Gibson's logo, which was omitted in production.

The Flying V's concept emerged playfully when McCarty suggested "cutting down" a bulky prototype, resulting in an arrow or "V" shape. A worker dubbed it "a flying vee," a pun on "V" and "flying bee. (Note: Seth Lover, inventor of P.A.F. pickups, claimed credit for the idea. Reference: Leonard, Michael (June 14, 2011). "The Gibson Flying V: 20 Essential Facts". Gibson Guitar Corporation. Nashville, TN, USA. Archived from the original on August 21, 2011.)

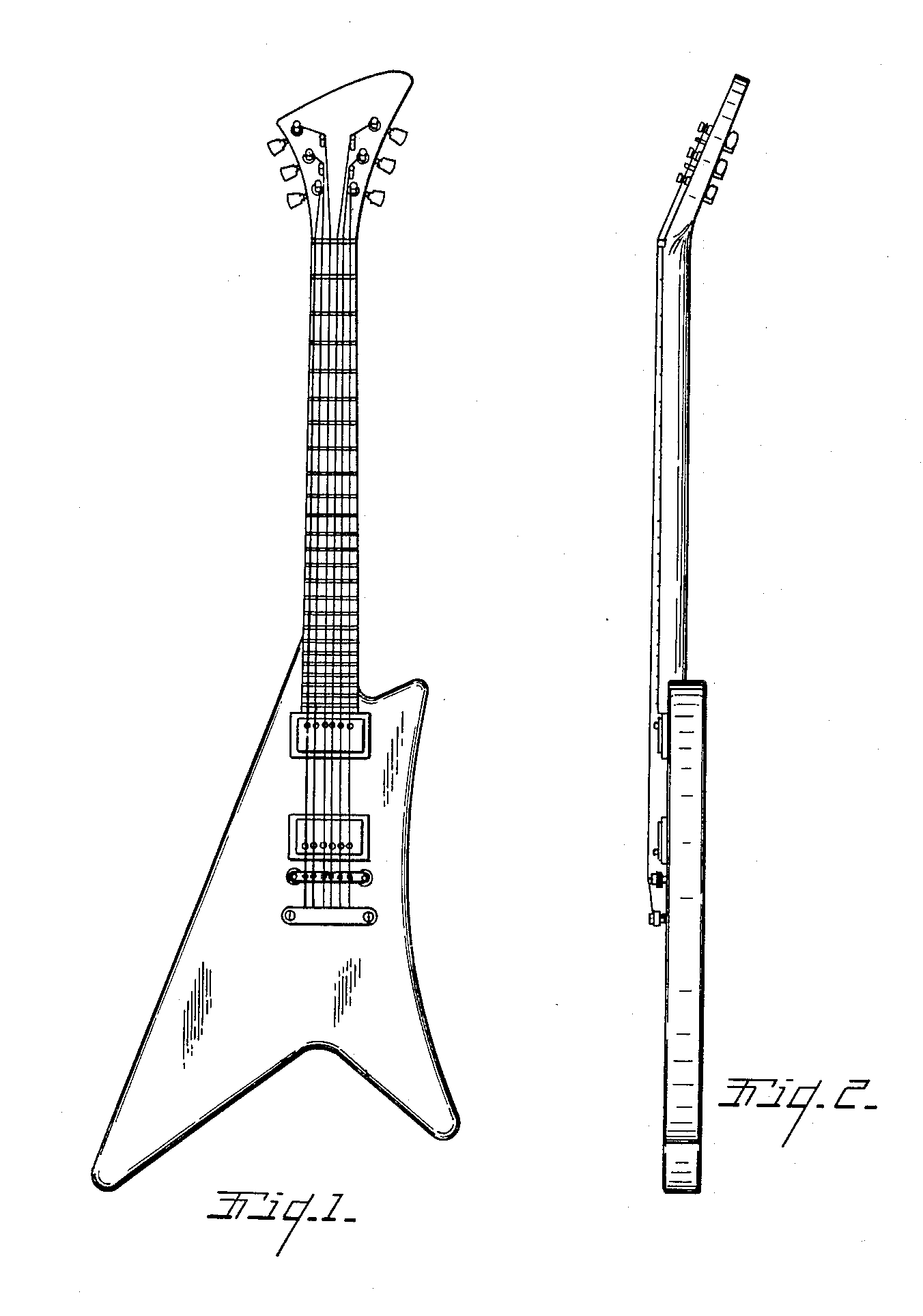
Patent drawing of the Gibson Moderne.

==== Gibson Moderne 1957 ====
The Moderne never reached the market, making it a legendary rarity in musical instrument collecting, often called the Holy Grail or Loch Ness Monster.

Its silhouette resembled the Flying V on the bass side and a hook on the treble side, inspired by the Streamline Moderne design style. The headstock was a triangular, paddle-like shape.

Details about its electronics are limited, but it likely had two pickups with volume and tone controls, similar to the Explorer and Flying V, based on patent designs.

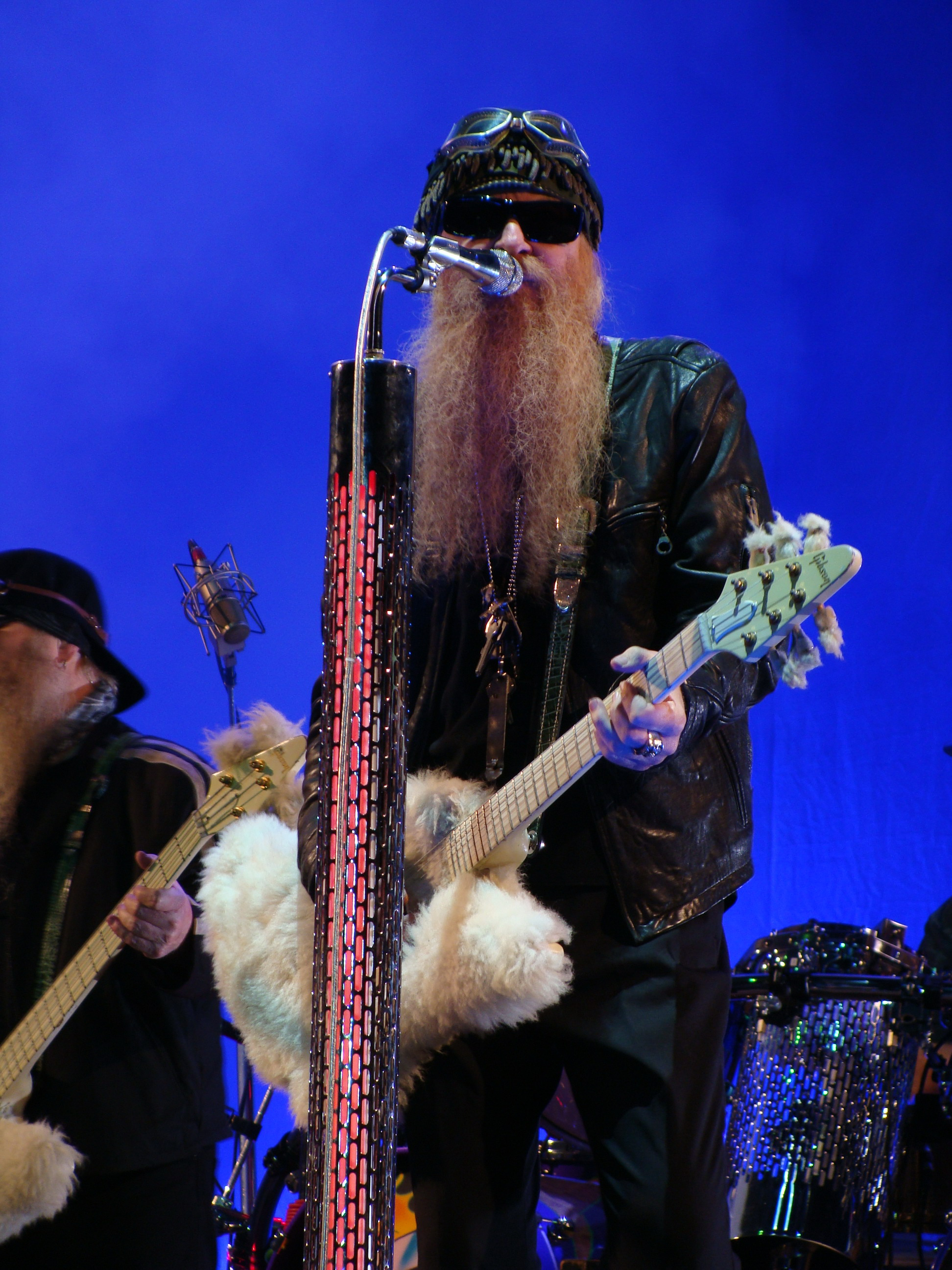
Billy Gibbons (ZZ Top) claims to own a Moderne. Pictured here with another Gibson model.

McCarty's claim that the Moderne was built and displayed is supported by Gibson's records, which note 12 units billed in 1958–1959. However, no original has been located, fueling skepticism.

Billy Gibbons of ZZ Top claims to own a Moderne, acquired second-hand in 2007 in San Antonio, Texas, reportedly salvaged from discarded items. (Note: During ZZ Top's 2010 tour. Reference: Di Perna, Alan; Gill, Chris; Bienstock, Richard (September 19, 2011). "Billy Gibbons". Guitar World. Future US.) He stated that luthier George Gruhn authenticated it, though Gruhn denies this. Other claims of Moderne ownership lack photographic evidence, and experts suggest these may be later replicas with original Gibson parts. An authentic Moderne could exceed $1 million in value.

=== Commercial failure and discontinuation ===
The Modernistic guitars failed to impress the music industry, which found them too radical, and they did not appeal to the public.

Russia has launched its satellite, perhaps to embarrass the United States; but the folks at Gibson have taken a step forward with their own 'first': the futuristic Flying V guitar.

— Gibson Gazette, November 1957

The Flying V and Explorer went on sale April 1, 1958, for $247.50, matching the Les Paul. Due to poor sales, they were discontinued in 1959. For example, only 81 Flying Vs were sold in 1958. Over time, they became some of the most valuable collector's items: in 2011, a Flying V fetched $200,000–$250,000, and an Explorer $250,000–$310,000, ranking fifth and fourth, respectively.

Gibson records indicate up to 40 Explorers and 120 Flying Vs were produced, with only 22 Explorers and 98 Flying Vs sold between 1958 and 1959. From 1960 to 1963, about twenty of each were sold using remaining stock. The Flying V was often purchased for store displays due to its striking appearance, as Gibson acknowledged. Excess korina was used for the Gibson Skylark, a lap-steel model.

The initial rejection stemmed from their avant-garde designs, deemed too radical for the era. Experts and enthusiasts agree the Gibson Modernistic series was ahead of its time.

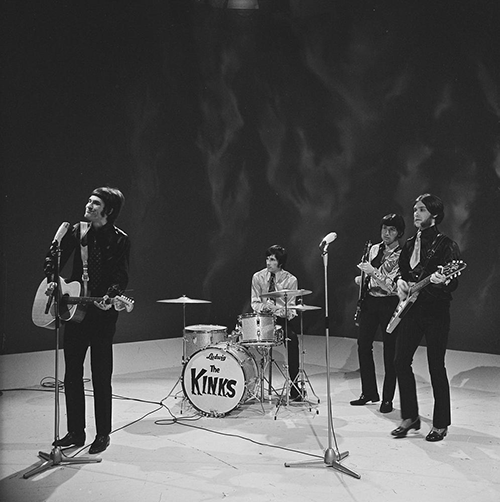
The Kinks on the TV program Fanclub, April 1967. Dave Davies plays a Flying V, also featured on the cover of Live at Kelvin Hall.

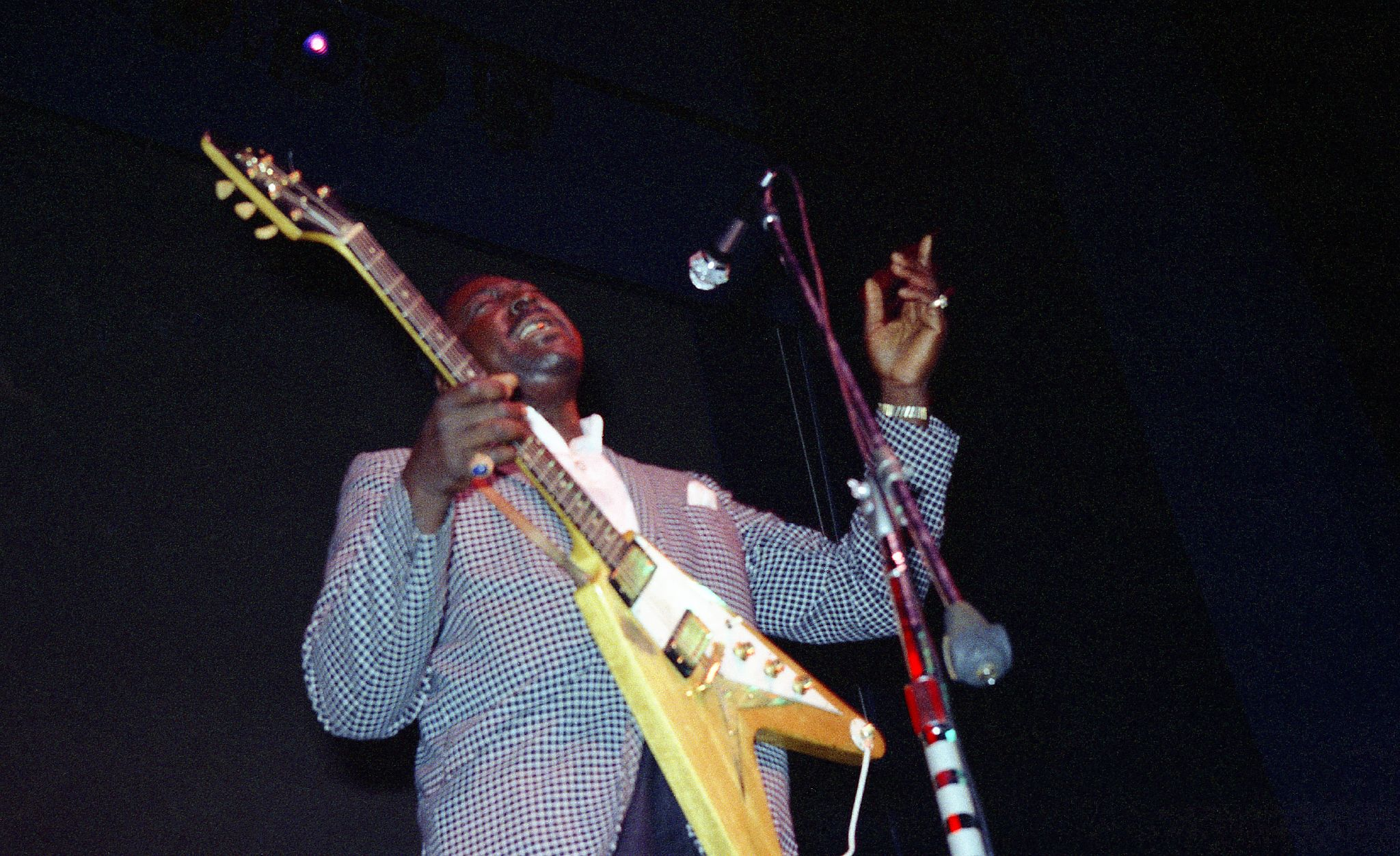
Albert King at Fillmore East (1968), with a Gibson Flying V.

After their commercial failure, the guitars were largely forgotten, with unsold stock languishing in Gibson's Kalamazoo warehouses into the 1960s. The Explorer inspired the Gibson Firebird in 1963, adopting its body and headstock design, though the Firebird's headstock faced upward.

The Flying V saw a revival in the late 1960s. Reintroduced in 1967, it featured changes: a Les Paul-style string setup, sometimes with a Vibrola tremolo, a wider pickguard with the output jack, and triangularly arranged controls.

American blues guitarists Lonnie Mack and Albert King popularized the Flying V, endorsing it publicly. (Note: King named his guitar "Lucy," and Mack called his "Seven." Mack's featured a Bigsby vibrato bridge, making it distinctive) In pop music, British Invasion band The Kinks' guitarist Dave Davies used a 1958 Flying V, purchased at a discount in 1964 from a dusty Los Angeles shop. (Note: Davies claims he bought his Flying V in 1964 at a bargain price, found neglected in a Los Angeles instrument store (Fjestad, 2007, p. 8)) In rock music, Jimi Hendrix boosted its fame starting in 1969. Though associated with the Fender Stratocaster, Hendrix, a left-handed guitarist like King, acquired two 1967 Flying Vs with tremolo arms and commissioned a custom model (serial number 849476) for the 1970 Isle of Wight Festival. Hendrix admired King's bending technique, pushing strings downward, and sought to replicate his sound. (Note: Both Albert King and Jimi Hendrix, though left-handed, used right-handed models. Hendrix reversed the string order on his "Flying Angel" and other guitars to place higher strings lower. King kept the original stringing on "Lucy" (Fjestad, 2007, p. 11).)

== See also ==
- Gibson
- Gibson Explorer
- Gibson Flying V
- Gibson Moderne

== Notes ==
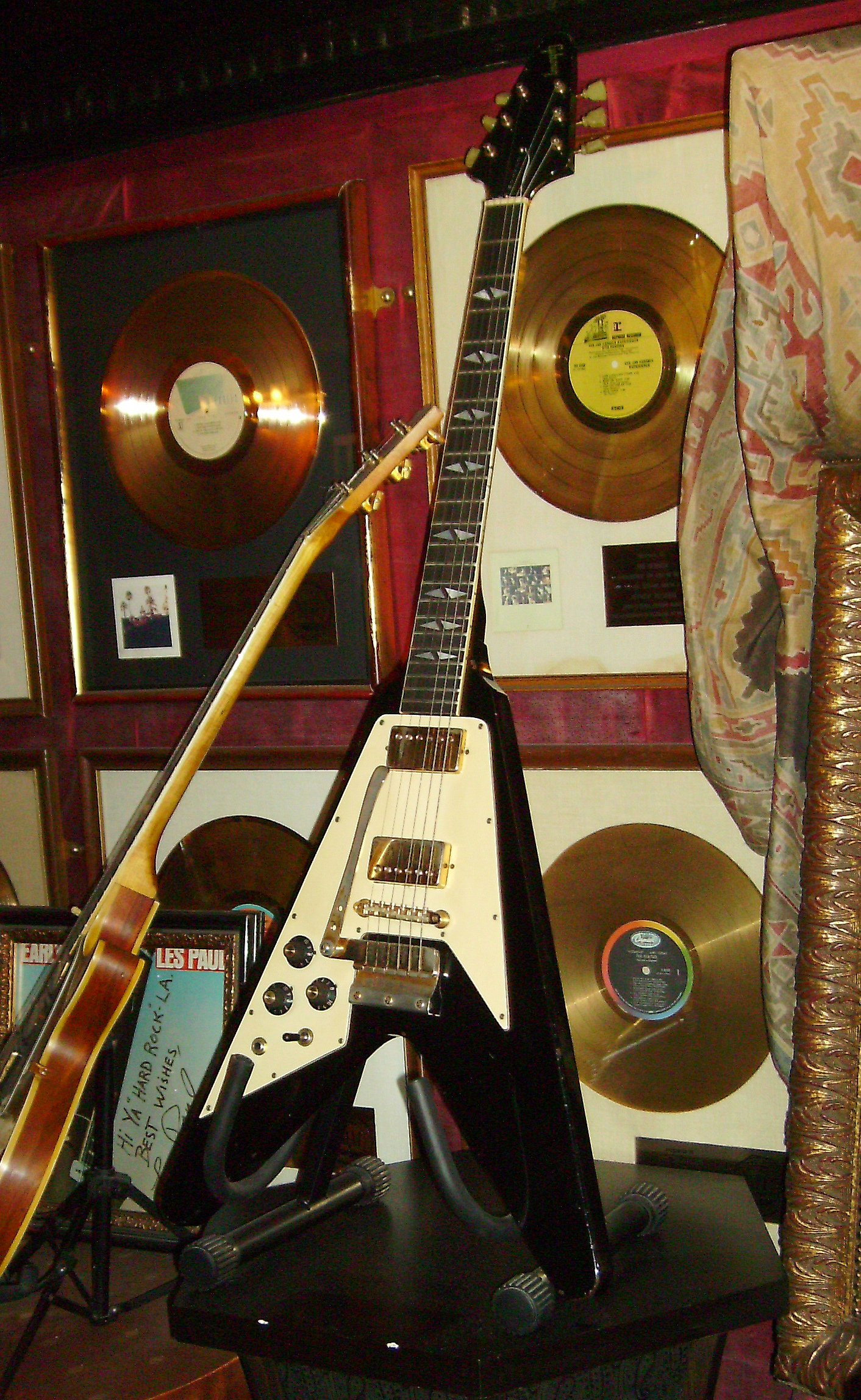
Jimi Hendrix's "Flying Angel" Flying V, custom-built in 1969 (displayed at the Hard Rock Cafe in London).

== Bibliography ==
- Bacon, Tony (2011). Flying V, Explorer, Firebird: An Odd-Shaped History of Gibson's Weird Electric Guitars. Australia: Hal Leonard. ISBN 978-1617130083.
- Duchossoir, Andre R. (June 1, 1998). "9. The Modernistic Guitars. 1957-1959". Gibson Electrics: The Classic Years: An Illustrated History from the Mid-'30s to the Early '60s. Musical Instruments Series: Guitars-Manufacturer Specific. Milwaukee, USA: Hal Leonard. pp. 69–75. ISBN 0-7935-9210-0.
- Fjestad, Zachary R. (September 7, 2007). Meiners, Larry (ed.). Gibson Flying V. Blue Book Publications. ISBN 978-1886768727.
- Meiners, Larry (2002). Flying "V": The Illustrated History of This Modernistic Guitar. Billy F. Gibbons. Flying Vintage. ISBN 978-0970827333.
- Seguret, Christian (1999). "Regreso al futuro". El mundo de las guitarras [L'univers des Guitares]. Translated by Prat Clarós, Luis. San Adrián del Besós, Barcelona, Spain: Ultramar Ediciones. pp. 120–123. ISBN 978-84-7386-968-3.
- Wheeler, Tom (1991). American Guitars: An Illustrated History. Les Paul (Foreword). Harper & Row. ISBN 978-0062730961.
- Wood, Ronald L. (December 1, 2008). Moderne: The Holy Grail of Vintage Guitars. USA: Centerstream. ISBN 978-1574242416.
