= Gibson Corvus =

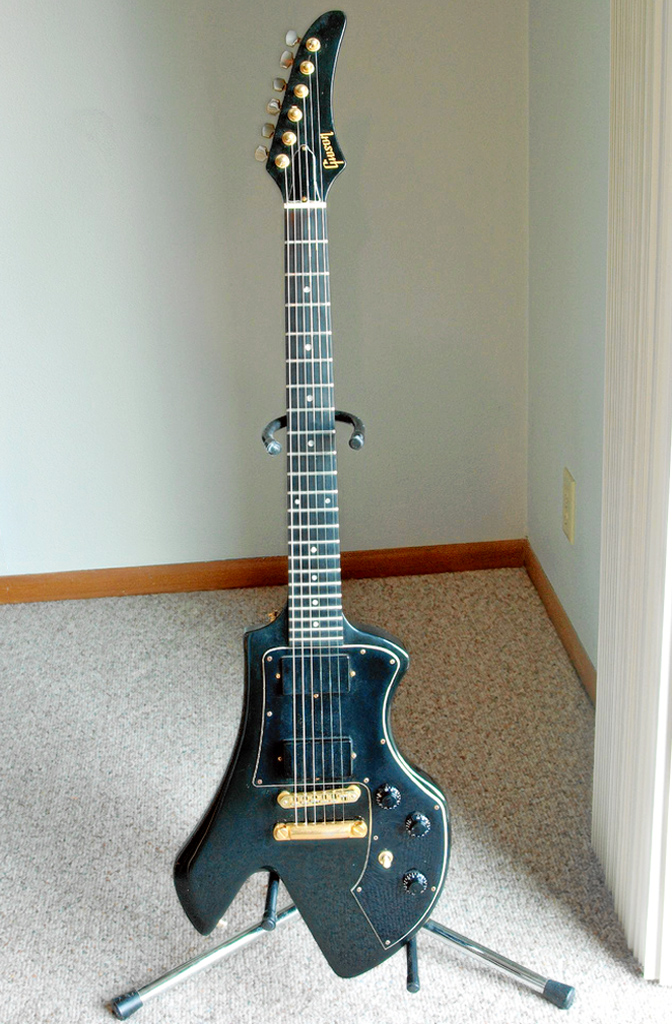
- A Corvus II model.
- Manufacturer: Gibson
- Period: 1982–1984

Construction
- Body type: Solid
- Neck joint: Bolt-on

Woods
- Body: Alder
- Neck: Maple
- Fretboard: Rosewood

Hardware
- Bridge: Fixed
- Pickup: 1 or 2 Alnico V humbuckers or 3 single-coils

Colors available
- Silver, yellow, orange, others

The Gibson Corvus was a short-lived series of solid body electric guitars produced by the Gibson Guitar Corporation in the mid-1980s.

== Prototype ==
During its prototype stage, bearing the name "Futura", it was initially designed as a headless guitar with tuners located at the offset V-cut at the body, as well as a reduced headstock. The compact headless design was rejected in favor of traditional headstocks, and the prototype remained in the Gibson Vault until 2023.

== Production ==
The production model featured a solid body with an offset V-cut at the tail, which led it to be colloquially known as the "can opener" guitar. If the guitar is turned sideways, it supposedly looks as if it is the shape of a crow in flight. Corvus is the Latin word for crow. The guitar appeared in Gibson's 1982 American Series catalog as "an instrument with a look as daring as it sounds".

The Corvus was poorly received, and remained in production for only two years. The guitar would later be considered somewhat of a "cult" guitar, appearing in the Guitar Hero video game series.

The Corvus was sold in three model variations:

- Corvus I - one Alnico V humbucker pick-up, volume, and tone knob.
- Corvus II - two Alnico V humbuckers, volume, and tone knobs.
- Corvus III - three single-coil pick-ups, a five-way switch, one volume, and one tone knob.

An upscale Corvus with a set rather than bolt-on neck was marketed under the name "Futura" (not to be confused with the Explorer prototype).

The Corvus was one of several new models designed to renew interest in Gibson guitars. It was discontinued after two years due to poor sales.

Notable Players:

- Jet Piston - Rifle
- Tim Kasher - Cursive

The Corvus is featured in the video games Guitar Hero, Guitar Hero II and Guitar Hero III and in the bar band scene of the movie The Adventures of Buckaroo Banzai.
