= Gibson Moderne =

Electric guitar

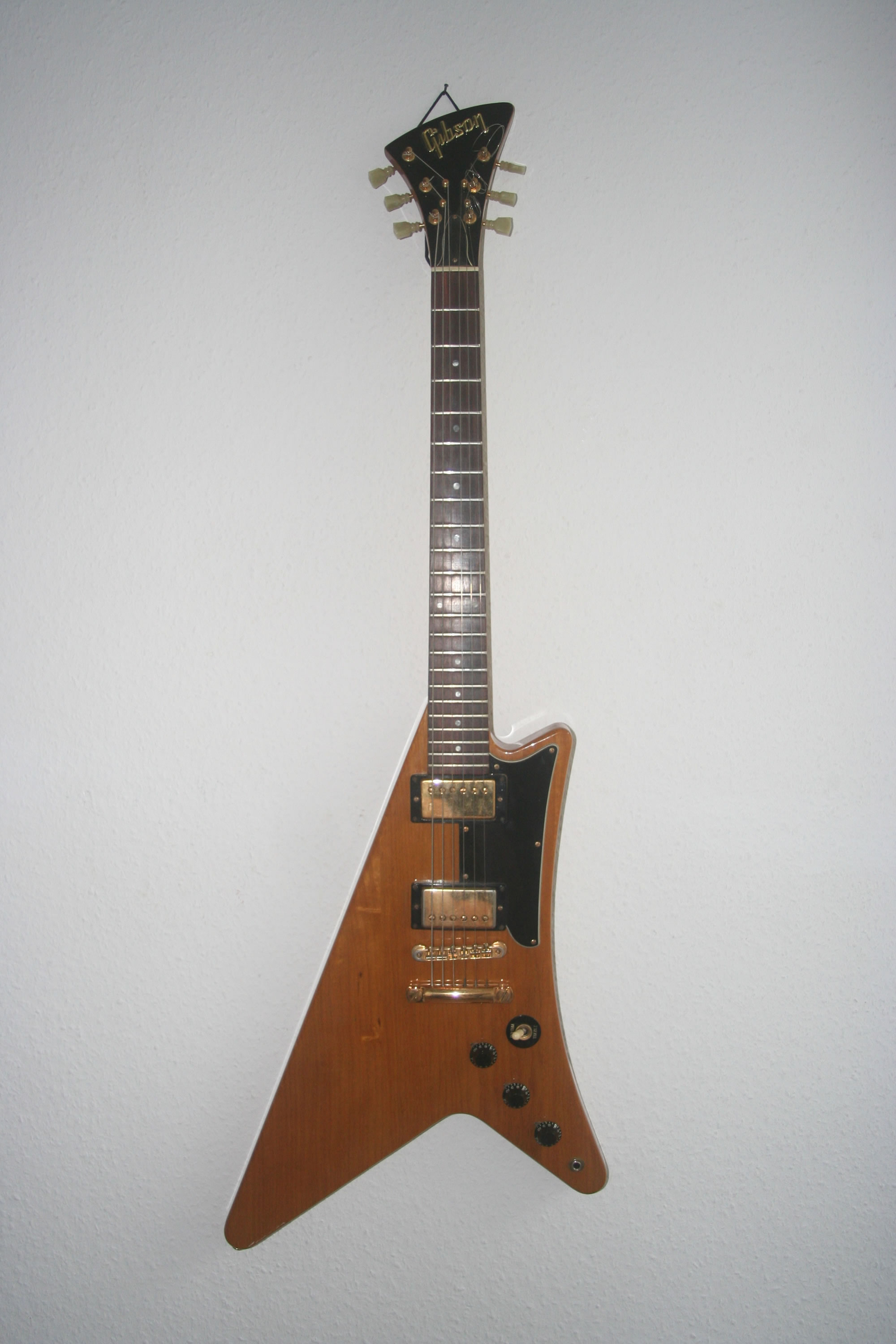
- Manufacturer: Gibson
- Period: 1957; 1982–83; 2012–present

Construction
- Body type: Solid
- Neck joint: Set-in

Woods
- Body: Korina; Mahogany; Poplar
- Neck: Mahogany
- Fretboard: Rosewood; Ebony

Hardware
- Bridge: Tune-o-matic
- Pickup: 2 Humbuckers

The Gibson Moderne is an electric guitar model prototyped by Gibson in 1957. It was designed alongside the Flying V and Explorer as part of a stylistically advanced line of electric guitars. However, unlike the Flying V and Explorer, the Moderne was not put into production until 1982.

Because few prototypes were made in the 1950s, and no authenticated example is currently known, the hypothetical 1958 Moderne has been called the "mythical great white whale" or "holy grail" of collectible guitars.

== History ==
By the mid-1950s Gibson Guitar Company had lost considerable market share to rival Fender's Telecaster and Stratocaster models and created three modernistic solid-body guitar concepts in an attempt to strike back. On June 27, 1957, Gibson President Ted McCarty filed three designs with the United States Patent Office which would come to be called "Flying V", "Explorer", and (unofficially, by later historians) "Moderne". The design patents were issued on January 7, 1958; however, after getting an exceedingly poor reception at the 1957 NAMM Convention, Gibson decided not to produce the Moderne. There is only a vague mention of "Mod. Guitars" on a shipping list, which some argue applies to Explorers. Gibson engineer Rendall Wall (and later co-founder of Heritage Guitars) played it in the early 1960s for a local performance of Bye Bye Birdie. Wall recounted that he got it out of Gibson's "morgue", and that he could have bought it for $50: it was so ugly that nobody wanted it. He returned it after the show, saying he was more a country player than a rock and roll player.

Some Gibson employees said that no prototypes were ever made, others, including Ted McCarty, say that a few were made, but nobody knows where they went. Some Gibson employees from that time also say that two men took parts being used to make the Moderne prototypes and assembled some outside the factory.

They were "re"-issued by Gibson in 1980 at the NAMM show in Atlanta as part of the "Heritage Series" and later produced in Korea by Epiphone.

Stylistically, Modernes are characterized by an elongated lower bass bout (similar to the Flying V), a scooped-out treble bout (similar to a shark fin), an oblong headstock (similar to Gumby's head) with inverted tuners, and gold hardware: the usual Gibson combination of two humbuckers, adjustable Tune-o-Matic bridge and stop tailpiece. Like its Modernistic siblings but unlike most 2-pickup Gibsons, the Moderne has a single master tone control rather than separate neck and bridge knobs.

Because of their very limited production and forward design, Modernes are highly sought by collectors. However, in 2012, Gibson re-released the Moderne as a part of their production line.

In 2013 Gibson introduced a Zakk Wylde signature model. The "Moderne of Doom" features a pinstripe design that is typical of Zakk Wylde's signature guitars.

== See also ==
- Gibson Flying V
- Gibson Explorer
- Gibson Modernistic Series
