= Gibson Futura =

Electric guitar prototype

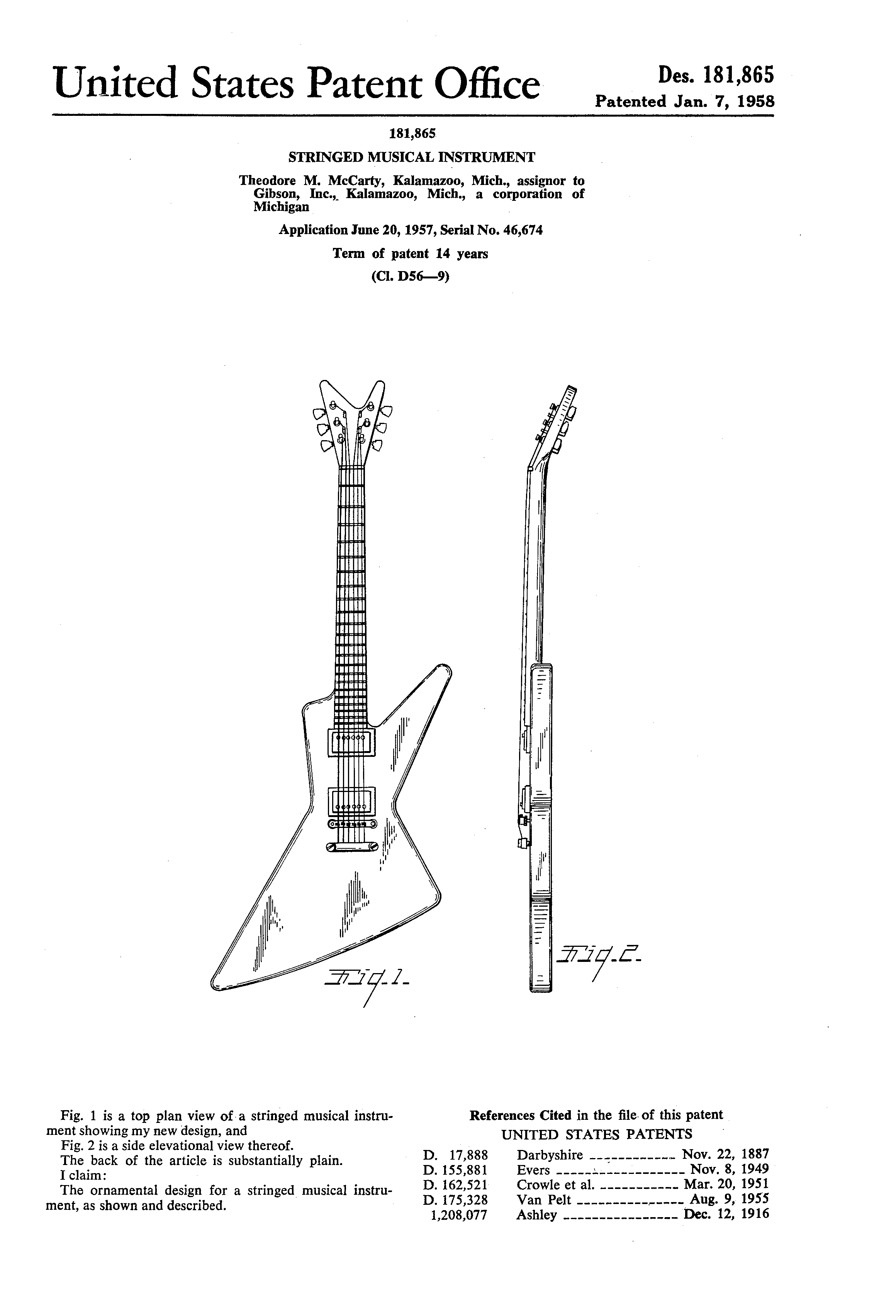
- Manufacturer: Gibson
- Period: 1957, 1996–2008

Construction
- Body type: Solid
- Neck joint: Set
- Scale: 24.75 in (629 mm)

Woods
- Body: Mahogany, Korina
- Neck: Mahogany, Korina
- Fretboard: Rosewood

Hardware
- Bridge: Tune-o-matic
- Pickup: 2 Humbuckers

The Gibson Futura was an electric guitar that was the precursor of the model introduced as the Explorer. These prototypes, christened "Futura" many years later, resembled the eventual Explorer design, but had a differently-proportioned body, as well as a 'split' or 'forked' headstock that survived into the first few production Explorers but was quickly replaced. Gibson obtained U.S. Design Patent number 181,865 for the Futura body shape.

== Original design ==
Gibson's designers made very few, perhaps four to six, of these prototypes between 1957 and early 1958, using patternmakers' mahogany at first and then korina (limba). One of these, a mockup without electronics, was photographed at the July 1957 NAMM trade show. A few prototypes were later acquired by the public.

== Explorer production ==
When Explorer production began, with the final, wider body shape in "korina" or African limba wood, a few very early examples retained the "split-V" headstock. (Note: It is also possible that these were late prototypes that Gibson later serialized and sold, a standard practice at the time) One of those "transitional" models is today owned by Rick Nielsen. The Explorer offered a radical, body design and golden-blonde korina, much like its sibling, the Flying V. Its initial run was unsuccessful and it was discontinued in 1959 after shipping fewer than 50; a few leftover bodies were fitted with nickel hardware and shipped in 1963. The Gibson Explorer was reintroduced in the 1970s and is still sold today.

== Development ==
In 1996 Gibson brought out as a limited edition the "1957 Futura Korina Reissue," a misnomer since the unnamed initial design had never been released. Gibson's Custom Shop has occasionally produced Futuras. Epiphone added two versions of the Futura to its higher-end "Prophecy" series of guitars, with ebony black finish with matching hardware.

== Corvus prototype ==
During 1981, Gibson attempt to enter the headless guitar market, and a prototype bearing the name "Futura" was made by Gibson’s Kalamazoo R&D team, and sent for approval to the marketing team in Nashville. This Futura's body shape was nothing like the Explorer or its prototype, but instead has a "can-opener" body, with its tuners were located at the offset V-cut at the body, and has a reduced headstock The compact headless design was rejected in favor of Futura and Corvus™ models with traditional headstocks, and the prototype has remained in the Gibson vault until 2023. The project itself was modified into Gibson Corvus with traditional headstock.
