= Ted McCarty =

American businessman

Theodore McCarty (October 10, 1909 – April 1, 2001) was an American businessman who worked with the Wurlitzer Company and the Gibson Guitar Corporation. In 1966, he and Gibson Vice President John Huis bought the Bigsby Electric Guitar Company. At Gibson he was involved in many guitar innovations and designs between 1950 and 1966.

== Early life ==
Born in Somerset, Kentucky in 1909, McCarty earned a degree in engineering from the University of Cincinnati.

== Career ==
McCarty joined the Wurlitzer Company in 1936 stayed with them until 1948 when he was hired by Gibson. Brach's Candy also wanted to hire him.

McCarty was named vice president of the Gibson Guitar Corporation in 1949, then president in 1950. He remained president until 1966. This period became known as Gibson's golden age of electric guitars.

The Gibson Les Paul was designed during his time with the company. McCarty sought to create a hybrid design that would combine the sustain of a solid-body electric guitar with the warmth of a hollow-body guitar. The ES-335 was created as a semi-hollow with a central block running the length of the guitar and hollow wings. McCarty was also responsible for the development of the Tune-o-matic bridge system, the humbucking pickup, and the Explorer, Flying V, Moderne, SG and Firebird guitars. Like Leo Fender, McCarty never played the guitar. He instead spoke with every guitarist he could in order to find out what guitar players were interested in.

In addition to his numerous inventions, he also is responsible for increasing Gibson's production from 5,000 guitars a year to more than 100,000. This increase in production allowed Gibson to grow from 150 employees to over 1,200 employees during McCarty's 18-year span as president. In 1966, McCarty retired from Gibson and became president of Bigsby Electric Guitars.

In April 2000 McCarty became the first person interviewed for the NAMM Oral History Program, a video collection of interviews with pioneers of the music industry.

== Death ==
McCarty died in April 2001, at the age of 91.

== Paul Reed Smith ==
McCarty became the mentor of Paul Reed Smith. Smith found out about McCarty during a visit to the US Patent office in the early 1980s, where he kept noticing McCarty's name among Gibson's patents. Smith later hired McCarty as a consultant, and credits his experience with McCarty as a defining moment in his company.

=== PRS McCarty ===
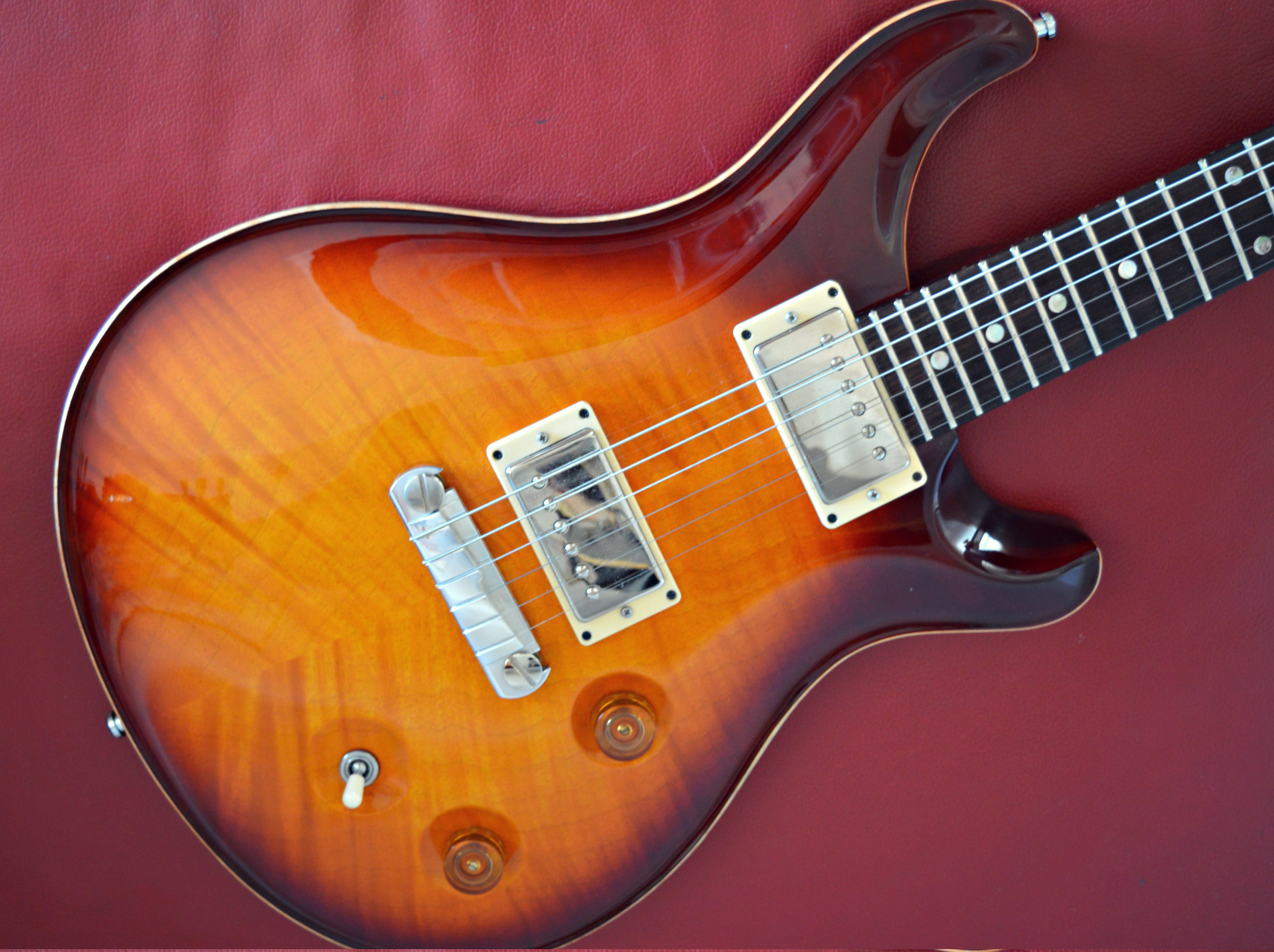
2010 PRS McCarty

In 1994, Paul Reed Smith's company PRS Guitars, launched the McCarty model as a tribute to McCarty. Previously, no instrument or company ever bore his name. The McCarty model has since remained a staple of the PRS Guitars lineup.

== Gibson Theodore ==
A freehand sketch of a guitar based on the musical style of Les Paul was approved by Theodore McCarty in 1993 to certify a young luthier, and was manufactured into a real instrument in 2022 by the Gibson Custom Shop. The Theodore is an electric guitar made by Gibson. According to the Gibson website, only 318 "Theodore" Custom guitars have been made. The guitar features 2 P-90 Pickups and 2 tone and volume knobs. Its headstock design is very similar to the Gibson Explorer's headstock.

In September 2022, PRS Guitars and McCarty's estate petitioned to cancel the "Theodore" trademark, citing that Gibson does not have the right to use his name or public persona, and that PRS Guitars already holds an existing trademark for the "McCarty" guitar. The petition was dropped in 2024.

The guitar was later reissued in 2024 by the Gibson USA main line.
