= ESP EX =

Series of ESP electric guitars

The ESP EX is a series of electric guitars produced by ESP produced in the United States, Europe and in Japan with the ESP logo as part of the ESP Original Series.

Notable users of models in the EX Series include Patrik Jensen and Anders Björler of The Haunted, Peter Tagtgren of Hypocrisy, Seth of Behemoth, Devin Townsend and Jed Simon of Strapping Young Lad, Chris McCarthy of Internal Bleeding, Wayne Static of Static-X, Dan Jacobs of Atreyu, Silenoz of Dimmu Borgir, and Jesper Strömblad of In Flames.

ESP began the EX Series with models such as the EX-100 and the EX-102 among others. In 2000 there was an EX-350 that was a set neck with a Floyd Rose and 2 humbuckers, it was only available in oxblood red. In 2003, those models were discontinued and the EX-351 and EX-50 were introduced. The EX-351 was discontinued in 2004 when the EX-400, EX-400BD, and the EX-260 were introduced. The EX-400BD was discontinued in 2007, therefore the EX-400, EX-260, and EX-50 are the only EX models currently produced by ESP in the LTD production line. The discontinued models are still sold online or in some guitar shops that still have them in stock.

== History ==
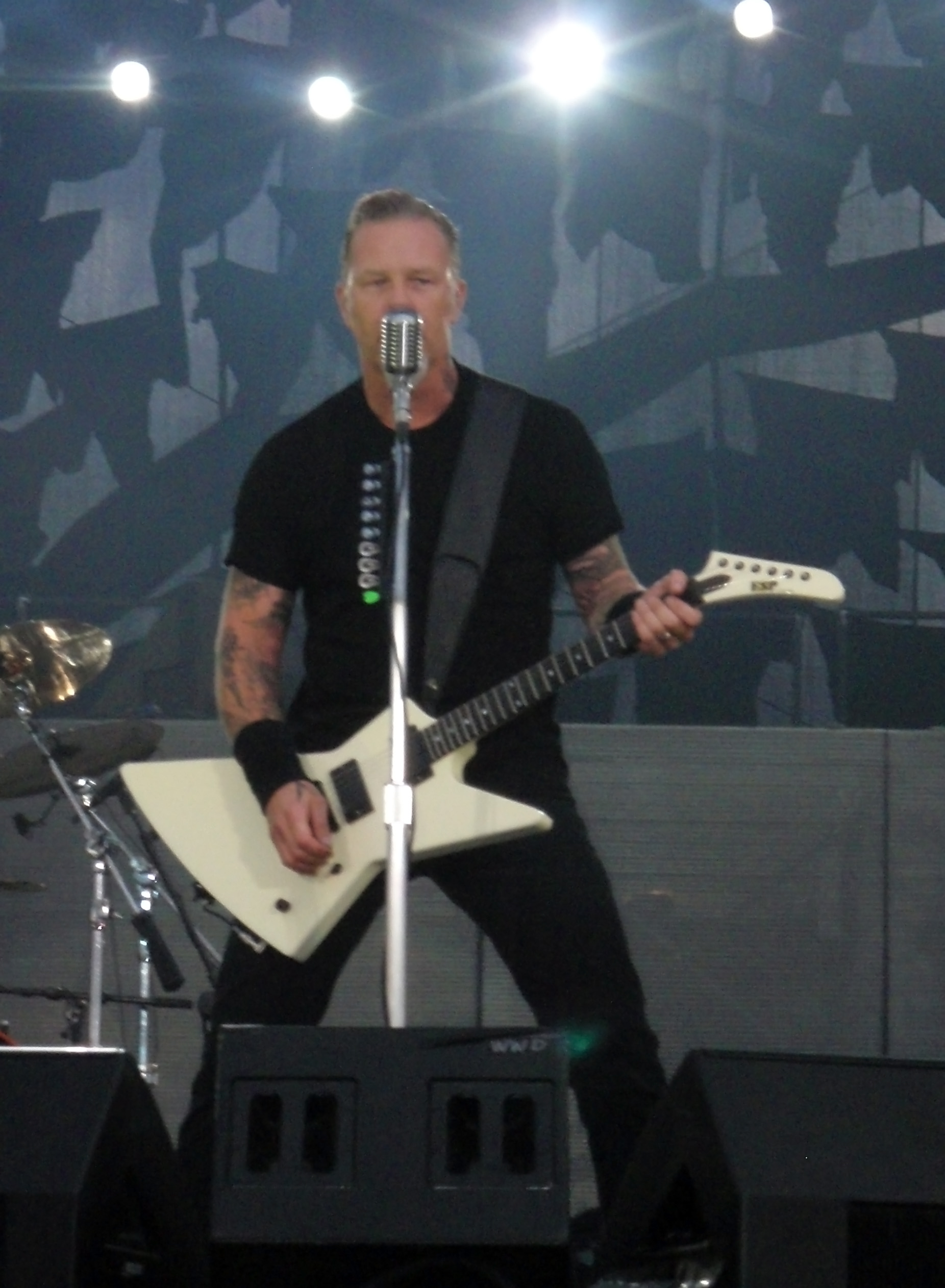
James Hetfield of Metallica playing an ESP EXP guitar, with a design similar to that of Gibson Explorer

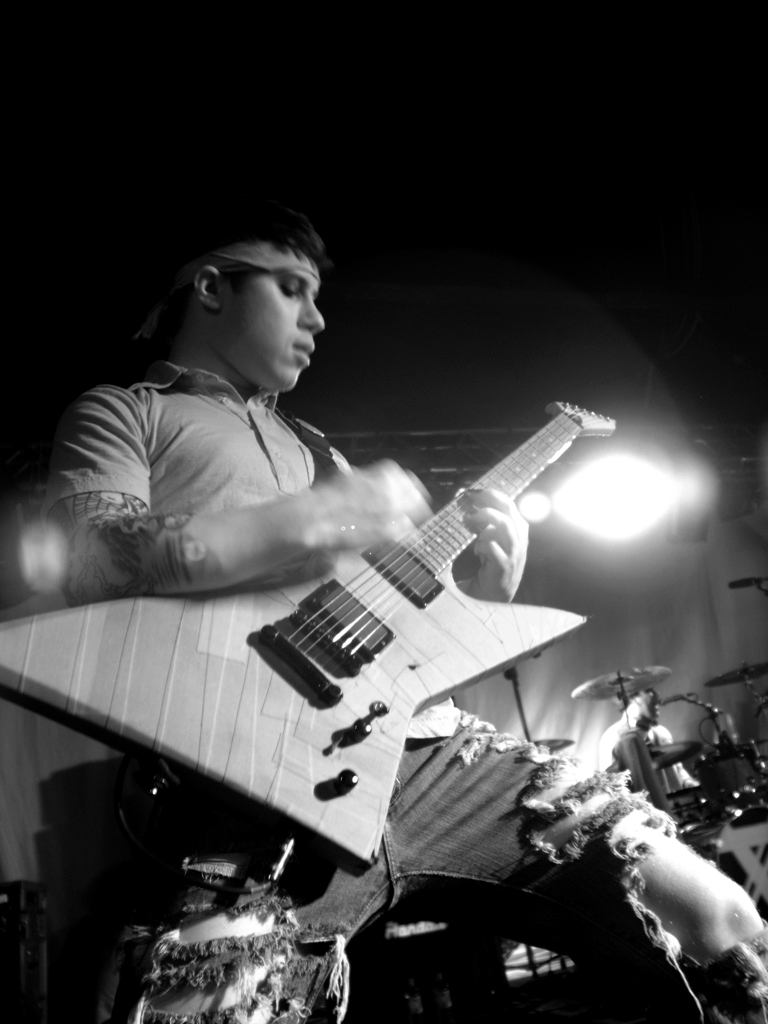
Dan Jacobs of Atreyu playing an ESP EX guitar, with sharp edges

The EX series began as the MX Series in the mid to late 1980s, firstly producing a MX 220 based on a 1970s Gibson Explorer Body with the ‘famed’ banana headstock, then later with the MX 250 model (as shown in the pic above) with a smaller headstock and a 1980s Gibson body shape. Towards the late 1990s the range was renamed as EXP series (often simply called the ESP Explorer), which featured a design exactly like the Gibson Explorer, down to the same rounded body edges and headstock shape; the only differences being EMG pickups, two control knobs (versus the three on Gibson Explorers) and the ESP logo on the headstock. Soon after Gibson's decision to sue ESP, ESP discontinued the EXP series for international markets and began production of the current EX series, featuring a different design with more pointed edges and the usual ESP headstock shape, to avoid any lawsuit.

Metallica's James Hetfield is probably the most renowned user of the MX series, which he has been using since the late 1980s. He further popularized the series with his legendary "EET FUK" MX 220 and his custom ESP JH-2, a black MX 250 with diamond plating. Hetfield's equipment includes many custom made guitars that closely resemble the original EXP guitars in looks as well as specifications. The most recent example (though with a few alterations to body and headstock design) is the ESP JH Snakebyte, which has been available to the public – along with a lower-priced LTD model – since the summer of 2011.

== ESP EX ==
This is ESPs standard EX series guitar. This is very similar to the ESP LTD 401DX with the only major differences being that it is made in Japan, has Gotoh bridge and tuners as opposed to ESP bridge and Grover tuners and has a bone nut.

Other specifications :

- Body Wood: Mahogany
- Neck Wood: 3-piece Maple
- Fingerboard Wood: Rosewood
- Pickups: EMG 81 (Bridge)/EMG 60 (Neck)
- Bridge: Gotoh TOM with tailpiece
- Nut: 42mm Bone

== ESP LTD EX-401DX ==
This is ESPs latest addition to the EX LTD line-up. It has exactly the same spec as the original EX-400 but it now has a Floyd Rose Special tremolo. It is also only available in a black flamed-maple top which was usually never used on the EX series. The inlay was also changed to an arrow shape as opposed to dots.

Other specifications :

- Body Wood: Mahogany
- Neck Wood: 3-piece Maple
- Fingerboard Wood: Rosewood
- Pickups: EMG 81 (Bridge)/EMG 60 (Neck)
- Bridge: Floyd Rose Special
- Nut: 42mm Floyd Rose Locking Nut

== ESP LTD EX-400 ==
The EX-400 features set-in neck construction in a 24.75" scale. The fingerboard features dot inlays with the model name at the 12th fret. It has 22 extra jumbo frets and an Earvana compensated nut. It comes in black and olympic white. The Black with black diamond plate and black hardware was discontinued in 2006 due to the introduction of the Wayne Static Model, which has a chrome diamond plate on top of black finish. In 2007 came the diamond plate in a metallic chrome color. LTD EX-400bd Chrome-color is the latest Explorer from ESP. The tuning pegs are Grover tuners. It has one volume and one tone control knob and a 3-way toggle. NOTE: It was deemed discontinued in the 2007 catalogue, but quickly returned due to mass demand. In 2009, the ESP LTD EX 400 was discontinued, and the ESP LTD EX 401, and ESP LTD EX 401DX took its place as the premium ESP EX series guitar.

Other specifications :

- Body Wood: Mahogany
- Neck Wood: 3-piece Maple
- Fingerboard Wood: Rosewood
- Pickups: EMG 81 (Bridge)/EMG 60 (Neck)
- Bridge: Tune-O-Matic with Stop Tailpiece

== ESP LTD EX-360 ==
The EX-360 has a set-in neck, 24.75" scale. The fingerboard features dot inlays with the model name at the 12th fret. It also has 22 extra jumbo frets. It comes in black, metallic blue, and white with black hardware. It has one volume and one tone control knob with a 3-way toggle. NOTE: This guitar is now discontinued.

Other specifications :

- Body Wood: Mahogany
- Neck Wood: 3-piece Maple
- Fingerboard Wood: Rosewood
- Pickups: EMG 81 (Bridge)/EMG 60 (Neck)
- Bridge: Floyd Rose with locking nut

== ESP LTD EX-260 ==
The EX-260 features set-in neck construction in a 24.75" scale. The fingerboard features dot inlays with the model name at the 12th fret. It has 22 extra jumbo frets. It comes in black with black hardware. It has one volume and one tone control knob with a 3-way toggle. The tone control knob has a coil tap switch that is actuated by pulling up on the knob and thus turning the humbuckers into single coil pickups.

Other specifications :

- Body Wood: Agathis
- Neck Wood: 3-piece Maple
- Fingerboard Wood: Rosewood
- Pickups: 2 EMG-ESP LH-300
- Bridge: Tune-O-Matic with Stop Tailpiece

== ESP LTD EX-50 ==
The EX-50 features bolt-on neck construction in a 24.75" scale. The fingerboard features dot inlays with the model name at the 12th fret. It has 22 extra jumbo frets. It comes in silver with black hardware, or black with silver hardware. It has one volume and one tone control knob with a 3-way toggle.

Other specifications :

- Body Wood: Basswood
- Neck Wood: Maple
- Fingerboard Wood: Rosewood
- Pickups: 2 ESP LH-150
- Bridge: Tune-O-Matic with Stop Tailpiece

== ESP EX-280 ==
The EX-280 (only available in Japan), features set-in neck construction in a 24.75" scale. The fingerboard features dot inlays, with two regular dot inlays on the 12th fret. It has 22 extra jumbo frets, and a carbon nut. It comes in black with black hardware. It has two volume knobs, 1 for neck pickup and 1 for the bridge pickup, and a mini toggle PU selector.

Other specifications :

- Body Wood: Mahogany
- Neck Wood: 3-piece Maple
- Fingerboard Wood: Ebony
- Pickups: 2 EMG 81's, on Neck and Bridge.
- Bridge: Tune-O-Matic with Stop Tailpiece

=== Syu Custom ===
The custom EX-280, used by Syu of Galneryus, features characteristics similar to that of a standard EX-280, except that it has a bone nut, two EMG 89 pickups and a coil split switch.
