= Gibson Thunderbird =

Electric bass guitar

Thunderbird bass
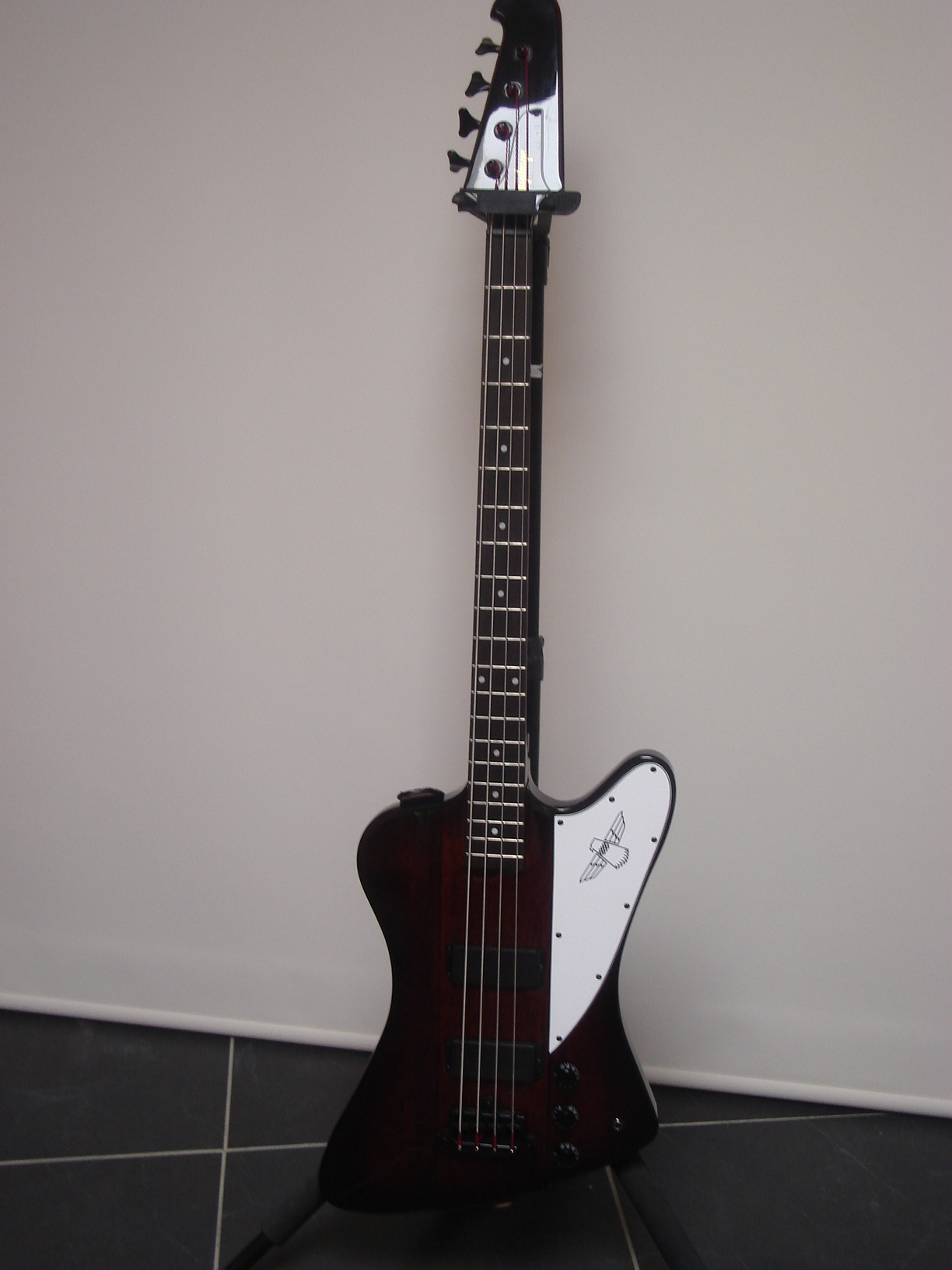
- An Epiphone Thunderbird in Tobacco Sunburst.
- Manufacturer: Gibson
- Period: 1963–1969, 1976–1979, 1987–present

Construction
- Body type: Solid
- Neck joint: Neck-through
- Scale: 34 in

Woods
- Body: Mahogany and walnut
- Neck: Mahogany and walnut
- Fretboard: Rosewood or ebony

Hardware
- Bridge: Fixed
- Pickup: Bass humbuckers

Colors available
- Tobacco burst or alpine white, ebony and metallic red, Pelham blue in limited edition models

The Gibson Thunderbird is an electric bass guitar made by Gibson and Epiphone.

== Background and introduction ==
The Gibson Thunderbird was introduced in 1963. At the time, Fender had been the leader in the electric bass market since their introduction of the Precision Bass twelve years earlier.

The Thunderbird was designed by U.S. auto designer Raymond H. Dietrich (Chrysler, Lincoln, Checker) along with the Firebird guitar, which it resembles in design, construction, and name.

== Design and construction ==
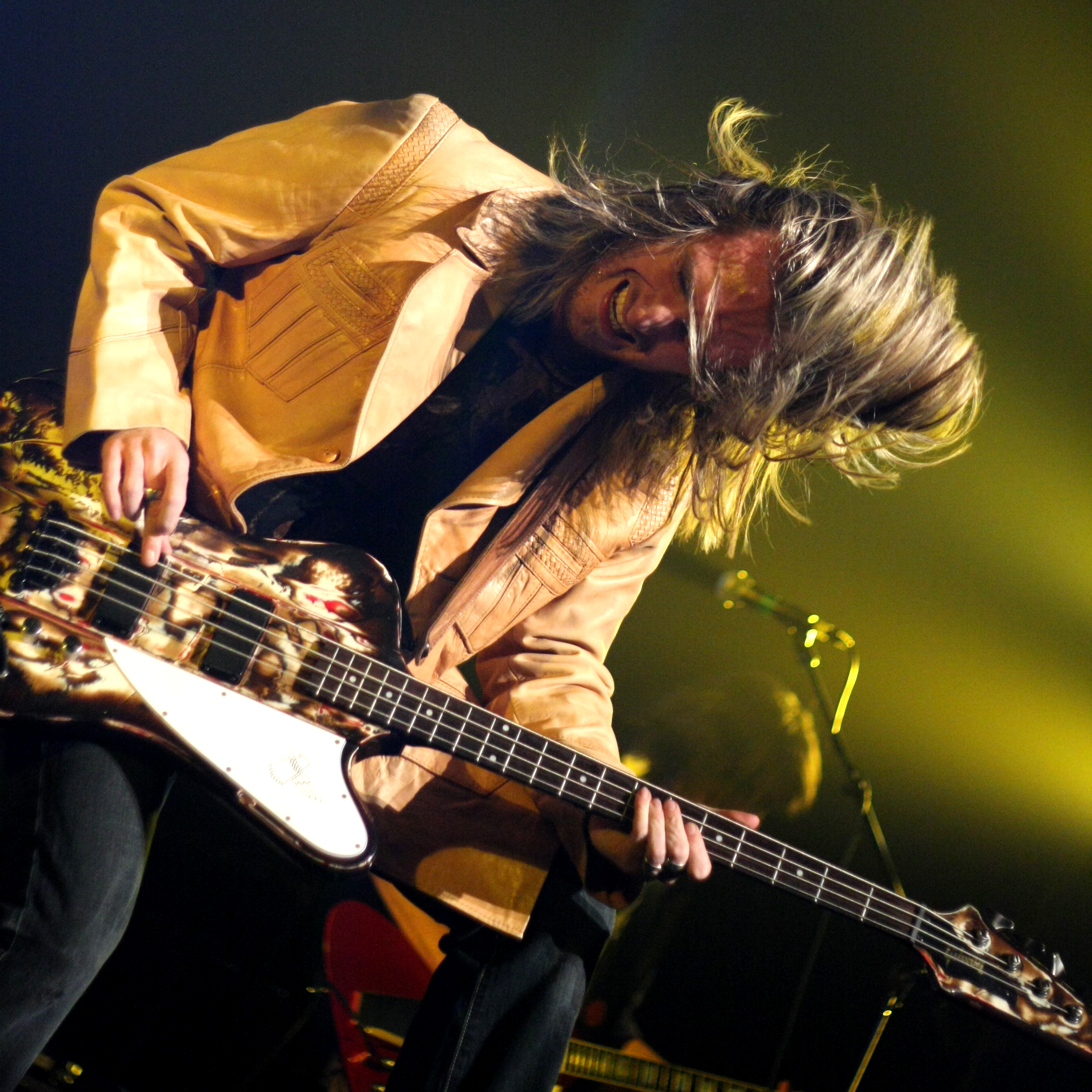
Josh Reedy of DecembeRadio playing a custom Gibson Thunderbird onstage

The Thunderbird bass, like the Rickenbacker 4000 series and the Firebird guitar designed concurrently, has neck-through construction: the neck wood runs the entire length of the body, with the rest of the body glued into place. Some less expensive Epiphone models feature a more conventional bolt-on neck construction.

The Thunderbird was Gibson's first model built in the 34-inch scale, which had been made popular by Fender. Previous models use the short scale of 30½ inches.

There were originally two Thunderbird models: the Thunderbird II, with only one pickup, and the Thunderbird IV, with two pickups. The Thunderbird usually features bass humbuckers, colloquially referred to as "soapbars" due to their appearance.

=== Non-reverse Thunderbirds ===
In 1966, Gibson changed the Thunderbird's design and construction. The original Thunderbirds (and Firebirds) have a "reverse" body, with the treble horn extended and the bass horn recessed. Due to a lawsuit brought by Fender because of the resemblance to the Fender Jazzmaster, the body styles were modified, with the result being called the "non-reverse" body. Also, the expensive neck-through construction was replaced by traditional Gibson set-neck construction. The non-reverse Thunderbird was continued until 1969. Though fewer non-reverse Thunderbirds were shipped, the original reverse-body instruments retain a higher collectors' value. Gibson started producing the non-reverse Thunderbirds again for the public in late 2012.

== 1976–1979 reissue ==
The Thunderbird IV was reissued in 1976 as a bicentennial edition. This reissue featured the original body shape and neck-through construction but unlike the previous issues, the bicentennial edition included the new "three-point" bridge and a red, white, and blue Thunderbird logo. The bass was offered in tobacco burst, ebony, white, or natural finish. After the bicentennial, the Thunderbird was continued as a regular production model until 1979, when it was discontinued once again.

== Fenderbird ==
The Who's John Entwistle used Thunderbird IVs from 1971 to 1974, but was dissatisfied with the necks. He bought several Thunderbird basses after the model was discontinued and gutted them. He then had several bodies cut to the original shape, attached Fender Precision Bass necks to them, and installed the salvaged hardware.
