= Gibson Explorer =

Electric guitar model by Gibson

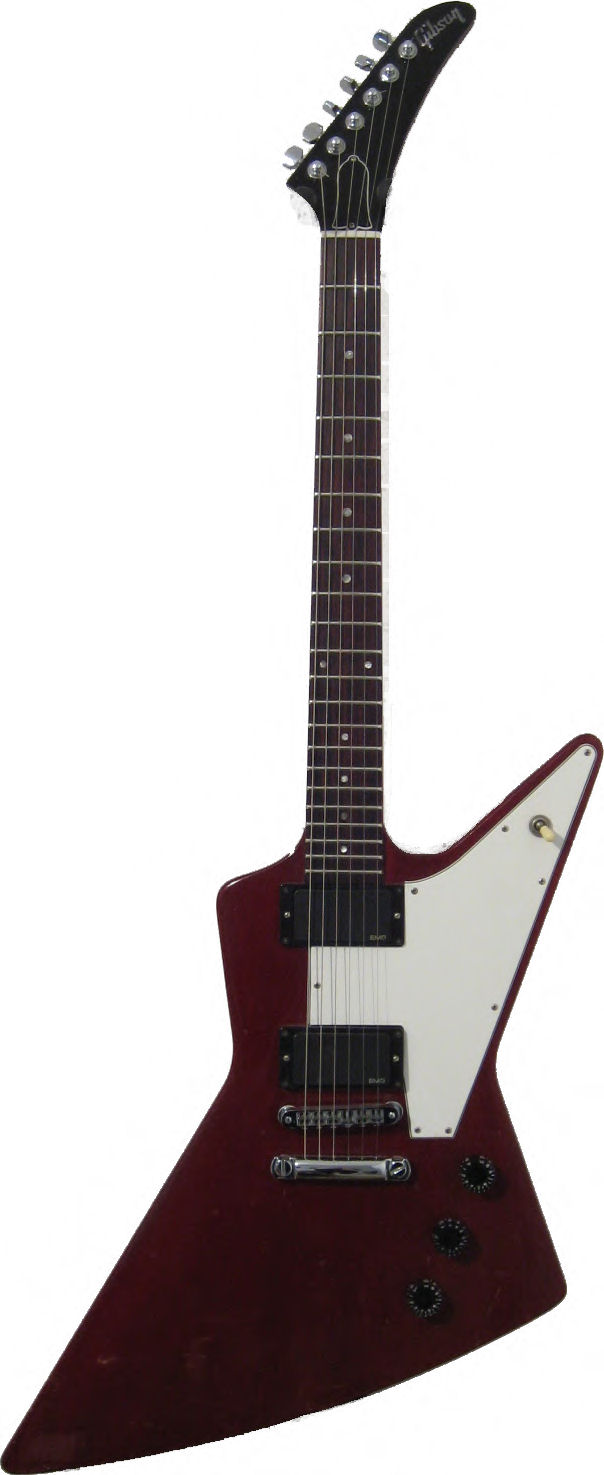
- Gibson Explorer with a set of EMG 81 and EMG 85 active pickups
- Manufacturer: Gibson
- Period: 1958–1963, 1976–present

Construction
- Body type: Solid
- Neck joint: Set
- Scale: 24.75"

Woods
- Body: Originally (1958–1963) korina, later models mahogany, alder, maple, or korina
- Neck: Originally (1958–1963) korina, reissues mahogany, maple, or korina
- Fretboard: Rosewood or Ebony (Gothic, and Classic White only)

Hardware
- Bridge: Tune-o-matic, Gibson Vibrola or Floyd Rose locking vibrato.
- Pickup: 2 or 3 Humbuckers

Colors available
- Ebony, Cherry, Classic White, Natural

The Gibson Explorer is a type of electric guitar model by Gibson guitars, released in 1958. The Explorer offered a radical, "futuristic" body design, much like its siblings the Flying V, which was released the same year, and the Moderne, which was designed in 1957 but not released until 1982. The Explorer was the final development of a prototype design that, years later, Gibson marketed under the name Futura.

The Explorer's initial run was unsuccessful, and the model was discontinued in 1963. In 1976, Gibson began reissuing the Explorer after competitor Hamer Guitars had success selling similar designs. The Explorer became especially popular among the hard rock and heavy metal musicians of the 1970s and 1980s.

== First Explorers ==
Gibson displayed a prototype guitar at the 1957 NAMM Convention which was dubbed the Futura. It featured the body shape which would later be known as an Explorer, but with no controls and a V-shaped headstock.

Gibson produced a very small first commercial batch of only 19 Explorers during the 1958 run of the original korina wood model, but only made and released 3 in the following year, 1959.

After the first few guitars, the Explorer had a long drooping headstock with the tuners placed in a straight line on one side (referred sometimes as "banana" and "hockey-stick"). This headstock design was incorporated by Grover Jackson, founder of Jackson Guitars and other electric guitar makers such as Kramer 20 years later, giving rise to the "pointy-headstock era" of guitars. However, the very earliest Explorers made between 1957 and spring 1958 featured an unusual "split"-shaped head with the tuners placed in a standard 3+3 arrangement, carried over from the Explorer prototype (better known as the Futura).

The 1958–1959 korina Explorer is one of the most valuable production-model guitars on the market, ranked at #4 on the 2011 Top 25 published by Vintage Guitar, worth between $250,000 and $300,000. Only 22 were shipped in its first two years, 19 in 1958 and 3 in 1959; an unknown (small) number of leftover bodies were completed with nickel 1960s hardware and sold in 1963. 38 examples were known to exist as of 2011.

== Explorer variations ==
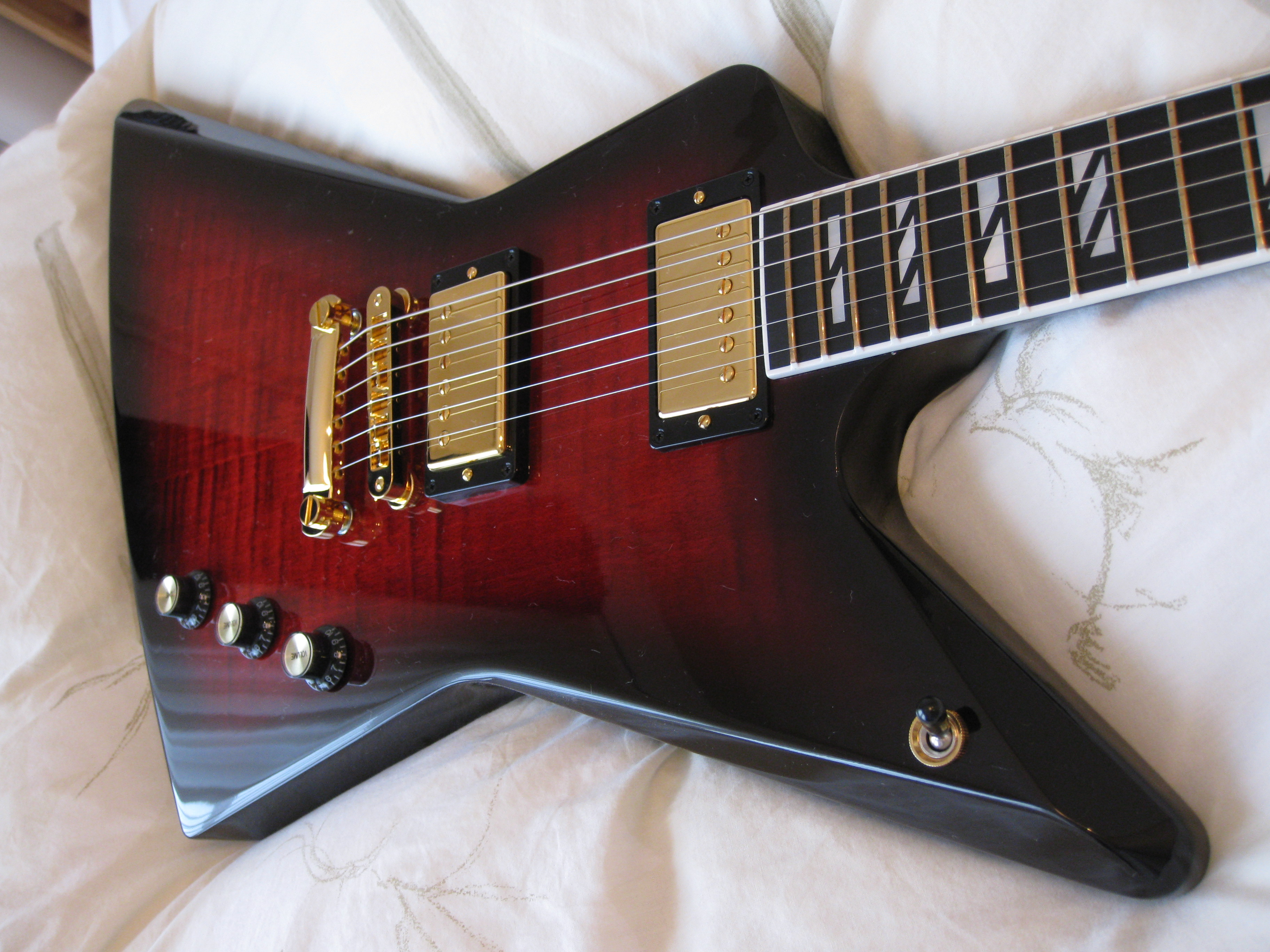
50-Year Commemorative Explorer (DSX50) with rounded edges

There have been several variants produced by Gibson. These include several smaller-bodied, more "user-friendly" versions such as the X-Plorer Studio; the Matthias Jabs-designed Explorer 90 (named so because it was 90% the body size of a regular Explorer), and the Explorer Pro, introduced in 2007.

In 1976 Gibson released a "Limited Edition" Explorer in mahogany with gold hardware.

In 1979 Gibson introduced the E2 model (also known as the Explorer II), featuring a 5-piece walnut/maple laminated construction and a contoured body. This model was discontinued after 1983, but was partially returned as the "Thunderhorse", a signature model for comedian/musician Brendon Small, which was heavily based on the E2.

From 1979 to 1983 Gibson produced the "Explorer II", not to be confused with the later E/2 Explorers. The distinction is that the Explorer-II/E-II has a straight edge body with cream binding. These E-II's are made with a mahogany back and figured/flamed maple tops in "burst" colors, namely "cherry-burst" and "Tobacco burst". They did not come in clear or solid colored finishes. Also, they have the TP6 tail-piece, gold hardware, and "velvet brick" or "dirty fingers" pickups, cream color body binding, with a black pickguard and 3 knobs in a row. The necks have ebony fretboards. Those items together distinguish an Explorer II from the later E/2.

For the E/2 Explorer, Gibson optioned them with various different parts. The biggest difference was the curved/contoured body. Some came with "dirty fingers" pickups where some are cream and black-colored (Zebra) or all black. Most had the standard stop-bar tailpiece, but some E/2's did come with a TP6 tailpiece. The E/2 was also offered in burst colors and clear finishes, whereas the E-II did not come in clear finishes.

Gibson also produced a range of Explorer models between 1981 and 1984 with high-output "dirty fingers" pickups, maple neck and body, and a bound figured maple top available in natural, cherry sunburst, or vintage (tobacco) sunburst finishes. These were alternately named E/2, Explorer CMT, or The Explorer. They could be equipped from the factory with either a standard tune-o-matic bridge/stopbar tailpiece or a Kahler tremolo.

From 1984 to 1987 the standard Explorer's body wood varied between mahogany and alder. The neck wood would vary between maple and mahogany and the fretboard wood varied between Indian rosewood and ebony. Other additions to this model included rear-loaded pickup cavities, no pickguard, and control knobs arranged in a triangle pattern (rather than a straight line as on the original model).

In 1984 and 1985 Gibson produced the Explorer III, with three single-coil P-90 pickups and an alder body, as well as the Designer Series Explorer (and Flying V), which had factory-painted graphics in geometric and "Artist Original" designs.

In 1998 Gibson introduced an Explorer in its "Gothic" line, which featured Gibson's guitars (including the Explorer, Flying V, SG, and Les Paul) in matte black finishes.

Several variants are also produced by Epiphone – Gibson's lower-cost, non-US manufacturer. These include a model produced in korina wood and Epiphone's own "Goth" model, available with a stop-tail or Floyd Rose locking tremolo bridge. Epiphone also produced an Explorer Bass in ebony black and velvet natural finishes with two humbucking pickups and a 34"-scale 22-fret dark rosewood fingerboard. The Explorer Bass employs a set-neck design rather than the bolted-neck construction used in the Epiphone version of the Gibson Thunderbird. (Gibson produced some 32"-scale Explorer basses in the 1980s, including one model that featured a futuristic piezo pickup in place of the traditional pickups found on the other models).

In 2001 Gibson produced limited editions of Eric Clapton's modified 1958 Explorer, the Explorer Clapton Cut, featuring a shortened bass bout that allows more comfortable arm positioning, and the Explorer Split Headstock, a faithful recreation of the original 1958 korina Explorer with the "forked" headstock found only on the very earliest examples.

In 2003 Gibson Guitars produced limited editions of Lynyrd Skynyrd guitarist Allen Collins's Gibson Explorer. The guitar is made of African limba wood and features an aged finish, Maestro vibrola, and classic humbucking pickups.

In 2008 Gibson released two new versions of the guitar, the first of which was the "50-Year Commemorative Explorer". This version features a solid mahogany body with AA-grade maple top, and the body style is the so-called "new retro Explorer", which has rounded edges. The second is called the "Reverse Explorer" due to its inverted body style. The reverse model features a carbon fibre-like pickguard and inlays as well as a McCarty-era inspired headstock. Only a limited run of 1000 of each model were built for the Guitar of the Month feature. In the same year, Gibson also released the Robot Explorer, an Explorer version of the Gibson Robot Guitar together with a similar version of the Flying V featuring custom red metallic nitrocellulose finish, ebony fingerboard with white lining and trapezoid inlays, and lacking a pickguard. Production of this guitar was discontinued in 2008.

In 2009 the company released two new versions of the guitar, the first of which is the Tribal Explorer. It features a Kahler-style tremolo and tribal designs and lacks a pickguard. The final new 2009 model is the Holy Explorer, designed as a counterpart to the Holy V, with numerous notches cut through the body of the guitar.

After creating Matt Heafy of Trivium a white seven-string Explorer, Gibson released a statement that they would make a regular production version. It has many classic characteristics such as a rosewood fretboard, 22 frets, 24.75 scale length and a 12" radius while acquiring some more metal-oriented hardware and styling with the addition of active EMG pickups (81-7 bridge & 707 neck), and no fretmarkers on the fretboard.

Although thought to be a staple in the Gibson lineup, the Explorer was discontinued and brought back multiple times in the late 2000s, along with the Flying V. In 2014 a limited edition 120th Anniversary model, with a special 12th-fret inlay and neck binding, was made available. In 2016 the Explorer was brought back into the standard lineup.

In 2021 Lzzy Hale (from Halestorm) was named the first female brand ambassador for Gibson. A few years earlier Gibson USA released a limited editions of Lzzy Hale Explorer. And in 2022 Hale and Gibson created the Explorerbird signature model, the first ever Gibson guitar with an Explorer body/neck and a Firebird headstock.

== Other makers ==
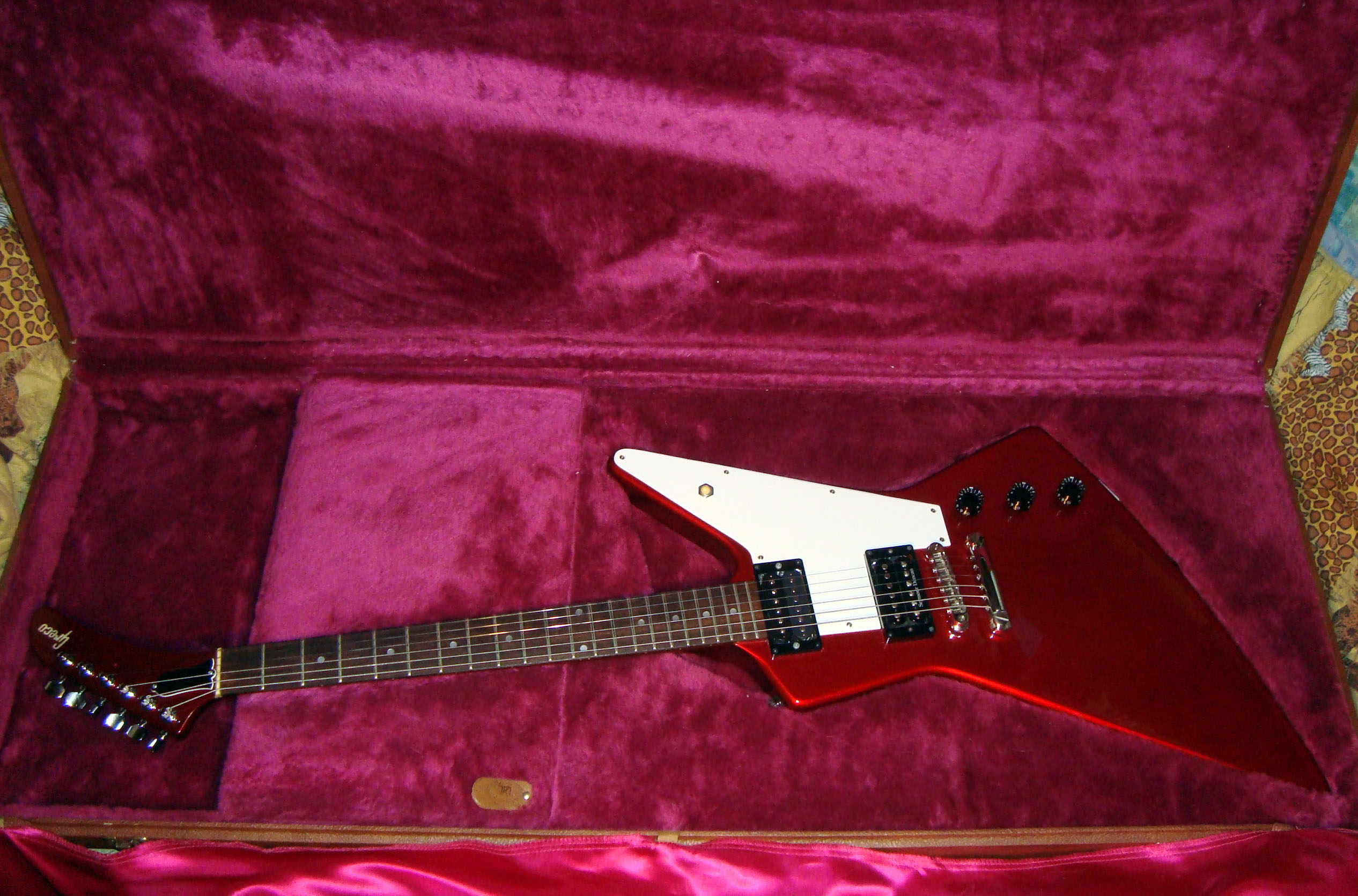
Greco Explorer (EX-800)

Hamer Guitars created a tribute to the Explorer in 1974 called the Hamer "Standard". This model typically differed from the original Explorer in that it had no pickguard and a mahogany body with a highly figured maple top in a cherry sunburst finish, though custom finishes were also available. Gaining popularity with the hard rock musicians of the day, including Rick Nielsen, Hamer's success led the way for other copies and was partly responsible for prompting Gibson's own decision to reissue the Explorer.

Jackson Guitars (now a subsidiary of Fender) was sued by Gibson for their line of Kelly guitars, which are very similar to the Explorer. The Kelly was sleeker and lighter, with basically the same shape but with beveled edges.

High-end guitar company Alembic Inc produced the Exploiter bass guitars for the late John Entwistle of the Who. These basses had the body shape of the Explorer with either a cone- or V-shaped headstock. The Exploiter is different in that the edges are rounded over and the lower bout cuts more deeply into the body than an Explorer. After Entwistle's death, Alembic released the "Spyder" based on John's custom basses, with production limited to 50 guitars. Warwick also produces the "Stryker" basses, based on the custom Explorer-style basses.

Dean Guitars produced a John Entwistle Spyder Signature Bass in 2013, limited to 25 US models and a low-cost Korean import series.

Ibanez introduced the Destroyer model in the 1970s, with a korina-coloured Japanese Sen body that closely resembled the original 1958 Explorer. In about 1981 Ibanez changed the shape of the Destroyer body. Although the new Destroyer II model was still clearly inspired by Gibson's original Explorer design, the body lines were modified, most notably around the treble "horn" and the rear edge, and the headstock was changed to a slight variation of the traditional Ibanez headstock shape, no longer resembling Gibson's "hockey stick" shape.

Dean Guitars was ordered to halt sales of the Dean Z in 2022 after the shape was found to infringe on Gibson's patents.

Other guitars similar to the Explorer include the ESP EX Greco guitars' Explorer, Aria Pro II, Kramer's Condor, Peavey's Rotor series, Rondo Music's Douglas Halo and Agile Ghost, Gaskell Guitars Classic (left handed only), Gordon-Smith's Explorer, Chapman's Ghost Fret, and the Cort Effector (an Explorer version with built-in effects, but no pickup toggle switch).

Gibson owns U.S. Trademark 2,641,548 for the mark EXPLORER in connection with guitars. Gibson also owns U.S. Trademark 2,696,053 for the Explorer's headstock design, and U.S. Trademark 2,053,805 for the Explorer's body shape design. However, the enforceability of the latter two design trademarks is uncertain in light of Gibson's unsuccessful lawsuit against PRS Guitars for allegedly infringing Gibson's Les Paul shape. In 2005 the United States Court of Appeals for the Sixth Circuit ordered summary judgment against Gibson in that action, on the grounds that there was no evidence to support a finding of likelihood of confusion.

== See also ==
- Dean ML
- Dean Z
- Gibson Brands
- Gibson Firebird
- Gibson Modernistic Series
- List of Gibson players
