= Gibson Firebird =

Solid body electric guitar

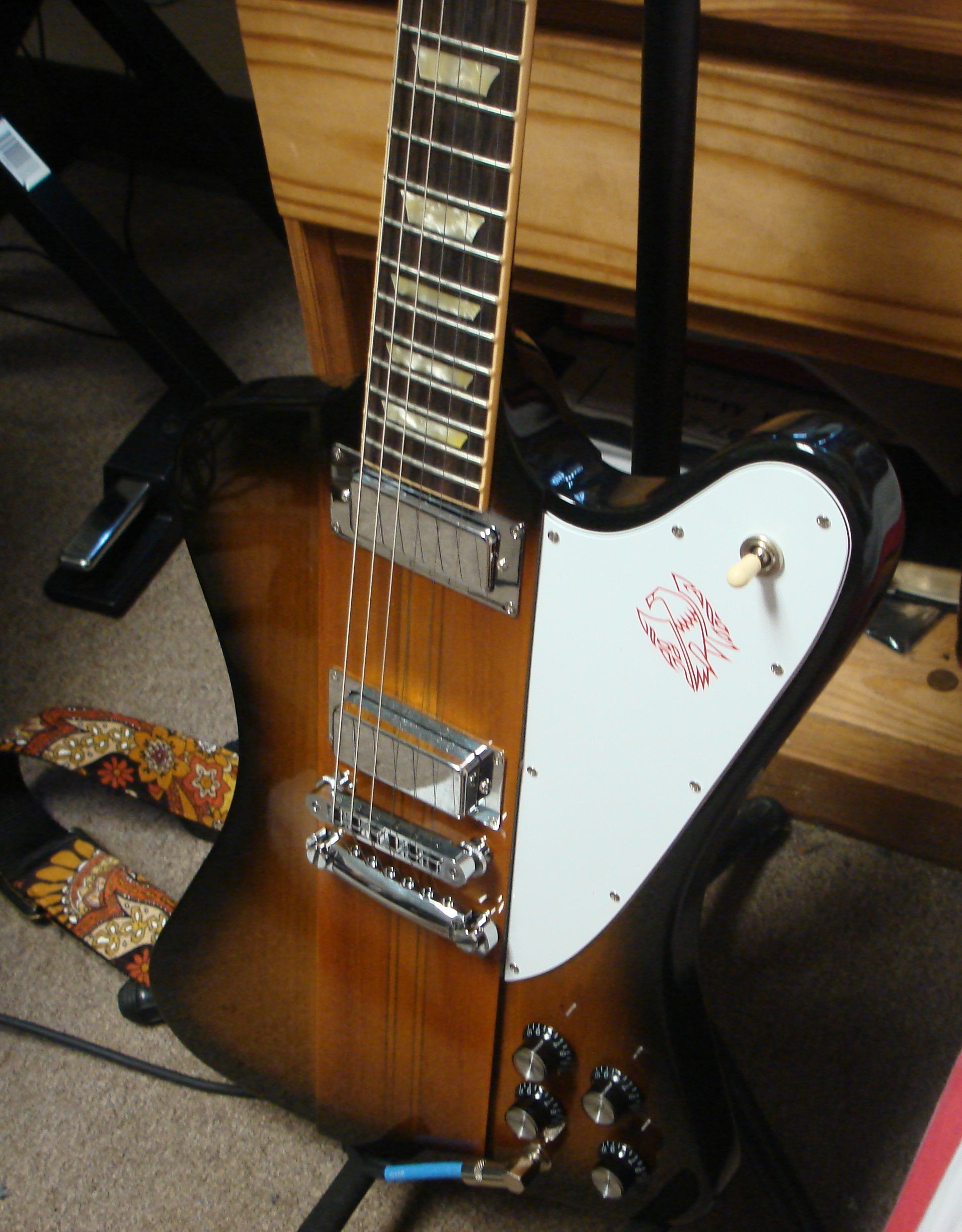
- 2008 Gibson Reissue Firebird V in 'Vintage Sunburst'
- Manufacturer: Gibson
- Period: 1963–present

Construction
- Body type: Solid
- Neck joint: Through-body; some models have set necks
- Scale: 24.75"

Woods
- Body: Mahogany
- Neck: Mahogany and Walnut
- Fretboard: Rosewood or Ebony with trapezoid, block, or dot mother of pearl inlays

Hardware
- Bridge: Tune-o-matic ABR-1 style, after 2008 Nashville style
- Pickup(s): 1, 2 or 3 Firebird Pickups, Full Size Humbuckers, or P-90s

Colors available
- Classic White, Ebony, Pelham Blue, Heritage Cherry, Vintage Sunburst, Antique Natural

The Gibson Firebird is a particularly distinctive solid-body electric guitar manufactured by Gibson beginning in 1963.

It features several highly unusual features for a Gibson guitar:

1. It has a distinctive shape for Gibson instruments. The Gibson RD is similar, launched in 1977 inspired by the Firebird shape.
2. This instrument is made using the neck-through-body construction method. Most Gibson guitars use the set-neck construction method, where the neck is glued into a carved pocket receptacle in the body, as a mortise and tenon joint.
3. The central through-neck portion is 'stepped', being raised above the body's profile. This is highly unusual for any production electric guitar.
4. It is the only Gibson guitar to feature a reverse, six-in-line headstock.
5. The reverse headstock is equipped with rear-mounted banjo style tuners that work with planetary gears that are less efficient than regular guitar tuners.
6. The tuner buttons protrude behind the headstock, facing the player, rather than protruding above or below the headstock. This is unusual for electric guitars.
7. It features unique, fully covered mini-humbucking pickups with metal surrounds.
8. Its pickup selector toggle-switch is mounted on the end of the treble-side horn. Only the Gibson Explorer shares this feature.

== History ==
The Gibson Guitar Corporation released several new styles during the 1950s to compete with Fender's solid-body instruments, such as the Telecaster and Stratocaster. After success with the Les Paul in the 1950s, Gibson's popularity began to wane in the 1960s. Fender's colors, shapes and multiple pickups were endorsed by notable guitarists. Gibson's guitars, most of which were hollow or semi-hollow designs, seemed old-fashioned. Coupled with higher prices, this contributed to a decline in sales.

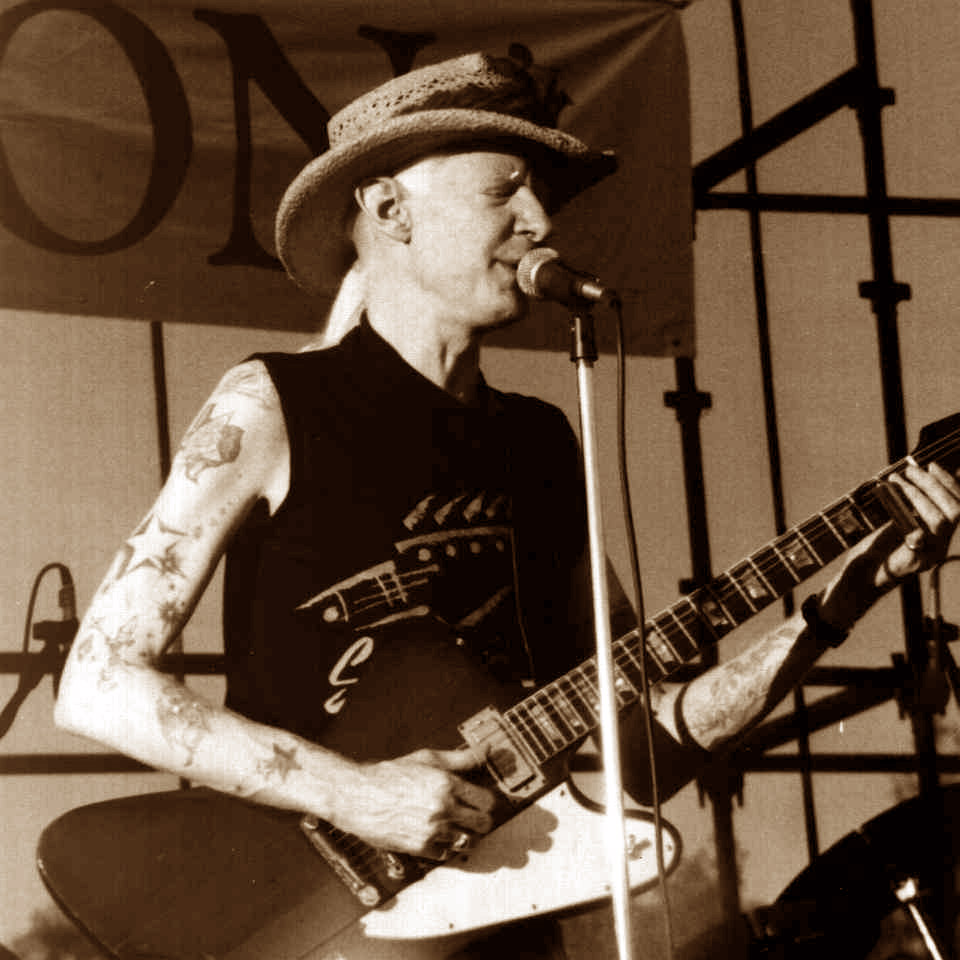
A Gibson Firebird V played by Johnny Winter onstage in 1990

Gibson had made forays into radical body shapes — the Flying V and Explorer in the 1950s — which met limited initial success. The president of Gibson, Ted McCarty, hired car designer Ray Dietrich to design a guitar that would have popular appeal. Under Dietrich, the Firebird took on the lines of mid-50s car tailfins, taking the Explorer design and rounding the edges.

== Reissues ==
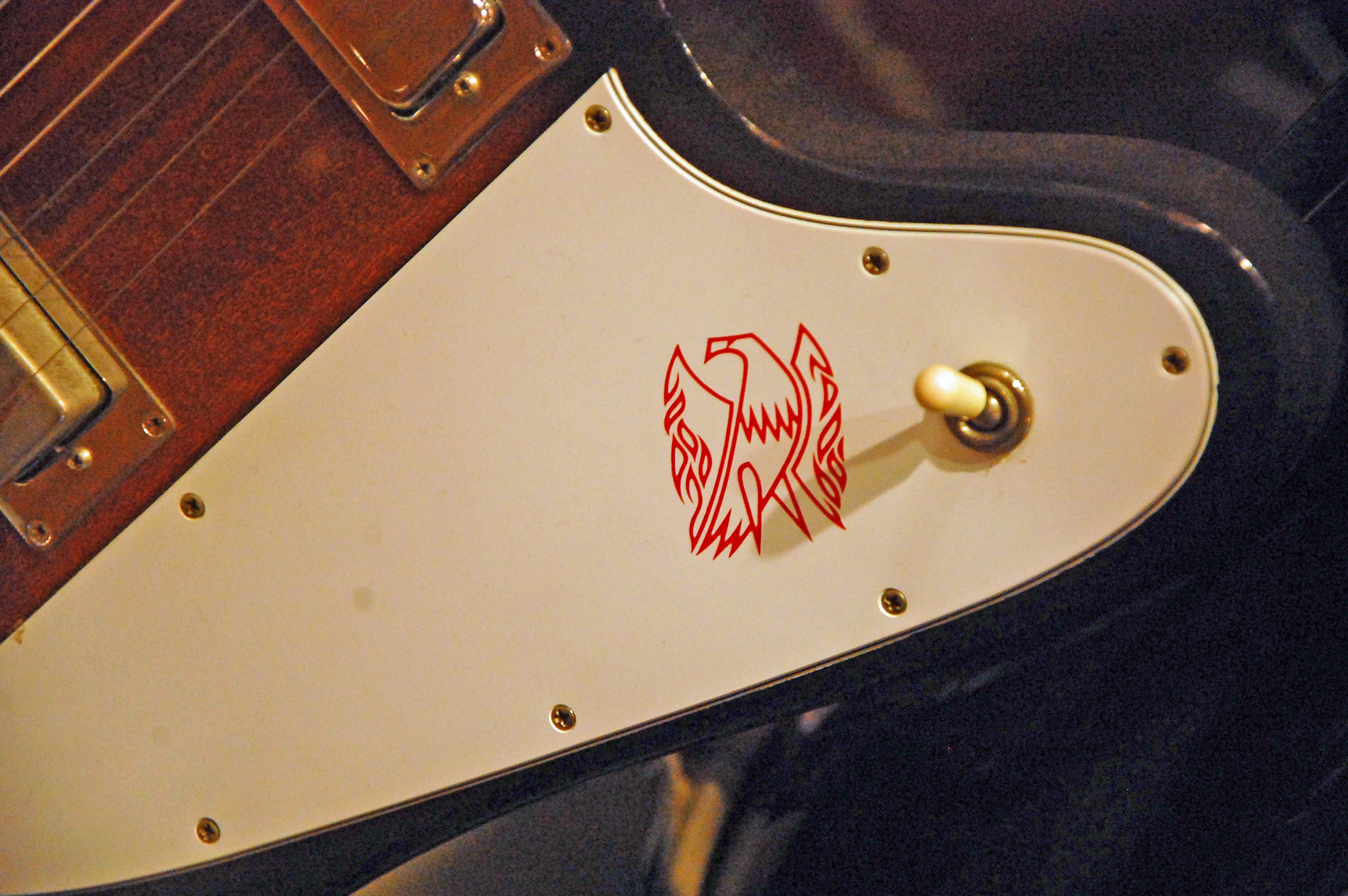
Close-up of Firebird at The Allman Brothers Band Museum

The "reissue" Firebirds are usually based on the original reverse body design, though Gibson reintroduced the non-reverse Firebird in 2002 as a Custom Shop guitar. Epiphone, owned by Gibson, has also issued several models.

Beginning in 2010, Gibson stated that they would no longer be creating banjo tuners for the Firebird.

Gibson reissues of the Firebird do not use the same pickup build that was originally introduced in 1963. The modern Firebird pickups have a higher output volume, more midrange, and less treble than the original design.

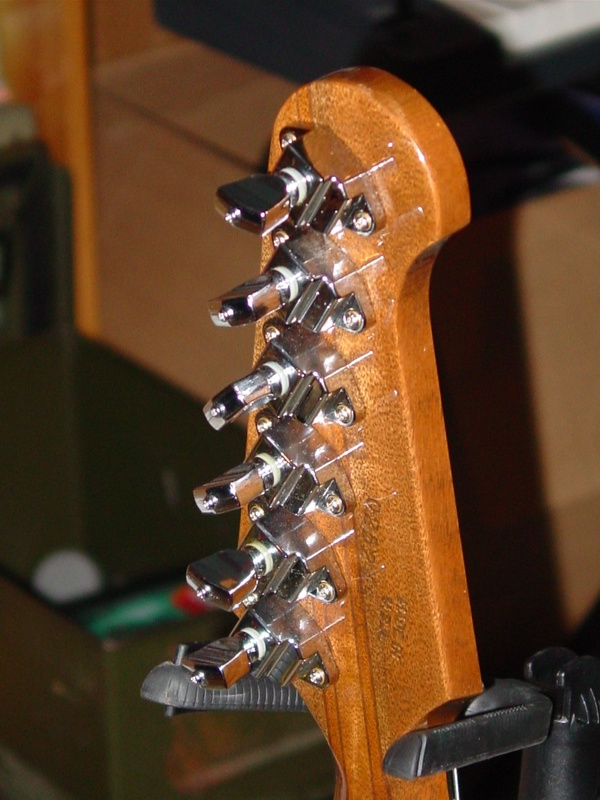
The distinctive "banjo" tuners on a Firebird V

== Firebird X mass destruction ==
In July 2019, A former Gibson employee released a video purporting to show the destruction of several hundred Firebird X guitars by driving a tracked excavator over them. The video was met with incredulity and speculation about the true reason for the destruction.
