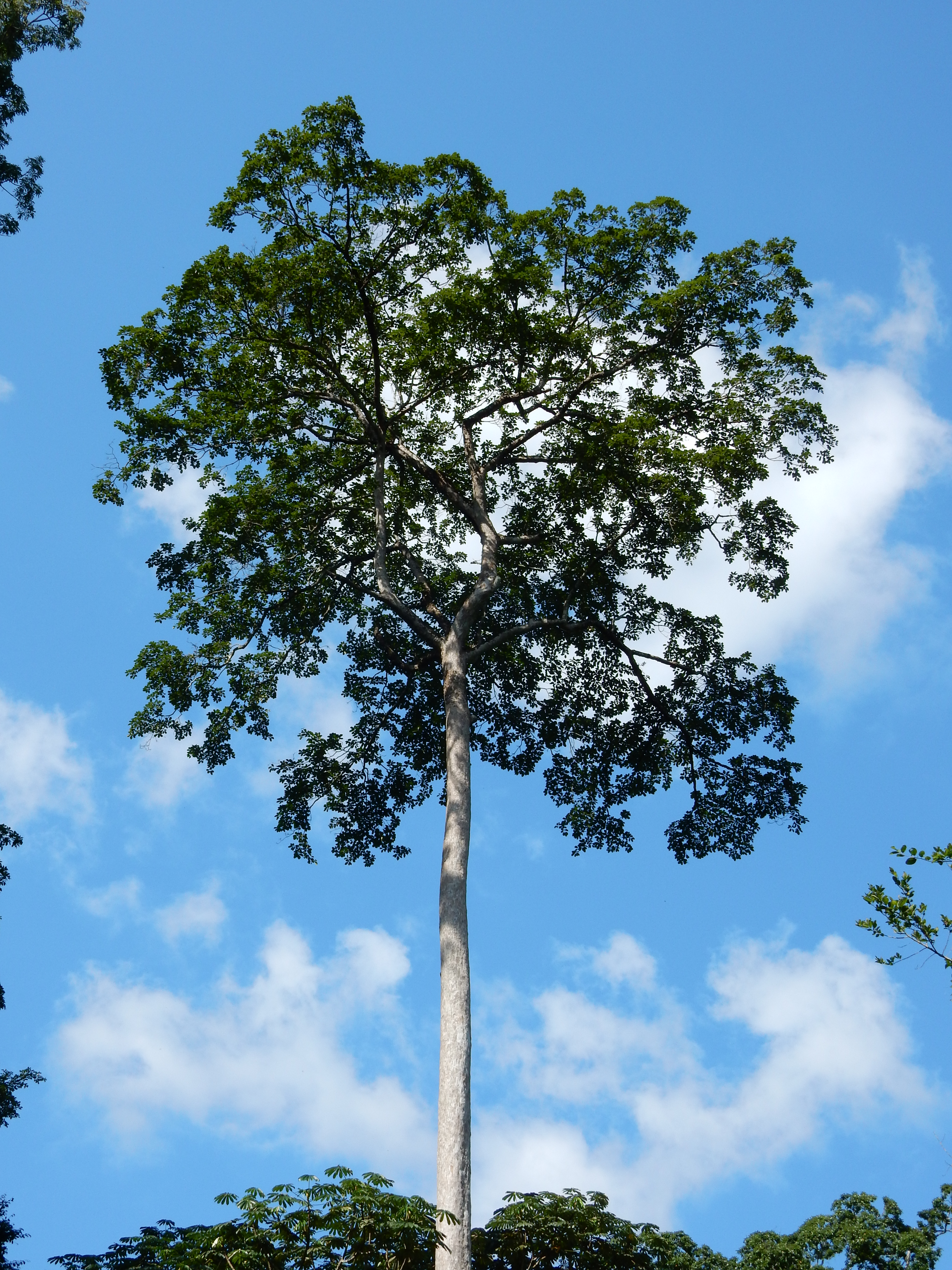
- Terminalia superba at the Luki Biosphere Reserve

Conservation status
- Least Concern (IUCN 3.1)

Scientific classification
- Kingdom: Plantae
- Clade: Tracheophytes
- Clade: Angiosperms
- Clade: Eudicots
- Clade: Rosids
- Order: Myrtales
- Family: Combretaceae
- Genus: Terminalia
- Species: T. superba

Binomial name
- Terminalia superba Engl. & Diels

Synonyms
- Terminalia altissima A.Chev.

= Terminalia superba =

Species of tree

Terminalia superba, the superb terminalia, limba, afara (UK), korina (US), frake (Africa), African limba wood, or ofram (Ghana), is a large tree in the family Combretaceae, native to tropical western Africa.

It grows up to 60 m tall, with a domed or flat crown, and a trunk typically clear of branches for much of its height, buttressed at the base. The leaves are 10 cm long and 5 cm broad, and are deciduous in the dry season (November to February). The flowers are produced at the end of the dry season just before the new leaves; they are small and whitish, growing in loose spikes 10–12 cm long. The fruit is a samara with two wings.

== Uses ==
The wood is either a light (white limba or korina) or with dark stripes (black limba) hardwood. It is used for making furniture, table tennis blades (as outer ply), and musical instruments and prized for its workability and excellent colour and finish. The most well known example of its use in guitars is when Gibson produced their now highly sought-after Flying V and Explorer guitars in 1958. Makers of table tennis blades choose limba, and in particular black limba, for its flexibility and the idea that it enhances top-spin. Limba is used in some blades made by Stiga and OSP. When finished in a clear coat, white limba results in an attractive light golden colour.

It is not rare nor expensive due to overharvesting, but rather is plentiful due to efforts in the 1950s to preserve a natural supply of the wood. This species is reportedly relatively secure, with little or no threat to its population within its natural growth range, according to the World Conservation Monitoring Center in 1992.

== Gallery ==
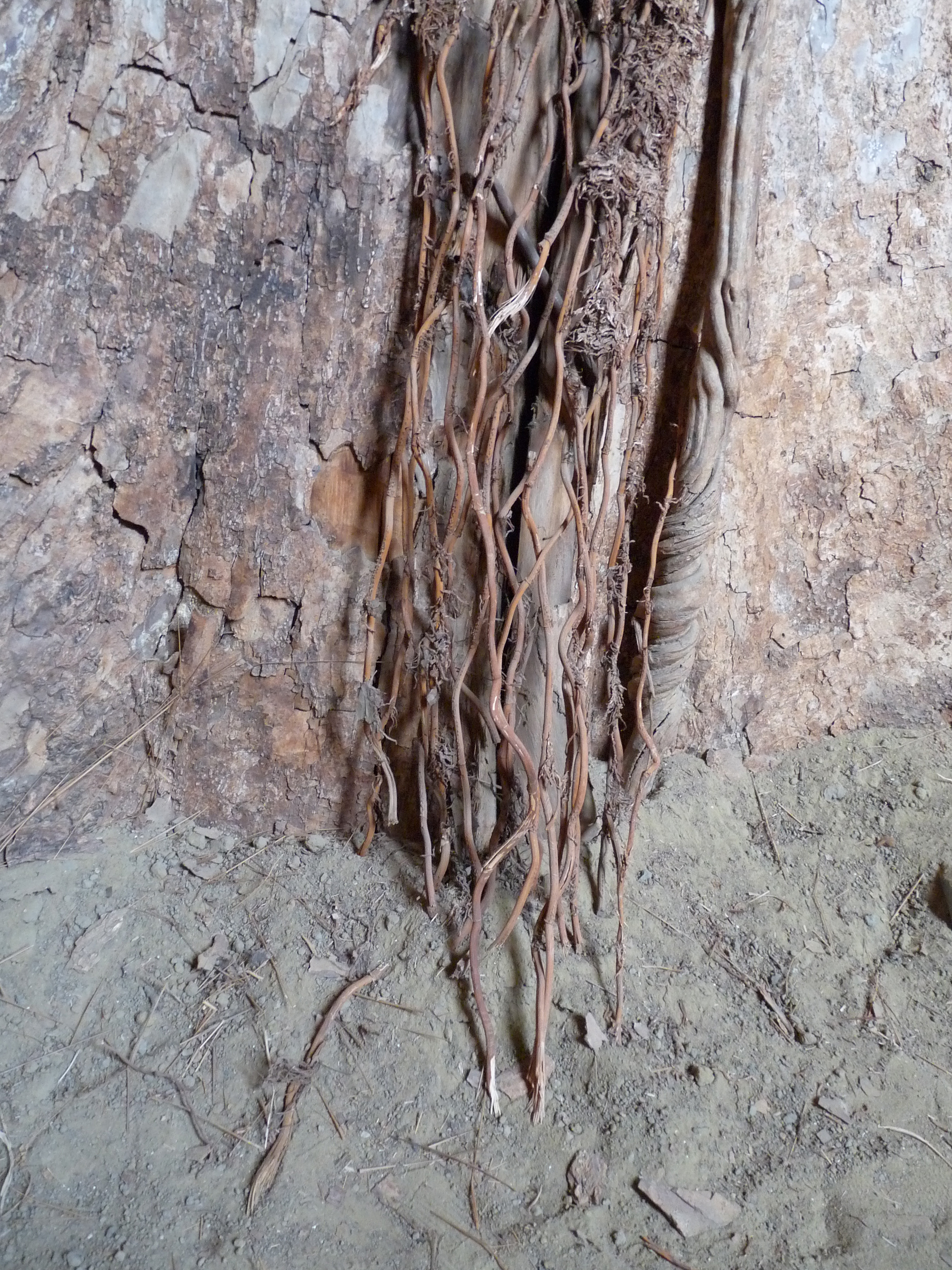

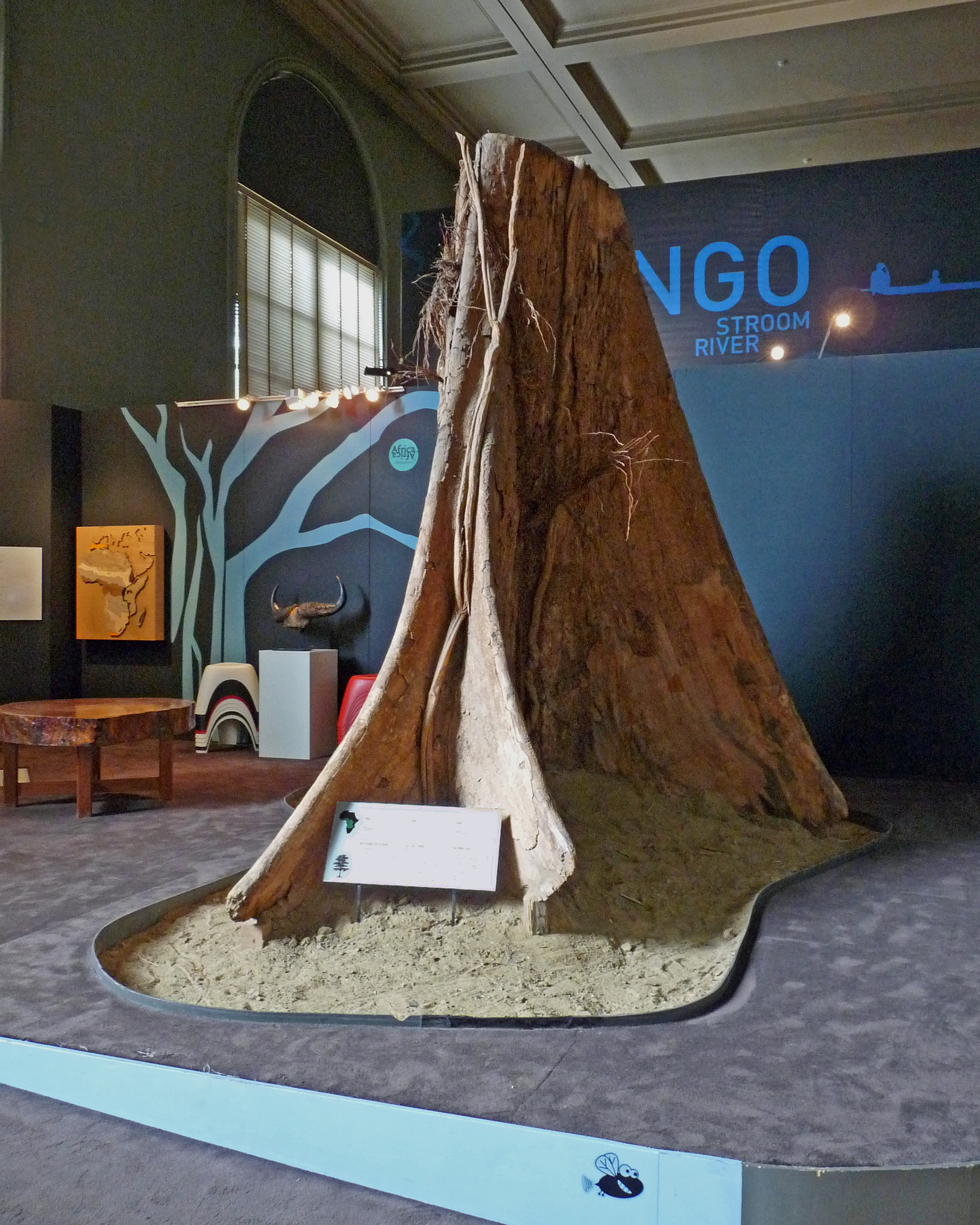

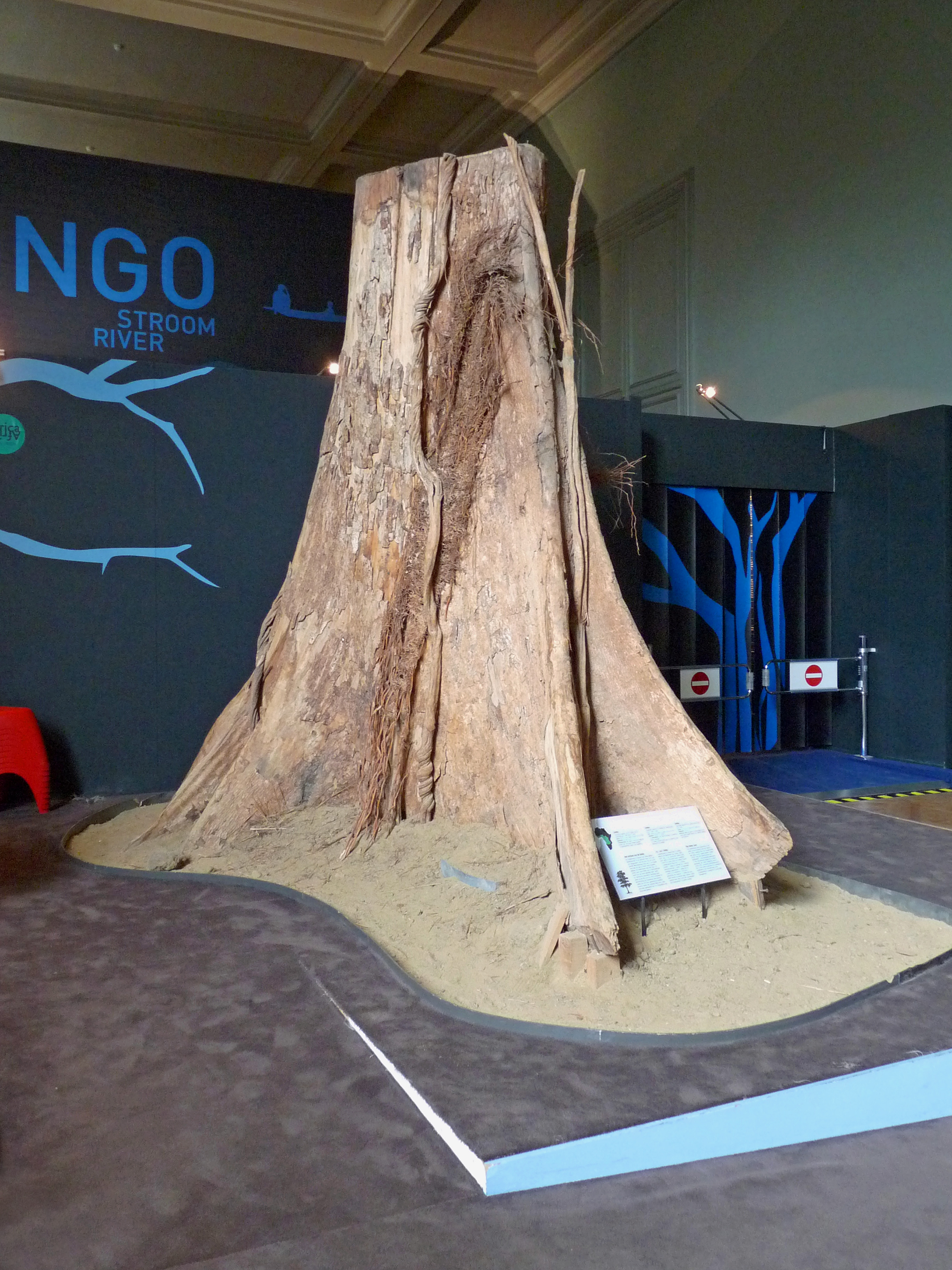

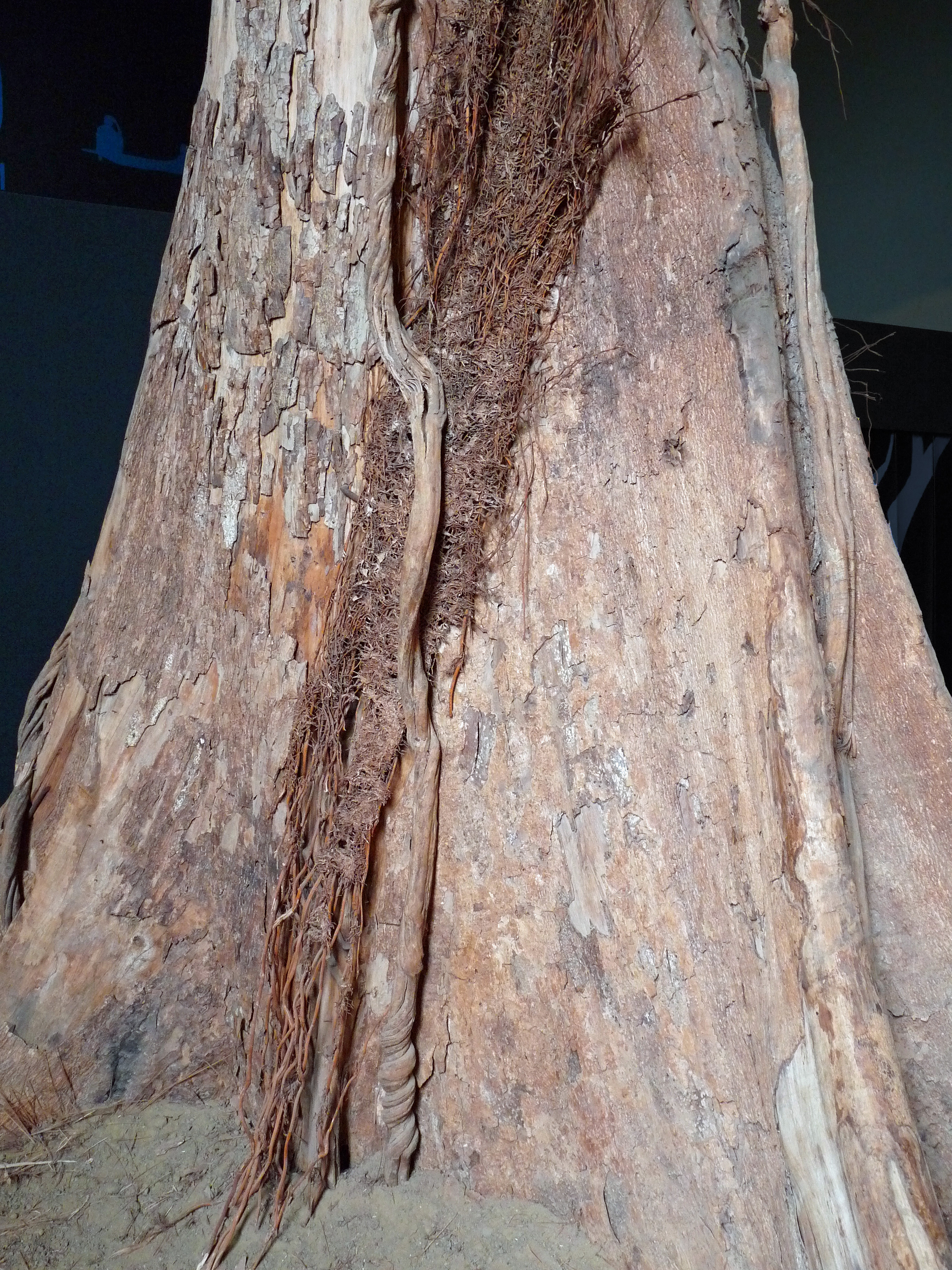

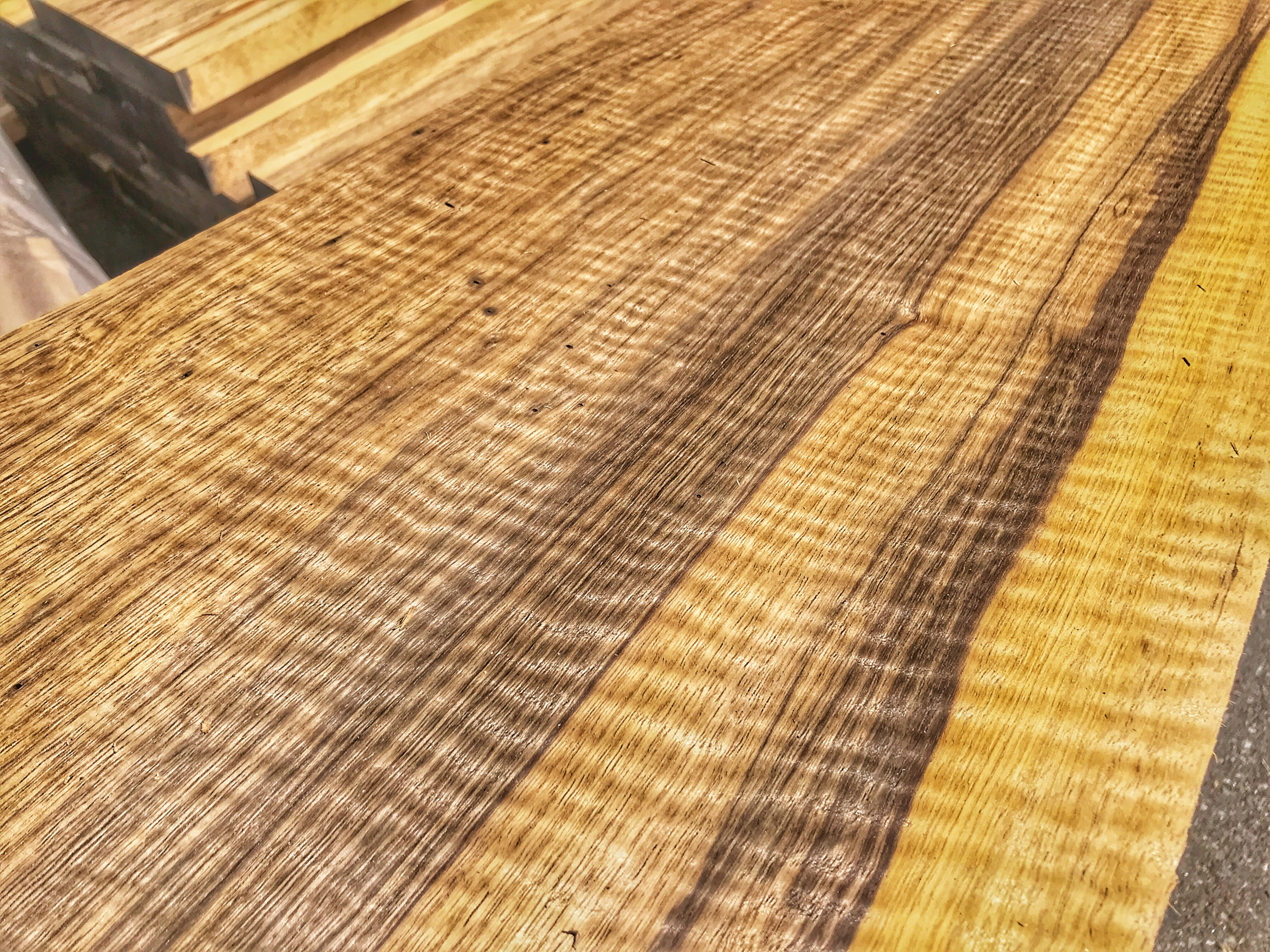
A rare board of 8/4 x 15" wide Quartersawn Black Limba with heavy flame figure

== Bibliography ==
- Gledhill, D. (1972). West African Trees. London: Longman. ISBN 0-582-60427-3.
