= Fender Prodigy =

Electric guitar model

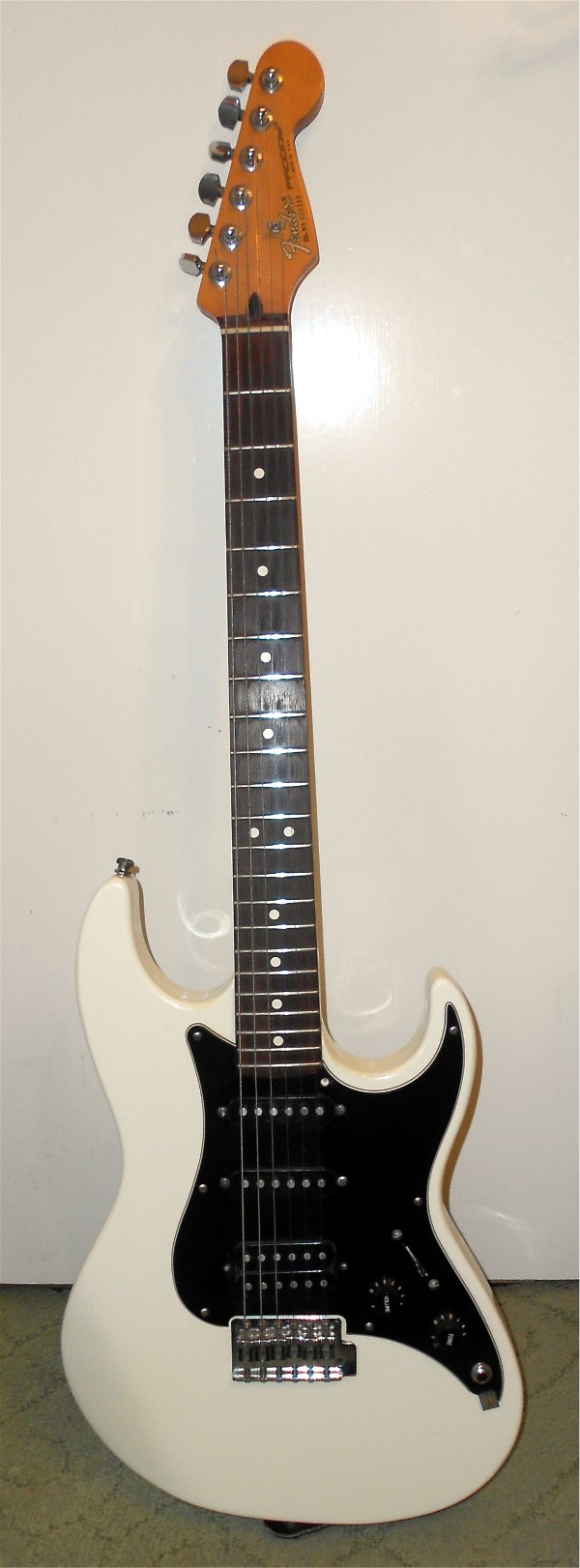
- Fender Prodigy circa 1991.
- Manufacturer: Fender
- Period: 1991–1993

Construction
- Body type: Solid
- Neck joint: "Bolt-on"

Woods
- Body: Alder
- Neck: Maple
- Fretboard: 12" radius Maple or Rosewood

Hardware
- Bridge: Synchronized Tremolo or Kahler Locking Tremolo
- Pickup(s): 2 single-coils and 1 bridge position humbucker

Colors available
- Black, White, Metallic Blue, Metallic Red, Sunburst

The Fender Prodigy is a discontinued model of electric guitar produced by Fender from 1991 to 1993. It is one of Fender's attempts to compete with the superstrat-style guitars produced by Ibanez, Jackson/Charvel, Carvin Corporation and Yamaha. Since the Prodigy series was discontinued after about 2 1/2 years of production without a clear reason, it is considered one of Fender's rare models because of its limited production. Fender also produced a Prodigy Bass based on the Precision Bass Plus Deluxe featuring a P/J pickup layout (P as in Fender Precision Bass and J as in Fender Jazz Bass), 2-band active circuitry and a "fine-tuner" Schaller Elite bridge assembly.

== Design ==
The Prodigy series featured two single coil pickups and one humbucker at the bridge position (sometimes referred to as a Fat Strat configuration). The body shape was similar to that of the Stratocaster; however, it featured an offset body with sharper body edges. The Prodigy was relatively different from the Fender HM Strat since it used Leo Fender's classic Synchronized tremolo system. The Prodigy II was introduced in 1992 which reprised the Kahler locking tremolo and nut system from the HM Strat; this model also featured Fender/Schaller tuners and black hardware.

The Prodigy neck featured 22 frets and a 12" radius maple or rosewood fretboard. Its headstock was strongly reminiscent of the Stratocaster headstock, but slightly taller and narrower.

Prodigy electronics also differed from the Stratocaster in that the Prodigy featured a single volume and only a single tone control. Traditional Stratocasters have a single volume, but have one tone control for the neck pickup, another for the middle pickup, while the bridge pickup has no tone control. Stratocasters also have a rout on the face of the guitar for a somewhat large, angled output jack; this is missing from the Prodigy. Instead, it uses a third hole in the pickguard (which would be used for the second tone knob on a Stratocaster) as the mounting position for the output jack.

== Origin ==
While Tony Bacon's book 50 Years of Fender mentions the Prodigy as being "among the first Fender guitars to receive attention at the company's new factory in Ensenada, Mexico", the headstock is imprinted with "Made in U.S.A." Sources at Fender attribute the majority of manufacture to the Corona, California plant.

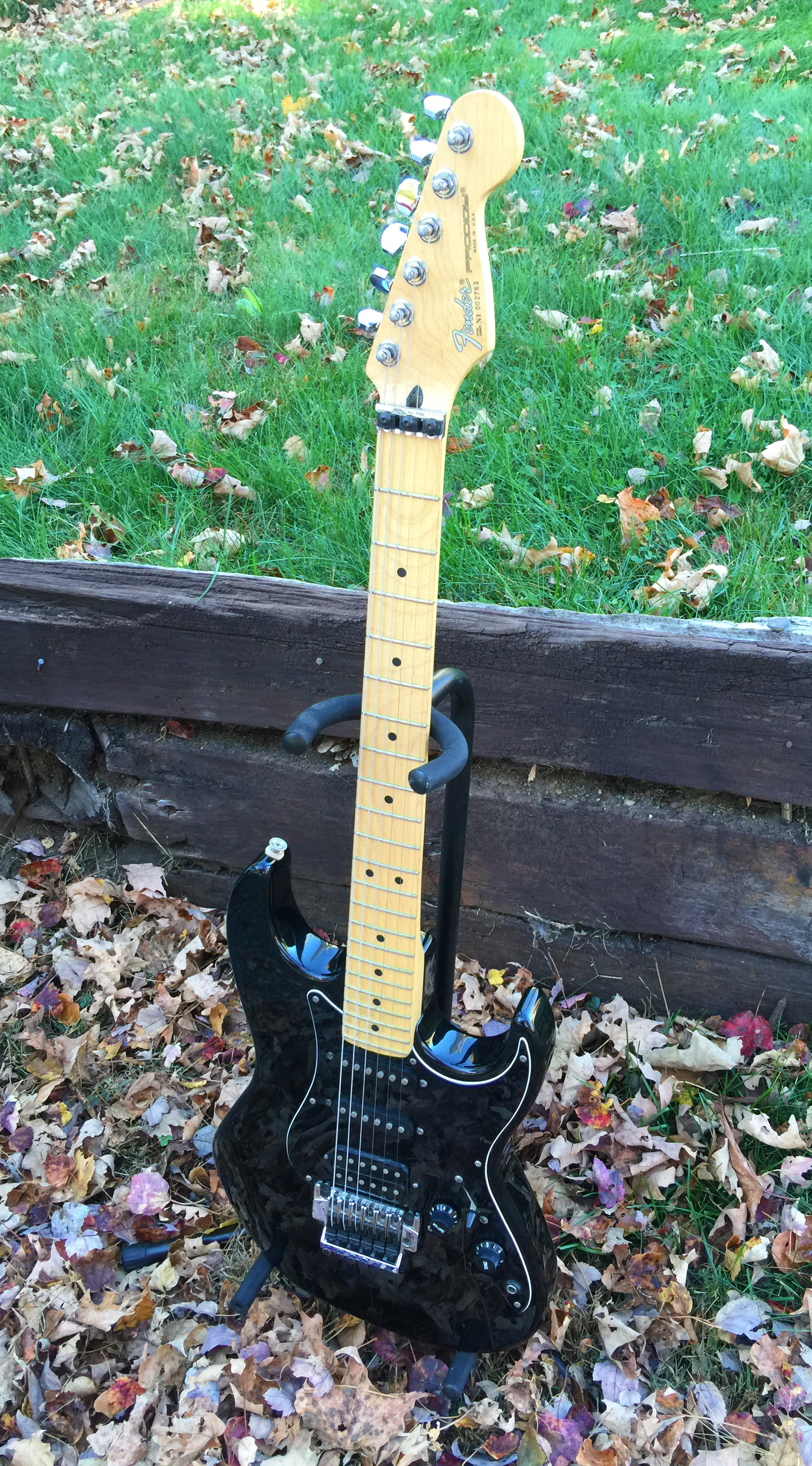
A black 1992 Fender Prodigy.
