= Superstrat =

Electric guitar design

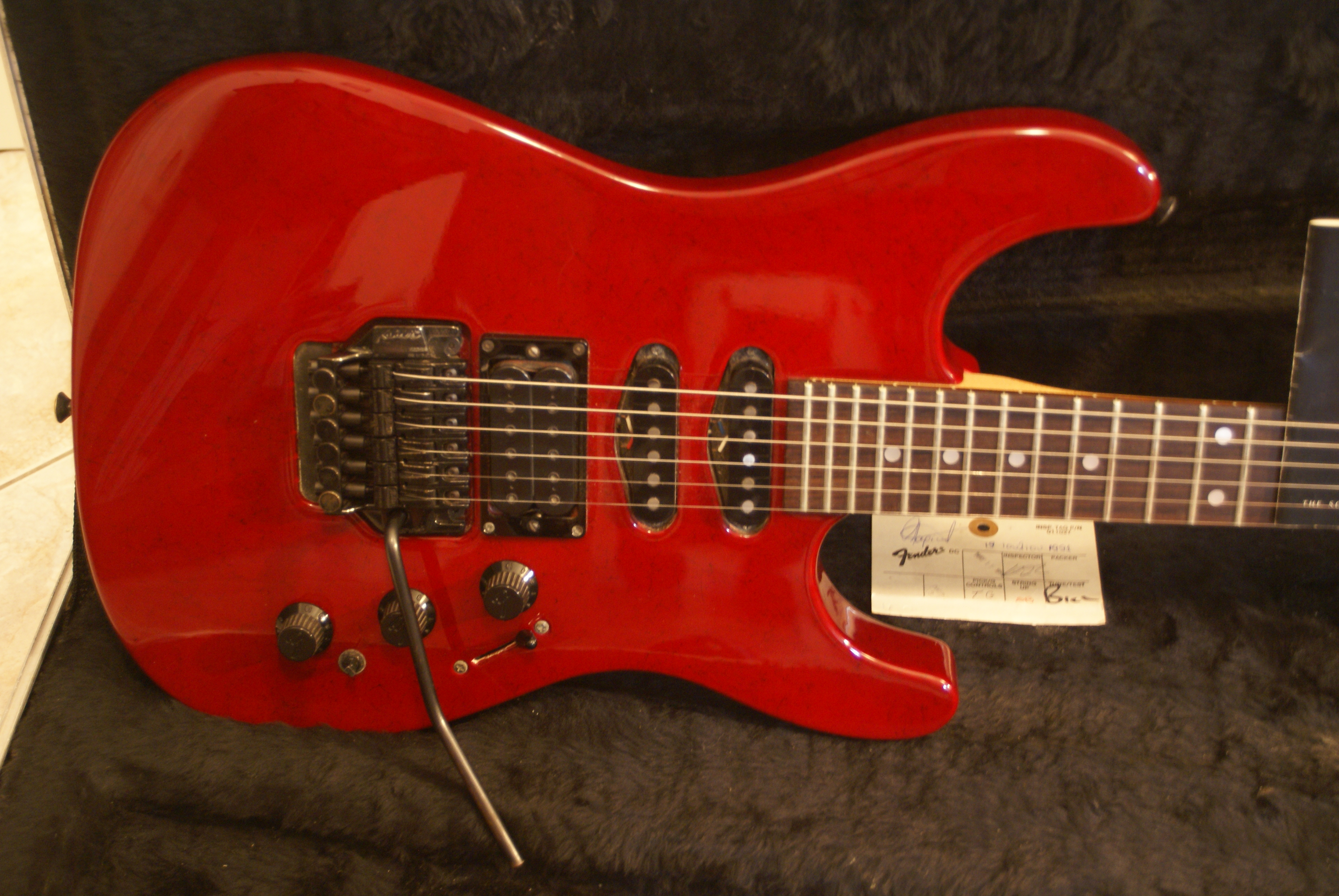
A 1990 US Fender HM Strat

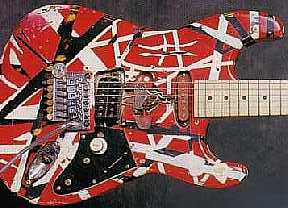
Eddie Van Halen's Frankenstrat, red-painted version

Superstrat is a name for an electric guitar design that resembles a Fender Stratocaster but with differences that clearly distinguish it from a standard Stratocaster, usually to cater to a different playing style. Differences typically include more-pointed, aggressive-looking body and neck-shapes with increased cutaways to facilitate access to the higher frets, an increased number of frets on the fingerboard, a contoured heel at the neck joint facilitating easier higher fret access, the usage of humbucking pickups, and locking vibrato systems, most commonly the Floyd Rose.

There is no formal definition of a superstrat; the categorization is still largely left to popular opinion and depends greatly on the artist(s) associated with a particular model and how it is marketed.

== History ==
=== Origin in custom modifications ===
With the increased popularity of heavy metal music during the early 1980s, guitarists began seeking out guitars more suited to the new style, both in terms of looks (more-"pointy" aggressive designs) and playability (ease of playing and larger tone that sounds pleasant with hi-gain amplification). Guitarists such as Ritchie Blackmore, Uli Jon Roth and Dave Murray had used Fender Stratocasters, but each had minor modifications made to their instrument to suit their individual playing style.

Ritchie Blackmore was one of the first to build a guitar with superstrat characteristics. Dissatisfied with the performance of then-available original stock model commercial guitars, Blackmore sought to create a hybrid instrument that would suit his acrobatic playing style as seen in Deep Purple concert photos from Manchester in 1974.

Eddie Van Halen was another pioneer of the idea. The stock single-coil pickups of a Fender Stratocaster were noisy, and lacked the output necessary to drive an amplifier into hard distortion (characteristic of the Van Halen sound), but the body shape and wide pitch range of the Fender fulcrum tremolo appealed to him. An avid tinkerer, Van Halen assembled a Boogie Bodies Stratocaster body with a thin, 21-fret maple neck and a humbucking Gibson PAF pickup in the bridge slot. This guitar, known as the "Frankenstrat" was featured on Van Halen's 1978 debut album Van Halen, and pictured on the album cover. It was later repainted with a top coat of red, and has had different humbuckers over the years, some of them custom-wound.

While many believe Van Halen's 1977 Frankenstrat to be the first Superstrat, Michael Hampton of Parliament-Funkadelic often used a sunburst Stratocaster with 3 humbucking pickups and a reversed headstock during the band's tours in the mid-to-late 1970s. This guitar can be seen on the DVD George Clinton: The Mothership Connection, which was filmed in 1976.

Jerry Garcia of the Grateful Dead had played various Stratocasters through the 1960s and early 70s, most notably an ash 1957 Strat, "Alligator," given to him by Graham Nash and heavily modified by Alembic Sound. He commissioned Doug Irwin to make him several unique custom instruments, all with Strat-like features and control layouts. The first incarnation of the "Wolf" guitar had Stratocaster pickups mounted in a brass plate that allowed for any pickup combinations.

Soon, other guitarists and luthiers would also apply similar custom modifications to their instruments. Many sources cite Grover Jackson as one of the first (and most influential) guitar makers to have crafted custom shop guitars with all the features of superstrats, doing so as early as 1981. Later all these improvements were integrated in the factory-produced Jackson Soloist model.

=== Mass-production ===
Starting about 1983–1984, companies such as Kramer, Jackson, Charvel, Yamaha, Cort, Aria, Ibanez, Washburn, and Hamer started mass-production of superstrat-design guitars due to growing market demand. The rising popularity of heavy metal music led to a new generation of guitarists that employed fast and complex techniques which demanded thinner and more versatile guitar necks and stable tremolo systems. Some examples of guitars marketed to this specific audience include:

- Kramer Baretta (1983–1991) – an early guitar with Floyd Rose, one slanted humbucker, but more traditional neck and body contours. Baretta has a close connection to Eddie Van Halen's Frankenstrat – it was designed to be marketed as Van Halen's signature model, but Eddie never endorsed the Baretta in terms of playing it on stage.
- Dean Bel Aire (1983–1984) – an early HSS guitar dubbed "superstrat", despite still using bolt-on neck construction with 22 frets and vintage tremolo).
- Jackson Soloist (officially-produced starting August 28, 1984) – HSS guitar with neck-through construction, 24 frets, and Floyd Rose/Kahler bridge – the fullest embodiment of Superstrat features to date in a mass-produced guitar, considered by many the first "definitive" superstrat.

During the rest of the 1980s, due to the style's huge marketing success, most guitar companies had at least one model of superstrat in mass production.

Makers of superstrat models besides the companies mentioned elsewhere in this article also included Fernandes, Schecter, Carvin and ESP.

=== Fender's response ===
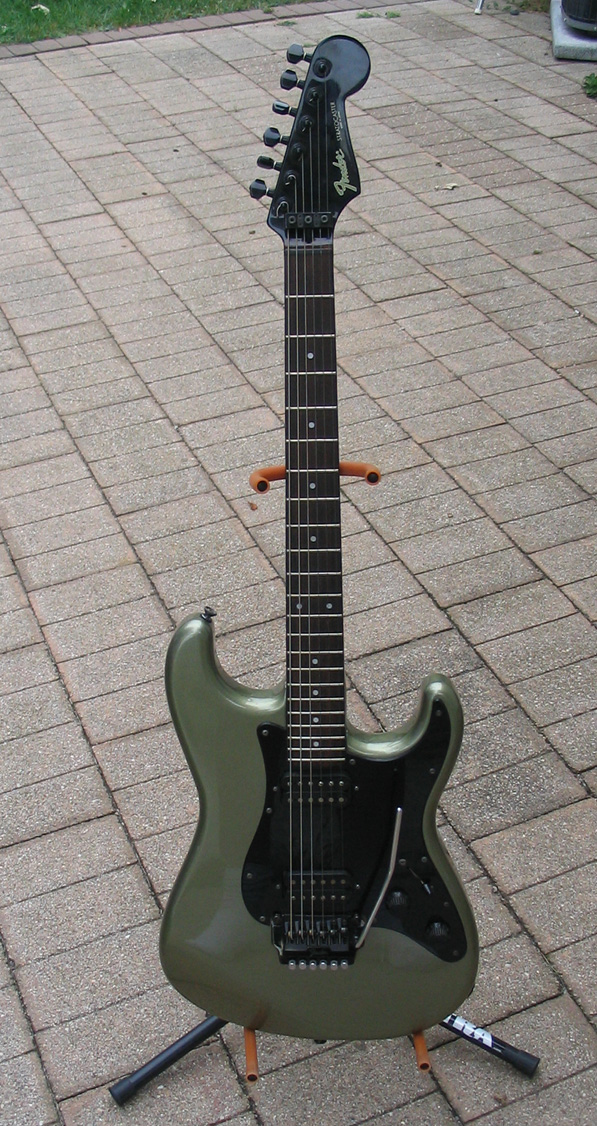
Fender Contemporary Stratocaster Japan, one of several Fender attempts on superstrat market

Fender responded to the superstrat fashion in the mid-1980s, producing a number of models based on the standard Stratocaster.

- Fender Contemporary Stratocaster Japan (1984-1987)
- Fender Performer (1985-1986)
- Fender HM Strat (1988-1992)
- Fender Prodigy (1991-1993)
- Fender Showmaster (1998-2009)

Fender also released several superstrat models, such as Talon, under Fender/Heartfield name from 1989 to 1993.

=== Gibson's response ===
Gibson also produced some models inspired by the superstrat:

- Gibson Victory (1981–1983)
- Gibson WRC (1985–1986) – an early and rare Wayne Charvel model, a line of guitar manufactured exclusively by Wayne Charvel and branded as Gibson.
- Gibson US-1 (1986–1991) – first Gibson mass-manufactured try at the superstrat market
- Gibson U-2 (1987–1992) – second Gibson's superstrat, a somewhat stripped-down version of US-1, featuring basswood body without a figured top, dot inlays, and regular pickups.
- Gibson Q series
- Gibson M-III (1991–1994; reissued 2013)

=== End of superstrat era ===
In early and mid-1990s, heavy metal and particularly shredding declined in popularity, in favor of grunge, nu metal, alternative metal, and other styles. The popularity of superstrats also declined, in favor of guitars more suited to these new styles. Companies that relied on superstrats as a major part of their target market suffered heavy losses and went out of business or were bought by larger corporations:

- Guild exited the solid-body guitar business in 1988 and was acquired by Fender in 1995.
- Hamer was acquired by Kaman Music Corporation in 1988, which in turn was acquired by Fender in 2008. As of 2008, Hamer reduced their superstrat selection to just one model, the Californian.
- Dean was sold to Tropical Music in 1990. Superstrat production was resumed by its new owner in Korea.
- Kramer went bankrupt in 1990 and was sold to Gibson in the early 1990s.
- The Jackson and Charvel brands were bought by Fender in 2002.
- Ibanez suffered heavy losses in 1991–1993 and had to undergo a major restructuring of its model-lineup, adding such series as the GR ("Ghostrider"), Blazer, TC ("Talman"), RT ("Retro") guitars, TR ("Traditional"), and ATK basses. The older Iceman model and Gibraltar bridge were resurrected as part of the new "vintage" theme. This restructuring kept the company afloat, tweaking its image from a "metal-guitar-only company" to a more customer-appealing one.

Nevertheless, extended-fretboard superstrats remain popular in the mid-2010s among metal and shred guitarists in particular, and are produced by guitar manufacturers of all sizes. Additionally, some Stratocaster modifications which were strongly associated with the superstrat, such as the Floyd Rose tremolo system and especially the inclusion of humbucking pickups, have become widely available from stock on 22-fret bolt-on neck instruments which are often seen as Stratocaster variants rather than superstrats, including several stock models of official Fender Stratocaster. A Fender Stratocaster mounted with at least one humbucking pickup (usually a single humbucker replacing the bridge pickup) is often called a "Fat Strat." The available Fat Strat configurations as of 2018 are HSS (all models including both Fender and Squier), HSH (Player and MIM Deluxe only) and HH (Fender Player and Squier Contemporary). Modern solid-body electric guitars with seven, eight or more strings often show strong influence from the superstrat (such as extended fretboards, humbucking pickups, rear routs and/or locking tremoloes alongside a Stratocaster-influenced body shape) or could be regarded as superstrats themselves: for example, the Ibanez Universe, the first mass-produced solid-body seven-string guitar, closely resembles the Ibanez JEM.

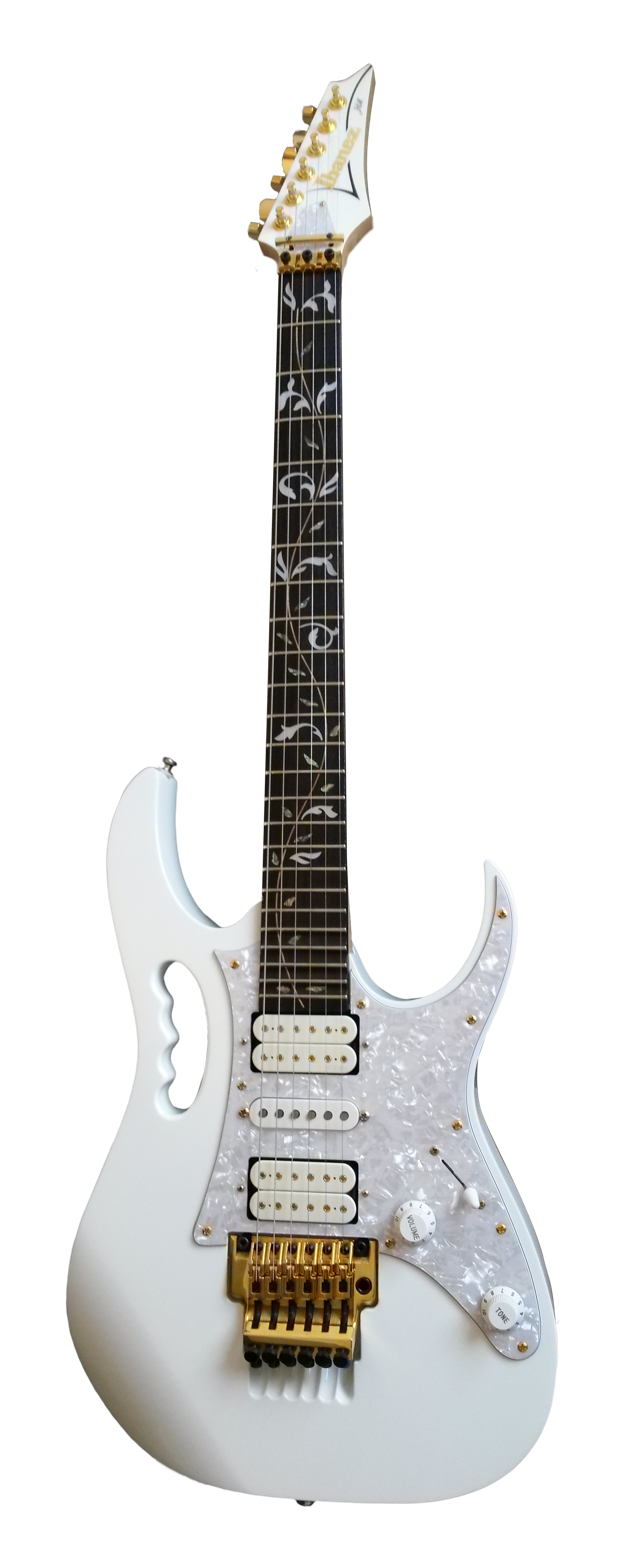
Ibanez JEM guitar features pointed body shape with deep cutaways, HSH pickups, locking tremolo and 24-fret flat slim neck
