= Ibanez JEM =

Electric guitar

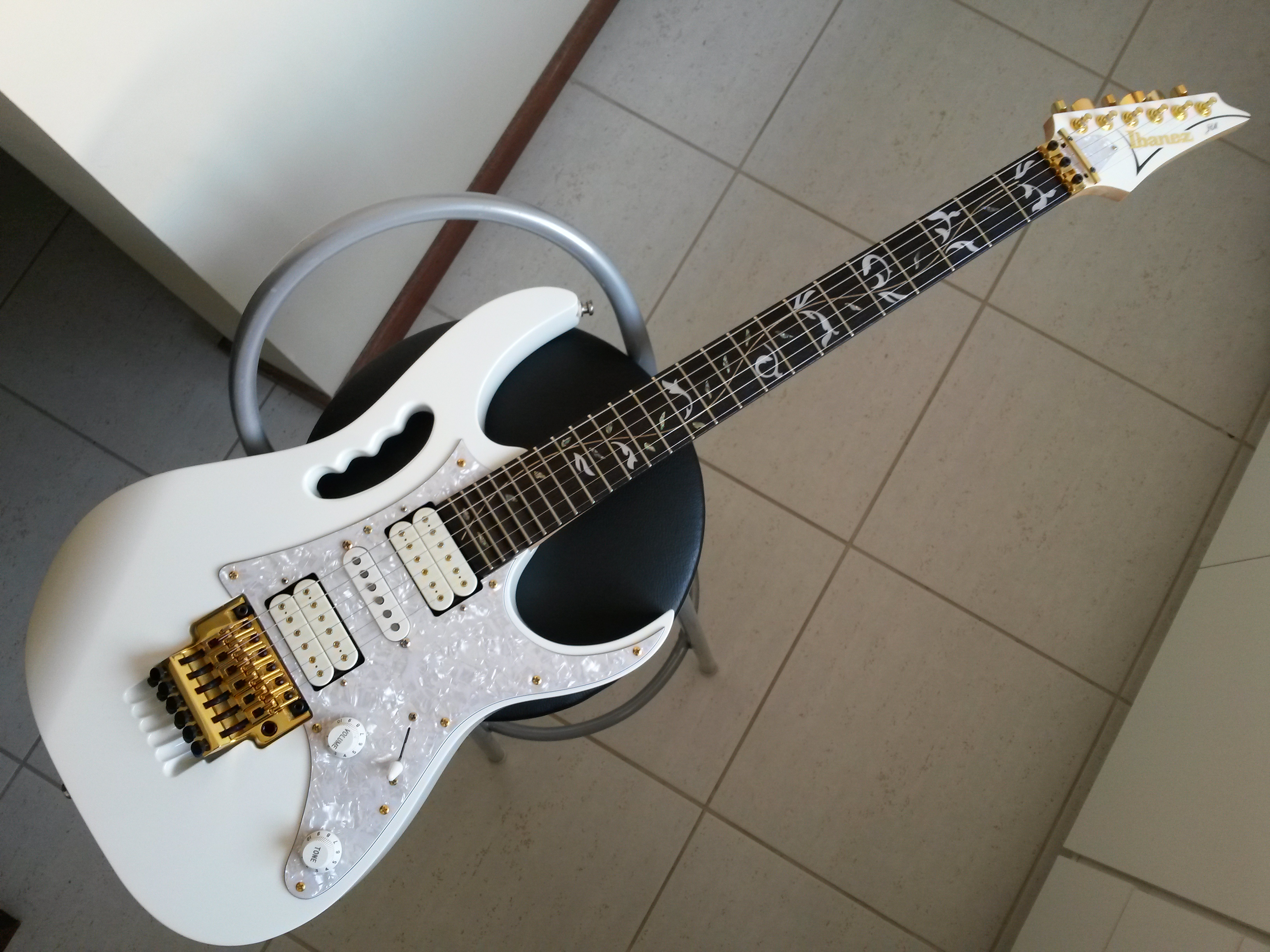
- JEM7VWH
- Manufacturer: Ibanez
- Period: 1987–present

Construction
- Body type: Solid
- Neck joint: Bolt-on

Woods
- Body: Basswood, Alder (varies with sub-model)
- Neck: Maple
- Fretboard: Rosewood, Ebony, Maple (varies with sub-model)

Hardware
- Bridge: Ibanez Edge (varies with sub-model)
- Pickup(s): H-S-H DiMarzio Evolution, DiMarzio Breed (varies with sub-model)

Colors available
- Varies with sub-model

The Ibanez JEM is an electric guitar manufactured by Ibanez and first produced in 1987. The guitar's most notable user is its co-designer, Steve Vai. As of 2010, there have been five sub-models of the JEM: the JEM7, JEM77, JEM777, JEM555, JEM333, and JEM70V. Although the Ibanez JEM series is a signature series guitar, Ibanez mass-produces several of the guitar's sub-models.

The design of the Ibanez JEM series was heavily influenced by the superstrat style of guitars of the early 1980s such as the Jackson Soloist, Kramer Beretta and Hamer Chaparral. This type of guitar is more aggressively styled in terms of shape and specifications compared to the Stratocaster on which they are based.

== History ==
=== Earlier guitars ===
Previously, Vai used handbuilt guitars by Charvel and Jackson. With Joe Despagni and Tom Anderson, he created various custom guitars and used Tom Anderson's model to record the demo of the David Lee Roth album Skyscraper. Vai also began to bring his Tom Anderson guitars on tour:

"... He built this for me after my old green monster, which I used out on the road last year until it died. I was pulling on the whammy bar and ripped the bar right out of the guitar [laughs]; it was actually ripped out before the show at Madison Square Garden. I was dying. So I started using Tom's guitar as my main guitar for the rest of the tour, and I really like it because it has a very heavy sound to it. So I took the best of the sounds from that guitar and had them incorporated into the Ibanez."

=== Ibanez and Steve Vai ===
Vai decided to stop using his Anderson guitar in favor of a guitar deal with a bigger company. Just before Christmas 1986 Ibanez received Vai's guitar specification; they were similar to Despagni's guitars. Ibanez built one of their "Maxxas" guitars for him with a palmrest for the tremolo. Vai liked the model and decided to produce that particular guitar with Ibanez. It took five months to make the new model samples in Japan, the JEM guitar and the RG range which launched at the NAMM Show in June 1987.

== Design and production ==
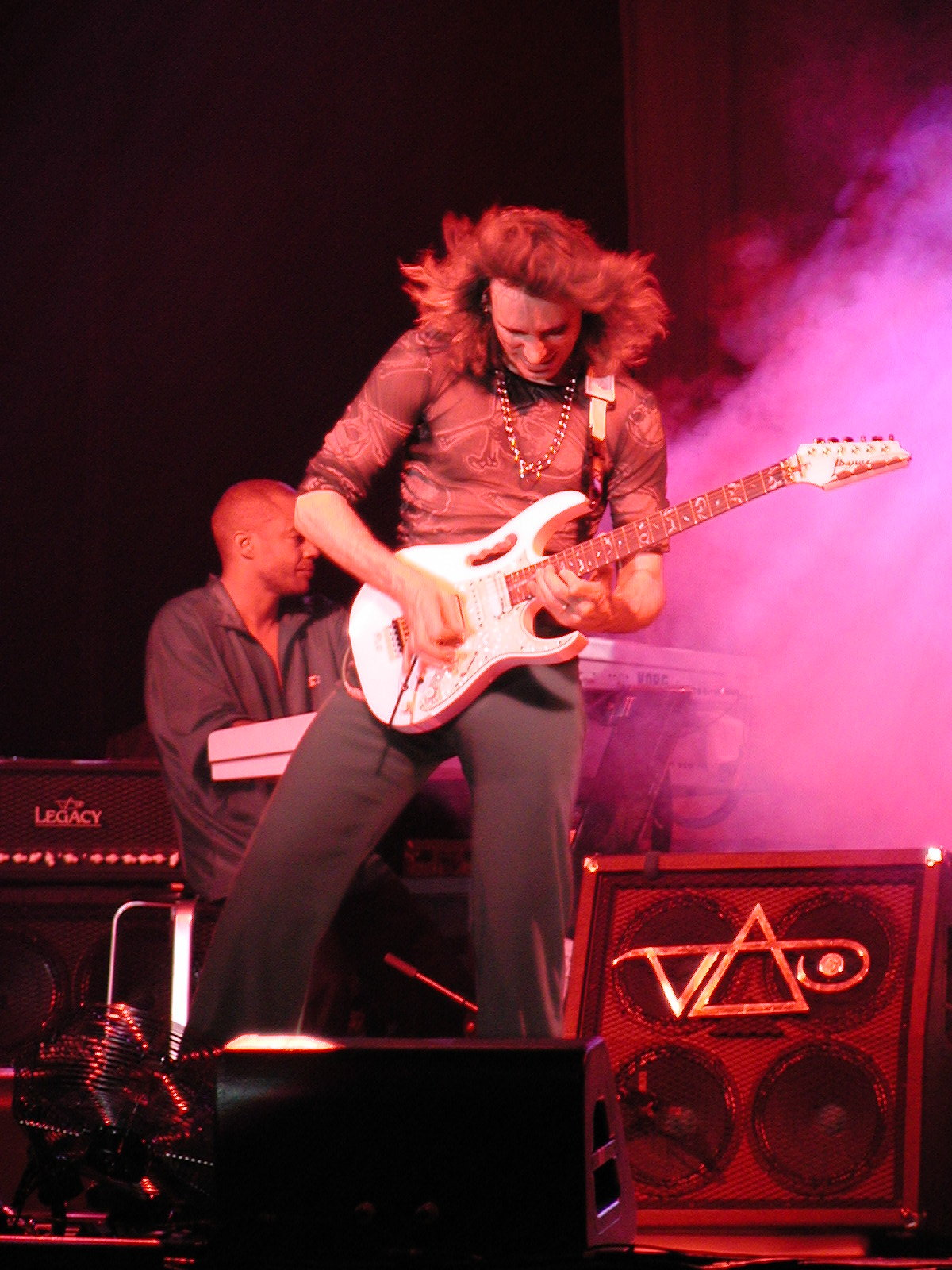
Steve Vai with Ibanez JEM

After the JEM series was launched at the NAMM show, Ibanez with Steve Vai began to design and produce the guitar actively. Rich Lasner of Hoshino explained that Vai used a "Chinese menu approach" to design the guitar (i.e. choosing from many different categories). The first design was by Vai, when he sent Hoshino his ideas from many different guitar features he liked and combined them into one guitar. The essential considerations were the weight, wood types and pickups. For the latter specification, Vai decided long before Ibanez contacted him, that he would use DiMarzio pickups for his guitars.

The JEM had three DiMarzio pickups (a pair of PAF Pro humbuckers and a JEM single-coil) wired in a then-unique arrangement where the 2nd and 4th positions split the humbuckers into single-coils in combination with the middle pickup. This arrangement, pioneered by DiMarzio's Steve Blucher, allowed Vai to achieve Stratocaster-style in-between sounds as well as the humbucker raunch of the PAF Pro. There was also a high-pass filter on the volume control to help the guitar retain high end when the volume pot was rolled back.

It also featured a “bear claw” rout behind the Ibanez Edge locking vibrato bridge, inspired by the chiseled trench Vai had gouged into his Charvel “Green Meanie” guitar. This allowed him to achieve a much further range of upward motion than simply floating the tremolo at an angle off the body, and it made it easy to perform wild “flutter” effects.

A guitar with 24 frets was not unheard of before 1987, but this was still relatively uncommon. The last four frets were scalloped, allowing Vai and like-minded shredders to really lay into those high notes, and upper-fret access was enhanced by a crescent-shaped scoop around the neck joint area.

Later, Lasner asked Vai to explain the guitar specifications further: "'The first thing he did" Lasner explains, "was disassemble them on the spot. Neck from body, pickguard off, tremolo out... took 'em apart. I was shocked, to say the least. But Steve looked at me nonchalantly and said, 'Relax, I do this all the time.' He wanted to check Mace's detail and craftsmanship."" Mace Bailey, who was also involved in the production, later went to Japan to the Ibanez factory to really begin producing the guitar. He sat there with the craftsmen and made ten guitars for Vai.

== Naming conventions ==
Ibanez has not revealed much about the naming system of the JEM models(JEMxxx) but letters always refer to the name of the color pattern used for each models (JEM777LNG > LochNess Green). However, it is known that the number 7 came from Steve Vai himself as he likes the number 7. Steve Vai has also released an album titled "The Seventh Song" which contains ballad songs from previous albums. Steve Vai stated on the CD cover, "Traditionally, I have made the 7th song on all my CDs the mellifluous guitar ballad that serves the melody on a silver platter. In numerology, the number 7 is shrouded in mystique. In a record sequence, it has always felt like the sweet spot. These songs are more devotional in nature than technical. They are a reflection of one man's desire to expose a glimmer of the depth of his longing for spiritual communion."

There are five JEM sub-model numbers: 7, 77, 777, 505 and 555. JEM777 was the first JEM sub-model, created in 1987. Currently Ibanez no longer sells this model, thus some of these models are quite rare, especially the JEM777LNG, which was a limited run and each model was hand-signed by Steve Vai. On the other hand, JEM77 models are more widely available compared to the JEM777 guitars. Some of the 77 models are very easy to make out and are especially interesting for collectors-these are models with a floral or multicolor pattern, for example, the JEM77FP (Floral Pattern) and the JEM77PMC (Purple MultiColor). However, a variant of JEM77, the JEM77BRMR is not a multicolor guitar, but it has dot inlays on the fingerboard and a "rock mirror" finish and the 77VBK, which is basic black with a mirror pickguard and the vine inlay. The JEM 7 series was derived from Steve's current main guitar, "Evo", with the 7VWH being the longest run production model of all JEM guitars and still in production today. Different from other JEM models, JEM555 is produced in Korea and in terms of quality, this variant is considered by many to be poorer than the others. As of 2008, the only production model JEM guitars are the 7VWH and the 77VBK. The cheaper Korean- made 555 was discontinued in 2000 for the USA market. In 2008 there were more models than the 7vwh and 7vbk.

== Models and variations ==
=== JEM Anniversary ===
There are four sub-models of the JEM Anniversary.

==== JEM10TH ====
The model was created for JEM's tenth anniversary in 1997, although production started in 1996. "This sub-model of Anniversary JEM includes numbered letter of authenticity hand-signed by Steve Vai. The aluminum pickguard has an engraved vine and its JEM10 serial number. JEM10s designated for the USA have a silver tweed JEM case with outside plaque and inner silk screened protective shroud. Later numbered JEM10s going to the USA have their JEM10 plaque screwed onto the case, instead of riveted/glued on." There are 852 JEM10 guitars around the globe (210 of them are in the United States), and each guitar has its own serial number. #1 is at Hoshino USA, #2 is at Roland (Roland/Meinl) in Germany. #003, #005, #007, went for sale in the US, and #009 is in Germany at Sven Asbach and JEM10 #016 was given away by Steve during G3.

==== JEM90HAM ====
HAM stands for Hoshino Anniversary Model, which was made for the 90th Anniversary of Hoshino. The specifications are similar to the JEM10 model, as both use the same type of wood, pickups, hardware and tremolos. There were exactly 72 guitars brought by Ibanez to the US of the 831 available worldwide.

==== JEM2KDNA ====
The most notable aspect is the color, as Vai added his DNA (blood) to the mixture of the paint. The painter of the guitar, Darren Michaels/Darren Johansen of ATD (About Time Designs), stated on Jemsite.com, "For the record if you own a DNA you have a good amount of the "DNA". The "blood red" paint that I mixed was mixed at a ratio of approximately 8:1 [paint:blood] so the content is quite high. There had to be pigment mixed into the paint to hold it onto the guitar as well as a carrier. If you purchase a canvas you get a picture of myself and someone mixing [the blood] in to the color. Also a picture of the room we did the guitars in too. The canvases also have the same content as I mixed all the DNA left into the paint when I left Japan and brought the paint back with me . I hope this clears things up for you" The guitars were made in the year 2000, represented in the model series, JEM2KDNA (2000). Around the world, there are exactly 300 guitars.

==== JEM20TH ====
In 2007 Ibanez announced the 20th Anniversary JEM guitar. This guitar is made of acrylic with multicolor paint streaks running through it. When the tone control is pulled up a set of green LEDs light up within the body.

==== JEM30TH ====
The 30th Anniversary Reissue 777 model is in production. There are exactly 777 JEM777LNG (which stands for "Loch Ness Green") guitars around the world, which is also the first variant produced.

=== JEM7 ===
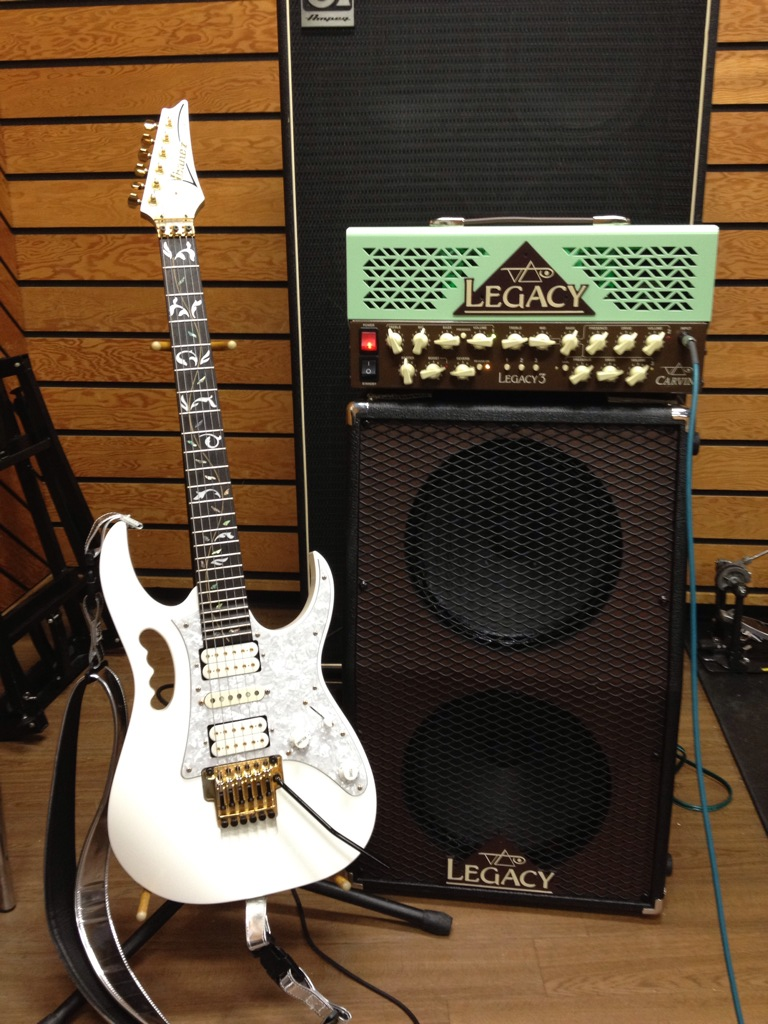
Ibanez JEM 7VWH

From six different variants, currently Ibanez produces only the JEM7VWH series as it was Steve Vai's main guitar that he used for live performances. Steve Vai has one JEM7VWH with exactly the same specification as the guitars on the market, which he named "Evo". The main features of JEM7 variants are the monkey grip, which are located above the pickups and the scalloped fingerboard that applies from the 21st fret up to the 24th. This series is also equipped with DiMarzio Evolution pickups. In 2003, the 7VWH specifications were changed from an ebony fingerboard to a rosewood fingerboard. According to Ibanez officials, this was done because "Evo" and "Flo" also had their necks changed to rosewood fingerboards.

Complete list of JEM7 variants:

- JEM7RB - dot inlays, Root Beer, American Basswood body (production 1988,1989)
- JEM7PBK - disappearing pyramid inlays, Pearl Black, American Basswood body (production 1989,1990)
- JEM7VWH - vine inlay, White, Alder body (production 1993–2019)
- JEM7BSB - screw head inlays, Burnt Stained Blue, American Basswood body (production 1996 - 1998)
- JEM7DBK - screw head inlays, Black with texture, American Basswood body (production 1999 - 2004)
- JEM7VSBL - Blue vine inlay, Sparkle Blue, Alder body (production 2002 - 2004)
- JEM7EAFX - fixed bridge, vine inlay, Black, American Basswood body (production 2009)
- JEM7VLWH - vine inlay, White, Alder body (production 2009) Lefthand model of the JEM7VWH
- JEM7V7 - vine inlay, White, Alder body - Seven-string variant of the JEM7VWH - features DiMarzio Blaze II pickups and a Lo-Pro Edge 7 bridge (production 2013 - 2016)
- JEM7VPWH - It is produced in Indonesia as part of the mid-tier Premium series (production 2019–present)

=== JEM77 ===
The older 77 guitars use the DiMarzio PAF Pro pickups, where the new 77BRMR (discontinued) and the 77VBK (discontinued) are equipped with DiMarzio Breed pickups. Steve Vai used to use the JEM77BRM model as his other main gear, named "MOJO". Steve's version of the 77BRMR has a few modifications that are not in the production model, such as blue LED light fingerboard inlays. The 77FP and 77BFP featured a flower pattern, that was a real fabric, put over the black painted guitar body and then clearcoated onto the guitar. The 77FP was re-issued as the 15th anniversary model, with exactly the same specs as the older 77FP. The 77BFP is the only JEM with vine inlay on a maple fingerboard. The new Flower Pattern is the 2010 release of Ibanez, the Ibanez Jem77FP2, it features a basswood body clad in actual floral pattern fabric chosen specifically by Steve, and then clear-coated. The guitar features a 5pc maple and walnut neck with a rosewood fingerboard, and vine neck inlay with red accents to match the body design.

Complete list of JEM77 variants:

- JEM77FP - vine inlay, Flower Pattern, American Basswood body (years of production 1988 - 2003)
- JEM77BFP - vine inlay, maple fingerboard, Blue Flower Pattern, American Basswood body (production 1991 - 1994)
- JEM77GMC - vine inlay, Green Multi Color, American Basswood body (production 1992 - 1993)
- JEM77PMC - disappearing pyramid inlay, Purple Multi Color, American Basswood body (production 1992 - 1993)
- JEM77BRMR - dot inlay, Black Rock Mirror, American Basswood body (production 2005 - 2006)
- JEM77VBK - vine inlay, Black, American Basswood body (production 2007–2011)
- JEM77FP2 - Tree of life vine inlay, Flower Pattern 2, American Basswood body (2010 – 2018)
- JEM77WDP CNL (aka Woody) - vine inlay, Wood Pickguard (w/ Wood Knobs), Rosewood top/Mahogany Body (2016–present)
- JEM77PBFP - made in Indonesia as part of the Premium line (production 2015–present)

=== JEM777 ===
The JEM777 variants are the oldest variants among all JEM models. Currently a 30th Anniversary Reissue 777 model is in production. There are exactly 777 JEM777LNG (which stands for "Loch Ness Green") guitars around the world, which is also the first variant produced. One of the most noted users of these was the late Denis D'Amour of Canadian band Voivod.The Loch Ness Green guitars were also hand signed by Steve Vai. From a technical point of view, all JEM777 guitars have more or less the same specifications with the other two JEM models (JEM7 and JEM77) . All Jem777LNGs have been signed and numbered by Steve Vai, some have a handwritten graphic underneath. GreenJem.com tracks the original green jems and to date has located 156 of them.

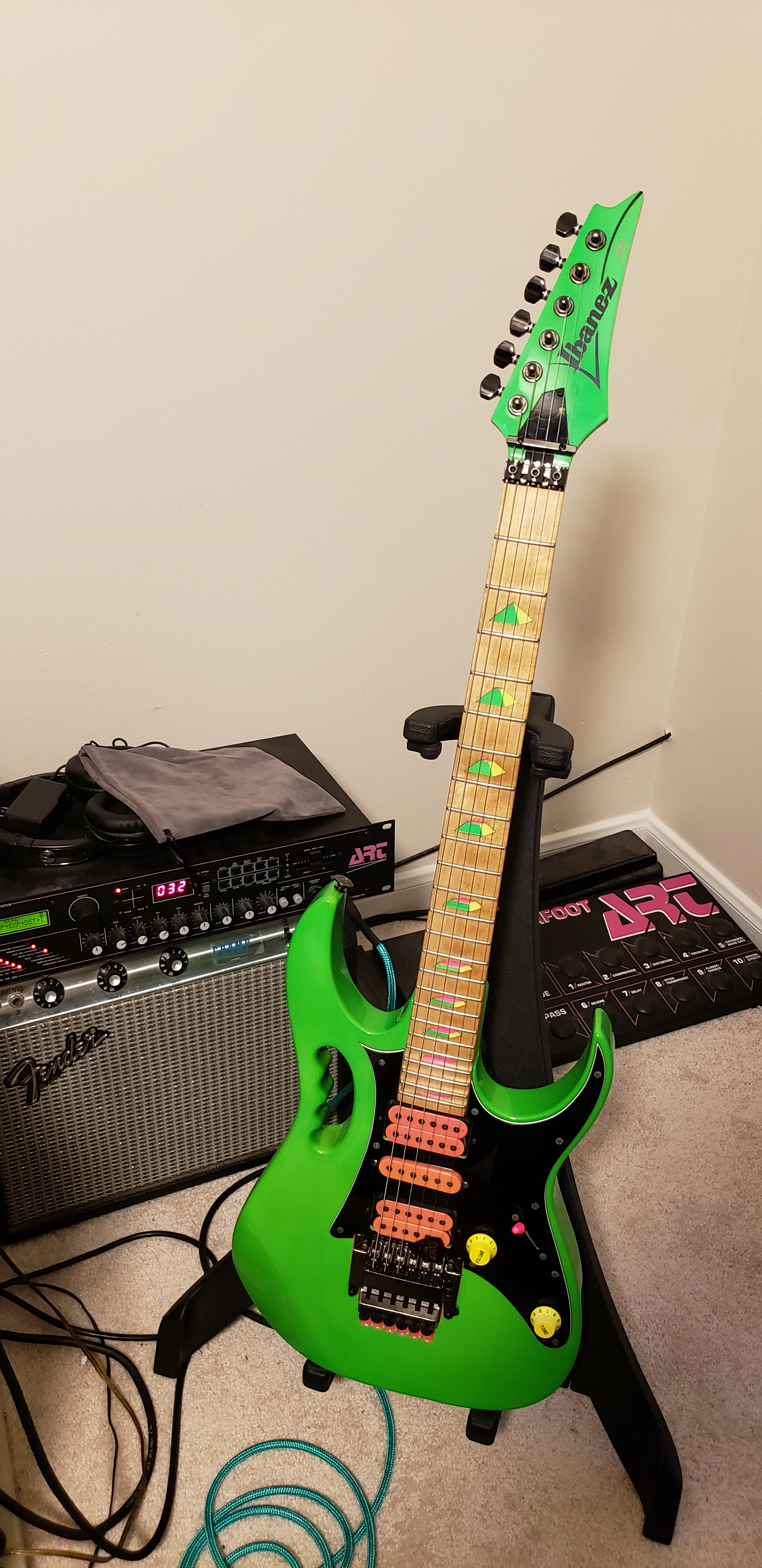
Original 1987 JEM 777LNG

Complete list of JEM777 variants:

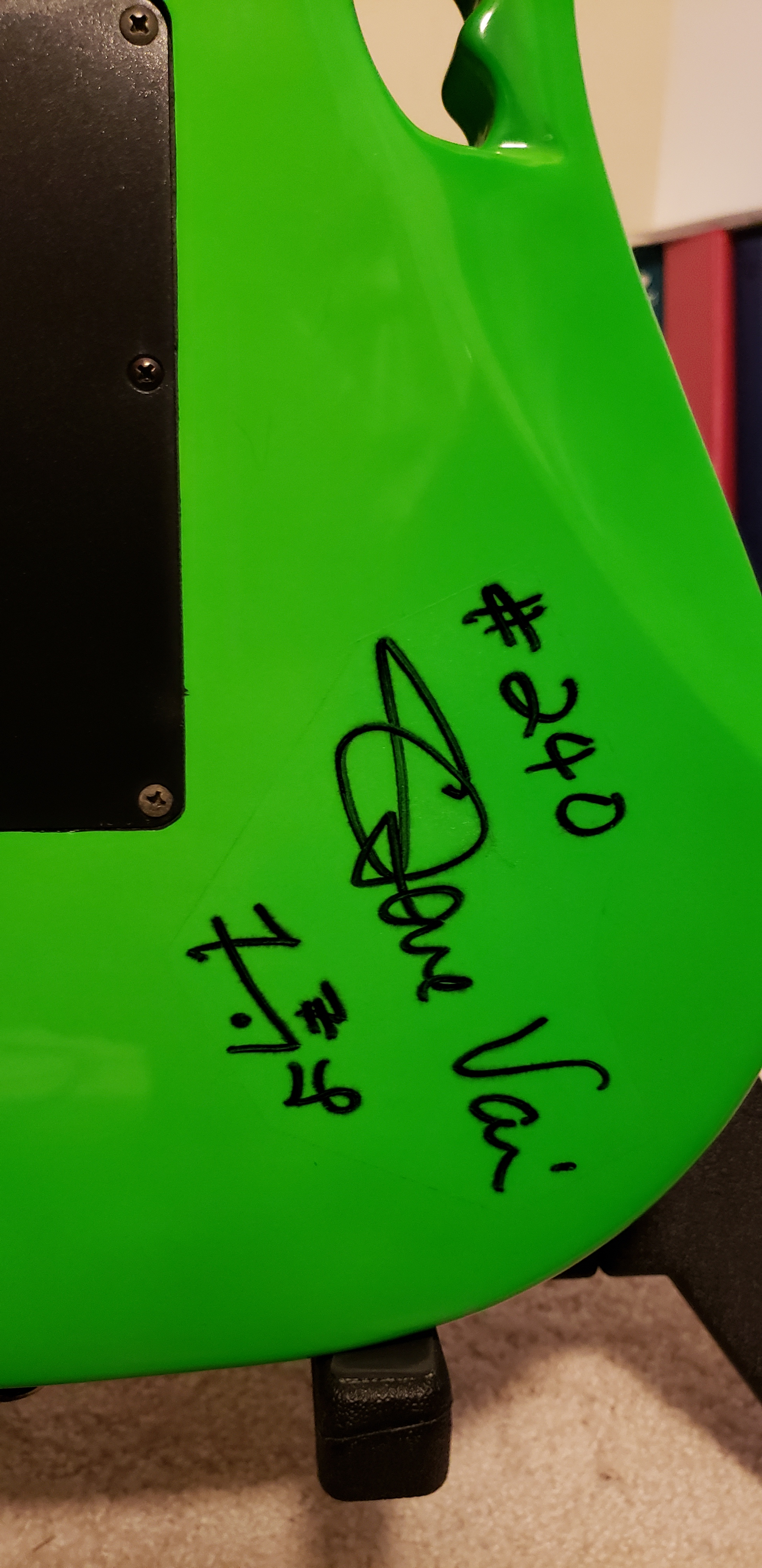
- Vai signature number and glyph on original JEM 777LNG
  JEM777LNG - disappearing pyramid inlay, Loch Ness Green, American Basswood body, personalized signature (years of production 1987)
- JEM777DY - disappearing pyramid inlay, Desert Sun Yellow, American Basswood body ( years of production 1987 - 1996)
- JEM777SK - disappearing pyramid inlay, Shocking Pink, American Basswood body ( years of production 1987 - 1989)
- JEM777VBK - vine inlay, Black, American Basswood body (years of production 1988 - 1992)
- JEM777VDY - vine inlay, Desert Sun Yellow, American Basswood body ( years of production 1989 - 1991)
- JEM777VSK - vine inlay, Shocking Pink, American Basswood body ( year of production 1989)

=== JEM 555 ===
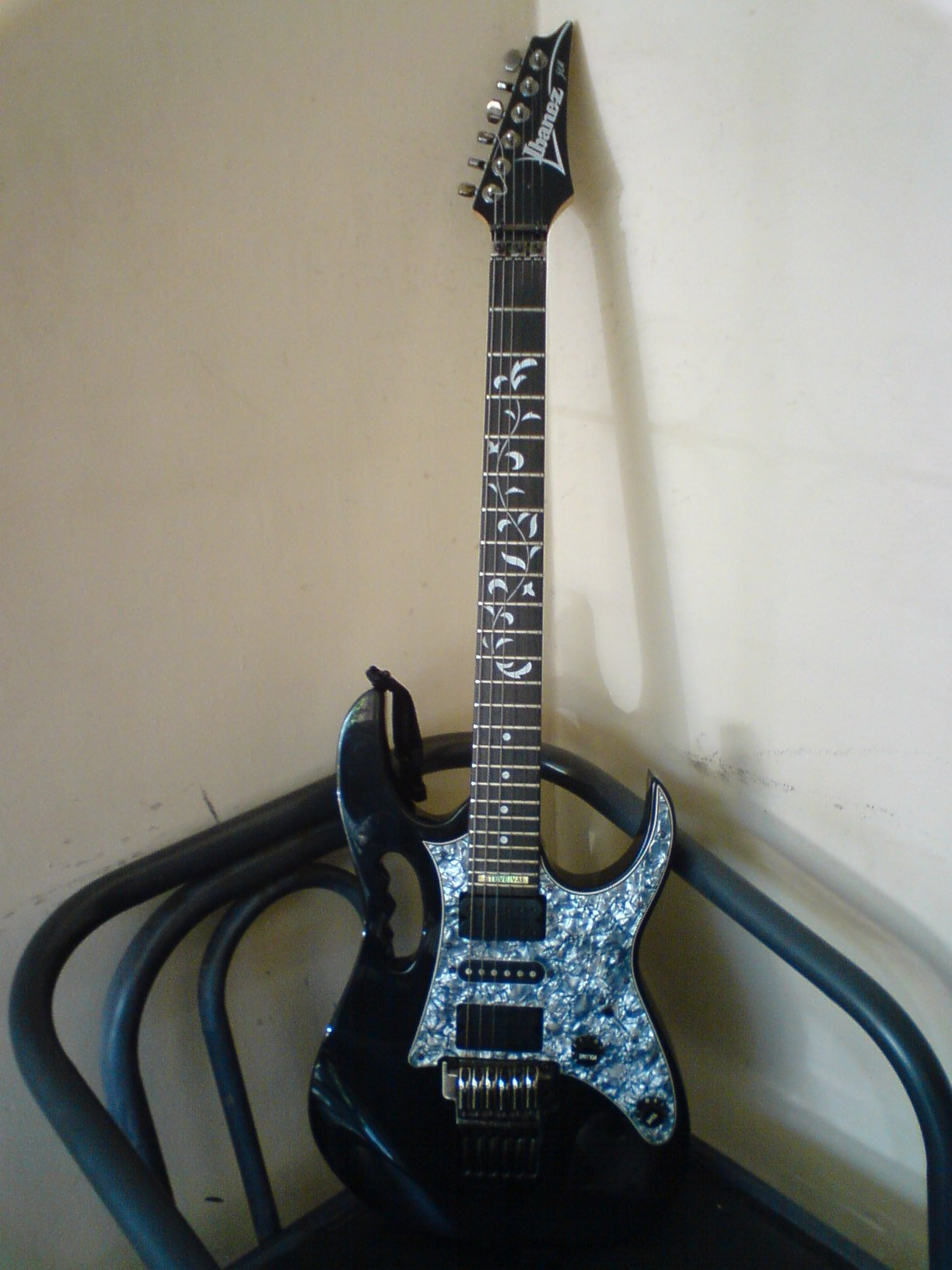
Ibanez JEM 555 BK, 2003 model

All the JEM555 variants are not widely available in the United States currently, as Ibanez received a great deal of negative feedback from consumers. However, in 2000, the variants have been reintroduced in many different countries thanks to high demand. Unlike the other JEM variants, the 555s are Korean-made rather than Japanese and are of lower quality and specs. Most years have the script JEM Jr. on the headstock.

Complete list of JEM555 variants:

- JEM555BK - vine/ dot inlay, Black, American Basswood body (years of production 1994–2000)
- JEM555WH - vine/ dot inlay, White, American Basswood body (years of production 1994–present)
- JEM555LWH - vine/ dot inlay, White, American Basswood body (years of production 1997 - 1999)

=== JEM 505 ===
The JEM505, similar to the JEM555, was meant to be a more affordable alternative made in Japan, passing on features such as inlays, scalloped frets, and the higher-end DiMarzio pickups.

Complete list of JEM505 variants:

- JEM505BK - black dot inlay, Black, Basswood body, v7, s1, v8 pickups (years of production 2010–2011)
- JEM505WH - black dot inlay, White, Basswood body, v7, s1, v8 pickups (years of production 2010–2011)

=== JEM 333 ===
These are currently only available in East Asian and South American countries. In essence it is an RG350EX with the monkey grip, using the same Infinity pickups instead of DiMarzio pickups that even the JEM555 used, and the Ibanez Edge III tremolo.

(There are known to be companies based in China producing counterfeit JEM copies. These are cheaply made and are sometimes sold on US auction sites. Generally referred to as "Chibanez" models in the US, these are not to be confused with the authentic Ibanez JEM333 models.)

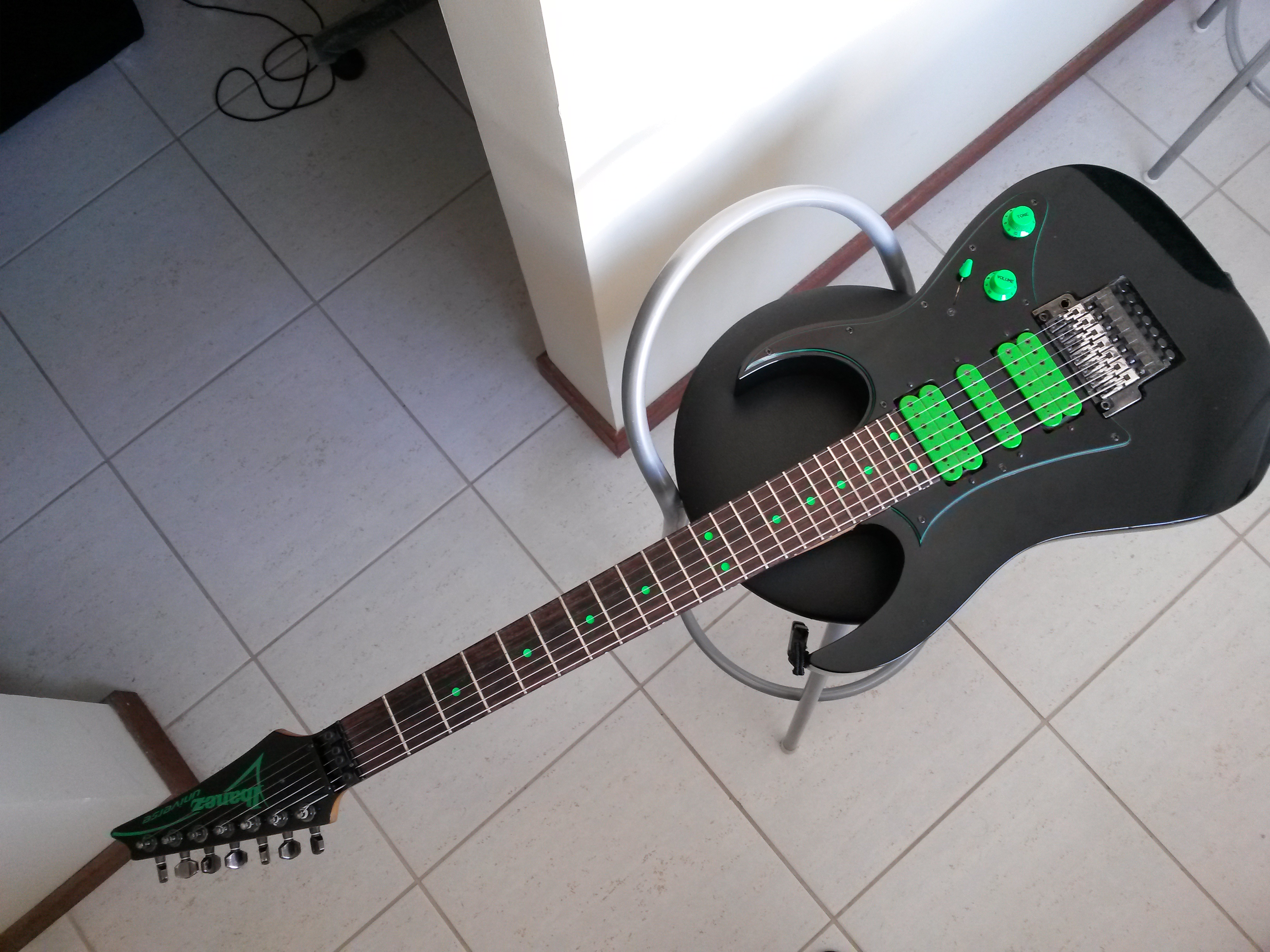
Ibanez Universe UV7BK, 1996 model

=== Universe 7-string ===
The Universe series is not a JEM sub-model. It was designed from the start as its own model separate from the JEM despite its similarities.

== Pickups ==
From 1987 to 1992 all Ibanez JEM models came standard with a DiMarzio PAF PRO (Humbucker) neck pickup in the neck position, a DiMarzio PAF PRO (Humbucker) bridge pickup in the bridge position, and a DiMarzio JEM (Single Coil) in the middle position.

In 1993 the JEM7VWH was introduced. One of the new features of this guitar was the new DiMarzio EVOLUTION (hence the guitar also being known as EVO) pickups in the neck and bridge position, but the DiMarzio JEM middle pickup was still featured on the model introduced in 1993. This pickup configuration was standard on all JEM7's, JEM77's, and special edition JEM's from 1993 to 1998 (JEM777's were not produced after 1992). A slightly different pickup configuration has been featured of JEM555 models ever since their original production in 1994, JEM555 feature an EVOLUTION middle pickup in addition to the EVOLUTION neck and bridge pickups (a feature that was not standard on other JEM's with EVOLUTION pickups until later in the JEM's history).

In 1999 the JEM7DBK was the first JEM with DiMarzio BREED pickups.

The JEM7VSBL which was originally produced in 2002 was the first JEM that was not a JEM555 to feature a DiMarzio EVOLUTION single coil pickup in the middle position.

All JEM's introduced in 2003 or after have either all Dimarzio EVOLUTION or BREED pickups except for the JEM-JR (JEM333), the JEM20th, and the JEM505.

The Acrylic JEM20th featured DiMarzio TranceJEM pickups.

The JEM505 has Ibanez v7, s1, v8 pick ups.

== See also ==
- Ibanez JS Series
- Ibanez RG
