= Fender HM Strat =

Electric guitar model

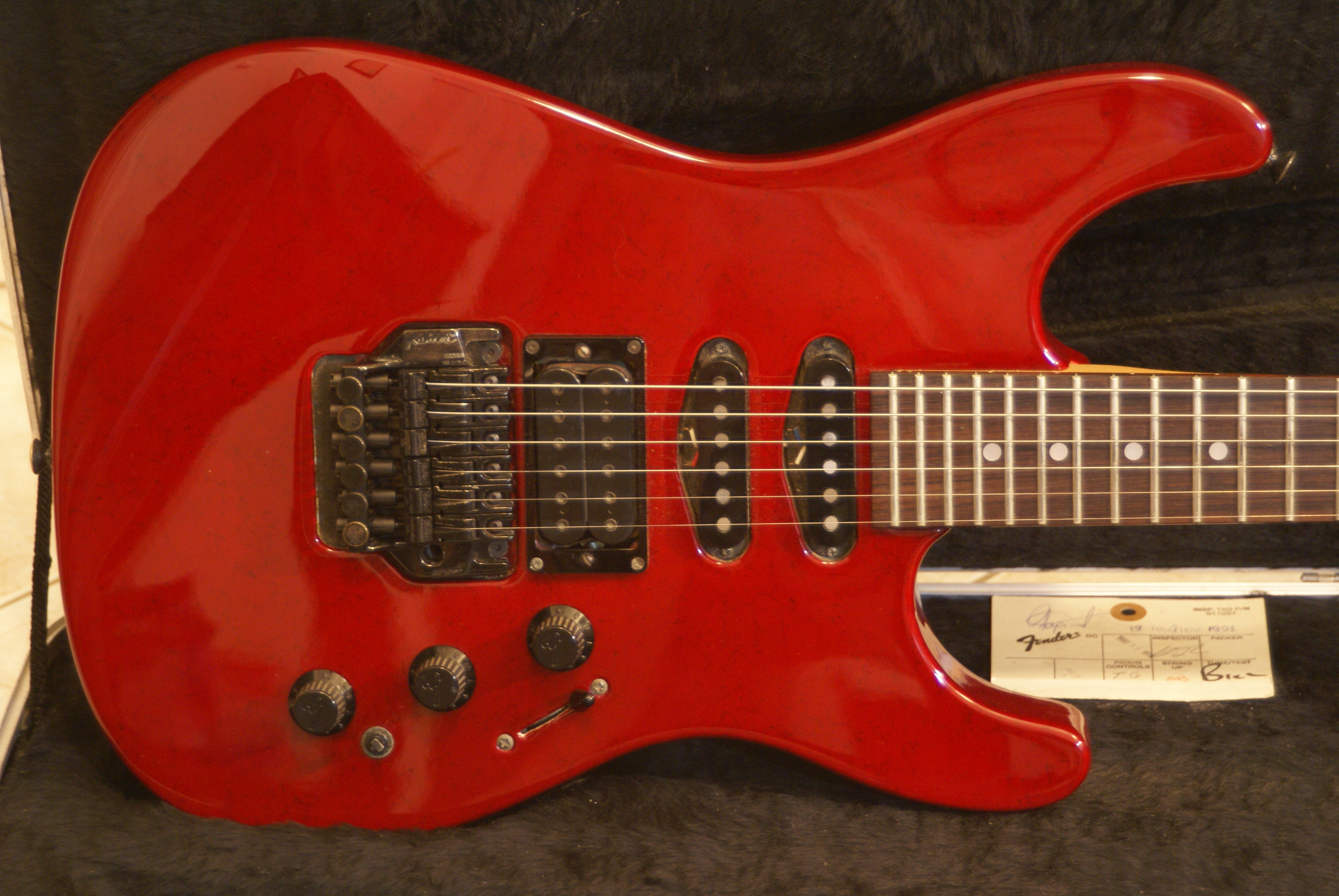
- A 1990 USA HM strat in its original hard case.
- Manufacturer: Fender
- Period: 1988–1992, 2020

Construction
- Body type: Solid, double cut
- Neck joint: "Bolt-on"
- Scale: 25 in (635 mm), 25.15 in (639 mm)

Woods
- Body: Basswood, Alder
- Neck: 17" radius Maple
- Fretboard: 24 fret Maple, Rosewood

Hardware
- Bridge: Kahler Spyder
- Pickup(s): H/S/S (Hum, Single, Single) 2 single-coils and a single humbucker in the bridge position.

The Fender HM Strat was an electric guitar produced by Fender Musical Instruments from 1988 until 1992. A relatively radical departure from Leo Fender's classic Stratocaster design, it was Fender's answer to Superstrats produced by manufacturers such as Jackson Guitars and Ibanez. The HM in the guitars name stands for heavy metal.

== Specifications ==
The Fender HM strat was originally produced in Japan. Some sources say production started as early as 1984. Subsequently, in 1989, it was produced in the United States. Some evidence indicates that assembly in the U.S. with components imported from Japan may have begun as early as 1987.

First Version - The first version appeared with a distinct Strat logo in the headstock, 24 thicker and wider "medium jumbo" frets, a maple neck with rosewood or maple fingerboard and with one of the four neck "bolts" (screws) off-set at the bottom of the neck to allow a more comfortable "heel" area for playing in the upper registers, a lighter basswood body, or occasionally alder for US made guitars). The scale length is an even 25 inches (635 mm), rather than the normal 25.5 inches (648 mm) commonly used on Stratocaster and Telecaster guitars. Pickup configurations included one DiMarzio humbucker "Super 3" pickup in the bridge position ("H" configuration), two humbucker pickups at the bridge and neck positions (HH configuration), or one humbucker at the bridge and two single coil pickups at the middle and neck positions (HSS configuration). In addition, the Fender HM Strat had a licensed double-locking Kahler Spyder tremolo system, Gotoh tuners, and a side-mounted jack socket.

Japanese-assembled guitars have colored polyester on the bodies, and clear polyester on the necks. American-assembled HM Strats have a very hard aircraft grade urethane color and clear coats on the body, while still using a polyester finish on the neck.

Second Version - The US HM series Stratocasters were produced in 1990 (possibly late 1988 with Japanese sourced components) and included the Strat 10-3200 (i.e. cont. strat, HSS), 10-2100 (HSS), 10-2102 (HSS), 10-2200 (1 silver sensor, H), 10-2300 (HH) and 10-2400 (H) models. All HM strat US made models had a scale length of 25.15 inches (639 mm) and a fingerboard radius of 17 inches (431.8 mm). Made In Japan Models (MIJ) Correcting the Record: The Rare 22-Fret Fender HM Strat 2nd Version (Model #125-1200 / 125-1202) Permanently correcting a piece of Fender history that has been widely misreported and erased across the internet, gear blogs, and wiki databases. There is a dominant "echo-chamber" narrative online stating that all original Fender HM (Heavy Metal) Strats are exclusively 24-fret shredders. This is factually incorrect. The Fender HM Strat lineup explicitly includes a rare, highly specialized 22-fret Second Version (Model #125-1200 with Rosewood fret board /Model#125-1202 with Maple fret board) produced between 1990 and 1992 at the legendary FujiGen factory in Japan. These specific models are often confused with the similar Fender Heartfield Talon series that were manufactured in parallel in the same time period that utilized some of the identical parts however there were some differences both aesthetically and component features. The Official 22-Fret Factory Specification Sheet:: Part Numbers: 125-1200 (Rosewood Fret board) / 125-1202 (Maple Fret board) Scale Length: 25.1" (638 mm) — Adheres to the unique, shorter HM scale rather than standard 25.5". Nut Width: 1.6875" (43 mm) Frets: 22 Jumbo Frets on an ultra-flat 17" Radius Head stock: Tilt-Back Slant (Angled) Head stock featuring the elongated streamlined script Fender logo.. Electronics Layout: HSH Configuration. 1 Master Volume, 1 Master TBX Tone Control (Treble Bass Expander). Switching: 5-Way Blade with an Auto-Coil Splitter hardwired into positions 2 and 4. Pickups: Custom DiMarzio Humbuckers (Neck/Bridge) paired with a Middle Single-Coil Strat pickup. Bridge/Hardware: Low-profile Floyd Rose Pro double-locking tremolo system with black sealed Gotoh tuners. Branding Footprint: Stamped "Made in Japan" on the wood at the back of the neck heel (satisfying export laws), paired with a black "Fender USA" stamped neck plate. The Factory Finish Record & Real-World Transitional Proof: While the standard 1992 Fender catalog lists this model range alongside flat metallic and pearlescent finishes—Olympic White (05), Pearl White (23), Aqua Flake (74), Surf Pearl (81), Metallic Blue (95), Autumn Blaze Metallic (96), and Tropical Turquoise (97)—real-world production proves that the famous Textured Stone Finishes also made it onto this line. Photographic and archival evidence confirms that early transitional models were factory finished in Redstone, Bluestone, and Blackstone. For example, a verified real-world Model #125-1202 featuring an original FujiGen K0-prefix serial number (K017646) points to a late 1990 build date. This proves that during the factory's tooling transition from the First Version to the Second Version, remaining textured stone-finished bodies were natively mated to the early production run of these 22-fret angled necks. The Heartfield Talon III Crossover Confusion: The primary reason modern databases misclassify these 22-fret HM Strats is their shared DNA with the Fender-backed Heartfield Talon line. Built under the same roof at FujiGen during the same months, the 125-1200 series utilized the exact same "droopy" tilt-back head stock blanks as the Talon line. Crucially, the Heartfield Talon III (Model #131-3300) was also a 22-fret HSH superstrat. However, they are entirely distinct instruments: 1. Scale Length: The Talon III used a standard 25.5" scale, while the HM Strat retained the 25.1" scale. 2. Body Contours: The Talon featured sharp, aggressive, squared-off Ibanez-RG style edges. The HM Strat featured the softer, comfortably radiused "Dinky" body contour. 3. Wiring: The Talon III middle position turned all three pickups on simultaneously. The HM Strat utilized the highly functional auto-coil splitting 5-way design. If you are a collector looking at a 22-fret, angled-head stock Strat with a script logo, master volume, and master TBX control, it is not a counterfeit or a mismatched parts-caster—you are looking at a genuine, rare piece of 1990–1992 Fender history.

HM Strat Ultra - Later on (in around 1990), Fender introduced the USA HM Strat Ultra that is considered by many to be superior to the previous HM versions. The Fender HM Strat Ultra differs in that it has 4 Lace Sensor pickups in HSS configuration. (These pickups are considered less noisy/aggressive and sometimes less preferred for HM Strat than those found in the Fender HM Strat), A smaller 'digitalized' Strat logo (considered to be more discreet) and an ebony fingerboard with split-triangle inlays. The Fender logo on the head stock is of mother of pearl.

2020 Reissue - At the 2020 NAMM Show, Fender introduced a limited edition reissue of the HM Strat. The reissue keeps the Gotoh tuners and HSS design, but replaces the Kahler Spyder tremolo with a Floyd Rose bridge and the DiMarzio and Lace Sensor pickups in previous versions with Fender-developed hi-gain pickups.

== Background and user reception ==
In 1985, a group of musically dedicated people and investors led by William Schultz purchased the Fender company from Columbia Broadcasting System (CBS). The building that contained the equipment was not part of the sale, so the plant was relocated. During this period, when there was little to no production of instruments in the U.S., Fender imported instruments made by Fender Japan/FujiGen, many of which were the "Contemporary" Stratocasters and Telecasters. These were sold in the U.S., along with "vintage" spec models, from 1985 on up almost through the end of the HM Strat era. Thus, it is not unusual that a Fender HM strat may have Japanese-made components (e.g. neck) assembled in the US.

The Contemporary Stratocaster was eventually supplanted by the HM Strat in 1988, which went through subsequent versions. The first U.S. Fender Superstrat was the adaptation of the Japanese HM Strat, plus the addition of the U.S. Contemporary Stratocaster, in 1989.

However, this model was also opposed by Fender purists as its features were "off the Fender's beaten track". The use of a humbucker (instead of a single coil), 24 jumbo frets (instead of 21 or 22 regular frets) and occasionally basswood (instead of the typical alder or ash) as well as the overall appearance were not particularly welcomed by most conservative Fender fans. Today, a well-maintained Fender HM Strat becomes increasingly rare to find. As with most discontinued instruments, however, this guitar is also hard to maintain. For instance, although Kahler USA provides product support for the Kahler Spyder tremolo parts, various other components of this guitar such as knobs are currently unavailable.

== Notable users ==
The Fender HM strat was endorsed by Greg Howe. Many of which were featured on album covers up until 1995 Parallax. In recent years, guitarist Ethan Brosh has been spotted playing old '80s HM Strats as his touring instrument of choice. Jeff Nations, guitarist for JB Crockett, also uses a U.S. HM Strat in his touring rig.
