= Heartfield =

American guitar manufacturer

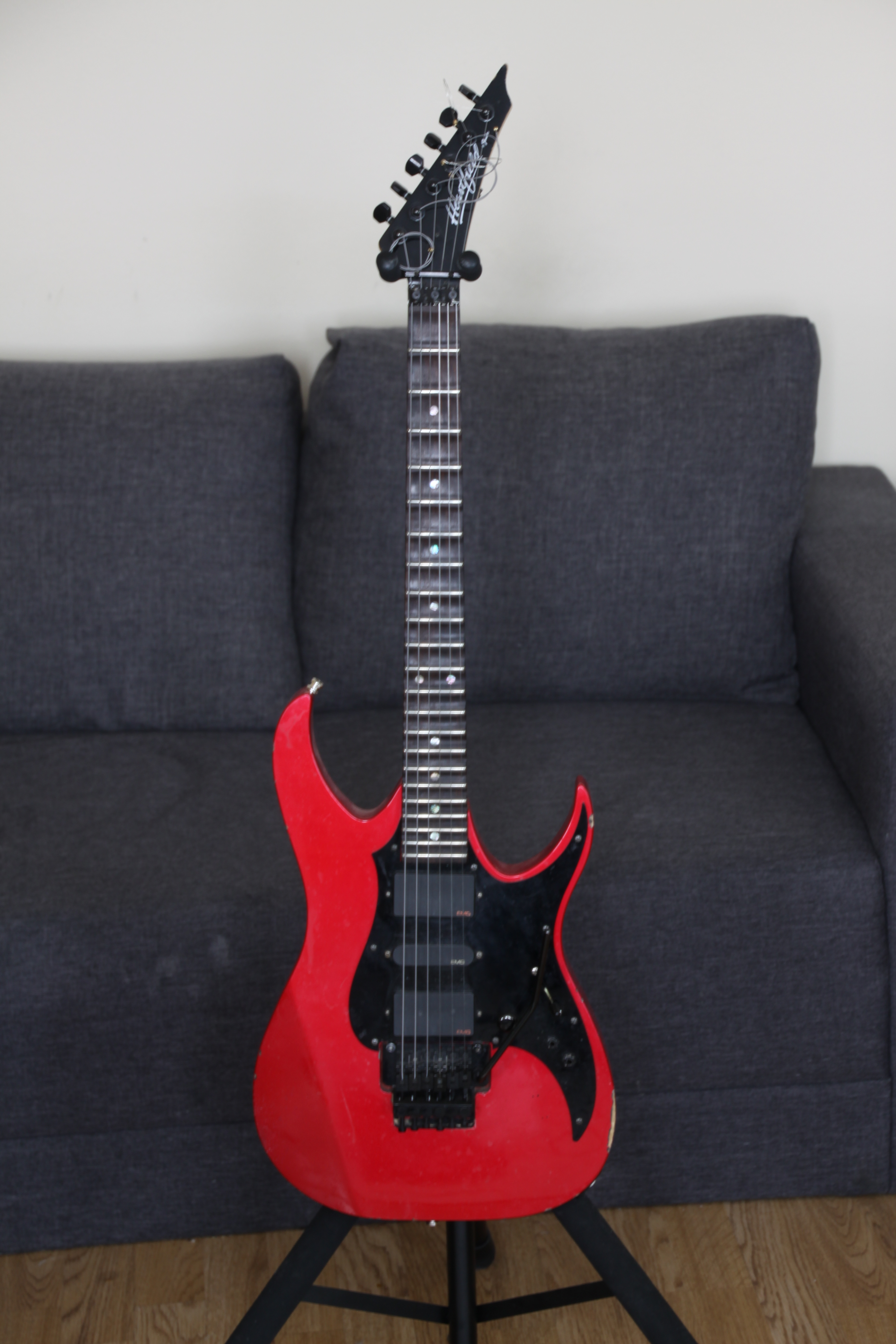
Heartfield superstrat with EMG 89-pair and SA in the middle.

Heartfield was a short-lived American guitar manufacturing company, active from 1989 to 1993.

The company was a joint operation between the American and the Japanese branches of Fender Musical Instruments Corporation. Guitars were manufactured in Japan. Heartfield produced four models of guitars, each with various sub-model categories. The core models consisted of the RR, Elan, EX, and Talon. The RR series was one of the first to offer retro styling while the Talon was a more mass-produced line targeting metal and hard rock guitarists. Some of the models had active electronics, including built-in effects.

The Talon line of Heartfield guitars is a 'superstrat' design (a portmanteau of super and Stratocaster,) including a double-locking Floyd Rose Tremolo, a combination of single coil and humbucker pickups, jumbo frets, thin radius neck, and was aimed primarily at the heavy metal and hard rock genre. Despite a reputable build quality for having been made in the same factory as the Ibanez JEM guitar line, the Talon series incurred high sale prices that discouraged overall sales. At the time, sale prices for the high-end Talon V guitar were listed at US$1169.99. The lack of sales was compounded by the failing value of the Japanese yen in the early 1990s compared to the US Dollar. Add to this the overall decline in popularity of superstrat guitars through the early 1990s, as non-metal genres such as grunge and alternative gained popularity. Heartfield was forced to end operations in 1993.

== Endorsers ==
Notable musicians who have endorsed Heartfield models include:

- Vinnie Moore (UFO)
- Russ Parrish (Fight, Steel Panther)
- Jeff Pilson (Foreigner, Dokken)
