= Super Distortion =

Guitar pickup from DiMarzio

DiMarzio Super Distortion
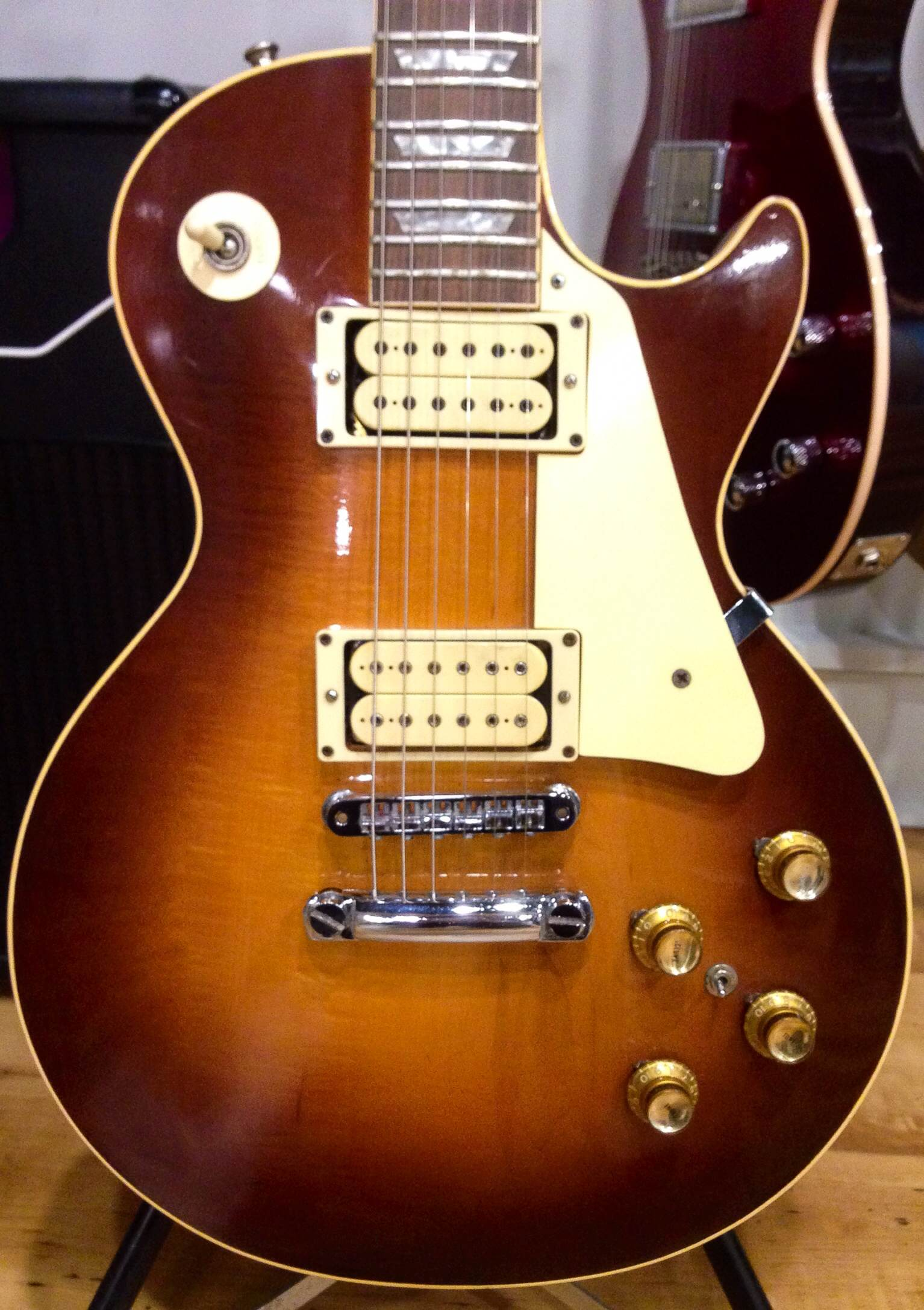
- Manufacturer: DiMarzio
- Period: 1972-present
- Type: Passive humbucker
- Magnet type: Ceramic

The Super Distortion is an electric guitar pickup produced by DiMarzio. Prior to the Super Distortion's release in 1972, pickups from guitar makers like Fender and Gibson had not been designed with distortion in mind, an issue that New York City-based guitar repairman Larry DiMarzio sought to remedy with the Super Distortion, a significantly higher-output, coverless humbucker that fitted directly into the pickup mounts of a Gibson Les Paul. In creating this new pickup, DiMarzio pioneered the aftermarket pickup industry and inspired a wider trend of players swapping pickups to find their ideal tone. The Super Distortion's design and increased ability to overdrive an amp proved revolutionary for rock guitar tone, and it has been used by many notable guitarists of the genre, including Ace Frehley, Joe Perry, Randy Rhoads, Dimebag Darrell, and Kurt Cobain.

== History ==
By the early 1970s, New York City-based guitar repairman Larry DiMarzio felt alternatives were needed to the stock pickups being produced by major guitar manufacturers like Fender and Gibson, which had been bought by large corporations that prioritized cutting costs at the expense of product quality. Knowing many rock guitarists sought a way to create more distorted tones at lower volumes and without relying on fuzz pedals, DiMarzio set out to design a new pickup with higher output and a different tonal profile that would appeal to these players—"a rock and roll pickup," as he described it, noting that earlier pickups had not been designed with distortion in mind. He also prioritized this new pickup using similar dimensions to the humbuckers being used in the popular Gibson Les Paul at the time to both minimize installation hassles and allow for owners to return the guitar to stock condition, if desired.

DiMarzio's new pickup, the "Super Distortion," was the result of much trial and error. It used smaller-gauge wire that allowed for more turns per coil, significantly increasing its output—3.54 volts RMS compared to a Gibson P.A.F.'s 1.9—to allow users to drive their amps harder. The Super Distortion also used more powerful ceramic magnets that gave it a brighter tone with a more cutting midrange. Because guitarists were frequently removing the pickup covers from Gibson's humbuckers, DiMarzio omitted them in favor of an open-coil design with cream-colored bobbins, a style that was distinctive to DiMarzio's pickups and which he later trademarked. DiMarzio built the prototype Super Distortion using leftover parts from Bill Lawrence's shop and installed it in the bridge position of a Les Paul to show retailers.

The Super Distortion was quickly embraced by guitarists upon its release in 1972, with early adopters like Ace Frehley of Kiss—who used a Super Distortion in the bridge position of a triple-humbucker-loaded Les Paul Custom—and Joe Perry of Aerosmith. In 1976, DiMarzio began supplying the Super Distortion as the stock bridge pickup for Jackson-Charvel guitar models, and did so later for other emerging brands like B.C. Rich, Hamer, and Dean. In the 1980s, the pickup was used by numerous metal and hard rock players, including Dimebag Darrell, Kerry King, Mick Mars, and Randy Rhoads, while grunge musicians Kurt Cobain and Kim Thayil used it in the 1990s. Jazz-rock fusion guitarists Al Di Meola, Allan Holdsworth, and John Abercrombie were also fans.

In 2014, DiMarzio released Super Distortion models for seven- and eight-string guitars.

== Legacy ==
The Super Distortion was the music industry's first aftermarket pickup, and its success helped usher in a new era of guitarists adhering to a "tinkering lifestyle" in which they constantly modify or upgrade parts on a "never-ending tone quest." Guitar Player described the Super Distortion's high output, ceramic magnet-equipped design as "a revolution that would change the sound of rock guitar."

== Players ==
- John Abercrombie
- Roy Buchanan
- Kurt Cobain of Nirvana
- Dimebag Darrell of Pantera
- Rick Derringer of the McCoys
- Buck Dharma of Blue Öyster Cult
- Al Di Meola
- Elliot Easton of the Cars
- Ace Frehley of Kiss
- Jerry Garcia of the Grateful Dead
- Allan Holdsworth
- Steve Hunter
- Kerry King of Slayer
- Mick Mars of Mötley Crüe
- Ronnie Montrose
- Rick Nielsen of Cheap Trick
- Joe Perry of Aerosmith
- John Petrucci of Dream Theater
- Randy Rhoads of Quiet Riot
- Tom Scholtz of Boston
- Earl Slick
- Paul Stanley of Kiss
- Kim Thayil of Soundgarden
