= Grover Jackson =

American luthier (born 1949)

- Born: July 17, 1949 (age 76); Chattanooga, Tennessee, U.S.
- Occupation: Luthier
- Years active: 1978–present
- Known for: Jackson Guitars; GJ² Guitars

Grover Jackson (born July 17, 1949) is an American luthier best known for designing and making various guitar models at Jackson Guitars, such as Jackson Rhoads and Jackson Soloist during the 1980s.

== Biography ==
Jackson has been making guitars since 1973. In 1978, he started working at Wayne Charvel's guitar repair shop in Covina, California (while using a PO Box in neighboring San Dimas). Since Charvel's shop was almost bankrupted, Charvel eventually sold his interest to Grover Jackson on November 10, 1978, which gave Jackson control of the business and the Charvel brand. In 1980 he also launched the Jackson brand with the Randy Rhoads model.

Although Jackson and Charvel Guitars became popular with the rise of hard rock and heavy metal music in that era, Grover Jackson sold the Jackson/Charvel brand to the Japanese manufacturer IMC (International Music Corporation) of Fort Worth, Texas, in 1989, and eventually left the company in 1990.

From 1993 to 1996, Jackson worked for Washburn USA in Chicago. During this time he designed and supervised the "Chicago MG" and "Mercury" guitar and "Bantam" bass series. These models were advertised as "Grover Jackson's design" along with his photo. He also worked with Dimebag Darrell to design and build his signature guitars (Washburn Dime series). Then he moved on to run the factory and supervise guitar designs for Rickenbacker from 1996 to 1999. This is also the same time Rickenbacker started adopting CNC router operation (late 1996-1997). He also worked with several other manufacturers, such as G&L Musical Instruments, Tacoma Guitars and Sadowsky, throughout the late 1990s to 2000s. In around 2010, he worked for B.C. Rich to design and handcraft "Gunslinger" series guitar model.

In from 2014 to 2015, there was an IndieGoGo crowdfunding campaign to raise money for a documentary film about him. However it failed to reach its $250,000 goal.

In 2018, Jackson starts working with Friedman Amplification and manufacture Friedman brand guitars including pickups based on David Friedman's spec.

== GJ² Guitars ==
In 2011, Jackson co-founded GJ² Guitars in Orange County, California."Premier Guitar: GJ2 Shredder Review". His partner in this venture was former Fender Senior Vice President Jon Gold.

== "Grover Jackson" guitar brand in Asian market ==
In the 1990s, many models were produced as Japanese market exclusives under "Grover Jackson" brand name. However, in this period of time Grover Jackson had nothing to do with the brand name. This was due to "Jackson" brand already being trademarked by another company in Japan and having to have a different name for the market. The "Grover Jackson" line was produced in Japan, in the same factory as the "Jackson Professional" series. There were also some low end models marketed as "Team GJ". "Grover Jackson" brand was later renamed "Jackson Stars". "Jackson Stars" was essentially the same as "Grover Jackson" brand with the same purpose of being a Japanese exclusive line of Jackson guitars.

There were, however, "Grover Jackson" guitars which were made in the Jackson USA Custom Shop. Examples of these were the Artist signature line, which included the Marty Friedman signature Kelly, which was renamed "The Kelly".

Date of these models are identified from headstock as follows;

- From 1991 - 92: Jackson (R)/Grover Jackson (where "Jackson" is large toothpaste logo and "Grover Jackson" portion is attached small letters)
- From 1993 - 94: Jackson /Grover Jackson (R) (same letter configuration other than placement of (R))
- From 1995 - 98: Grover Jackson (R) (where all of it is large toothpaste letters)
