= Fender Contemporary Stratocaster =

Electric guitar model produced by Fender

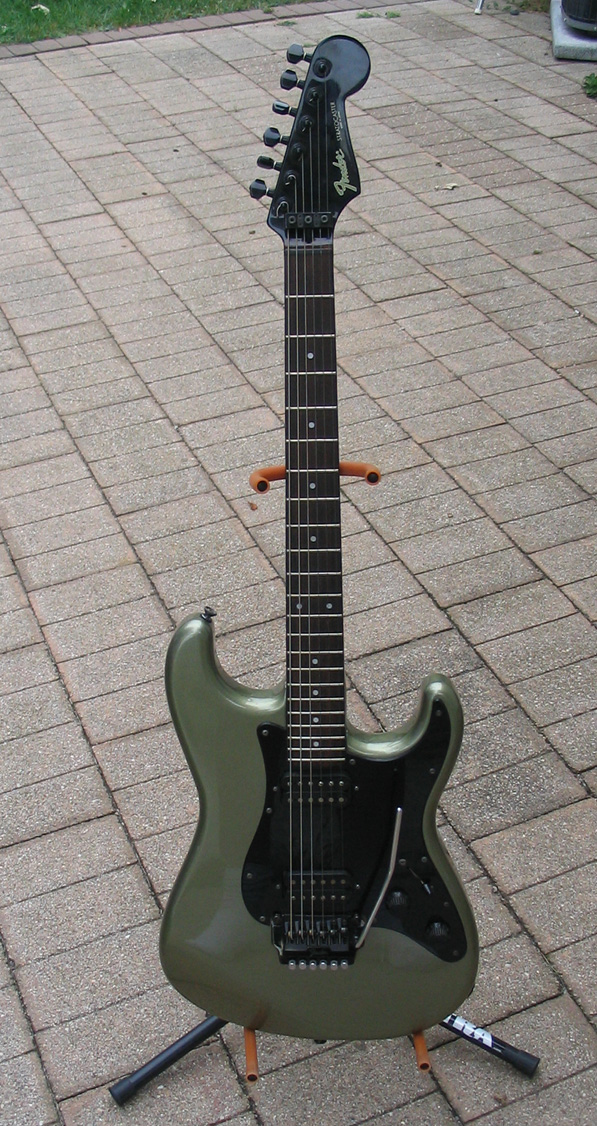
- Manufacturer: Fender Japan
- Period: 1984—1987

Construction
- Body type: Solid
- Neck joint: Bolt-on

Woods
- Body: Alder or Basswood
- Neck: Maple
- Fretboard: Rosewood or Maple

Hardware
- Bridge: Fender Schaller System I, System II, System III Tremolo
- Pickup(s): Variable, see Models

Colors available
- Usually metallic colors. Some models are sunburst.

Fender Contemporary Stratocaster electric guitars were produced by Fender Japan in the 1980s.

== History ==
The Fender Contemporary models were the first Japanese-made Fender models to be exported as Fender Stratocasters and Telecasters. The previous Fender Japan models exported from Japan were all Fender Squier models. The Fender Contemporary models were manufactured from 1984 to 1987 by FujiGen Gakki and these Stratocasters were designed to be superstrats with humbucking pickups and Floyd Rose-like tremolos made by Schaller and Kahler. There was a lower priced Fender Contemporary Squier model produced as well.

When CBS sold Fender to its current owners in 1984, there was a transitional period from 1984 to 1987 with limited Fender USA production resulting in mostly Fender Japan and leftover USA made guitars being sold. There are also Fender Contemporary Telecaster models with HSS or HH pickup configurations and switches for selecting pickup options. The Fender Contemporary Telecaster models used the same tremolo systems as the Fender Contemporary Stratocaster models. Black Francis used a Fender Contemporary Telecaster in the Pixies and Neal Schon played a Contemporary Stratocaster in the music video for Journey's Separate Ways, also the band's first ever video. Justin Broadrick used a black 1985 HSS model in Godflesh for the majority of the 1990s.

There were also USA Contemporary Stratocasters and Telecasters which were totally different than the original Japanese models in terms of features and construction. These short-lived American-made models were made from 1989 to 1991.

== Sources ==
- Fender Contemporary and Standard Series Guitars Manual (Japan)
- 1986/1987 tour of Fujigen factory, Rainer Daeschler
- Fender How can I find out when my Japanese-made instrument was manufactured, Fender
