= Jackson Soloist =

Series of guitars produced by Fender Musical Instruments Corporation

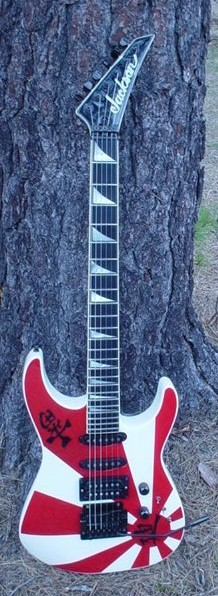
- Manufacturer: Jackson Guitars
- Period: 1984 - Present

Construction
- Body type: Solid
- Neck joint: Neck Thru

Woods
- Body: Alder (standard), Poplar, Mahogany (some models make use of figured maple tops or veneers)
- Neck: Maple (standard), Mahogany
- Fretboard: Ebony (standard), Rosewood (Brazilian rosewood 1984 - early 1985), Maple

Hardware
- Bridge: Floyd Rose (standard), string-thru tune-o-matic, Kahler Tremolo
- Pickup(s): Usually H-S-S or H-H, although various configurations can be ordered

Colors available
- Production models have a pre-determined color or graphic finish, while Custom Shop options are vast

The Jackson Soloist is an electric guitar model introduced by Jackson Guitars in 1984, although prototypes were available before then. The design is a typical "superstrat"; it varies from a typical Stratocaster because of its neck-thru design; tremolo: Floyd Rose or similar, Kahler; or a fixed Tune-O-Matic; premium woods; a deeper cutaway at the lower horn for better access to the higher frets, and a sharper body with squared-off edges.

== History ==
=== San Dimas era (early-mid 1980s) ===
Grover Jackson began developing ideas that would manifest in the Soloist while he was running Charvel. Early examples have set necks, Stratocaster-shaped bodies, Explorer-style headstocks, and often Charvel appointments like vintage tremolos. The general Soloist style continued to evolve after Jackson started his own company. Early Soloist-styled models, called "Custom Strat" or "Neck-Through Body Strat", were typically custom guitars that varied in size, shape, and control placements.

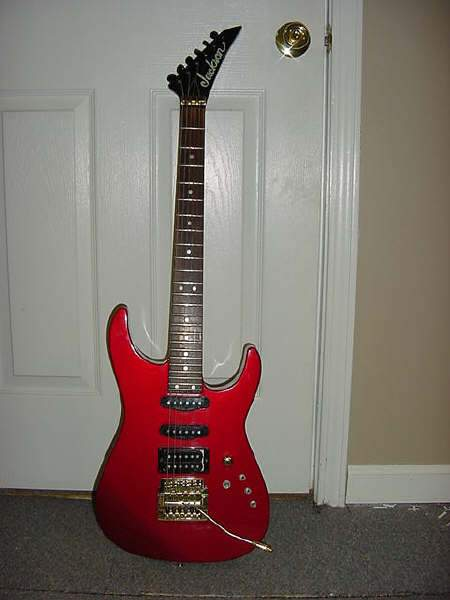
Soloist Student Model

The design had been standardized when the first official Soloist, serial #J0158, was completed on August 28, 1984 (though later serial numbered guitars were completed a week and a half earlier). Customers thenceforth could order variations.

==== Original platforms ====
- The Soloist Custom: standard neck-thru the body, 24 frets, ebony fretboard, "Sharkfin" or dot genuine pearl inlays, binding on the fretboard and headstock.
- The Soloist Student: standard neck-thru the body, 24 frets, rosewood fretboard (Brazilian rosewood 1984 - early 1985), genuine pearl dot inlays, lacks binding on the fretboard and headstock.

The intended meanings of the model designations was to be similar to Gibson Les Paul Standard (Student in this case) and Les Paul Custom. The designations do not make one a lower quality instrument and the two are made in exactly the same fashion.

==== Original options ====
Originally the customer had the choice of 3 different bridges:

- Floyd Rose tremolo;
- Kahler cam tremolo;
- String-thru Tune-o-matic

Pickup options were vast. A customer could get any configuration and any brand. The standard pickup brand was Seymour Duncan until very early 1985 when the company began using in-house wound pickups standard.

Finishes were practically unlimited. While the standard colors were Platinum Pink, Ferrari Red, Ivory and Black, any custom color or airbrushed graphic was available for an upcharge.

Some items changed to help cut costs and speed up production. An example of such a change was in the mid-1980s, when the hand-shaped nibs in the binding beside the frets were discontinued to save time hand-shaving the binding between each fret. In-house manufactured pickups also became standard. Necks were also changed from a laminated style early in the year to a single piece of wood to prevent wood wastage.

=== Ontario era (late 1980s) ===
1986 was the year the company moved from Glendora aka San Dimas and over to Ontario. 1987 they began using a Floyd Rose-styled tremolo made in Asia with their name on the top plate. It was still possible to purchase a Floyd Rose or Kahler tremolo bridge, but the JT-6 Jackson unit was the default. A quick way to differentiate the different bridges was to look at the nut at the furthest end of the fretboard. If the nut was the primary nut with screws that go through the neck to the back, it was a Floyd Rose tremolo equipped from the factory. If the clamp was behind the nut and mounted to the surface, it was equipped with a JT6.

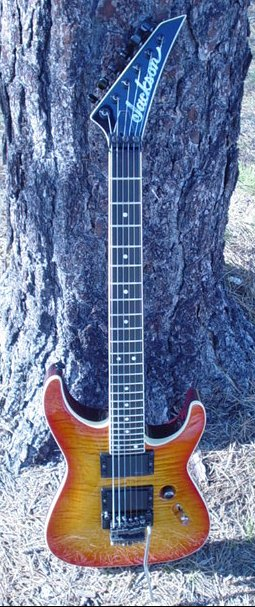
This is a 1987 Soloist archtop. This was made with Brazilian rosewood fretboard, mahogany body and a flamed maple top. It was finished with nitrocellulose lacquer.

Also, the archtop Soloists were introduced. The initial runs were made with Brazilian rosewood fretboards, flamed maple tops and mahogany necks and backs.

Graphic finishes were very popular in this era. The list of common styles is long and unique styles even longer. In-house manufactured pickups became standard in the beginning of 1985, and mid-boost controls were introduced in many guitars.

Pickups were handwound by ex-Fender employee Abigail Ybarra, as discovered by Fender Custom Shop founder John Page who visited Jackson in the early 1990s to purchase their then-unused pickup winding machines and found her working there. She was hired by Jackson in 1985 when the Fender factory closed down and when Fender was sold by CBS to FMIC. The expensive Masterwound pickups were wound by her and possibly the same machine since the mid-late 1980s.

Up to this point these guitars were each made to order and each was given a serial number that matched a detailed work order.

=== Production era (1990s) ===
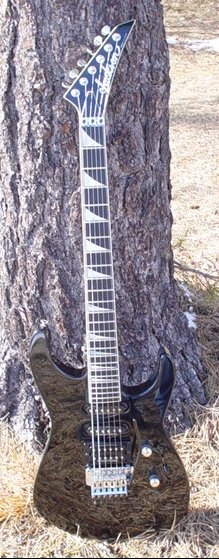
This is a 1998 "Shannon" Soloist. A limited production 'reissue; of sorts hand signed by luthier Mike Shannon.

The next big change occurred in 1990. At this time the company decided to offer Soloists in production runs rather than make them to order. These are marked by the UO serial number code. The J+4 digit number continued on only through the Custom Shop.

Many different models were unveiled through the 1990s. It also saw the introduction of the imported Jackson Soloists at this time. The JT6 tremolos were dropped in favor of the Schaller Floyd Rose style, which are recessed into the face of the body. Later in the decade, genuine Floyd Rose models returned.

== Basic ID ==
Domestic headstock logos will have "Made in USA" below or beside the logo. Guitars with the "Professional" and "Performer" logos are always imported. A USA J series serial number will always have 4 or 5 digits later, but any more means that it is an imported guitar. Archtop Soloist models have a JA + 4 digit number serial number.

For the 1980s custom era, the two standard classifications were the Student and Custom model. Student models featured rosewood fretboards and dot inlays. Early rosewood fretboards were Brazilian Rosewood. Custom models feature bound ebony fretboards, pearl sharkfin inlays, and binding on the headstock. There are many examples which blur the line. Often one can find examples with alternate fretboard material, or Student models with binding. Any option was available on request.

All Soloists are made using neck-thru the body construction.

== Later Models ==
There are many variations on the Soloist's basic design in production, but they can be split into four basic groups: SL1, SL2, SL3, SLSMG, and SL4X.

=== SL1 ===
The SL1 was the flagship USA-made Soloist model. It has an alder body intersected by a quartersawn maple neck-thru neck. The bound fingerboard is made from ebony and has 24 jumbo frets and triangular "shark tooth" inlays made from mother of pearl (all SL1 and SL2H models use real mother of pearl for their inlays). The SL1 uses a Floyd Rose original double-locking tremolo. It also has an HSS pickup array of Seymour Duncans, with the neck and middle pickups being single-slot overlapping Classic Stack humbuckers, while the bridge pickup is a TB-4 (JB) "Trembucker" humbucking pickup. The SL1T is the same guitar that uses a string-thru Tune-O-Matic bridge. The Soloist SL1 was discontinued as a production instrument in 2021, being available only through the Jackson Custom Shop.

=== SL2H ===
The SL2H (the 'SL2' is a different model which was produced in the years 1996–1997) shares the same characteristics with the SL1 except the pickup configuration. The guitar is made up of the same wood, 24 frets, neck-thru construction, same bridge, etc. Contrary to the SL1 the SL2H only has 2 Seymour Duncan pickups at neck and bridge positions. In addition, the SL2H uses a 3 way toggle selector switch rather than the 5-way selector blade found on the SL1 and SL3. The SL2H features an "Original" Floyd Rose locking vibrato, while the SL2HT uses a fixed bridge. The SL2H-MAH is made of mahogany (neck and body "wings"), with a transparent paint finish on both body and headstock. All SL2Hs are made in the US.

The SL2 is again a USA made Soloist with neck-thru construction (all Soloists have neck-thru constructions). The SL2 can be considered a more modest version of the SL2H, made up of maple thru-body neck and poplar wings, with an ebony board and "optional" sharktooth inlays. Most of them had a plain fingerboard without inlaid markers on it. The bridge is Jackson's Floyd Rose-licensed double locking tremolo JT-580 which is widely used on Japanese-made Jacksons. The Jackson logo is not "mother of pearl" on SL2s while it is on SL2Hs.

The USA-made Soloist SL2H and SL2 were discontinued as production instruments in 2021 to make way for the Japanese MJ Series Soloist SL2.

=== SL3 ===
The SL3 belongs to Jackson's Japanese-made Pro Series guitars. The body is made of alder and includes a flamed maple veneer on transparent finish models. The SL3 features the traditional Soloist setup of two single-coil slots for the neck and middle positions and a hot humbucker in the bridge position. Seymour Duncan Hot Rails are fitted in the single-coil slots and a Seymour Duncan JB humbucker occupies the bridge position. Additional features include an FRT-02000 or JT-580 double-locking tremolo, 24 frets, a compound radius Rosewood fretboard, sharktooth inlays and matching headstocks on transparent finish models. Jackson SL3s are manufactured in Japan. There is also a newer MG-version of it, SL3MG, which has the same features but with EMG 81/85 set. The Pro Series SL3R, made in China, features a mirror with matching reverse Jackson pointed 6-in-line headstock, white body binding and chrome hardware with 12"-16" compound radius bound ebony fingerboard with 24 jumbo frets and mirror piranha tooth inlays. In September 2022 Jackson released the American Series Soloist SL3. Made in Corona California, it comes in Gloss Black, Platinum Pearl, Riviera Blue or Satin Slime Green finishes with color matched Jackson pointy headstocks and black hardware.

=== SL4 ===
A very high quality Japanese manufactured model came to the market from the year 2000 until 2002 - the SL4 and it was from the high models of the Jackson guitars as they were made from alder or mahogany for the body-maple or mahogany for the necks but with two differences from the SL1 or the SL3 of Japan that were built late 1990s and early 2000s—the SL4 comes with 22 comfortable frets-humbucker pickups and Takeuchi JT 580 lp bridge units, as the model was coming in solid-trans-quilted maple finishes. Alongside the American lines of Jackson guitars there was other economic line—in prices—from 1987 until nowadays that called Pro lines for all Jackson models, and the top of these models in Soloist model were the 1990s models until 1996.

=== SLSMG ===
The SLSMG (Super Lightweight Soloist MG) is the entry level Soloist model and belongs to Jackson's MG series guitars. It features the neck-thru design that is obligatory for any Soloist. Along with the discontinued U.S. made SLS, the SLSMG is one of the few Soloist models not to feature the traditional pointed Jackson headstock with six inline tuners. Instead the headstock is fitted with a three tuners per side setup. Models released prior to July 2006 featured passive EMG HZ-H3 pickups while models released after this date are equipped with active EMG 81s and 85s in the bridge in the neck positions. The SLSMG's carved body is made from mahogany. The string-thru design makes the SLSMG one of the few Soloists without a Floyd Rose tremolo. All SLSMGs are made in Japan.

=== Chicago MG ===
Jackson briefly partnered with Washburn International with headquarters in Vernon Hills, Illinois and for a short time manufactured a version of the MG model on Elston Avenue in downtown Chicago. Additional models of the MG were imported for Washburn to Jackson's specifications. At that time, Jackson began to experiment with CNC equipment to customize the geometry of individual necks to the requirements of various artists. Other MG components were precision CNC machined by a local stair manufacturer resulting in high precision, repeatable MG assemblies.

=== SL4X ===
The SL4X is based on a now discontinued Charvel '80's guitar. The SL4X has the Soloist body shape, maple neck with rosewood fingerboard, 24 frets, and dot inlays. The SL4X is distinct from other Soloists by having three single coil Seymour Designed Hot Rails pickups and is the only Soloist to have a pickguard. The SL4X comes in the colors of Daphne Blue, Bubblegum Pink, and Neon Orange in the spirit of the '80s. Jackson introduced Specific Ocean as an additional color in the range. Additional models known as X Series SLX DX was released in 2017. They are Indonesian assembled and made for beginner, intermediate or budget minded players. They are the lowest priced Soloists and come with two humbucking Duncan designed Jackson passive pickups in a variety of colors like white, grey, black, orange, olive green or red. Hardware is chrome. Higher level models with one humbucker and two single coils have black hardware and distinct gold or silver crackle finishes that cover the a black body and neck. Models beyond that will have all black hardware and bodies and necks and come with two active battery powered Jackson pickups in a series of patterns on the face of the body such as Winter Camo, Jungle camo, Butterscotch, Polka Dot, Checkered past and Bullseye. Most have laurel fretboards. There are rare maple fretboarded white bodied Soloists with gold hardware as well.

== In popular culture ==
- Guitarist Jeff Beck had a pink Jackson Soloist he called "Tina", which he had used while recording Tina Turner's single "Private Dancer". Beck asked Turner to sign his guitar in lieu of payment; her signature was engraved with green nail polish rubbed into it.
