= Carvin Corporation =

American audio equipment manufacturer

- Company type: Private
- Industry: Amplifiers
- Genre: Music company
- Founded: 1946; 80 years ago
- Founder: Lowell Kiesel
- Headquarters: United States
- Area served: Global
- Products: Amplifiers, Audio equipment
- Website: www.carvinaudio.com

Carvin Corporation is a family-owned San Diego, California, manufacturer of guitar amplifiers and audio equipment. The company is known for its early work using plastics in the 1940s, making electric guitars from Resinox.

== History ==
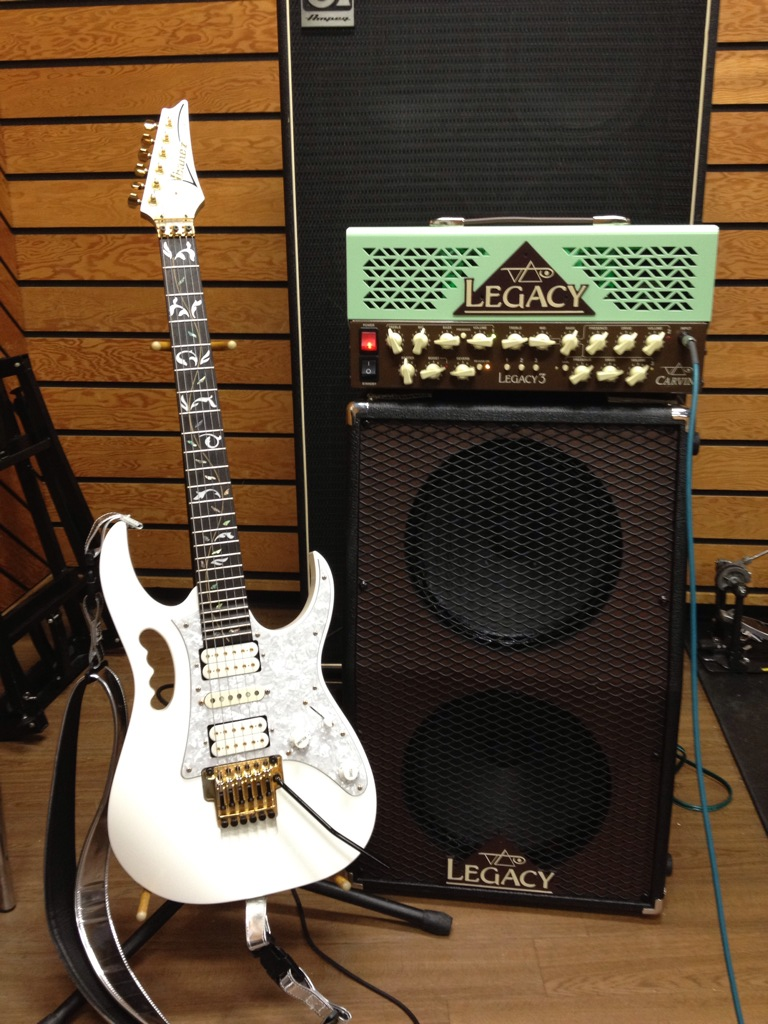
Carvin's Legacy 3 amplifier above a speaker cabinet with Ibanez JEM guitar, used by Steve Vai

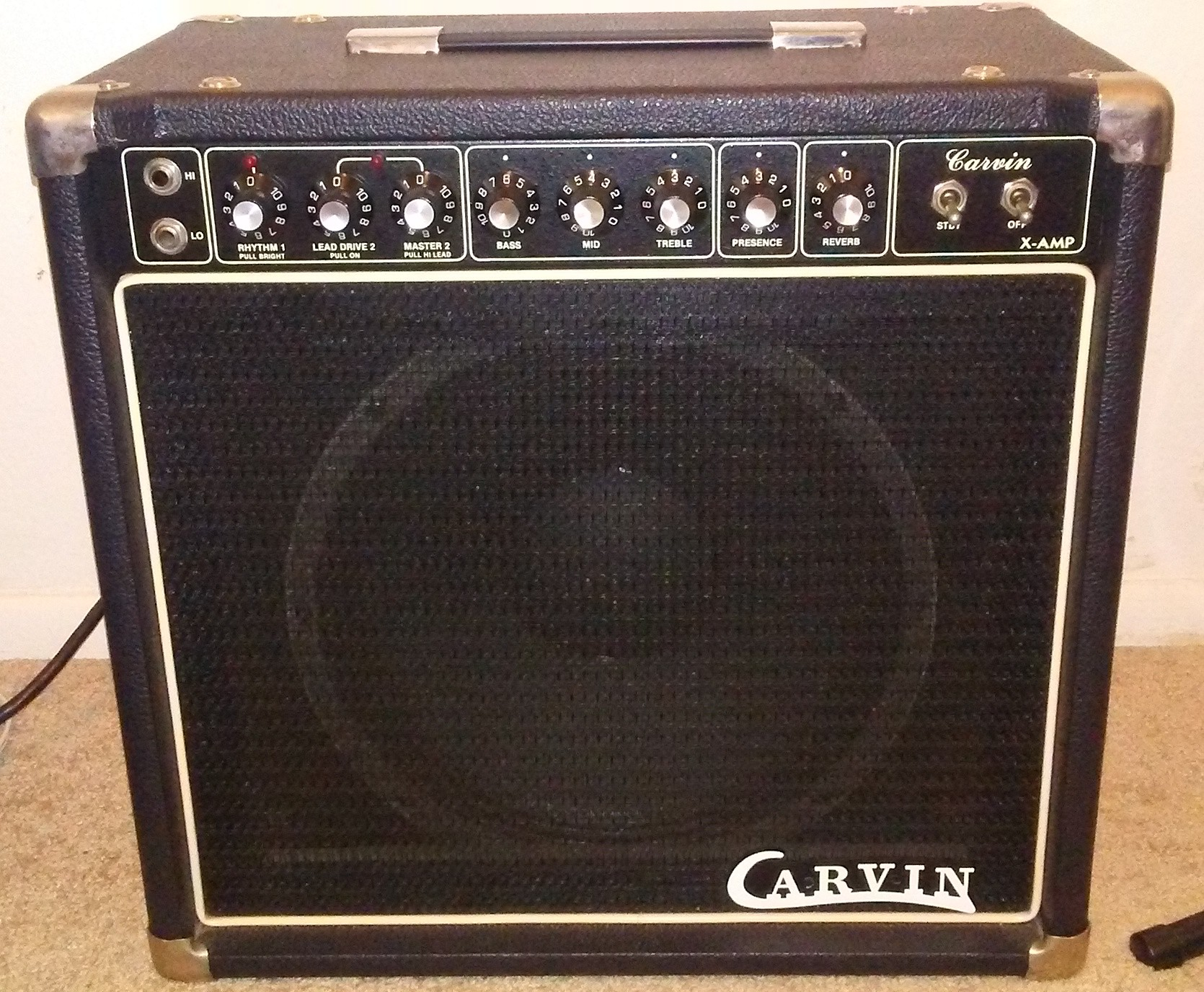
1984 Carvin X60 Amp

Founded by Lowel C Kiesel as the L.C. Kiesel Company, in 1946 in San Diego, California. The company's first self-manufactured items were guitar pickups, which were wound using an old sewing machine. Manufacturing then shifted to producing entire steel guitars.

By 1947, operations briefly moved to Kiesel's home town of Gothenburg, Nebraska and back to Southern California in 1949, where Kiesel named the company Carvin, a portmanteau derived from the first names of his two eldest sons, Carson and Gavin.

From 1950 to 1970, Carvin manufactured and assembled several types of guitars and amplifiers. They were an authorized manufacturer and reseller for Fender and Martin guitars, DeArmond pickups, and Sonola accordions. In the 1960s and early 1970s, they used Höfner necks on guitars they made.

Starting in the 1970s, Carvin developed a niche in the musical instrument world by selling directly to the public via mail order.

In the late 1970s, Carvin began the production of their own instrument parts and expanded their product lines to include professional audio gear, amps, recording equipment, lighting, and other stage and studio equipment. Later on, Carvin switched to manufacturing through-neck guitars, attracting metal players such as Jason Becker and Marty Friedman.

In the 1980s, they began to offer customized guitars and basses, based on available body shapes, woods, colors, electronics, and other features.

On December 28, 2009, it was announced that the founder of Carvin Guitars/Kiesel Guitar, Lowell C. Kiesel, had died.

In 2015, Carvin Corporation split off the guitar business to a new company, Kiesel Guitars, which continues to build electric and acoustic guitars, MIDI synth guitars, bass guitars and other instruments under the Carvin Guitars brand as well as new, Kiesel branded instruments. Carvin Corporation continued to operate the brands Carvin Amplifiers and Carvin Audio, which manufactured guitar and bass amplifiers as well as other professional audio gear. In October 2017, Carvin Audio announced that their California factory would be closing its doors after over 70 years.

On January 23, 2018, Carvin Amps and Audio announced the relaunch of their website. On June 14, 2018 Carvin announced the warehouse has been moved to a centralized USA location to offer customers faster shipping countrywide.
