= DiMarzio =

American manufacturer of guitar pickups

DiMarzio Inc.
- Company type: Private
- Founder: Larry DiMarzio
- Headquarters: Staten Island, New York, USA
- Products: Guitar pickups, guitar accessories
- Website: DiMarzio.com

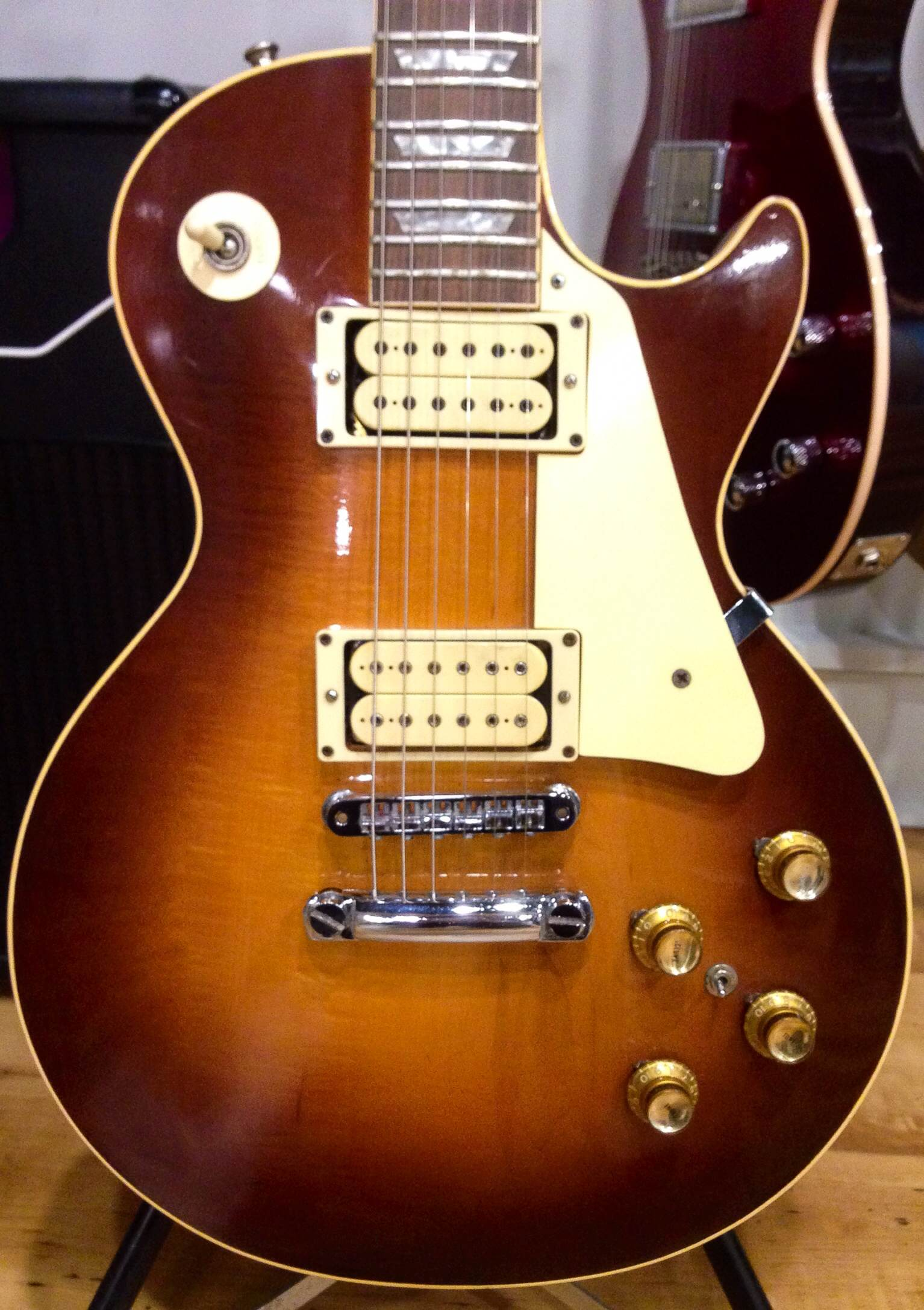
A Gibson Les Paul featuring DiMarzio humbuckers with characteristic double-cream bobbins.

DiMarzio, Inc. (formerly DiMarzio Musical Instrument Pickups, Inc.) is an American manufacturing company best known for popularizing direct-replacement guitar pickups. The company also produces other accessories, such as hardware, guitar straps, and instrument cables.

== History ==
Larry DiMarzio began his career repairing guitars for professional musicians in Staten Island, New York, in the 1960s, often being asked to retrofit standard humbuckers into Les Paul Deluxes and Stratocasters. By the early '70s, DiMarzio felt alternatives were needed to the stock pickups being produced by major guitar manufacturers like Fender, Gibson, and Gretsch, all of which had been bought by large corporations that prioritized cutting costs at the expense of product quality. His first offering was the "FS-1," a pickup designed to reduce the often shrill nature of stock Stratocaster bridge pickups, and which found an early fan in Pink Floyd's David Gilmour.

Knowing many rock guitarists sought a way to create more distorted tones at lower volumes and without relying on fuzz pedals, DiMarzio released the Super Distortion humbucker in 1972. It combined a brighter ceramic magnet with smaller-gauge wire that allowed for more turns per coil, thereby significantly increasing its output. The pickup was designed to fit standard Gibson humbucker mounts to avoid installation problems and used open-coil, cream-colored bobbins, a style that was distinctive to DiMarzio pickups, and which the company later trademarked. The Super Distortion was quickly embraced by guitarists upon its release, with early adopters like Ace Frehley of Kiss—who was introduced to DiMarzio by DiMarzio's college classmate Gene Simmons—and Joe Perry of Aerosmith. In the '80s, the pickup was used by many metal and hard rock players, including Dimebag Darrell, Kerry King, and Randy Rhoads, while Kurt Cobain and Kim Thayil adopted it in the '90s. Emerging guitar companies like B.C. Rich, Charvel, and Hamer used the Super Distortion in their early guitars.

As of 2016, DiMarzio offered nearly 200 pickup models, including traditional passive single coils and humbuckers, battery-powered active pickups, and models for seven- and eight-string guitars.

=== Trademark disputes ===
DiMarzio was granted the trademark for "PAF" in 1978, having been the first to use the term in commerce in 1976, in reference to their pickups recreating the original Gibson P.A.F. sound. According to the brand, this marketing use was legally distinct from Gibson's application of the original "patent applied for" stickers. DiMarzio was also granted the trademark for its double-cream bobbin humbucker design. In 2023, Gibson filed to cancel these trademarks, arguing Gibson was first to use the double-cream bobbin design and that DiMarzio never had a right to the term "PAF", as it had no related patents and that widespread use of "PAF" had rendered it generic and un-trademarkable. DiMarzio has opposed Gibson's claims, arguing Gibson is time-barred from challenging DiMarzio's trademarks and that Gibson had failed to make any allegations "related to the association in the public imagination between the [trade]marks at issue and DiMarzio."

== Patents ==
Lawrence P. DiMarzio holds following US patents:

- US patent 4133243, DiMarzio, Lawrence P., "Electric pickup", issued 1979-01-09
- US patent 4227434, DiMarzio, Lawrence P., "Adjustable soundhole mount for a musical pickup", issued 1980-10-14
- US patent 4320829, DiMarzio, Lawrence P.; Altilio, Daniel, "Merchandise display container", issued 1982-03-23 — a special container for merchandising pickups.
- US patent 4442749, DiMarzio, Lawrence P.; Blucher, Steven L., "Electrical pickup for a stringed instrument having ferromagnetic strings", issued 1984-04-17
