= Charvel =

American electric guitar brand

Charvel Guitars
- Type: Subsidiary
- Industry: Musical instruments
- Founded: 1974; 52 years ago in Azusa, California, U.S.
- Founder: Wayne Charvel
- Headquarters: Scottsdale, Arizona, U.S.
- Area served: Worldwide
- Products: Electric guitars
- Parent: Fender Musical Instruments Corporation
- Website: charvel.com

Charvel (/ʃɑːrˈvɛl/ shar-VEL) is a brand of electric guitars founded in the 1970s by Wayne Charvel in Azusa, California and originally headquartered in Glendora, California. Since 2002, Charvel has been under the ownership of Fender Musical Instruments Corporation.

== History ==
Charvel guitars became popular in the 1980s due to their association with famous rock and heavy metal guitarists such as Eddie Van Halen (Van Halen), Chris Holmes (W.A.S.P.), Gary Moore, Warren DeMartini (Ratt), Jake E. Lee (Ozzy Osbourne), Eddie Ojeda (Twisted Sister), George Lynch (Dokken), Allan Holdsworth, Shawn Lane, Richie Sambora (Bon Jovi), and others. Modern Charvel players include Guthrie Govan (The Aristocrats), Satchel (Steel Panther), Mike Orlando (Adrenaline Mob), Joe Duplantier (Gojira), Andy Glass (Solstice), and Angel Vivaldi.

=== 1970s ===
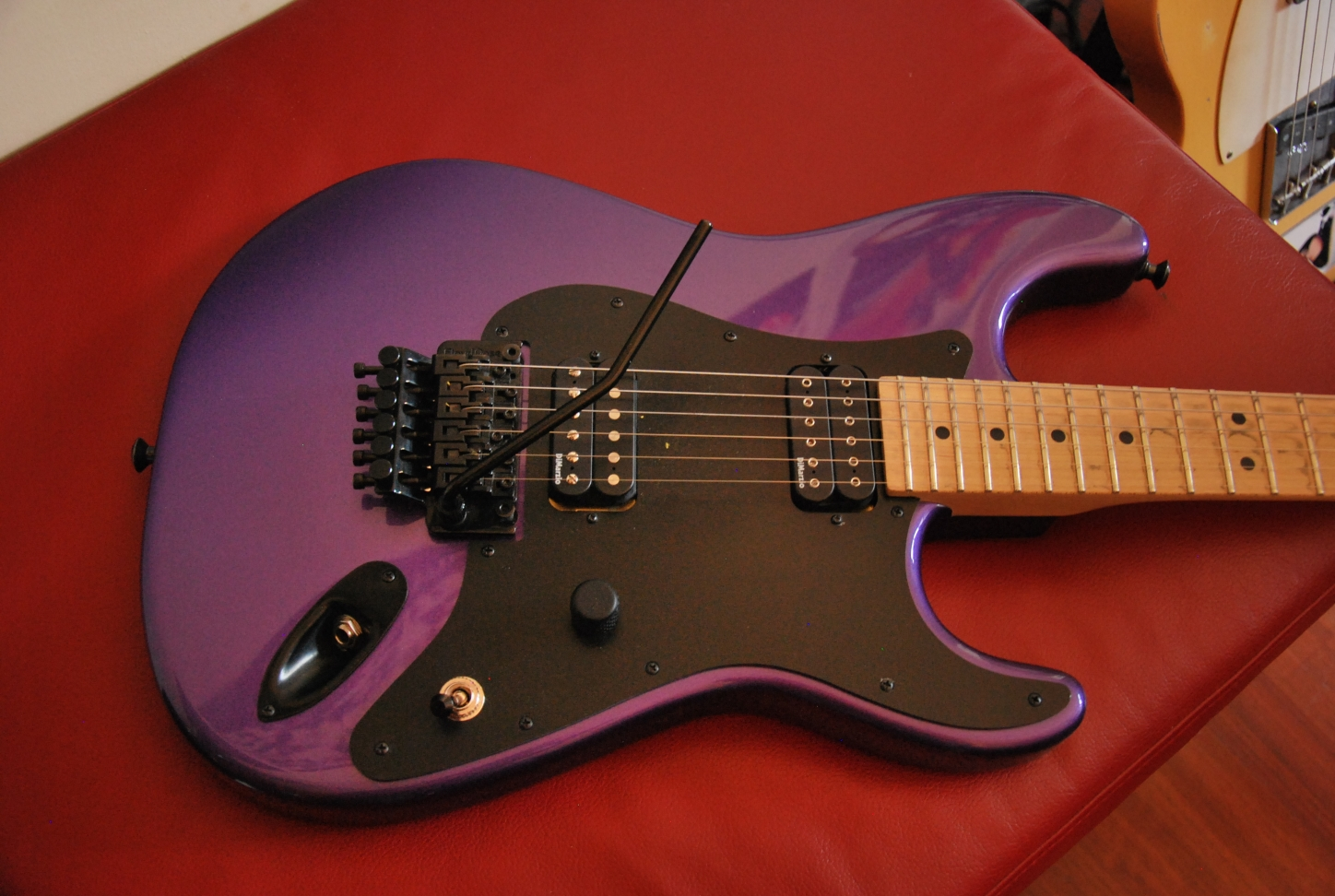
So-Cal Style 1 HH Candy Plum.

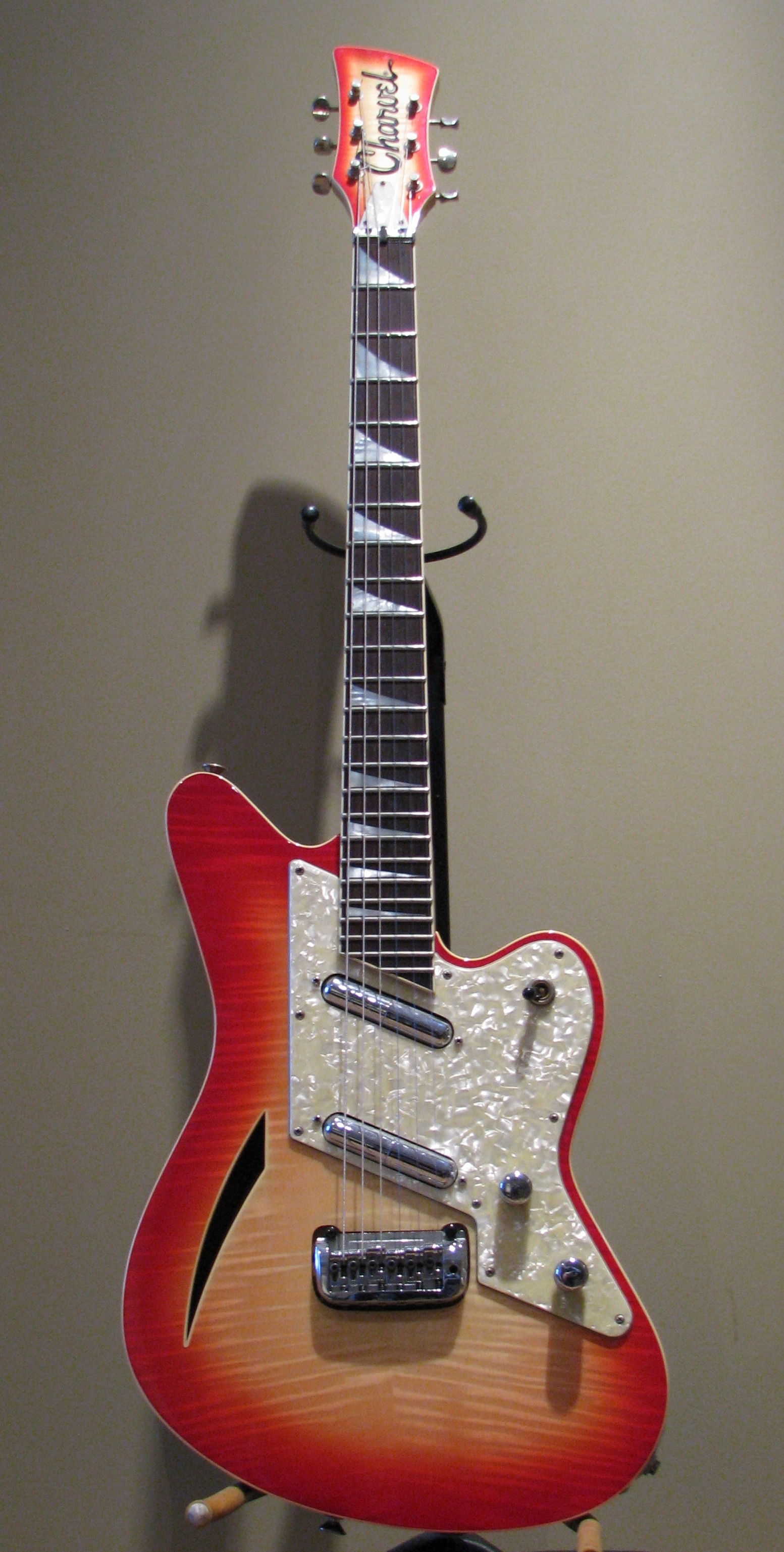
Charvel Surfcaster.

After working at Fender for three years in the early 1970s, Wayne Charvel started "Charvel's Guitar Repair" in 1974 to refinish and repair out-of-warranty Fender instruments. The shop earned a solid reputation among performing artists for its repair work, custom finishes, and upgraded parts manufacturing. When Asian companies began copying Charvel's parts and selling them at a discount, Charvel decided to begin assembling complete guitars on the advice of Grover Jackson. Charvel guitars were assembled from wood parts made by Boogie Bodies and Schecter, with various Charvel and after-market hardware. After filing for bankruptcy, Wayne Charvel sold what was left of the company to Grover Jackson in 1978, and ceased all associations with the name.

After purchasing the company name, Grover Jackson moved the business to a new location and tooled it to produce guitar bodies which he sold to Mighty Mite and DiMarzio, using the proceeds to fund an expansion into making necks. During this time B.C. Rich, SD Curlee, and Music Man approached Charvel to manufacture various wood parts. The income from these sales provided the Charvel shop with additional tooling and experience that gave Jackson the footing required to grow the Charvel brand.

Beginning in the late 1970s, Charvel popularized custom revamps of the Fender Stratocaster design — often consisting of a Strat-shaped body with a single humbucking pickup and Fender style tremolo bridge systems. This modernized Stratocaster configuration (commonly referred to as the superstrat) was particularly well suited to the heavy metal style of music that was very popular at the time. Charvel guitars became renowned for its use of creative graphics, unfinished maple necks, and various innovative appointments.

=== 1980s ===
In 1980, Grover Jackson met Randy Rhoads, who had recently joined Ozzy Osbourne's new band as lead guitarist. They worked together to develop a guitar to complement the polka-dotted Flying V built for Rhoads by Karl Sandoval. The prototype was not angular enough for Rhoads, but the second design produced a shape that Randy referred to as the Concorde. Jackson worried that the radically styled neck-through guitar was too different from Charvel's familiar 'Superstrat' theme, so he labeled the instrument with his own name on the headstock in case the design proved unpopular. Contrary to Jackson's concerns, the visual impact of this guitar spawned the "Rhoads Model" that soon became iconic in the industry and later inspired Jackson to found Jackson Guitars.

Charvel (and Jackson) guitars remained in production at the Gladstone Street shop in Glendora, California until 1986. In 1986, as part of a licensing agreement with IMC (International Music Corporation), the manufacturing facilities moved to Ontario, California, and production of USA-built Charvel guitars ceased.

The success of Charvel in the 1980s led Jackson to mass-produce popular configurations in Asia. Each California-produced Charvel guitar was essentially a hand-built custom instrument. However, Japanese assembly line versions that appeared in 1986 were categorized into model numbers.

In 1989, Jackson sold Charvel/Jackson to the Japanese manufacturer IMC (International Music Corporation), who made Charvel guitars exclusively in Japan from 1986 to 1991.

The Japanese made Charvels that appeared in 1986 are easily distinguished from San Dimas instruments by several distinct differences:

- Neck plates circa 1982-1986 stamped "San Dimas, CA" (then briefly "Ontario, CA") changed to a plate that read "Ft. Worth, TX", the location of IMC's U.S. offices. This confused many consumers as, without exception, all guitars with the "Ft. Worth" neck plate were made in Japan.
- The gold label, "Charvel - Made in USA" affixed to the headstock of the San Dimas era (U.S. made) instruments changed to a white logo that read "Charvel - By Jackson/Charvel."
- Instead of the unfinished maple bolt-on neck that was a hallmark of the U.S. instruments, the imported instruments had a Japanese neck with a clear satin finish.

=== 2002—rebirth under Fender ===
When Fender Musical Instruments Corporation acquired Charvel's parent company, Jackson, in 2002, the Charvel brand entered a renaissance with several USA-made "San Dimas" models which were named to recapture the original association of the Charvel name with high-quality, American-made professional guitars.

Fender now offers several series of guitars in the Charvel brand including both moderately-priced and "boutique-priced" instruments, all of which are produced in Fender's factories. The brand also operates a full-service custom shop within the Fender Custom Shop facility in Corona. One of Charvel's recent and notable Custom Shop models was the Eddie Van Halen signature "Striped Series" model (marketed as the Charvel EVH Art Series), a short run of guitars paint-stenciled by the guitarist.

== Guitar models ==
=== Current ===
Charvel currently offers a range of guitars using Stratocaster-style (Dinky, San Dimas Style 1, and So-Cal Style 1) and Telecaster-style (San Dimas Style 2 and So-Cal Style 2) bodies, all of which are produced in Fender's Corona, USA, and Ensenada, Mexico, manufacturing facilities:

- Pro-Mod, the brand's core line of "hot-rodded" guitars produced in Ensenada and utilising all body shapes, including the DK22 and DK24 series' which are available in a wide range of custom colours and pickup configurations with premium hardware, and roasted maple necks on some models.
- The MJ Series of Japanese built premium models: 1999 Style 1 San Dima, 2022 ‘Guthrie Govan’ San Dimas SD24 in Sunburst, 2021 MJ Dinky DK24 HSH 2PT Natural Walnut and Streaky Ebony fretboard.
- USA Select, Charvel's flagship series produced by the Custom Shop in Corona utilising the So-Cal and San Dimas body shapes.
- Artist Signature guitars produced in both factories for Guthrie Govan, Satchel (musician), Jake E Lee, Warren DeMartini, Angel Vivaldi, and Joe Duplantier.
- Custom Shop instruments built to customer specification which can be ordered through a network of Custom Shop dealers in the US, UK, and Germany.

The brand also offers Limited Edition runs of guitars, including "Super Stock" models which are sometimes offered in a "relic" finish.

=== Past ===
==== Desolation series ====
A Chinese-built line introduced in 2011, the budget Desolation series guitars had an oiled neck and 24 frets. A number of versions were available:

- Star—DST-1 FR (Floyd Rose bridge, EMG 81/85 pickups), DST-1 ST (EMG 81/85 pickups), DST-3 FR 1H (Floyd Rose, one BooHeung BO-102JB pickup)
- Soloist—DX-1 FR (Floyd Rose bridge, EMG 81/85 pickups), DX-1 ST (EMG 81/85 pickups)
- Skatecaster—SK-1 FR (Floyd Rose bridge, EMG 81/85 pickups), SK-1 ST (EMG 81/85 pickups), SK-3 ST (Passive Desolation Humbucking pickups)
- Singlecut—DS-1 FR (Floyd Rose bridge, Seymour Duncan Blackout pickups), DS-1 ST (Seymour Duncan Blackout pickups), DS-2 ST (Active Desolation Humbucking pickups), DS-3 ST (Passive Desolation Humbucking pickups)
- Doublecut—DC-1 FR (Floyd Rose bridge, EMG 81/85 pickups), DC-1 ST (EMG 81/85 pickups), DC-2 ST (Active Desolation Humbucking pickups)

==== Other models ====
- Surfcaster. Produced between 1992 and 2005. Originally a semi-hollow guitar with lipstick pickups, later versions had a solid body or added a humbucking pickup in the bridge position.
- Route 66. In 1984, Charvel made a limited run of around 100 guitars called Route 66, which consisted of a Fender Telecaster style body in black, red, or sunburst, and fitted with chrome or black hardware and dice as volume knobs. The flashy styling and high price ($1200) proved unpopular, and the basic style was later revived for Korean production under the Jackson brand.

In 1989, the Charvel line was expanded into a number of different series, including Classic, Fusion and Contemporary:

- Classic series, including the 275, 375, 375 deluxe and 475 models.
- Fusion series, with shorter scale necks, and included Deluxe and Custom models.
- Contemporary range, including the Predator and Spectrum models:
  - The Spectrum guitar was inspired by a Jackson guitar custom built for Jeff Beck, and was based on a Stratocaster style body but with a reversed pointed headstock, an early 1950s Fender P-Bass-inspired pickguard, wild colors, and an active tone circuit that produced a "wah" effect. The three single-coil pickups were in fact stacked humbucking coils.
  - The Predator guitar featured reversed pointed headstock and slanted single coil-humbucker pickup layout.

Most of the guitars at the time were equipped with Schaller hardware, including a licensed Floyd Rose locking tremolo.

The Korean-made Charvette brand also came into being to service the entry-level. In the 1990s, the Charvel CX series was imported as a lower-priced instrument.

== Fake Charvels ==
The collectible status and escalating market prices of early USA-made Charvels resulted in counterfeit "San Dimas Charvels" being misrepresented as genuine. These fakes were often created by swapping necks and/or "San Dimas"-stamped neck plates onto Asian-made Charvels or other inexpensive guitars, adding a reproduction San Dimas era "Charvel - Made in USA" headstock decal.

== Wayne Charvel from 1941 - 2026 ==
Wayne Charvel resurfaced in guitar manufacturing several times since selling the brand in 1978, with varying degrees of success. He created a namesake model offered through Gibson: the Gibson W.R.C. Signature Model. Only several hundred were produced, and they were short-lived—mainly because of a lawsuit filed by Jackson. Gibson made the W.R.C. models from 1987 to 1988 in three standard colors: red, black, and white. Of those produced, 200 were 'show case' models that featured Wayne Charvel's signature on the bell and were accompanied by a letter from him. The WRC model came with a tan faux leather case with hot pink interior and combination locks. Earlier models had a Kahler Spyder tremolo, while later models featured a Floyd Rose Original. All featured a maple bolt-on neck with ebony fingerboard.

Up until his death, Charvel and his son Michael owned and operated Charvel Music, a full line music store in Paradise, California, and manufactured guitars as a joint venture under the name Wayne Guitars. Their houses and shop burned down in the 2018 Camp Fire.

Wayne Charvel died on July 12th 2026.
