= List of Japanese OEM guitar manufacturers =

The following list includes companies based in Japan which produce (or have produced in the past) guitars and other related string instruments which are sold by other brands under original equipment manufacturer (OEM) arrangements.

== List of Japanese OEM guitar manufacturers ==
Manufacturer	Est.	Location	Description/ Associated Brands
Atlansia	1982	Nagano	Atlansia was formed in 1982 by Nobuaki Hayashi, who also uses the pseudonym H. Nobel and who previously worked for Matsumoku. While they primarily sell guitars under their own label, they have also made parts (e.g. necks) for other brands such as Fender Japan.
Chushin Gakki	1948	Nagano	Chushin Gakki was established by K. Miyazawa in 1948. They have made electric guitars since 1961. They produced guitars sold by Charvel, Jackson, Fresher and Robin from the early 1980s, as well as Ibanez's Axstar line in the late 1980s. They also sold original designs under names such as Bambu, Cobran, and Hisonus. The El Maya (EM series) was a collaboration with Maya Musical Instrument Co and American manufacturer engineer (Alembic?), starting in 1977 through the early 1980s.
Dyna Gakki	1973	Nagano	Dyna Gakki was founded in 1973 and have built guitars for several well-known brands. They produced Ibanez's Blazer line in the 1980s and have also made guitars for Fender, Greco (for Kanda Shokai), Gretsch, and Fernandes. Dyna also made the Yamaki/Daion/Founder/Joodee solid body guitars for Daion in the 1970s and early 1980s.
Fuji Gengakki	1960	Matsumoto	Fuji Gengakki was established in May 1960 by Yutaka Mimura and Yuichiro Yokouchi. The company initially produced violins and classical guitars with electric guitar production following a couple of years later. By the 1970s Fuji Gengakki was producing instruments for a number of brands including Hoshino Gakki (Ibanez), CSL (Antoria), Kanda Shokai (Greco guitars) and Yamaha. Since then they've also produced guitars for Fender and Gibson as well as selling guitars under their own FGN brand.
Guyatone	1933	Tokyo	Guyatone was founded by Mitsuo Matsuki in 1933. The company produced its first solid body electric guitars, copies of Les Paul model, in 1955. Within a few years they were exporting these guitars under their own brand as well as others such as Star and Antoria. These guitars proved popular, particularly in the U.K. Guyatone also produced guitars sold by other brands including Ibanez and Kent.
Iida Gakki	1958	Nagoya	Iida Gakki have made solid body, semi-acoustic and acoustic guitars for well-known brands such as Yamaha and Caparison. Iida built Ibanez's Artfield guitars in the late 1980s as well as some models in that company's Artist series. They also built banjoes and mandolins for the Sigma by Martin brand. From the late 1980s, they have shifted most (if not all) of their production to South Korea in their Peerless facility.
Kasuga	1935	Nagoya	Kasuga was founded in 1935 by Kazuyuki Kasuga. They produced a variety of stringed instruments: guitars, banjoes, mandolins, ukuleles and even violins. Many of these were sold under the Kasuga brand. Kasuga was one of the first Japanese companies to begin producing and selling copies of guitars from the big US brands, primarily those from Gibson but also Fender, starting in 1972. They sold these replica guitars under their own RK Herby and Heerby brands as well as producing them for other companies — Guild sold Kasuga-made guitars under their Madeira nameplate. Kasuga was later involved in a joint venture with Roland to produce guitar synths. By the 1980s Kasuga stopped selling guitar under their own brands and instead focused on OEM production for other companies. They made acoustic guitars for Yamaha as well as guitars sold by Burny, Washburn and under ESP Guitars' Navigator brand. Business conditions became difficult in the late 1980s due to the strength of the Japanese yen in global currency markets, which forced most production overseas to Taiwan and elsewhere. Kasugi continued producing mainly violins and bouzoukis for a while, but they ceased operations in 1996.
Matsuoka Guitar	1959	Nagoya	Matsuoka was founded in 1959 by self taught luthier Ryoji Matsuoka. They produced guitars for Ibanez and Aria in the 1960s and 1970s in addition to selling guitars under their own brand.
Matsumoku	1951	Matsumoto	Matsumoku Industrial was founded in 1951 as a woodworking shop. After World War II the American Singer Corporation contracted with Matsumoku to build sewing machine cabinets. The company soon ventured into musical instrument production, producing primarily classical guitars and violins. By the 1960s they were producing guitars and parts for other brands including Vox, Greco, Ibanez, Yamaha, Aria, Norlin/Gibson, Univox, Westbury and Washburn as well as selling under their own Westone brand. The company ceased operations in 1987 due to monetary conditions that made Japanese production less attractive as well as the loss of the Singer work due to a corporate takeover.
Sugi Guitars	2002	Matsumoto	Sugi Musical Instruments Ltd. (Japanese: スギ・ミュージカル・インストゥルメンツ 有限会社) also known as Sugi Guitars was founded in 2002 by Makoto "Nick" Sugimoto. Prior to founding Sugi, Sugimoto had worked for many years as head of R&D at FujiGen Gakki. In addition to selling guitars and basses under their own brand, Sugi also builds guitars sold by Ibanez as part of their high-end "J. Custom" range as well as some of their artist signature models.
Terada	1912	Nagoya	Terada began producing stringed instruments in Nagoya in 1912. Over the years they've produced guitars sold by Epiphone, Burny, C. F. Martin, Gallagher, Gretsch, Ibanez, Morris, Orville by Gibson, Steinberger, and others. They specialize primarily in building semi-acoustic and acoustic guitars. They also sold guitars under the T. Haruo brand in the United States and the Terada brand elsewhere. At their production peak, which ran from the late 1970s through the early 1990s, Terada produced up to 10,000 guitars a month in three factories: Higashiku, Kanie and Shirakawa. Their current output is about 1/8 of what it was at their peak and only the Kanie factory remains, producing exclusively semi-acoustic guitars.
Tōkai Gakki	1947	Hamamatsu	Tokai is a family owned business which began as a maker of harmonicas and pianos. They started producing guitars in the mid 1960s and have since built instruments for many well-known brands including C. F. Martin, Fender and Fernandes. They also sell guitars under their own brands.
Yamaki	1967	Suwa, Nagano	Founded by Kazuyuki Teradaira as a maker of classical guitars. Yamaki guitars were sold by Daion, which was a firm run by Mr. Teradaira's brother. In addition to selling guitars bearing the Yamaki and Daion brands, they also produced some instruments that were sold by Washburn Guitars.
