= Squier =

String and guitar manufacturer

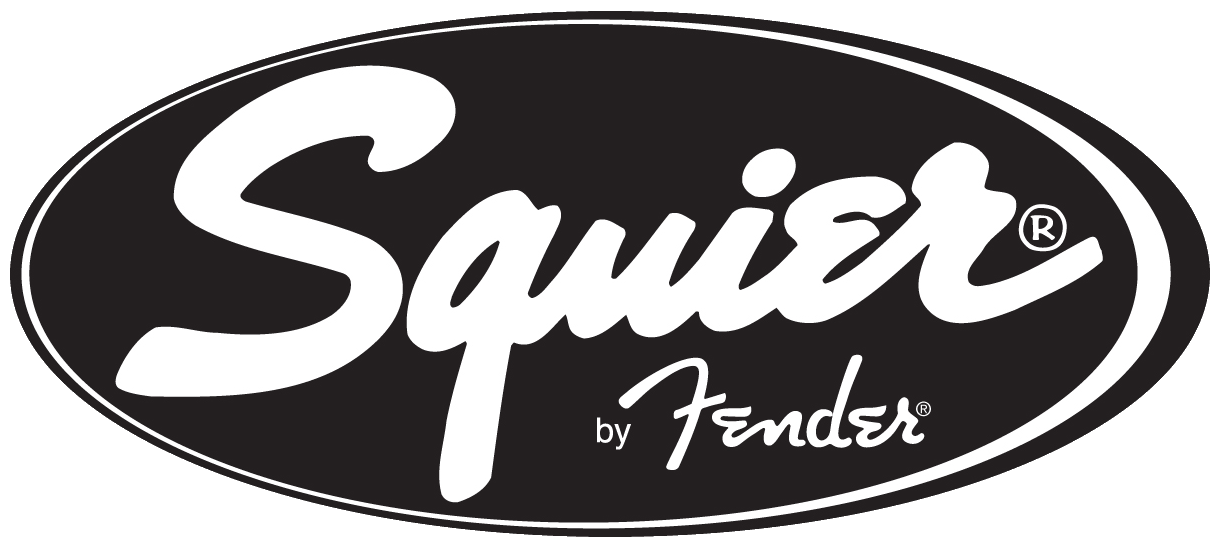
- Formerly: V. C. Squier Company (1890–1975)
- Type: Private (1890–1975); Subsidiary (1965–75); Brand (1982–present)
- Industry: Musical instruments
- Founded: 1890 in Battle Creek, Michigan, United States
- Founder: Victor Carroll Squier
- Fate: Acquired by Fender in 1965; company defunct in 1975, becoming a brand in 1982
- Headquarters: Los Angeles, United States
- Products: Current: Electric guitars, electric bass and guitar amplifiers; Former: Violin strings, banjo strings and guitar strings
- Owner: Fender (1975–present)
- Parent: Fender (1965–75)
- Website: fender.com/squier-series

Squier is an American brand of electric guitars owned by Fender. The former manufacturing company, established as "V. C. Squier Company" was founded in 1890 by Victor Carroll Squier in Battle Creek, Michigan, producing strings for violins, banjos, and guitars. In 1965, the company was acquired by Fender.

By 1975, Squier became defunct as a manufacturer and a brand name for strings, as Fender opted to market its strings under the Fender brand name. In 1982, the Squier name was reactivated by Fender as its brand for lower-priced versions of Fender guitars. Squier guitars have been manufactured in the United States, Japan, South Korea, Indonesia, China, and Mexico.

== History ==
=== V.C. Squier Company (1890–1981) ===
Jerome Bonaparte Squier, a young English immigrant who arrived in Battle Creek, Michigan, in the latter part of the 19th century, was a farmer and shoemaker who had learned the fine European art of violin making. He moved to Boston in 1881, where he built and repaired violins with his son, Victor Carroll Squier. To this day, their violins are noted for their exceptional varnishes, and they command high prices as fine examples of early U.S. instrument craftsmanship. Indeed, Squier was ranked among the best-known U.S.-trained violin makers and is often referred to as "the American Stradivarius."

Victor Carroll Squier returned to Battle Creek, where he opened his own shop in 1890. As his business grew, Squier moved the company to 429 Lake Ave. and eventually to 427 Capitol Ave, S.W.—the famous "fiddle factory" of Battle Creek. With a limited market for violins in Battle Creek, however, Squier astutely sought relationships with national music schools and famous violinists.

Up to 1900, the best violin strings were made in Europe. Victor Squier started making his own hand-wound violin strings, and the business grew so quickly that he and his employees improvised a dramatic production increase by converting a treadle sewing machine into a string winder capable of producing 1,000 uniformly high-quality strings per day. Squier violin strings, banjo strings and guitar strings became well known nationwide and were especially popular among students because of their reasonable price.

In the 1930s, Squier began making strings for the era's new electric instruments; the company also sold pianos, radios and phonograph records until divesting itself of all products other than strings in 1961. Fender Electric Instruments entered the picture in the 1950s, when the V. C. Squier Company began supplying Southern California inventor and businessman Leo Fender with strings for his unusual new electric guitars. The V. C. Squier Company became an official original equipment manufacturer for Fender in 1963. Fender acquired the V. C. Squier Company in early 1965, shortly before Fender itself was acquired by CBS in May of the same year. By the mid-1970s, the Squier name was retired as the strings had taken the Fender name. The company itself was shuttered along with its Battle Creek factory in 1981.

=== Squier Guitars brand (1982–present) ===
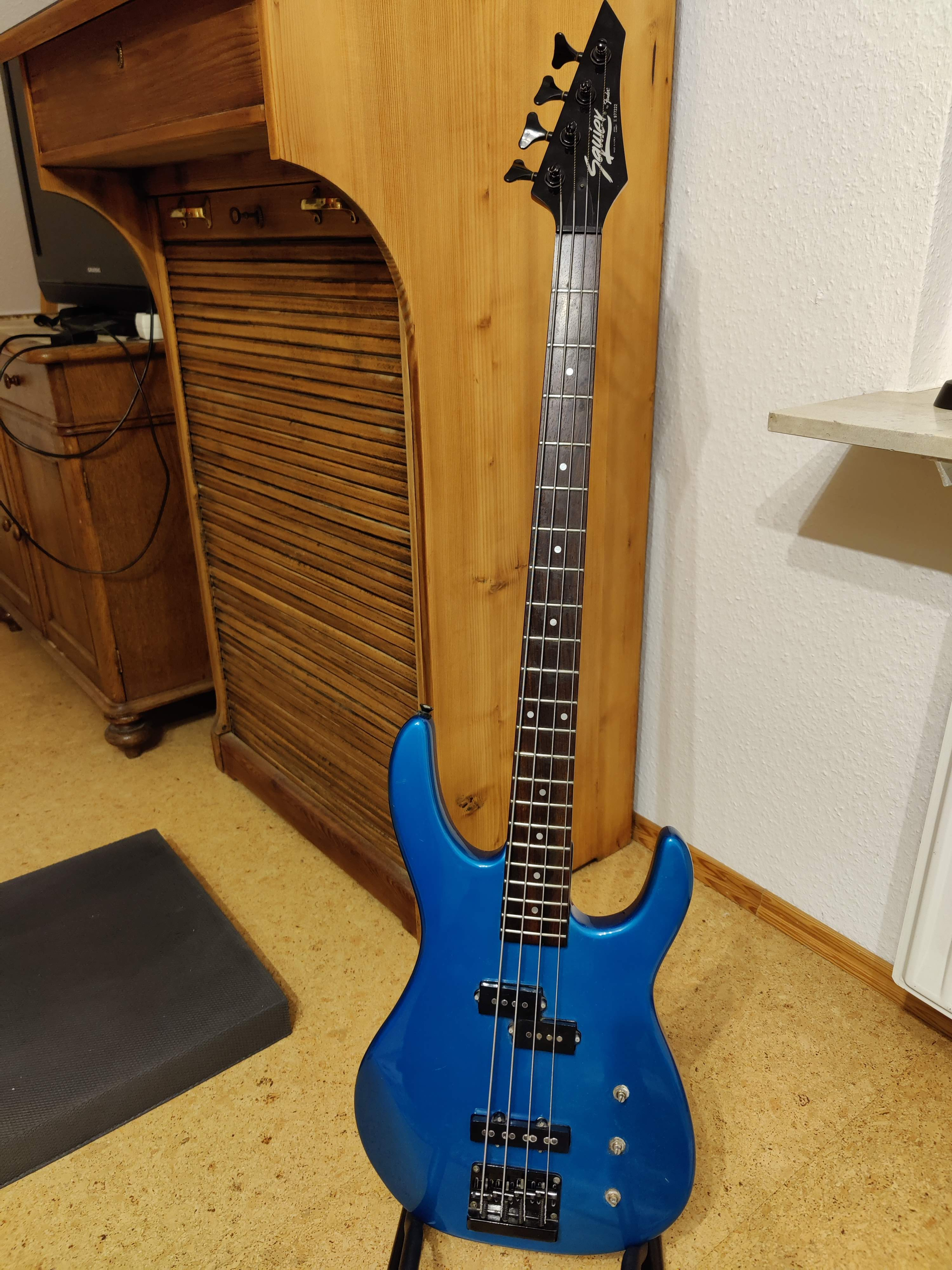
Squier Bass Made in Korea 1989

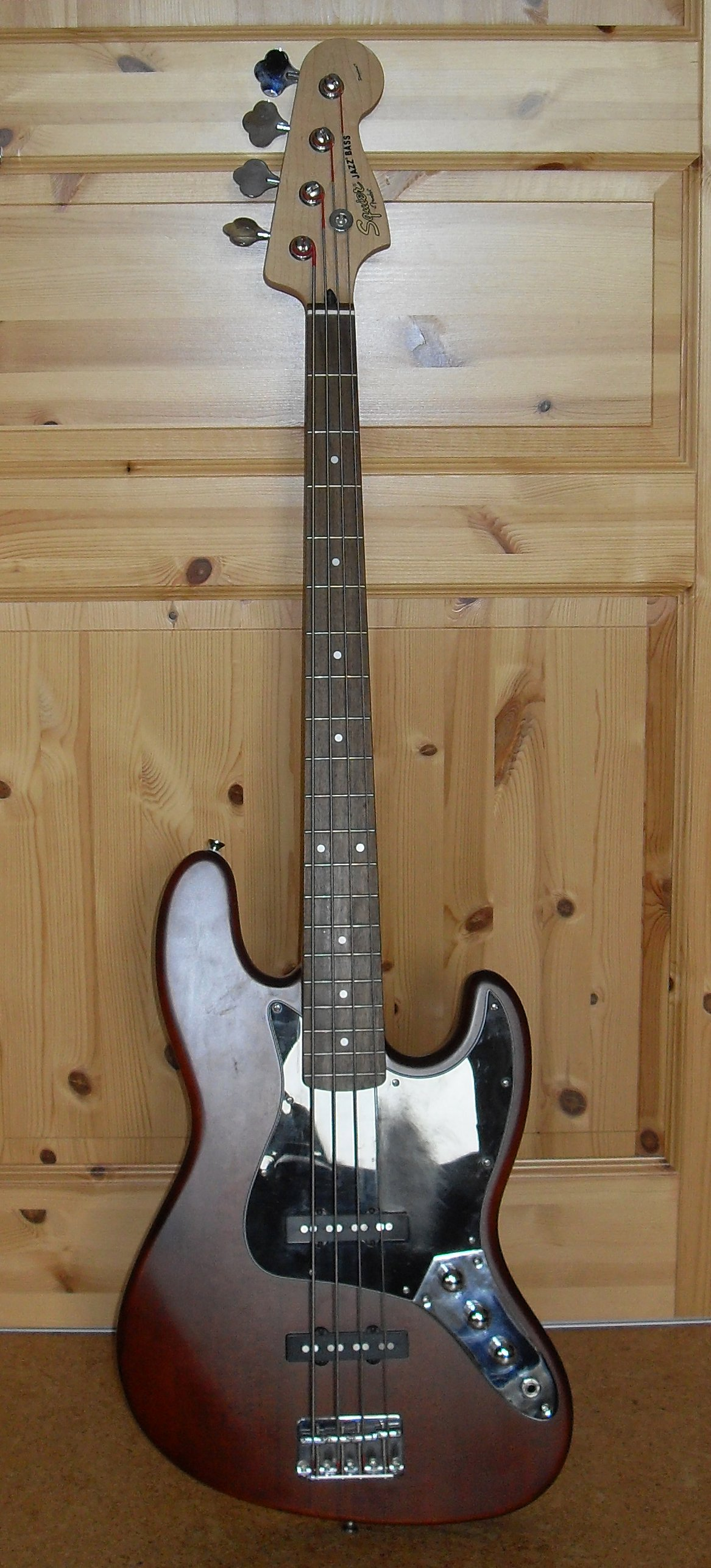
Squier Jazz Bass

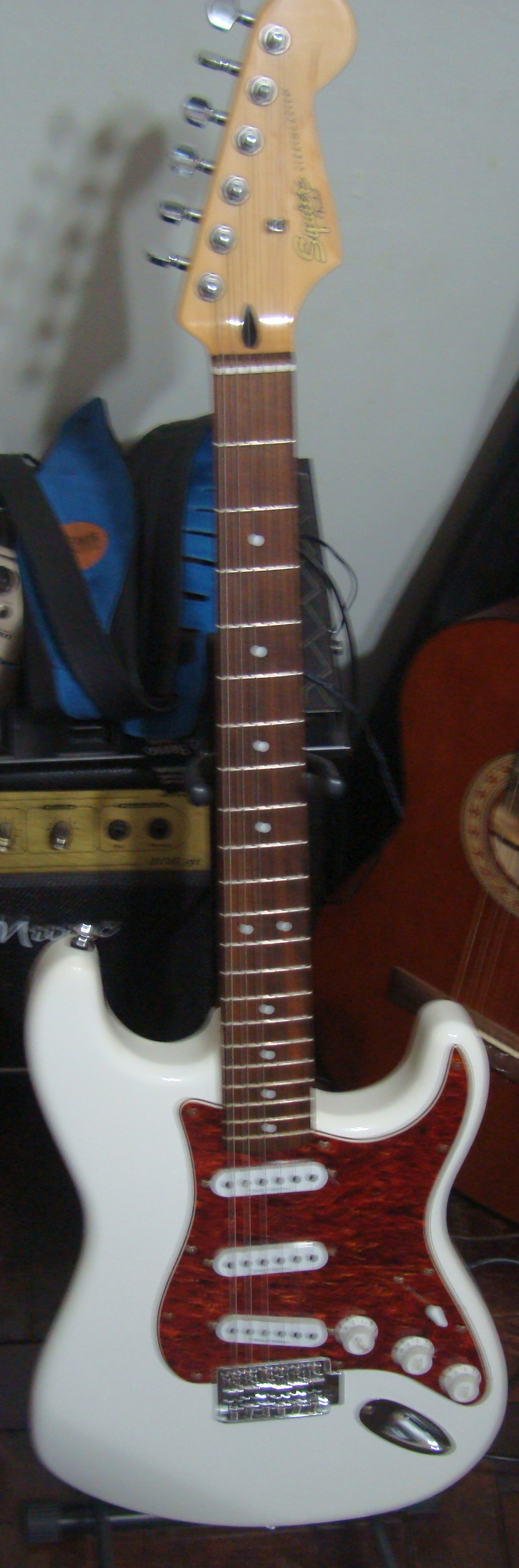
Vintage Squier Stratocaster

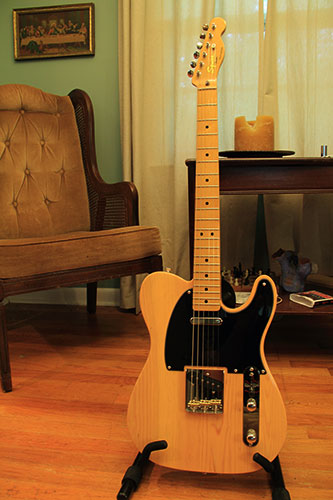
Squier Telecaster'50s

Before the Squier line of guitars was introduced in 1982, Fender was making lower-priced guitars such as the Fender Lead series at its Fullerton, California plant. Until the introduction of the Fender Squier series, Fender had never produced lower-priced guitars based on its main Stratocaster and Telecaster models and had always used different model designs for its lower-priced guitars.

In the late 1970s and early 1980s Fender was facing competition from lower-priced Japanese copies. The higher-priced Fender guitars were made in the United States and could not compete with the lower prices of Japanese-made Fender copies. In the early 1980s, Japanese labor and production costs were much lower than in America, and to compete with the Japanese-made guitars, Fender moved the lower-priced Fender guitar production from America to Japan.

Fender was also losing sales in Japan to Japanese guitar brands such as Tōkai, Greco and Fernandes, and the establishment of Fender Japan would benefit Fender sales in Japan, as well as overseas. Fender began negotiations with several Japanese musical instrument distributors and reached an agreement with Yamano Gakki and Kanda Shokai to establish Fender Japan. Yamano Gakki was known for once being part of Epiphone Japan. Kanda Shokai owned the Greco brand name and one of the conditions of the Fender Japan agreement was that Kanda Shokai cease production of its own Greco Fender copies. This arrangement benefited Fender because it removed the Greco Fender copies from the Japanese market, which were selling in Japan at much lower prices than the American-made Fenders, and it also benefited Kanda Shokai because Kanda Shokai could then distribute Japanese made Fender branded guitars in Japan. Further negotiations between Fender and Japanese guitar factories took place. Tokai was seriously considered to start building the first Japanese-made Fenders, but after a breakdown in negotiations, FujiGen Gakki was chosen instead.

The initial Squier models were launched on July/August 1982. Over time, the Squier series slowly evolved to include original model designs and production has moved from Japan to various other Asian countries such as Korea, China and Indonesia. These guitars were massively successful and some of the Squier guitars were turned into Fender guitars.

== See also ==
- Fender Bullet
- Starcaster by Fender
