= List of acoustic guitar brands =

This is a list of Wikipedia articles about brand names under which acoustic guitars have been sold.

== A-F ==
- Alvarez
- Aria
- Breedlove
- Cort
- D'Angelico
- Dean
- Dobro
- Eko
- Epiphone
- Fender
- First Act
- Framus
- Furch

== G-L ==
- Gibson
- Godin
- Greco
- Gretsch
- Guild
- Hagström
- Höfner
- Ibanez
- Kay
- Lâg
- Larrivée
- Luna Guitars

== M-R ==
- Martin
- Maton
- Michael Kelly
- Norman
- Oscar Schmidt by Washburn
- Ovation
- PRS
- Recording King
- Rickenbacker

== S-Z ==
- Samick
- Schecter
- Seagull
- Sigma Guitars
- Silvertone
- Stagg
- Tagima
- Takamine
- Taylor
- Tokai
- Walden
- Washburn
- Yamaha
