= Robin Guitars =

American guitar manufacturing company

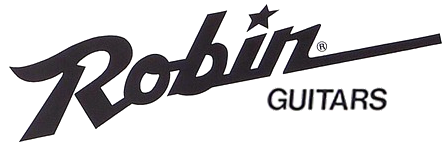
- Type: Private
- Industry: Musical instruments
- Founded: 1982; 44 years ago
- Founder: Dave Wintz
- Headquarters: Houston, Texas, American
- Products: Electric guitars
- Website: robinguitars.com

Robin Guitars is a boutique manufacturing company that produces electric guitars. The company is located in Houston, Texas.

== History ==
The company was formed in 1982 by John "Bart" Wittrock and Dave Wintz who owned the Rockin' Robin Guitar Shop at the time. Robin guitars were made in Japan by Tokai and Chushin until 1986, when their production moved to the United States. Notable endorsers include Stevie Ray Vaughan and his brother Jimmie, who were frequently seen onstage with the "RDN" 6-string standard neck/6 string octave neck double-neck guitar in the 1980s. Eric Johnson has played them, and Steve Blaze of Lillian Axe also played Robin guitars during the early part of his career. Robin guitars and basses have featured pickups from their sister company, Rio Grande Pickups since 1994.

== Notable users ==
- Stevie Ray Vaughan
- Jimmie Vaughan
- Tim Kelly
- Eric Johnson
- Steve Blaze
- J. Yuenger
- Billy Gibbons
- Butch Walker
- Charlie Burchill
- Pat Smear
- Jimi Hazel
- Rick Skatore
- Pete Anderson
- Scott Dalhover
- Mark May
