= Orville by Gibson =

Japanese-market guitar brand

Orville
- Product type: Musical instruments
- Produced by: Gibson
- Country: Japan
- Introduced: 1988
- Discontinued: 1998; 28 years ago
- Related brands: Epiphone
- Markets: Worldwide

Orville by Gibson (オービルbyギブソン) or Orville (オービル) was a brand of guitars that was managed by the Gibson Guitar Corporation for the Japanese market during the late 1980s and most of the 1990s. The name is borrowed from Orville Gibson, who founded Gibson in 1902.

Products manufactured under the "Orville by Gibson" name were electric guitars and basses.

== History ==
During the 1970s and the 1980s, Japanese guitar companies using brand names such as Ibanez, Tōkai, Burny, and Greco were making high-quality copies of Fender and Gibson guitars. Some brands were sold only on the Japanese market, but other brands such as Ibanez were also exported. Fender and Gibson opened Japanese branch divisions to make guitars in Japan using the Fender/Squier or Gibson/Epiphone brand names for the Japanese market.

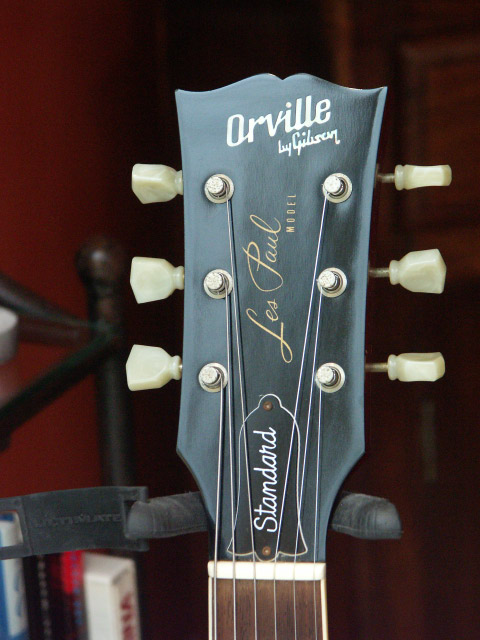
An Orville guitar headstock

Fender established Fender Japan in 1982 and contracted Yamano Gakki (山野楽器) and Kanda Shokai (神田商会) to oversee the production and distribution of Fender Japan guitars in cooperation with Fender. Yamano Gakki (Gakki meaning "musical instrument(s)") are one of Japan's largest musical instrument distributors and retailers, and Kanda Shokai are one of Japan's largest musical instrument distributors. Gibson established Epiphone Japan in the early 1970s with the production and distribution being managed by Aria in cooperation with Gibson.

The Aria and Gibson Epiphone Japan partnership ended in 1983 with the production of Epiphone guitars for export being moved to Korea. In 1987 Yamano Gakki obtained the Gibson and Epiphone dealership in Japan. Yamano Gakki distributed Gibson and Korean Epiphone guitars and also produced a limited range of Epiphone Japan semi-acoustic guitars in cooperation with Gibson.

In 1988, Yamano Gakki decided to expand the Epiphone Japan model range to include solid body models as well as semi-acoustic models. Gibson and Yamano Gakki decided not to use the Epiphone brand name for the expanded model range and so the Orville name was chosen instead, Orville being the first name of Gibson's founder Orville Gibson. When the "Orville by Gibson" series was launched in 1988, Gibson was also selling American-made Gibson guitars, Japanese-made Epiphone guitars, and Korean-made Epiphone guitars in Japan. The Orville by Gibson series were distributed by Yamano Gakki and were priced midway between the American-made Gibson guitars and the Korean-made Epiphone guitars.

There were a number of changes to the Orville by Gibson model range between their beginning in 1988 and their end in 1998. Production ceased in 1998 due to Gibson and Yamano Gakki deciding to export an expanded Epiphone Japan model range that included solid body and semi acoustic models. Gibson and Yamano Gakki ended their relationship in late 2006.

== Epiphone Japan ==
Epiphone Japan was first established by Gibson in the early 1970s with the dealership mostly being managed by Aria in cooperation with Gibson. The Matsumoku guitar factory in Japan was used to make the Aria Epiphone Japan guitars. In 1983, Epiphone export production moved from Japan to Korea and In 1987, Yamano Gakki obtained the Epiphone Japan dealership and produced a limited range of Epiphone Japan semi acoustic models in cooperation with Gibson. The Terada guitar factory in Japan was used to make the Yamano Gakki Epiphone Japan guitars. After Gibson and Yamano Gakki ended Orville production in 1998, Gibson and Yamano Gakki produced an expanded Epiphone Japan model range including solid body as well as semi acoustic models.

Some of the Gibson/Yamano Gakki Epiphone Japan guitars were exported. The Epiphone Japan guitars that were intended for export do not have a Gibson style open book headstock. The Epiphone Japan open book headstock guitars were produced for the Japanese market only. The same Terada and Fuji-Gen guitar factories that made all of the Orville by Gibson and Orville guitars were used to make the Gibson/Yamano Gakki Epiphone Elite and Epiphone Elitist series with the Terada guitar factory mostly making the semi acoustic models and the Fuji-Gen guitar factory mostly making the solid body models. Gibson and Yamano Gakki ended their relationship in late 2006.
