= Burny =

Japanese electric guitar brand

Burny was a brand of electric guitars produced by Fernandes Guitars. Initially used on their range of Gibson replica guitars, the Burny brand was also used as a name on some of their 1970s Stratocaster copies (Burny Olds and Burny Custom) and later used as a brand line for original designs.

== History ==
The Fernandes company was established in 1969 in Japan. Its Burny brand was used for the Gibson replica guitars while the Fernandes brand was used for the Fender replica guitars. Fernandes initially made acoustic guitars and started making electric guitars in late 1973. The Burny Les Paul models first appeared in 1975. Steve Jones from the Sex Pistols has used Burny guitars as has Hide from X Japan, Mike Clark of Suicidal Tendencies, Robert Fripp of King Crimson, Steve Hackett of Genesis, Billie Joe of Green Day and Duff McKagan in his side project Loaded. Andy Latimer of Camel also uses a flame top Burny Super Grade as his main Les Paul-style guitar. Chris Rockson of The Pyratz also uses Burny Les Pauls, including a rare Purple tiger finished Studio.

== Characteristics ==
The original selling price in Japanese Yen was often included in the model number for example FLG-90 = 90000 Japanese Yen. The higher priced Burny electric guitars had VH-1 Gibson PAF style pickups installed from 1985 onward. The early VH-1 pickups, starting in 1983 (installed in Burnys from 1985 to 1987) are approximately 7.5 kΩ DC resistance, are handwound, and have alnico magnets. The VH-1 pickups from 1987 onward are approximately 8.2 kΩ DC resistance, have ceramic magnets, and are not wax potted. The early VH-1 pickups have metal braided shielded wire; the later versions have plastic covered wire.

During the 80's and 90's, the Burny Les Pauls have fret edge binding and most models were finished with a thin polyurethane finish with only a few high end models having nitrocellulose lacquer finishes. The FLG-240, FLG-150, FLG-90 Les Paul models and the FSA-80 Semi Acoustic model were made by Terada from 1980 to 1981. The RLG-150, RLG-120, and RLG-90 models were made by Kasuga from 1982 to 1984. Some Burny guitars from the 1970s and 1980s had a tenon-and-dowel neck joint similar to what was used on some Greco guitars. Burny guitars made by Matsumoku in 1985-86 had a screw-down bolt tenon that was also used on many Matsumoku-made Aria guitars.

The early Burny Les Paul models had a "Les Paul model" logo on the headstock that was discontinued in 1978 and later changed to a "Super Grade model" logo in 1981. The nomenclature "FLG-XX" on Burny models was changed to "RLG-XX" in late 1980 as the Revival era began. Burny has made unofficial signature models recreating famous artist guitars such as the Randy Rhoads LC-70RR and with VH-1 pickups and fret edge binding. Fernandes has also made acoustic guitars using the Fernandes and Burny brand names. Fernandes currently has guitars made in Japan and China, but have been manufacturing in USA, Korea and Vietnam as well. Fernandes does not have its own guitar manufacturing factories, and relies on OEM guitar manufacturers to make its guitars. The latest ProSpec one-off models from 2020 onwards are said to be made in-house, though.

Fernandes used many different factories to manufacture Burny guitars, including Terada, Tōkai, Kasuga, Matsumoku, Dyna Gakki and FujiGen. Fernandes/Burny Japanese Acoustics up till 1982 were made by Hayashi Gakki and from 1982 by Headway. Before Fernandes shut its doors in 2024, Chinese Burnys were made by Yako Musical Instruments Co. (Taiwan) and have an FG- prefix before their serial numbers noted on the back of headstocks.
