= Starcaster by Fender =

Range of electric guitars and accessories

"Starcaster by Fender" Starcaster
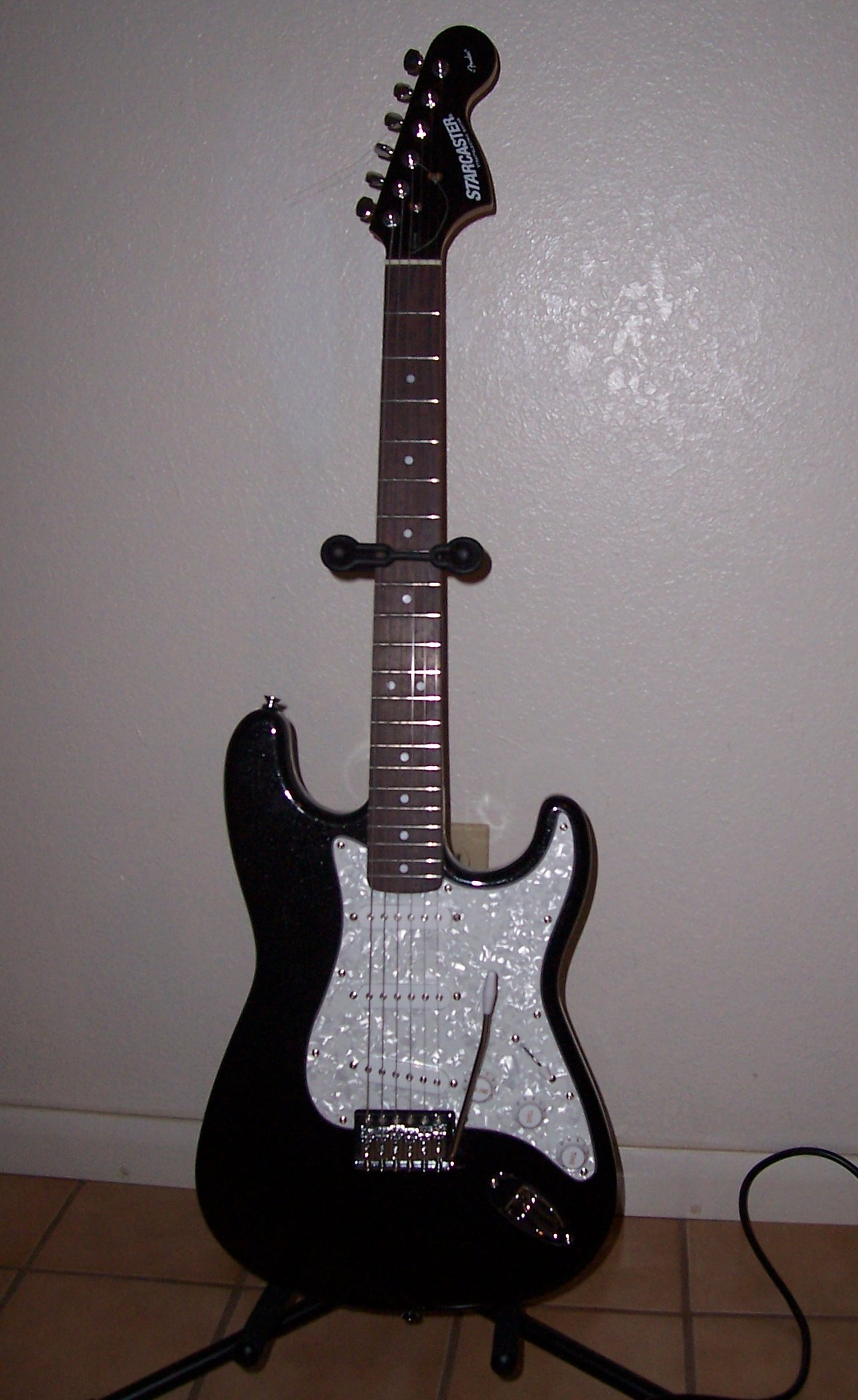
- Manufacturer: Fender
- Period: 2001–2014

Woods
- Body: basswood or agathis
- Neck: Maple
- Fretboard: Rosewood or Maple

Hardware
- Bridge: Tremolo or hardtail
- Pickup(s): 3 single-coil, 2 single-coil + bridge humbucker or single bridge humbucker.

Colors available
- 3-Tone Sunburst, Black, Purple, Torino Red, Candy Apple Red, Black Cherry burst over flame top maple, Metallic Black, Metallic Blue, Silver Burst, flat grey.

Starcaster by Fender is a range of instruments and accessories aimed at students and beginners, marketed by the Fender Musical Instruments Corporation from the early 2000s until at least 2011. As of April 2018, no products were being marketed under this brand.

== Electric guitars ==
The electric guitars in this range were manufactured in East Asia, and typically sold as part of a starter package along with a Squier SP-10 practice amplifier (e.g. "Starcaster Strat Pack"). In 2006–2007 the Fender website identified them as being sold through Best Buy, Target, Sam's Club and Costco outlets. Different finishes were available exclusively at each outlet, for example, three-tone sunburst with rosewood fretboard from Best Buy, black with maple fingerboard from Target and metallic black with rosewood fingerboard and pearloid scratchplate (Model No. 0283001165) from Sam's Club. Although the range was withdrawn from the Fender website in 2007, it continued to be developed and was sold through a variety of other outlets, such as BJ's Wholesale Club, Amazon.com and Buy.com. Most of these guitars were Stratocasters, but some early versions (sometimes called S1) had an arrow-shaped headstock similar to that of the Fender Swinger.

The typical Starcaster Strat Pack solid-body electric was fitted with three single-coil pickups, a five-way selector switch and a floating tremolo bridge. The neck on models up to 2011 features the large CBS headstock and may have 21 or 22 frets, depending on the model. Some models have the headstock painted to match the guitar body. Later Starcaster models feature the smaller Fender headstock. The body may be basswood or agathis depending on model and year of manufacture. To bring down cost, other minor changes, such as a lower-grade tremolo, were made, and the Starcaster was manufactured in Far Eastern countries such as China or Indonesia. The pickup cavity is routed to allow an H-S-H pickup configuration, which allows for flexibility in pickup arrangement. Although most models feature the classic Stratocaster configuration of three single-coil pickups, at least one uses the H-S-S pickup configuration with a humbucker in the bridge position.

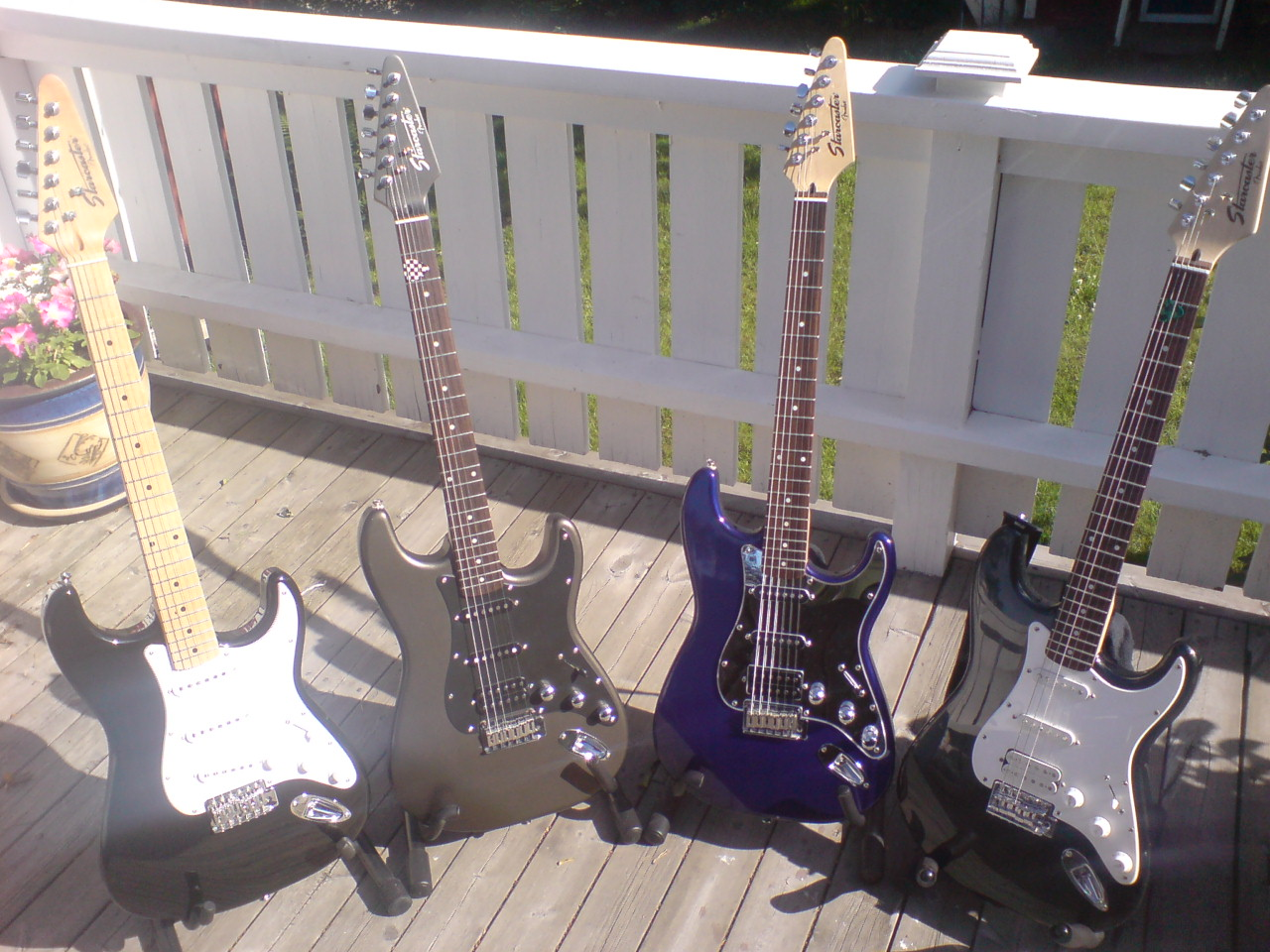
Starcaster S1, 2004–2006

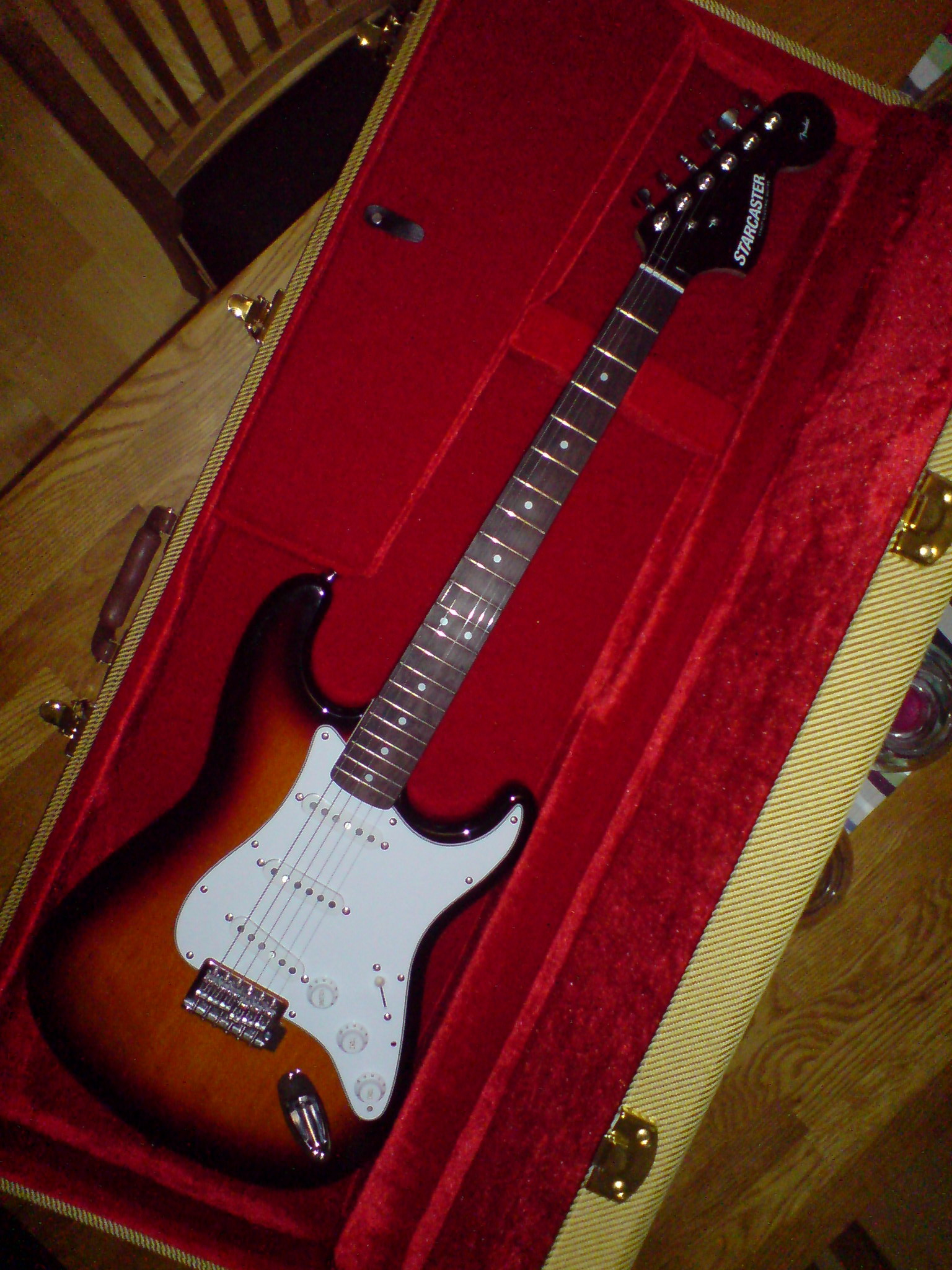
Starcaster S2 2008

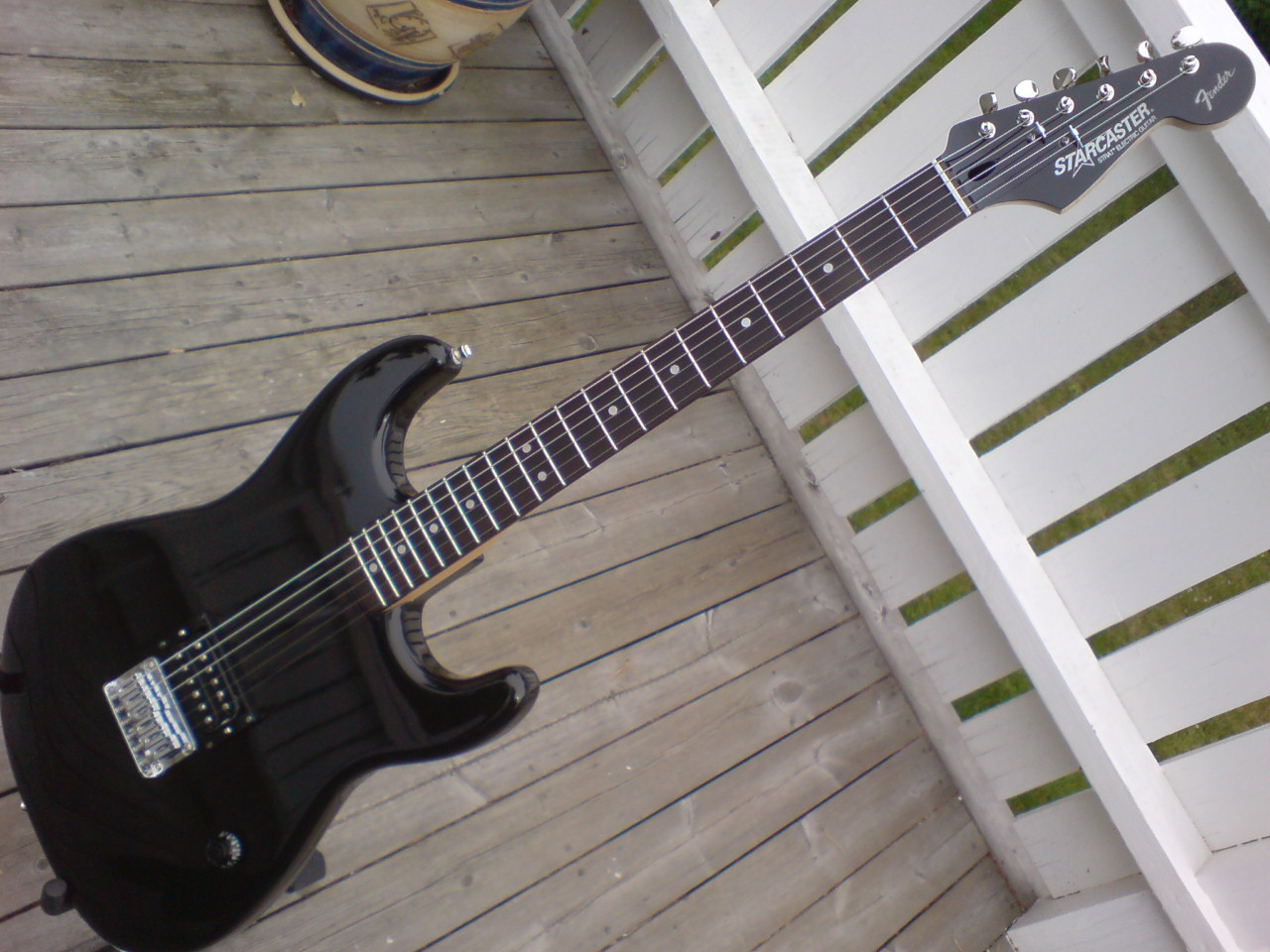
2011 Starcaster, Single humbucker

== Bass guitars ==
Bass guitars under the Starcaster name are rare; one is model no. 284800108, the Starcaster J-Bass guitar, based on the Fender Jazz Bass. The Precision Bass model is even rarer.

== Acoustic/electric guitars ==
The following steel-string acoustic/electric guitars have been seen under the Starcaster by Fender name:

- A single cutaway acoustic/electric guitar with solid spruce top, built-in pickup and pre-amp.
- A dreadnought acoustic guitar with laminated spruce top, available also as an acoustic/electric with built-in pickup and pre-amp and a third version adding built-in tuner, with 20 frets, 25.3" scale length, 1.69" width at nut, 2.24" width at heel and 3.94"–4.92" body depth.
- A 3/4 scale "Starcaster Colt" acoustic guitar.

== Amplifiers and effect pedals ==
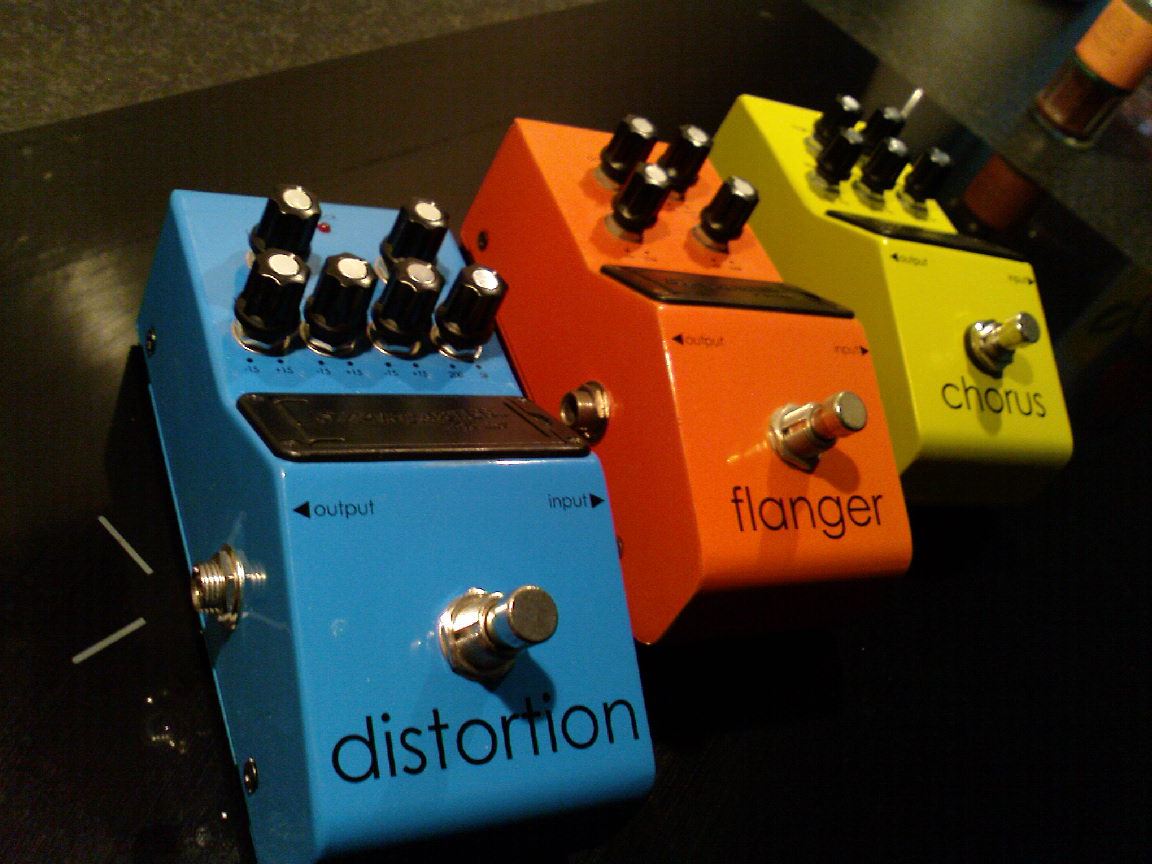
Fender Starcaster pedals

In late 2007 Fender introduced a low-priced amplifier and range of effect pedals under the Starcaster by Fender name. These included a blue distortion pedal, a green-yellow chorus pedal, an orange flanger pedal and the "Starcaster 15G" 15W amplifier.

== Drum set ==
Fender also marketed a drum set under the Starcaster by Fender name. Its shells are made of hardwood. The set features a floor tom, two rack toms, a kick drum, snare, hi-hat and crash cymbals, stands, pedals, a drum chair, tuning key and drumsticks. In the UK these were sold by Tesco and Argos.

An electronic "table-top" drum kit TT-1, model no. 0887004001, was introduced to the range in 2009, featuring seven touch-response pads, two pedals and MIDI input and output.
