= Fender Japan =

Japanese guitar manufacturer and seller

Fender Japan, Ltd. was a joint venture between Fender Musical Instruments Corporation, Kanda Shokai (神田商会), Yamano Gakki (山野楽器) and Fujigen Gakki to produce and sell Fender-branded instruments for the Japanese market. The collaboration began in 1982 and ended on March 31, 2015, with Fender's launch of Fender Music Corporation (Japan) taking over the Japanese business effective April 1, 2015 with a Fender-manufactured product line. The Japanese-made Fender guitars sold by Fender Music Corporation (Japan) have since been categorized as the "Japan Exclusive" series.

== History ==
In the late 1970s, Fender was facing competition from lower-priced Japanese-made guitars. The higher-priced Fender guitars were made in the United States and could not compete directly with Japanese-made Fender copies. In Japan, Fender was also losing sales to Japanese guitar brands such as Tōkai, Greco and Fernandes. Since Japanese labor and production costs were much lower than in the United States, Fender moved the lower-priced Fender guitar production to Japan and began negotiations with several Japanese musical instrument distributors.

In March 1982, Fender Japan, Ltd. was officially established as a joint venture between Fender, Kanda Shokai (神田商会), Yamano Gakki (山野楽器) and Fujigen Gakki as the major share holders.

Kanda Shokai is a musical instrument wholesaler that does not own any retail outlets of its own. Kanda Shokai also owns the brand name Greco. One of the conditions in the Fender Japan agreement was that Kanda Shokai cease production of its Greco Fender copies. Yamano is another musical instrument wholesaler/retailer with its own retail outlets and was once a part of the Orville by Gibson venture. Neither company manufactures guitars, instead ordering them from Japanese guitar factories and distribute them through retail outlets. Yamano distributes through its own retail outlets and also various other retail outlets, while Kanda Shokai distributes through various retail outlets, including the Ishibashi chain of music stores in Japan.

The Japanese guitar factories that produced Fender Japan guitars at various times were FujiGen Gakki, and Dyna Gakki and for a brief time Tokai Gakki produced some instruments for sale in Japan only.

== Manufacturers ==
At the beginning of the Fender Japan venture, Tokai was considered for the manufacturing contract, but at the insistence of Fender USA, FujiGen Gakki was chosen instead. They held the contract from 1982 until 1995. Beginning in 1995, some parts were manufactured for Fender Japan by Dyna Gakki, which took over the manufacturing contract in 1996.

Terada made the Fender Japan acoustic guitars such as the Fender Catalina.

=== "Made in Japan" and "Crafted in Japan" labels ===
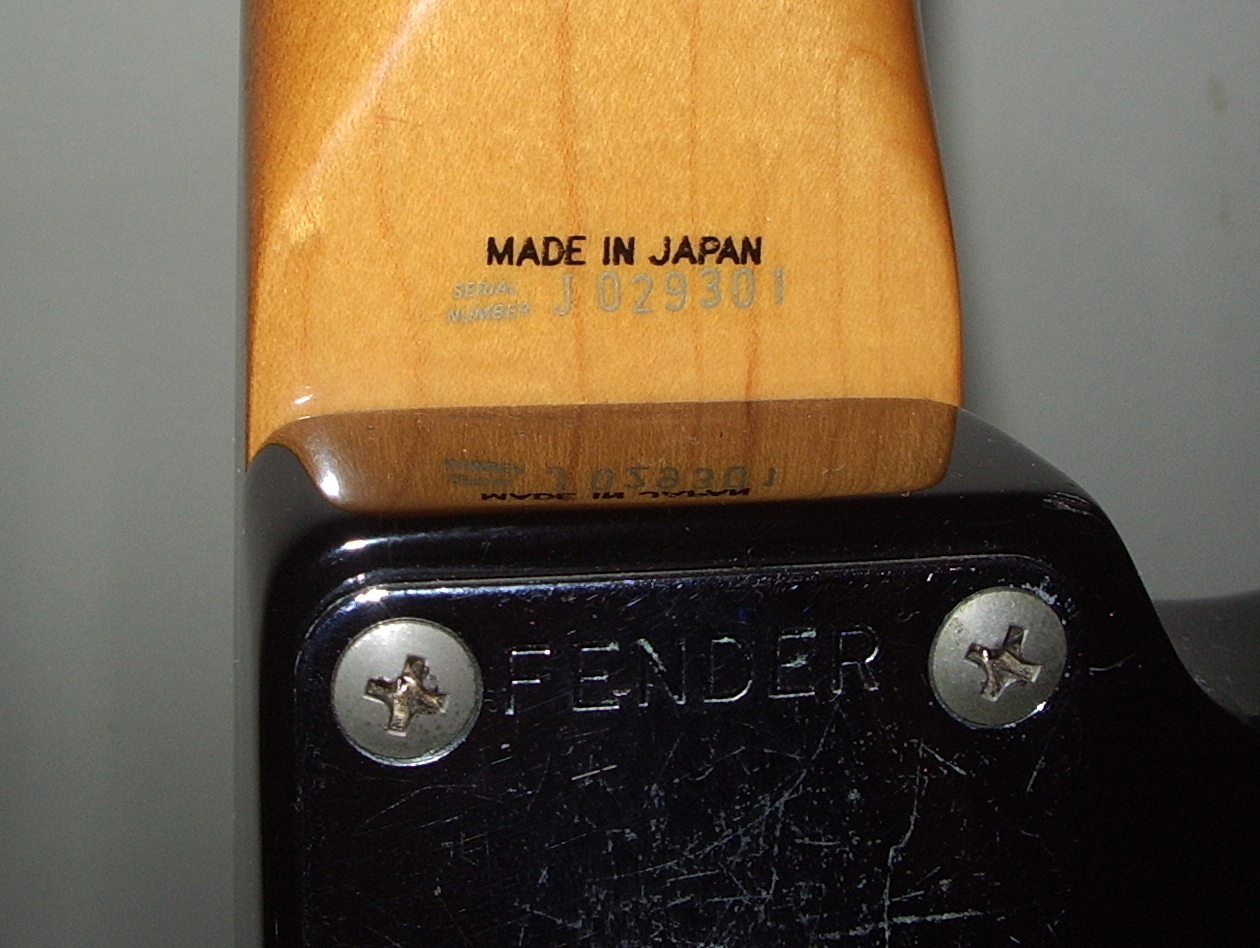
MADE IN JAPAN serial number

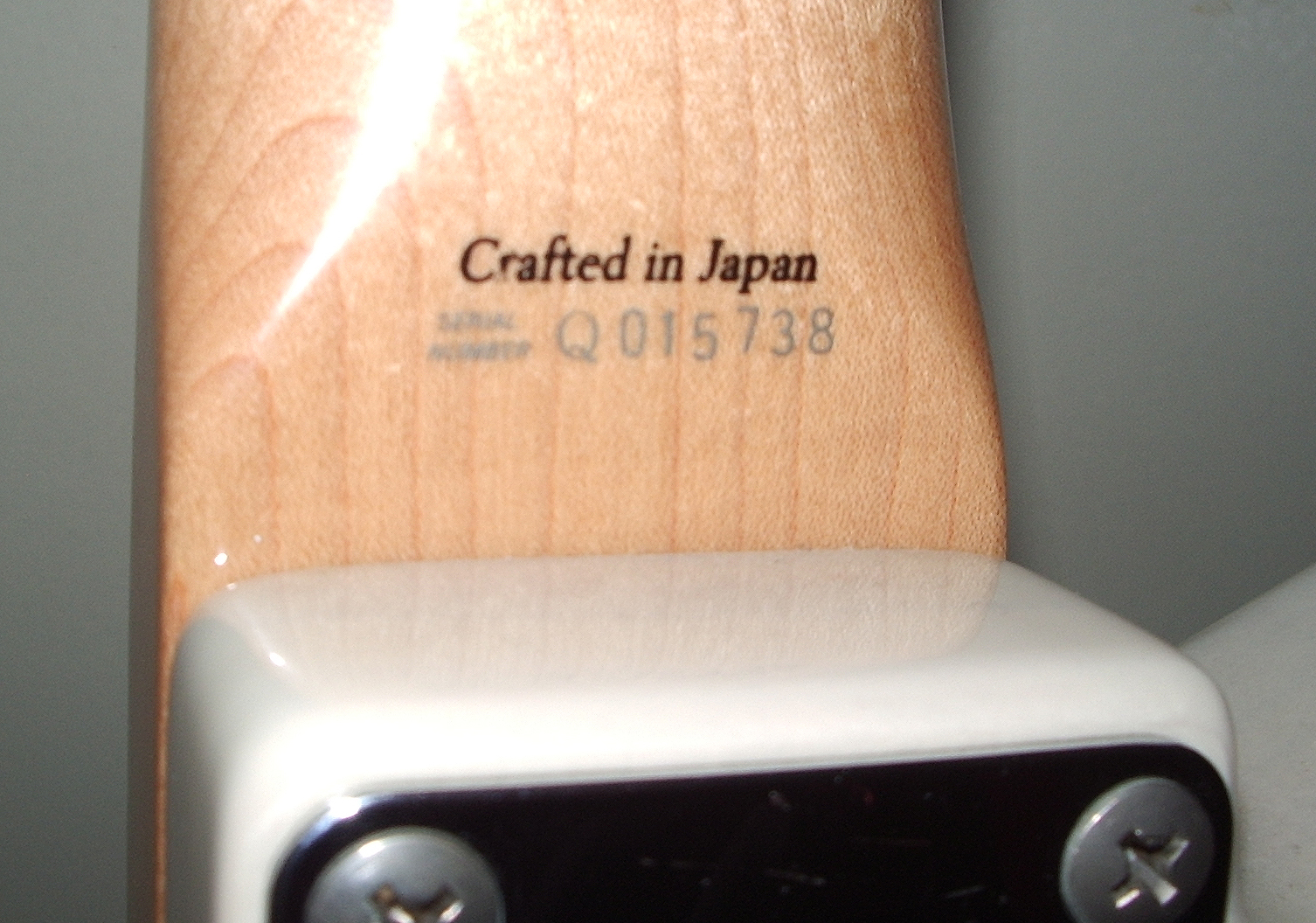
Crafted in Japan serial number

The change in OEM contractor resulted in a change in country-of-origin labels, allowing some indication which factory manufactured a particular guitar. A "Made in Japan" (MIJ) label was used for guitars manufactured by FujiGen until 1995. A "Crafted in Japan" (CIJ) label started being used in 1995 when Dyna Gakki took over some of the production of parts for Fender Japan. It continued to be used after Dyna took over the full Fender Japan manufacturing contract in 1996. After 2007, the labeling changed again to "Made in Japan" (MIJ). However, both labels were used for several years.

== Timeline ==
1982: Fender Japan starts production with FujiGen Gakki having the manufacturing contract. The "Made in Japan" (MIJ) logo is used.

1984: CBS sells Fender to new owners, and while waiting for a new US factory to begin production, Fender Japan models and leftover US stock were the only Fender products available.

1995: The first "Crafted in Japan" (CIJ) models start appearing due to Dyna Gakki taking over some of the manufacturing while FujiGen Gakki were expanding their operations.

1996: Dyna Gakki fuly takes over the manufacturing contract from FujiGen Gakki.

2015: Fender USA, Yamano, and Kanda Shokai end the Fender Japan joint venture on March 31, 2015. Fender becomes sole owner of the Japanese business effective April 1, 2015.

== Sources ==
- 1986/1987 tour of Fujigen factory, Rainer Daeschler
- (in Japanese) FujiGen Gakki History
