= Maxon Effects =

Maxon
- Company type: Private
- Industry: Consumer electronics
- Founded: 1965; 61 years ago
- Headquarters: Tokyo, Japan
- Products: effects pedals
- Parent: Nisshin Onpa
- Website: Official website

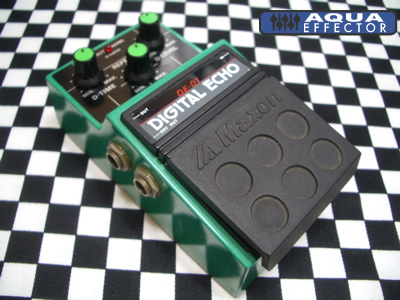
A Maxon pedal

Maxon is the brand name used by the Nisshin Onpa company of Japan for its line of effects pedals designed for guitar and bass.

== History ==
Nisshin Onpa started mid-1960s as a producer of components and OEM products for guitar companies. First building guitar pickups for the Greco-brand electric guitars produced by Kanda Shokai, Nisshin Onpa in 1969 also became an effects pedal manufacturer. They created a fuzz-wah pedal that was very popular, and marketed under multiple trade names including Ibanez.

During the 1970s, Ibanez became one of the company's main OEM customers. Nisshin Onpa designed and manufactured the popular TS-808/TS808 and TS9 Tube Screamers for Ibanez from 1974 until 2002, and many other devices including the FL9 Flanger, CS9 Chorus, and AD9 Analog Delay. After splitting from Ibanez, Maxon continued manufacturing pedals under the "Maxon" brand, bringing them into North and South America via Godlyke Distributing, Inc., with that distribution agreement ending in 2020.

Nisshin Onpa also marketed its pedals under its own Maxon brand before 2002. When Nisshin Onpa and Ibanez parted ways in 2002, Nisshin Onpa began to more aggressively market its own line, expanding its line of analog pedals. Maxon now concentrates on vintage-type effects such as analog delays, analog choruses and flangers, and overdrive and distortion units. Most of the old Ibanez Nine Series is available in Maxon form, but the pedals include improved circuitry such as true-bypass switching.

Currently, Maxon manufactures around 23 effects pedals for guitars.

Video of the Maxon PT999 Phase Tone phaser pedal.

Nisshin Onpa has manufactured pickups for Aria, Ibanez and Greco guitars. The Ibanez "Super 70" and "Super 58" pickups and also the Greco "UD", "U-1000", "U-2000", "PU-x" and "Dry Z" pickups were made by Nisshin Onpa.

Ibanez "Super 70" and Greco "U-1000" pickups had an alnico VIII magnet. Greco "U-2000" and "PU-x" pickups had an alnico V magnet. Ibanez "Super 58" and Greco "Dry-Z" pickups had an alnico III magnet. Ibanez "Super 80" pickups had a ceramic magnet. In all of these, DC resistance is approximately 7.5-8.0 kiloohms.

On its website, Maxon claims several firsts in the effects pedal industry: the first realistic tube amp overdrive, the first compact analogue delay, the first programmable effect, and the first multi effect unit.
