= Matsuoka Guitar =

Japanese guitar manufacturer (1959–2014)

- Ryoji Matsuoka's signature
- Native name: 松岡楽器
- Formerly: Matsuoka Musical Instruments Co., Ltd.
- Company type: Private
- Industry: Musical instruments
- Founded: 1959
- Founder: Ryoji Matsuoka
- Fate: Bankruptcy in 2014
- Headquarters: Nagoya, Japan
- Area served: Worldwide
- Key people: Ryoji Matsuoka; Toshiaki Matsuoka
- Products: Classical guitar
- Number of employees: 15
- Website: www.matsuoka-gakki.com

Matsuoka Guitar (formerly Matsuoka Musical Instruments Co., Ltd.) was a Japanese manufacturer of guitars in Nagoya, Japan.

Self taught luthier Ryoji Matsuoka began making guitars following World War 2 as the popularity of enka music helped introduce more Japanese to the guitar. After about a decade of refining his skill, he established Matsuoka Musical Instruments Co., Ltd. in 1959. Matsuoka is a boutique firm specializing in well made classical guitars for entry to mid level players.

Influenced by luthiers such as Hauser, Kohno, and Ramírez, Matsuoka produced guitars for Aria and Ibanez in the 1960s and 1970s, and produced his own line starting in the early 1970s. Up to the early 80’s Ryoji Matsuoka himself handcrafted the top of the line (Mastercraft) models for Ibanez.

Matsuoka's son Toshiaki followed in his father's as a luthier and oversaw the day-to-day operations of the company until its dissolution in 2014.https://www.instagram.com/ryoji.matsuoka singapore/
