= Sigma Guitars =

American musical instrument brand

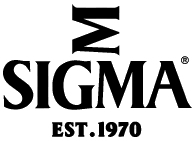
- Product type: Musical instruments
- Current owner: AMI GmbH
- Produced by: Japan
- Country: U.S.
- Introduced: 1970; 56 years ago
- Previous owners: C. F. Martin & Company (1970–2007)
- Website: sigma-guitars.com

Sigma Guitars is a guitar manufacturing brand originally released by C.F. Martin & Company as a line of guitars at affordable prices to compete with the increasing number of imported guitars from Japan and elsewhere. The Sigma line was discontinued by Martin in 2007. The rights to the name were acquired by German company AMI Musical Instruments GmbH, which relaunched the brand with guitars being produced in China.

Since the U.S. rights to the Sigma brand name and trademark had been allowed to lapse by C.F. Martin & Co. prior to selling the brand to AMI, and had since been picked up by St. Louis Music of Missouri, AMI is not allowed to use the brand name "Sigma" in the U.S. for their current line of guitars. They were distributed and sold in the U.S. as Kindred Guitars.

The current range of Sigma instruments include acoustic and classical guitars, acoustic basses and ukuleles.

== History ==
American company C.F. Martin & Company created the brand Sigma in order to compete with cheaper guitars that were imported from Asia. Sigma released a wide series of acoustic and classical guitars, which initial construction was in Japan by various manufacturers/factories from 1970 through 1983.

The first Sigmas were typically dreadnought acoustic, although Grand Concert Series (GCS) and classical models were also produced from the early 1970s (1971?) onward. Though other models were produced the most common two throughout the 1970s were the Dreadnought models DM-5 (DM12-5) and DR-7 (DR12-7.) D for dreadnought, R for rosewood, M for mahogany and the number denoting the grade of wood, 5, 7, 9, 11, 15.

Construction moved from Japan from 1970 to 1983, to Korea from 1984 to 1994, to Taiwan in 1994 (made in both Korea and Taiwan for the 1994 model year) and finally Indonesia (?–2007).

In 1978, model designations were added to match Martin model numbers: the DM-18, DM-19, DR-28, DR-28H, DR-35, DR-41, and DR-45. They are called 'Second Generation' Sigma's by C.F. Martin and featured solid wood top. The "First Generation" DM-5 and DR-7 (laminate wood bodies and tops), as well as other early models (e.g., the GCS-7/CS-7), remained in production during this time as well.

The 2006 and 2007 models showed a marked increase in quality, as it is thought Martin was prepping the company for sale.

== Pegheads and logos ==
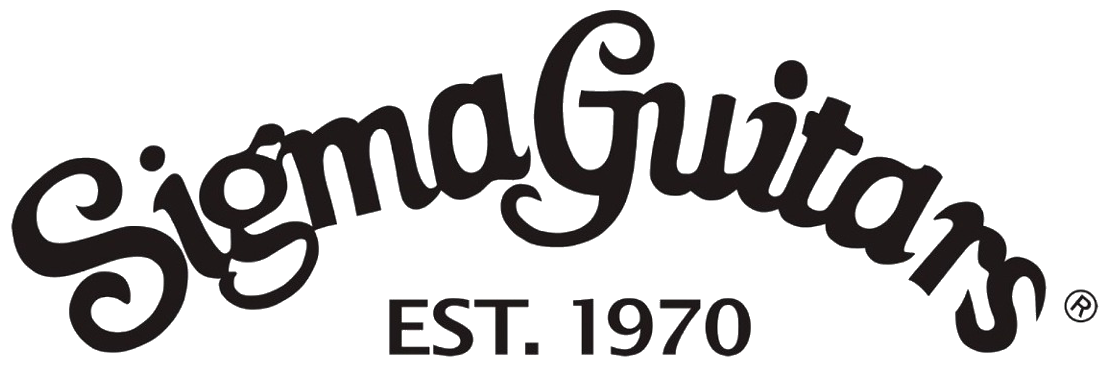
Sigma 2nd Series logo 1976-1993

Sigma guitars were made in Japan from 1970 through 1983. The early 1970s models (1970–1975) can be distinguished by a more squared peghead, shaped similarly to that of a "spatula." The original brand logo resembled the C.F. Martin logo, using the same typography. The current logo under AMI consists of a single word in block lettering "Sigma" surmounted with the "Σ" symbol (the Greek letter sigma). The sigma symbol is often described as a "sideways M."

While retaining the same early logo for several more years (c.1975–1976) the peghead itself began to take on a more tapered shape by 1972. On right-handed models while playing a Sigma guitar the "sideways M" becomes "right side up" suggesting "M" for Martin.

By the mid-1970s (c.1976) the headstock logo design changed to a gold "Martin-style" decal that said "Sigma Guitars" in script with "Est. 1970" underneath in a smaller block font. The headstock shape was also modified to a deeper taper and shaped to resemble the Martin instruments.

As is traditional with classical instruments, Sigma classical guitars do not have the headstock logo, and one must rely on the inner label for identification.

== Labels and brands ==
Sigmas made in Japan from 1970 through 1979 used a paper label to identify the model and serial number of the instrument. The model and serial numbers were usually stamped on in ink, but some are known to have been hand-penned. This is especially true of unusual, special (sample/prototype models) and/or low production number models (e.g.: DT-30.)

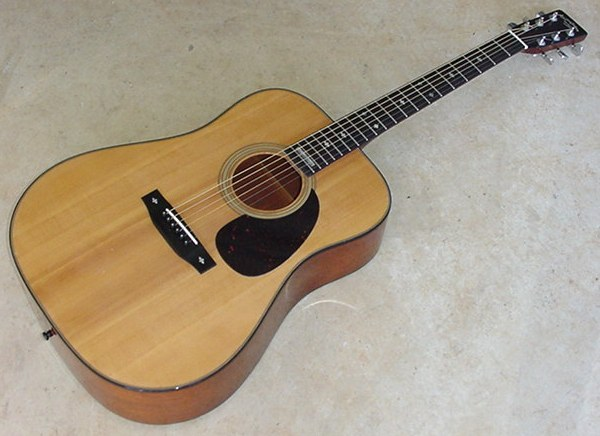
1980 Sigma D-10 Anniversary Guitar

- 'Black and White' label: The earliest examples had a plain black on white inner paper label showing the model and serial numbers. These will show a four-digit serial number.
- 'Gold' label: The next generation of labels are transition labels that are white with Sigma and three horizontal lines in gold ink, the Greek sigma in black and printed black text (Made for C.F. Martin & Co, etc.) everywhere else. These will have a 4, 5 or 8 digit (7*0XXXXX) serial number stamped or hand written on them.
- 'Purple' label (c.1972 onward): These are again white labels that had gold & black lettering but this time with a border, often pinkish-brown or violet in color. The Σ symbol now also in this same pink/purple color. All other text was printed in black ink, or stamped on in ink by the manufacturer (model and serial numbers.) Five-digit or eight-digit serial numbers.
- Back Brace Brand: From 1978 through 1983; 1978 being a transition year, one might find the center back brace is pressure stamped, or "branded" in a football shape stating Sigma Guitars/Made in Japan/For/C.F. Martin & Co. Being a mid-year change, some continued on with the "Purple" label, though with the new serial number designation preceded by an "S" or an "E" This is prefixed by the serial number assigned to the instrument and followed by an ink stamp of the model number. (e.g. L-R as seen through the sound hole: Serial number, "Brand," Model number.) The serial numbers on these instruments were often preceded by the letters S or E; e.g. S0XXXXX. It is currently believed that this transition was complete by 1979.

Early Korean-made guitars show this same brand, only stating Made in Korea in place of Made in Japan. During later Korean-made years (c.1990), Sigma transitioned back to paper labels and they stayed that way until the end of production in Indonesia in 2007.

== Serial numbers ==
Under the best of circumstances, Sigma serial numbers can only provide an indicator of the year when a particular model was built. This may be due to them being built in several Japanese factories at the same time with no coordination or tracking in the numbering system. However, while some models lasted the entire run from 1970 through 1983, others did not and were only offered for a limited number of years. Other physical indicators or attributes, such as finish, trim, tuners, etc., can help determine the approximate construction date of a particular example, but almost never exactly.

For example, serial numbers on the earliest DR-7s began using four-digit numbers on through five-digit numbers, with some early 1970s models (c.1972–1975) along the way with the unusual 7*0XXXXX, eight-digit system. One original Sigma DR-7 owner stated "I have an old Sigma DR-7 Guitar....s/n 6860. I ?bought it new in 1970." Furthermore, DR-7s with a four-digit ink stamped label serial number, a zero fret and an adjustable bridge saddle strongly suggests a very early ('70-'71) build date.

Some early 1970s Sigma guitar serial numbers (c.1972–1975) began with 7X0 suggesting the 197X build date (e.g. 750XXXXX possibly equates to a build year 1975.) These were eight digits long, the third digit always a place-holding 0, while all others by then were still only five digit serial numbers further adding to the confusion. It is widely assumed by owners and Sigma historians alike that this is correct, though C.F. Martin cannot, or will not confirm this.

Sigma-Martin USA guitars built in 1981 and 1982 only had specifically assigned serial numbers ranging from 900,001 to 902,908 (2,908 in total.) These serial numbers are documented by C.F. Martin & Co. and to this day remain the only Sigma-related serial numbers that are publicly available. These "N" instruments, of which only two models were ever produced, the DR-28N and DR-35N, were partially assembled in Japan and imported to Nazareth ("N") and the Martin guitar factory as kits. Martin completed and finished them alongside the regular Martin production line. Bridges and tuners may have been installed, as well final sanding and finishing before strings were installed and a final set-up was done. Because more than 30% of the work was completed within the borders of the United States, Martin was legally allowed to designate them as Made in U.S.A.

Serial numbers for Sigma guitars built in South Korea, Taiwan and Indonesia are perhaps even more meaningless, though again some seem to indicate the year of manufacture (e.g. loop81XXXXXX.) Since we know these instruments were manufactured from 1984 through 2007 in these three countries, it is safe to assume that a serial number beginning with 81XXXXXX (which I have personally seen) were not produced in 1981 and that these serial number 'indicators' are not to be trusted.

In 1978-'79 the paper labels were discontinued and the inner back brace was "branded." Later Korean production show a resurgence in the paper label system for model and serial number, sometimes along with the brand. These had an even fancier border. High end models such as the D-10 Anniversary model have the "Second Generation" logo inlaid in the headstock using mother of pearl, as do many of the later Korean produced instruments.

Some guitars made later in Taiwan and Indonesia have a different headstock shape and decal: The shape is more squared off at the top corners, while the decal states, "Sigma Guitars" on top with a miniature version of the "C.F. Martin & Co." logo underneath. Some of these guitars also had the "Est 1970" instead of the C.F. Martin & Co.," using a slightly different block font that is both fatter & wider than the original 2nd series instruments. The paper labels for model/serial number identification had also changed again, this time with a fancy border and the word "Sigma" or "Sigma Guitars" printed in gold ink.

In the 1970s Sigma produced a line of guitars with model numbers starting with 52S, e.g., 52SDM-5, 52SDR-7 and 52SGCS-7. While it was thought at one time that these were somehow 'special' and had solid tops, later research dismisses this. Current documentation (taken from the files at Martin) indicates these models were produced by the Kasuga Gakki company as overload for the Tokai Gakki company. No solid top Sigma under the numerical model designation "8" exists, save for the DM-1ST (Solid Top.) Further, tests conducted on the 52S models with model numbers below "8" show that they are, in fact, wholly laminate bodies. Models such as the 52SDR-9, 52SDR-11, 52SDR-14 and 52SDR-15 do have solid spruce tops and are considered the predecessors to the "Second Generation" models: Most Sigma guitars under the numerical model number 8 are wholly laminate bodies (exception is the DM-1ST.)

The Sigma Generation III brochure listed the features of the SDR-28 and SDR-28H rosewood dreadnoughts as a solid spruce top, scalloped top bracing, rosewood back, sides, fingerboard and bridge, and a carved mahogany neck, and said the guitars were inspected and prepared by Martin and carried a limited lifetime warranty.

Other Sigma instruments included mandolins, banjos, acoustic and electric bass guitars and solid-body and hollow body electric guitars. Some solid body electric guitars were made by Tokai Guitars Company, LTD.

After Sigma musical instruments were built in Japan, Korea, Taiwan and finally Indonesia, they were sent to Martin & Co. in Nazareth, Pennsylvania to be inspected and adjusted by Martin personnel before going to an authorized retail dealer for sale to the public. These inspections and adjustments were made in the "old" Martin building on North St. (1859), then known as the Import house.

The DR-28 was manufactured in Japan, Korea and Taiwan while the SDR-28 and the SDR-28H appear to have been manufactured in Korea and Taiwan only, starting in early 1986. The DR-28 and SDR-28 have a solid spruce top with laminate rosewood sides and back. The SDR models also feature "scalloped" bracing à la Martin's own HD-28 with the addition of herringbone design around the binding.

The DR-28 and SDR-28 and SDR-28H are clones to the original Martin D-28 and HD-28 guitars. It has been suggested that these Second Generation branded instruments were the precursor, or pilot program for what has now become C.F. Martins own in-house, less expensive, "LX" series of laminated wood guitars

Martin discontinued the Sigma line in 2007, and in 2011 the German company "AMI Musical Instruments GmbH" (AMI) acquired the rights to the brand from C.F. Martin and relaunched Sigma Guitars worldwide. However, after a year or more of AMI energetically reviving the Sigma brand with an extensive 75 model range of acoustic and electric/acoustic instruments, all closely following Martin designs, it was discovered that C.F.Martin had, inexplicably allowed their rights to the Sigma brand name in US territories to lapse.

United States law states that: "In contrast to copyright or patent law, trademark protection does not have a set duration or definite expiration date. Trademark rights ... expire when the owner stops using the mark in commerce ... federal trademark registrations expire ten years after the registration date, unless renewed within one year prior to the expiration."

Furthermore, the US rights to the lapsed ‘Sigma’ brand name had expired prior to C.F. Martin's intended sale of the brand to AMI and has been revived by St. Louis Music of Missouri, who currently offer a four model range of Martin clones, all sporting a 'block style' Sigma logo similar to the one on the very early Japanese output marketed by C.F. Martin. As a result of this situation it has been necessary for AMI to change the name they sell their guitars in the USA under to Kindred Guitars. This brand name appears to the left of the Sigma banner on sigma-guitars.com.

== Basic characteristics of Made in Japan Sigma guitars ==
From 1970 to approximately 1976:

- Adjustable bridge on all dreadnought (except DJ-7, Dreadnought/Jacaranda) and GCS ("G"rand "C"oncert "S"eries) models, but this too is an inconsistency as not all had the adjustable bridge.
- Peghead is a "spatula" shape that differs from the traditional Martin peghead design in that it is more square than tapered, as the later second-generation models were. These spatula-shaped headstocks only lasted the first few years before taking on a more tapered appearance and shape while still in the early 1970s.
- Original peghead logo Sigma with Greek symbol Σ above,
- Adjustable truss rod through peghead through 1977.
- The first year 1970 DR-7 has a zero fret as well as some of the 12-strings did to approximately 1973, or 1975 (DM12-5.)
- Early examples often have adjustable-height bridge saddles as well. These were discontinued earlier in the 7 series six-string models than the five-series, 12-strings and other "lesser" models. Adjustable saddles are considered less desirable as they did not come in full contact with the bridge and soundboard.

From approximately 1977 to 1983:

- Nonadjustable bridge, often showing a pair of pearloid screw covers.
- Martin-style peghead (tapered)
- "Martin-style" gold decal peghead logo stating "Sigma Guitars" in script with "Est. 1970" underneath in a smaller block font.
- In 1978, some special instruments, such as the D-10 Anniversary (1980 only,) and DR-28H models, have an inset pearl/pearloid logo. The "Est. 1970" is underlined in these cases.
- Adjustable truss bar through peghead from 1970 through 1977. Truss rod adjustments were accessed through the sound hole from 1978 forward. This is another feature that changed back in late production (1990s Korea, Taiwan and Indonesia.)
- From approximately 1978 through 1983, and in later Korean-made instruments with few exceptions, stamps, or "brands" were embossed into the back brace wood instead of using a paper label. Labels would return later during the Korean years (1990s) and continue through final production in Taiwan and Indonesia.

General

The issue of whether or not Sigma guitars are solid wood or "plywood" laminate wood has been a source of controversy and confusion for many years now. All known Sigma guitars have laminated sides and back wood. This is understandable since the Martin customer service department now responds to individual inquiries stating "all" Sigma's had laminate back/sides, while Sigma catalogs from the early 1970s list the back/side wood as "matched", not meaning solid, but as a catalog term for laminate.

The top wood varied. Many had laminated tops. Models designated "Second Generation" or in the "Marquis" series models had solid spruce tops and the cost reflected this upgrade as well, around $100 in USD more.

== Tuning machines ==
There were only a few types of tuning machines used during these years. All were basic and inexpensive. There are three different shapes of the buttons on these tuners. Oval in the early models, a more square shape a la Schaller in style in the middle years, and a keystone shape, or 'wing' on later versions. The lesser six-string models, such as the DM Mahogany series, had open-backed, three-on-a-plate non-adjustable "economy" tuners in the earliest years. Later ones were individual machines, but looked exactly the same from the front. The 12-string models had open-back "six-on-a-plate" (non-adjustable/economy) tuners.

More upscale models, such as the DR Rosewood series, had the same tuners only with chromed cover over them. These were all 'non-adjustable' and held in place by two opposing screws (corner to corner) on the back of the headstock. Styles of this type are still available today with only minor differences.

Early Rosewood series model 12-string guitars (pre-1975) had non-adjustable covered "6-on-a-plate" a la Kluson style tuners. Later versions (approximately 1973 onward) were individual, non-adjustable, as on the 6-stringed models (14:1 ratio.)

Many six-string "upscale" models from 1978 to 1983 instruments had adjustable sealed tuners, but the 12-string models continued with the covered (non-adjustable) "economy" tuners (14:1 ratio.) Others continued on using the cheaper tuners. The earliest sealed tuners, as early as 1972 (e.g. DR-9, DR-11) had a 6-sided cast body and no brand name (11:1 ratio,) while there were others later on that more resembled Schaller (stop screw to the inside, Schaller style buttons.) or Grover tuners (stop screw below but without the familiar crescent knob.) Few of these sealed tuners were branded at all, while others in later years show "Sigma" stamped on their backs.

== Japanese models ==
=== 1970 to approximately 1975 ===
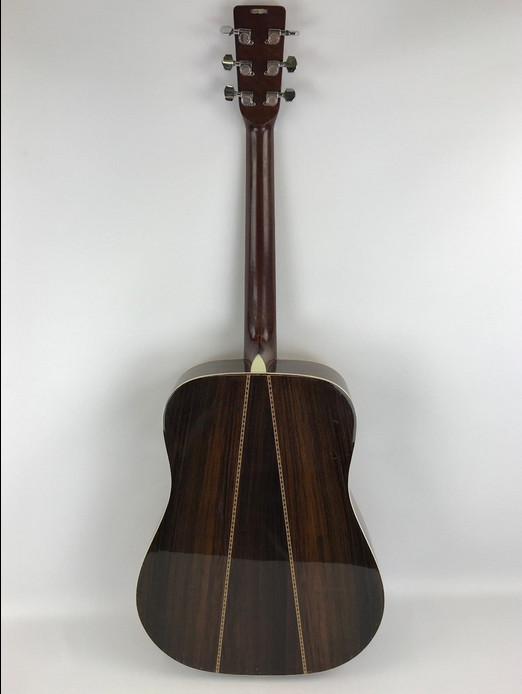
72c Sigma 52SDR-11 made in Japan (back)

- CS-6 Classical guitar. Mosaic marquetry around sound hole. Rosewood Bridge. Laminated Spruce top. Back and sides laminated bubinga wood. Mahogany neck. Rosewood fingerboard. Pearloid buttons on tuners.
- CR-7 Classical guitar. Mosaic marquetry around sound hole. Back and sides laminated rosewood. Top of laminated spruce. Carved peghead. Neck mahogany. Flat-oval neck. Top and back binding black and white. Lacquer finish.
- CR-9 Classical guitar. Solid spruce top, otherwise same specs as the CR-7.
- DM-2, DM-3 Dreadnought's were the same as the next description of the DM-5 with the exception sometimes early models had different machine heads. The main difference is the number designation from 2 thru 5, and was only used to designate a higher quality of wood being used in the making of them. The DM-3s were some of the first left hand models, converted at the factory, left hand nut, bridge, saddle, and pick-guard replaced the right hand components, but they left the right hand fretboard which is evident from the marker positions on the side of the fretboard. When the DM-4's came out, the option for a left hand model became a regular option that could be ordered and was built as a lefty from the factory which included the correct fretboard markers and a new model designation, the DM-4LH. The DM-4LH also had different fretboard inlay markers at the 12th fret (horizontal tear drop).
- DM-4LH Dreadnought Factory made left hand model completely built from the factory as a left hand model. Early left hand models were DM-3's converted at the factory from an already finish constructed DM-3 as a special order.
- DM-5 Dreadnought. Laminate spruce top. Laminate mahogany back and sides. Black binding (b/w/b/w/b.) Natowood neck. Unbound rosewood fingerboard. Nickel-silver frets. Open in-line tuning machines. Adjustable Rosewood Bridge on earliest examples. Adjustable truss rod through peghead from 1970 through 1979. Unbound peghead. Open tuners on early models. Covered "economy" tuners on later ones. High Gloss finish.
- DR-7 Dreadnought. DR-7 Dreadnought. Laminate spruce top. Laminated rosewood back and sides. White binding on body (w/b/w/b/w.) Rosewood overlay on peghead. Peghead bound in white. Adjustable truss rod through peghead from 1970 through 1979. Rosewood Bridge and fingerboard. Adjustable Rosewood Bridge on the earliest models. Pearl/pearloid inlay position markers on fingerboard. Chrome closed back tuners (11:1 ratio.) The first year is known to have a zero fret. High gloss lacquer finish. Truss rod adjustment location is on peg head at nut until 1980. After 1980 truss rod adjustment is located internally and is accessed from soundhole.
- 52SDR-9 Dreadnought (c1972.) Solid spruce top. Laminated rosewood sides and 3-piece back with a contrasting (often highly figured) rosewood center strip. White binding on body (w/b/w/b/w.) Rosewood overlay on 1st generation "Spatula" headstock (Sigma w/Σ logo.) Head-stock and fretboard are single-bound in white. Adjustable truss rod through peg-head. Rosewood fingerboard. Non-adjustable Rosewood Bridge. "Snowflake" (more similar to a Maltese cross) pearl inlay position markers on fingerboard. Chrome closed back tuners (11:1 ratio.) High gloss lacquer finish.
- 52SDR-11 Dreadnought (c1972.) Solid spruce top. Laminated rosewood sides and 3-piece back, ala' D35. White/pearl binding on body (w/p/w/p/w.) Rosewood overlay on 1st generation "Spatula" headstock (Sigma w/Σ logo.)This is also the only known model where the entire logo not just the sigma symbol, is done in mother of pearl. Head-stock and fretboard are single-bound in white. Mother of pearl trim throughout ala' Martin D-41. Adjustable truss rod through sound hole, not the peg-head like the lower end models. Rosewood fingerboard. Non-adjustable Rosewood Bridge. Mother of pearl Hexagon & heptagon inlay position markers on fingerboard. Gold plated closed back tuners (ratio 12:1.) High gloss lacquer finish. This model was considered the top-of-the-line Sigma by Martin. It had features from several of Martin's top-end domestic guitars, but Martin never made one exactly like it; in the United States, it is unique to the Sigma line.
- DJ-7 Dreadnought. Laminated spruce top. Laminated Brazilian jacaranda sides. Three-piece matched grain jacaranda back with marquetry. White binding on body (w/b/w/b/w.) Peghead bound in white. Ebony fingerboard. Mother of pearl inlays on fingerboard. Fixed ebony bridge. Natowood neck. Adjustable truss rod. White/black/white binding. Satin lacquer finish.
- DM12-5 12 String Dreadnought. Laminated spruce top. Laminated mahogany back and sides. Black binding (b/w/b/w/b.) Rosewood bridge (some 'ebonized') and fingerboard. Unbound peghead and fingerboard. Pearl/pearloid position dots. Open inline "6-on-a-plate" tuning machines. Covered "economy" tuners on later examples. Adjustable rosewood bridge to approximately 1975, non-adjustable thereafter. Adjustable truss rod. Earliest models had a zero fret.
- DM12-7 12 String Dreadnought. Laminated spruce top. Laminated rosewood back and sides. White binding on body (w/b/w/b/w.) "Ebonized" (blackened) rosewood bridge and fingerboard on some, natural rosewood on others. Peghead and fingerboard bound in white. Pearl/pearloid position dots. Adjustable rosewood bridge to approximately 1975, non-adjustable thereafter. High gloss lacquer finish. Adjustable truss rod. Covered "economy" tuners. High Gloss finish.

Earliest models had a zero fret.

- GCS-6 Grand Concert. Laminated spruce top. Laminated mahogany wood back and sides. Black binding (b/w/b/w/b.) Mahogany neck. Adjustable rosewood bridge. Peghead bound in white. Rosewood fingerboard. Adjustable truss rod.
- GCS-7 Grand Concert. Laminated spruce top. Laminated mahogany back and sides. Black binding (b/w/b/w/b.) Rosewood fingerboard. Adjustable rosewood bridge. Gloss lacquer finish. White bound peghead. Adjustable truss rod.

=== Additional models approximately 1975 to 1978 ===
Some of these guitars still had the early peghead logo, instead of the "Second Generation Sigma" Martin style logo that started in approximately 1976.

- DT-22 Dreadnought. Solid spruce top. Laminated Asian chestnut sides and back with matching wood veneer on Martin style peghead. Solid spruce top. Tortoiseshell binding around back and sides. Black pickguard (later examples have tortoiseshell pickguards.) Fixed bridge, some with diamond shape inlays. Fingerboard has snowflake and diamond shape inlays. Pearl "SIGMA" block inlay between 19th and 20th fret. Later examples have gold plated, Sigma embossed Schaller-style enclosed tuners (ratio unknown.)
- DR-7S Dreadnought sunburst. Martin style peghead bound in white. Laminated spruce top. Laminated rosewood back and sides. Rosewood fixed bridge. Adjustable truss rod.
- DM-5S Dreadnought sunburst. Unbound Martin style peghead. Laminated spruce top. Laminated mahogany back and sides. Rosewood fixed bridge. Adjustable truss rod.
- GCS-4 Grand Concert. Martin style peghead. Laminated spruce top. Laminated mahogany back and sides. Rosewood fixed bridge. Adjustable truss rod. Unbound peghead and fretboard. 3-on-a-plate, open backed "economy" tuners.
- CS-4 Classical Guitar. Laminated spruce top. Laminated mahogany back and sides. Mahogany neck. Rosewood fingerboard and bridge.

Sigma produced numerous "DR-*" models from the mid-70s on through 1984: DR-8; DR-9; DR-11; DR-14; DR-15; DR-28; DR-28S; SDR-28; DR-35; DR-41; and DR-45 . The very rare DR-14 was often confused with the DR-41 but it was a different model. They have a three-piece back a la D35, and the fret markers are different as well. These models were made in Japan and imported to and guaranteed by Levin in Sweden. They cost more than the top-of-the-range DR-41 at the time. They have a paper label stating "Inspected and Guaranteed by Levin" and "Sigma Guitars" "est 1970" is inlaid on the headstock in abalone. There is a DR-14 on display in the Sigma Museum in Munich, Germany.

== Special and unusual models ==
From 1980 through 1983, prior to construction being moved to Korea, Sigma produced several models that included electronic pickups: SE-18, SE-19, SE-28, SEMC-28 (with arched back); and SE-36. These models have saddles with each string individually compensated for intonation. These models were produced in very limited quantities.

In 1980 Sigma produced the "D-10 Anniversary model" to commemorate ten years of Sigma production in Japan. Based on the DM-18, the 'D-10' has a solid spruce top with "matched" (re: laminated) mahogany sides and back, rosewood fingerboard with diamond and square position markers, mother of pearl band inlay stating "Anniversary" between the 19th and 20th fret, tortoiseshell type pickguard and binding, and close-ratio tuning machines. This limited production run lasted one year and this model remained on Sigma Dealers quarterly price lists from October 1980 until July 1981. It is not known at this time just how many D-10s were built. Given the run was for an entire production year, it is likely that thousands were built. Also refer to information regarding the D10-8 and D10-9. These were second runs with cosmetic defects sold by Martin at a discount of usually 33%.

A recently uncovered C.F. Martin memo dated August 7, 1980 (this document has not been produced for examination) further discusses 'economically uncorrectable' cosmetic flaws in the D-10 and how they were to be indicated by the inspectors: "The flawed instruments were graded into 2 categories depending on the nature of the blemishes and were stamped on the back center strip accordingly.

The D-10 '9' had cross grain sanding marks, finish runs and/or a rough finish, rough or chipped inlay and/or bindings, poor repairs, small indentations and/or discolorations.
The D-10 '8' had finish checks, shrunken end pieces, filler discolorations, dents and/or a very thin finish.
Instead of 'seconding' these by labeling them as 'Picador' guitars, and/or voiding the warranty completely, Martin decided to invoke a warranty exception and lower the price by a few points. The affixed warranty card was amended to read..."Your D-10 '9' (or D-10 '8') is not warranted against cosmetic defects."

Although the minor cosmetic issues might offer a minor aesthetic issue to some, research between 2014 & 2019 suggests that these D10 guitars were crafted to a very high standard and offer outstanding tonal qualities. The research further suggests that the D10 Anniversary guitars are extremely rare to the open market. These guitars are collectible and a piece of Martin & Sigma history."

In the years of 1981 and 1982, Martin imported partially assembled Sigma guitars from Japan and the assembly was completed in Nazareth, Pennsylvania. There were only two models, labeled "Sigma Martin USA DR-28N" and "DR-35N", 'N' for "Nazareth". A Martin factory sales brochure shows the DR-28N retailed at $600.00 and the DR-35N retailed at $650.00. The DR-35N had a three-piece laminate rosewood back and sides and a solid spruce top. The DR-28N had a two-piece back. The DR-35N had additional detail on the fretboard. The original factory brochure also states components were processed and finished on the same production line as regular Martins. The peghead logo reads "Sigma Martin USA" and inside the sound box is on the neck block "made in USA" with Martin address etc. Some consider the DR-35N to be a prototype of the inexpensive laminate Martin Shenandoah line of guitars, later to become their current HPL (High Pressure Laminate) line of laminated bodied guitars. Since these models had serial numbers ranging from 900,001 to 902,908, it appears only 2907 of these "Sigma Martin USA" guitars were ever produced in total, though there may have been others that did not make final inspection and hence were not serialed and are the only Sigma-related serial numbers publicly available from Martin at this time.
