= FUJIGEN =

Japanese musical instrument manufacturing company

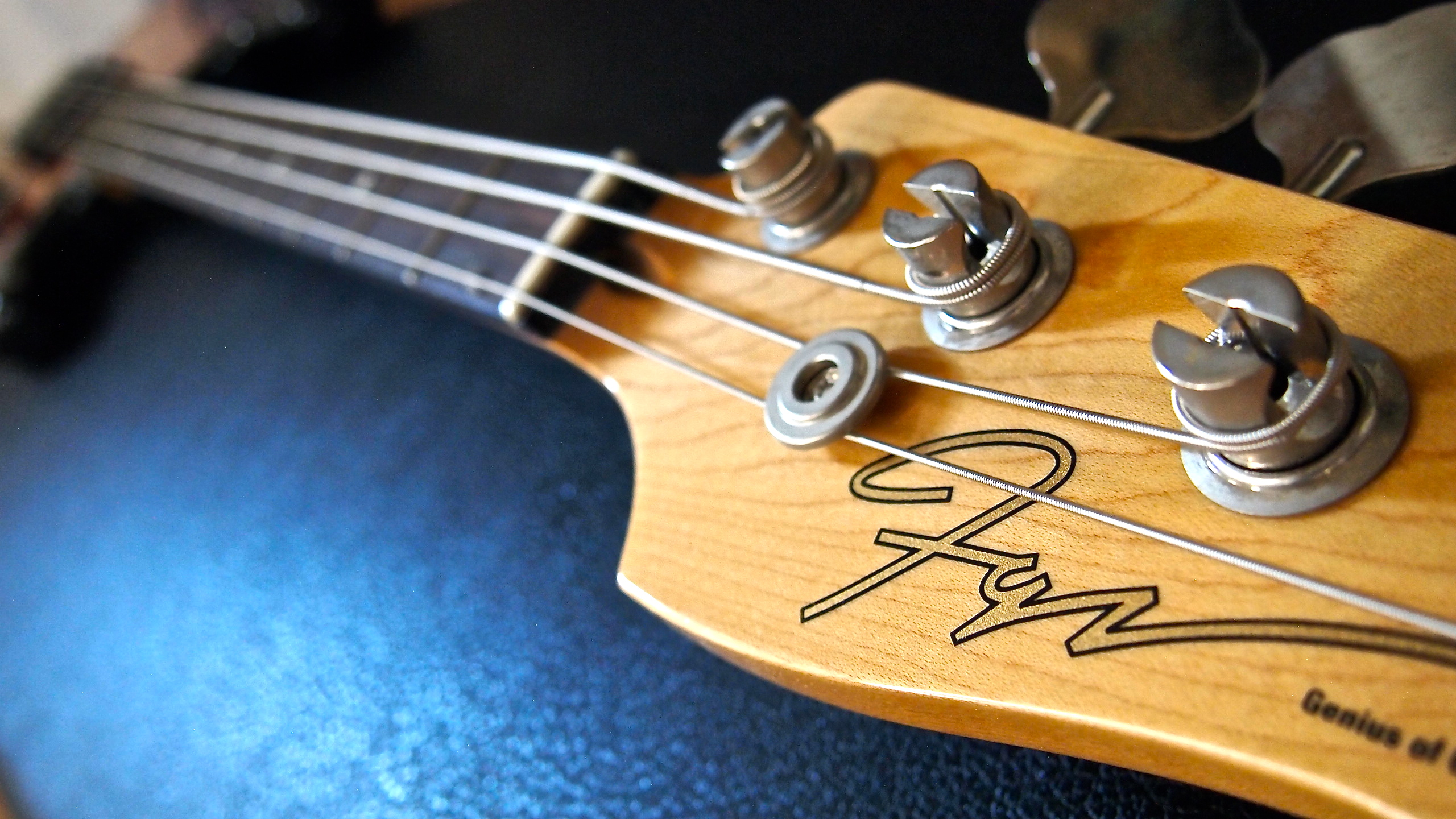
- Company type: Private
- Industry: Musical instruments
- Founded: 1960; 65 years ago in Matsumoto, Japan
- Headquarters: Matsumoto, Japan
- Area served: Worldwide
- Products: Electric guitars, basses
- Website: fujigen.co.jp

FUJIGEN (Japanese: フジゲン) is a Japanese musical instrument manufacturing company based in Matsumoto, Nagano. The company was formerly known as Fuji Gengakki Seizō (Japanese: 富士弦楽器製造, lit. 'Fuji Stringed Instrument Manufacturing'), and is named after Japan's iconic Mount Fuji. FUJIGEN does OEM guitar manufacturing for well-known guitar brands, and they manufacture their own guitars under the brand FGN.

== History ==
FUJIGEN started production in 1960 under the name Fuji Gengakki Seizō (富士弦楽器製造, lit. 'Fuji Stringed Instrument Manufacturing'), making violins and classical guitars. In 1962, Fuji started production of electric guitars. In the 1970s, Fuji started making OEM guitars for companies such as Hoshino Gakki (Ibanez), 1970's UK importers, Arbiter, Charles Summerfield Ltd (Ibanez, CSL, Cimar & Sumbro) and J.T Coppock (Antoria) Kanda Shokai (Greco guitars) and Yamaha. In 1977–78, Fuji entered a joint venture with Roland to produce guitar synthesizers. In 1981, Fuji opted out of acoustic guitar production to mainly concentrate on solid body guitar production. Fuji obtained a CNC router in mid 1981 for making guitar parts and also began to manufacture their own pickups starting in late 1981. In 1981–82, Fuji obtained the Fender Japan contract which lasted until 1996–97 and in 1983 Fuji were producing 14,000 guitars a month with 80% of the guitars being made for export markets and 20% being made for Japanese domestic markets.

In 1989, Fuji Gengakki Seizō re-branded, officially adopting the name FUJIGEN.

In mid/late 1992, FUJIGEN obtained a part of the Orville by Gibson contract which ended in 1998 and from then on have made Epiphone Japan solid body guitars, some Gretsch models and their own branded FGN guitars. FUJIGEN still manufactures OEM guitars for companies like Ibanez and Epiphone but in much smaller quantities than in the past. FUJIGEN has three factories: the Omachi factory in Omachi, the Hirooka factory (established around 1992) in Shiojiri and the Matsumoto head office factory in Matsumoto.

In the mid-2010s FUJIGEN began producing rosewood interior elements in some Mazda vehicles.

== See also ==
- List of Japanese OEM guitar manufacturers
