= Greco guitars =

Japanese guitar brand

Greco
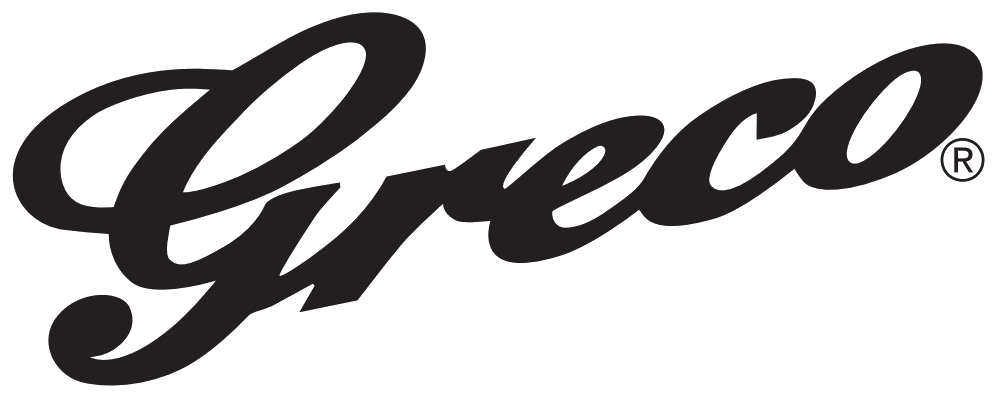
- Product type: Musical instruments
- Current owner: Kanda Shokai Corp.
- Country: Japan
- Introduced: c. 1960; 66 years ago (Note: Since the early 1990s or before, Kanda Shokai have claimed Greco (brand was) established in 1960. However, this claim has not been verified due to lack of evidences (i.e. catalogs, advertisements, trademark registration records, or in-house documents from that time). Possibly the origin of this claim might be found on their early supplier FujiGen (established in 1960; began to export electric guitars in 1963), or Teisco String Instrument, Company in Toyoshina (established in 1961, known as Matsumoto Teisco). Incidentally, another earlier supplier, Matsumoku had begun its string instrument manufacturing in the early-1960s (or possibly mid-1950s), and they supplied wood parts or finished guitars to other guitar brands including: Guyatone, Ibanez, Aria, Vox, Univox, Yamaha, and also FujiGen (probably before 1965 for FujiGen). See also: "Excerpt of histories from the Japanese guitar brands official sites". Easy Guitars (in Japanese). Archived from the original on 2013-10-05.)
- Website: greco.jp

Greco (Japanese: グレコ Gureko) is a Japanese guitar brand owned by the Kanda Shokai Corporation (in Japanese) 神田商会, a musical instrument wholesaler mostly known for being part of Fender Japan. Instruments manufactured with the name "Greco" are electric and acoustic guitars.

== History ==
Kanda Shokai was established in 1948 and the Greco brand name was started in 1960. It was not until 1966-1967 that Kanda Shokai began marketing Greco Telecaster-like models. Originally, Kanda Shokai used the Greco brand name for the solid-body models and the Canda brand name for its acoustic models, basing the latter on the company name Kanda. In the mid-late 1960s, Kanda Shokai also exported some Greco-branded guitars based on Hagström and EKO designs for Avnet/Goya in the USA. These guitars were made by the FujiGen and Matsumoku (and possibly Teisco) guitar factories and were very similar to the late 1960s Ibanez guitars based on Hagström and EKO designs. Kanda Shokai also marketed a few original designs in the late '60s including the Greco Semi-hollow "Shrike" guitars, which were imported and marketed first by Goya and later by Kustom. The "Shrike" model had a pair of unusual L-shaped pickups, with the corner of the "L" pointing towards the headstock on the neck pickup and towards the bridge on the bridge pickup; these "boomerang" pickups predate the Gibson Flying V2 boomerang-shaped pickups by over ten years.

In the early 1970s Kanda Shokai marketed Greco Gibson-like models, but with bolt-on necks rather than the set necks of genuine Gibson guitars. These were very similar to the Ibanez Gibson-like models available at that time, and most had a script Greco logo. By the mid–late 1970s most Greco Gibson-like models were being made with set necks and open-book Gibson headstock designs. Some other Greco Gibson-like models from the 1970s had a different headstock design, more like a Guild headstock design, that had a Greco logo with equally sized letters.

Starting in 1979, the Greco "Super Real Series," which made available high standard replicas of Gibson and Fender models, was introduced. Beginning in 1982, the Greco "Mint Collection" continued the high standard of the "Super Real Series." In 1982 Kanda Shokai and Yamano Gakki become part of Fender Japan, and Kanda Shokai stopped producing its own Greco Fender replica models. Since the end of the Greco open-book headstock Gibson replicas in the early 1990s, Kanda Shokai have produced various models using the Greco brand name such as the "Mirage Series" (similar to the Ibanez Iceman), various Gibson copies (not using the open-book Gibson headstock design), and Höfner-styled violin-shaped basses. The company also owns Zemaitis Guitars, now made by Tokai.

Some notable guitar players who have used Greco guitars include Ace Frehley, who used Greco Les Paul replicas when his band, Kiss, was on tour in Japan, Millie Rose Lee of Dead Witch, and Elliot Easton of The Cars. Peter Tork of The Monkees on his 1979–1981 solo tours had two of the Tobacco Sunburst Les Paul models. The Greco BM line is particularly notable as they are semi-endorsed signature models. Brian May played (or at least mimed) his BM-900 on several television appearances and in 1983 remarked:

A Japanese firm called Greco made a Brian May guitar, an exact copy. They called it a BHM 900 or something. They sent me an example. I said, "Thanks very much for sending it to me. It looks nice, but it doesn't actually sound that nice. Why don't we get together and make it sound good, too? Then you can put my name on it properly". They never replied.

== Timeline ==
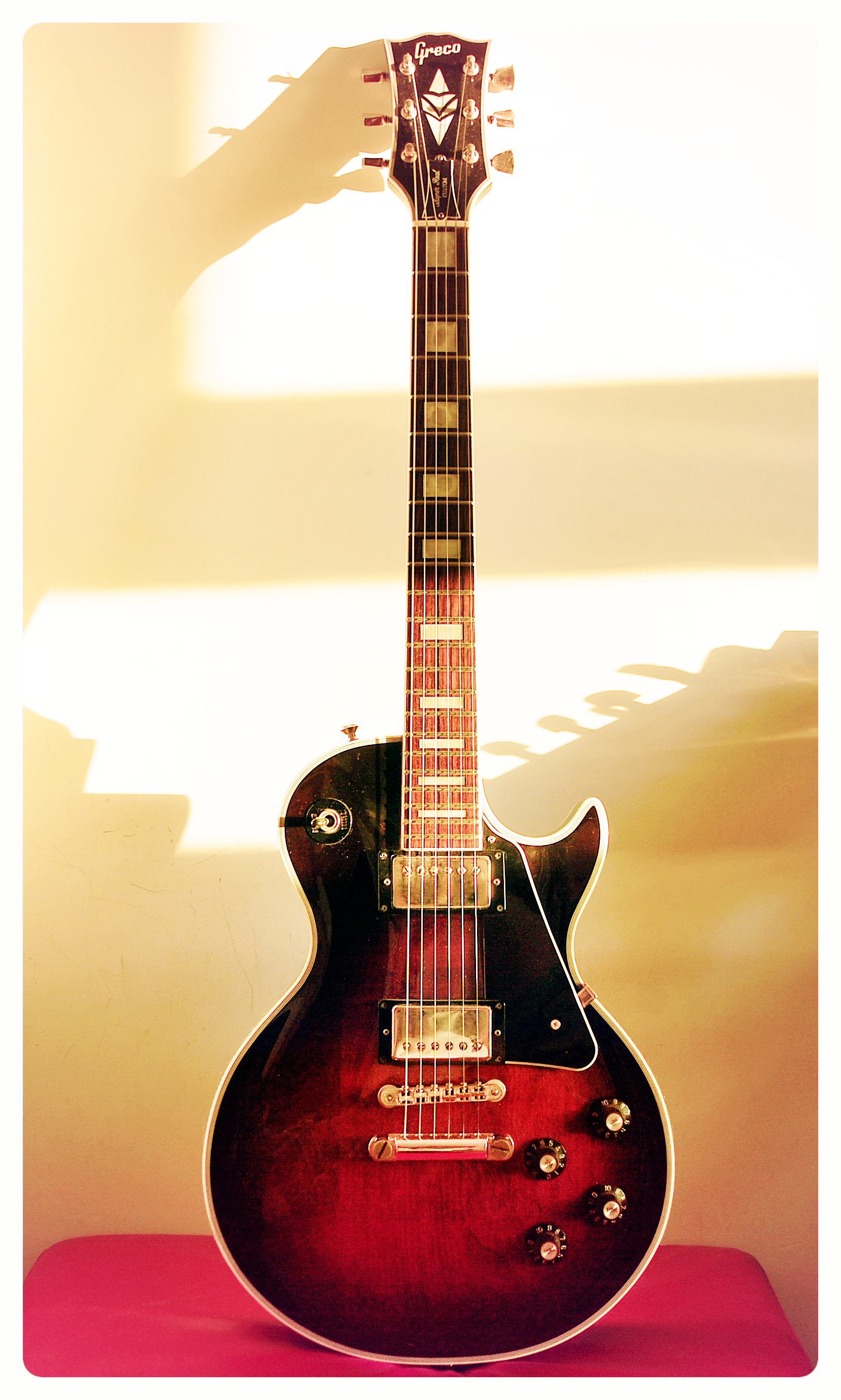
Mint Collection EGC68-50

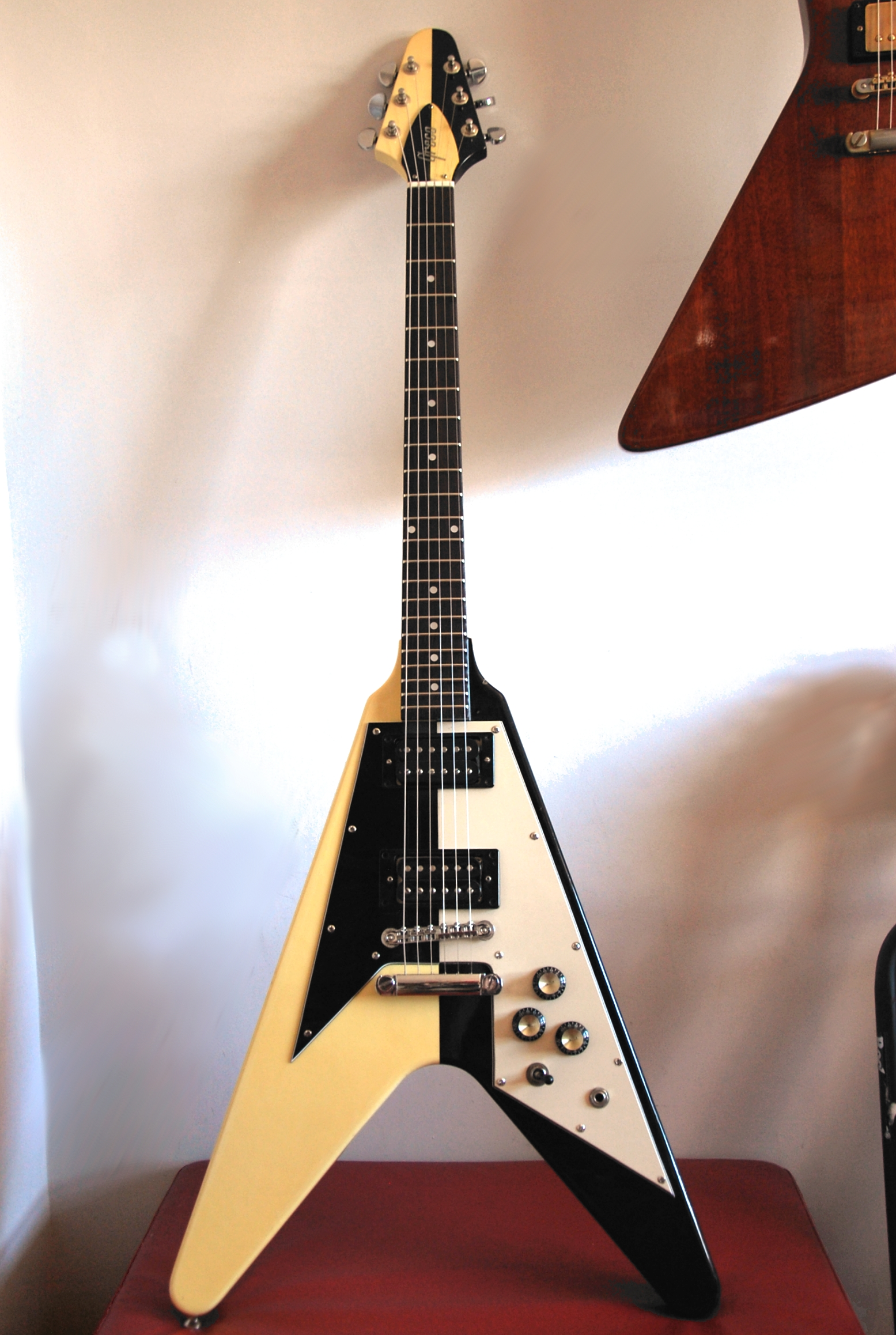
MSV650 Michael Schenker signature

1960–1961
FujiGen, an early manufacturer of Greco, was established in Matsumoto city by Yutaka Mimura and Yuichiro Yokouchi on May 4, 1960, and started to manufacture classical guitars for Kanda Shokai and Kamano Gakki. In 1961, FujiGen's production quality was dramatically improved, and they started to export guitars.

1962–1968
FujiGen began to manufacture Greco guitars for Goya Guitars, Inc. in New York City. Their early headstocks were sometimes broken during long transport. These dead stock were sold in Japan by Kanda Shokai, and it was the beginning of Greco guitars dealt by Kanda Shokai.

1965–1970
Hershman Musical Instrument/Goya Guitar Company in New York City (later Avnet/Goya, originally US distributor of Levin guitars) dealt Greco-branded acoustic guitars manufactured at European factories. Some electric guitars manufactured in Japan appeared in a Goya catalog ca. 1968.

1967
Fender Telecaster-like Greco models start.

1968
"Shrike" model with "Boomerang" shaped pickups. Distributed first by Goya and later by Kustom. (1968 to 1970)

1969
VB (Beatles Violin Bass) models start.

1970–1972
Kustom Electronics of Chanute, Kansas, bought the US distribution rights from Hershman Musical Instrument/Goya Guitar Company

1970
Gibson-like EG models start with the EG-360, with mostly set-neck styles from 1977.

1973
Fender-like SE models such as the SE-800 are produced from 1976 to 1982. The SE models end in 1982 when Kanda Shokai and Yamano Gakki become part of Fender Japan.

1976
Engraved high-quality "EXCEL" pickups appear on SE models.

1978
The Mirage (Ibanez Iceman) or "M"-series and EX Explorer (Destroyer) models start. MR and MX models start in 1979, ending 1981/1982.

1978
GO and GOB (bass) models start. They end in 1981/1982.

1979
The "Super Real Series" models starts in 1979. They end in 1982.

1979
GOII models start. They end in 1981/1982.

1980
GOIII models start. They end in 1981/1982.

1982
The "Mint Collection Series" with an "open O" (with the top part of the letter removed) Greco logo start. Most of these models end in 1990. In the early 1990s, most of the Greco guitars return to a "closed O" logo but there were some open-O guitars made in the early 1990s.

Early 1990s onwards
Various models are produced with an Ibanez-like headstock design.

== Model characteristics ==
=== Early Greco electrics ===
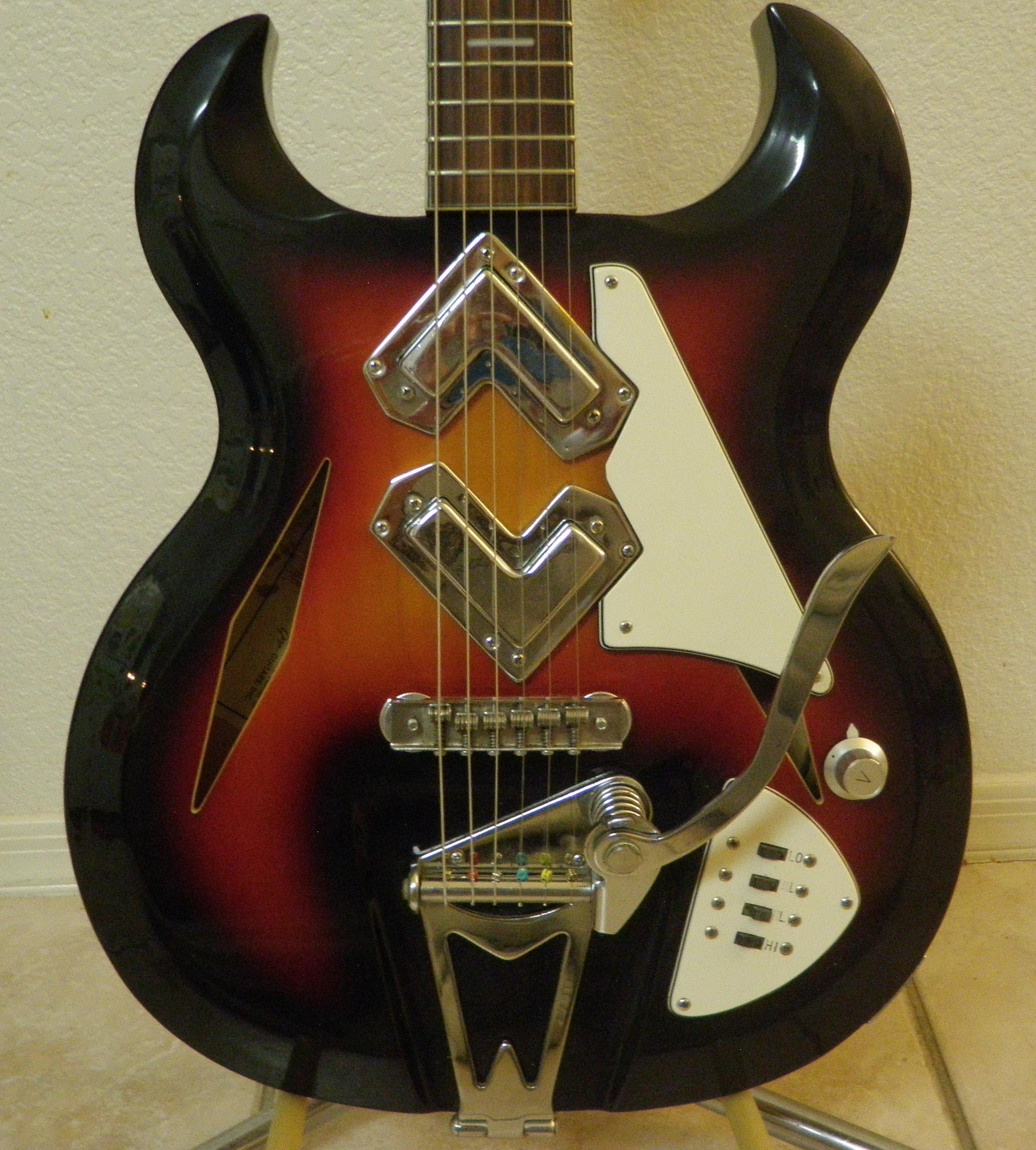
Body of 975 model (1968)

The Japanese-made Greco guitars were initially being distributed in the US through Goya and later by Kustom (known for their amps). Prior to that, Goya sold Electric guitars made by Hagstrom. Among the electric guitar models that Greco offered during this period, were two thin semi-hollow body style that were equipped with the patented “Shrike” pickups. These were the 950, and 975 models. A 12-string version for both body styles were available as well, and were labeled models 960 and 976 respectively. Those models with the Boomerang L-shaped split coil pickups were called "Shrike" models. The "Shrike" pickups were advertised as producing that distinctive "shrike" sound. The shrikes had a single volume pot and a group of slide switches to control the four split-coil pickups in the two L-shaped enclosures, letting the player switch between high and low strings on the pickups.

The 975 model and its 12-string brother, the 976 model, were the top-of-the-line imported Grecos in 1968. These were initially available only in the Shrike version, and later a more conventional two standard pickup version appeared. The models with standard pickups were not called Shrike models. Standard pickup models had the common two volume, two tone pot controls and toggle switch for the two pickups. These were regarded as attractive and well-made guitars. They had bound semi-hollow bodies and a bound neck, diamond-shaped sound holes, rectangular shaped fretboard inlays and headstock truss adjustment. The tuners were the same as the Teisco Spectrum 5 of that period, and the neck plate had the L-shaped pickup patent number stamped on it. The zero fret and thin neck is reminiscent of a Mosrite. The 975 model Shrike was considered to be of higher build quality than the many entry-level Japanese guitars that had become widely available earlier in the decade, but by 1970 the 975-style models were discontinued, a victim of the decline of the 1960s guitar boom. Soon Greco would move toward copying Fender and Gibson products, becoming a major brand in the so-called "Lawsuit" copy era, along with Tokai and the Ibanez company, which became the subject of legal action by Gibson.

=== Lawsuit "copy" era ===
The Greco Fender replicas from the late 1970s and early 1980s are similar to the early Fender Japan guitars, as Kanda Shokai owns the Greco brand and is also a part of Fender Japan. The Greco Fender replicas made by Matsumoku have Matsumoku stamped on the neckplate and the other Greco Fender replicas were made by Fuji-Gen Gakki. Most of the Greco models included the original selling price in Japanese yen (in Japanese) 円 in the model number (EGF-1800 = 180000 Yen). The "Super Real Series" date from late 1979 to 1982 and the open O Greco logo "Mint Collection Series" date from 1982 to the early 1990s. The "Mint Collection Series" have an open O letter in their Greco logo (an O letter with the top part of the O letter removed) and the "Super Real Series" usually have a closed O letter in their Greco logo.

The Fuji-Gen Gakki guitar factory was the main maker of the Greco guitars in the 1970s and 1980s. Fuji-Gen Gakki obtained a CNC router in mid-1981 for making guitar parts and also began to manufacture their own pickups starting in late 1981. The Fuji-Gen Gakki CNC router and Fuji-Gen Gakki-made pickups were used for the "Super Real" and "Mint Collection" series starting from 1981 to the early 1990s. Up until 1981/1982, Nisshin Onpa (Maxon) made pickups were used in the Greco guitars including the "Super Real Series" and the guitars were made in a more luthier style with no CNC machines used. The Cor-Tek and Tokai guitar factories were also used to make some Greco models due to FujiGen not being able to make some lower priced Grecos in the late 1980s.

There were also some transitional Greco models from 1981/1982 that have a mixture of "Super Real Series" and "Mint Collection Series" features such as a "Super Real" model with an open O letter in the Greco logo instead of a closed O letter. The Super Real EGF (flametop) and EG series higher end models featured nitrocellulose lacquer finishes and fret edge binding and some of the Super Real lower end models also featured fret edge binding.

Medium tenon neck joints with dowel reinforcements were used up until 1981 and standard Gibson style long and medium tenon neck joints were used after 1981. The medium tenon neck joints with dowel reinforcements were very similar to the Gibson long tenon neck joints that were used in the early 1970s before Gibson switched to using a short tenon neck joint. Some Greco models featured chambered (not solid) body designs up to the early 1980s, which weighed less than a regular solid body model and also had a slight semi acoustic quality. Some of the current Gibson models also use chambered bodies, such as the Gibson Les Paul Supreme.

Some Greco Les Paul guitars up until 1982 had laminated pancake bodies and were based on the similar Gibson Les Paul laminated guitars from the 1970s. The lowest priced Greco Les Pauls sometimes had different wood combinations from the regular Maple and Mahogany. Up to 1980 the lowest priced Greco Les Pauls, such as the EG450 model, had Birch bodies. The lowest priced Super Real and Super Power Les Pauls, such as the EG450 and EG480 models from late 1979 to 1982, had sycamore tops.

The EGF-1800 (flametop), EGF-1200 (flametop) and EG-1000C (custom) models from the 1980 and 1981 catalogues (as well as very early 1982 models) featured "Dry Z" pickups (PAF-like pickups made by Nisshin Onpa (Maxon)). The type of pickups varied depending on the guitars original selling price and the Nisshin Onpa (Maxon) made "Dry Z" or Fuji-Gen Gakki made "Dry 82" pickups were reserved for the top end models. The lower end models such as the EG-500 mostly used 3-piece maple tops while the higher end models mostly used 2-piece maple tops. "Mint Collection" models with a K after the numeric price designation (e.g. PC-98K) came with factory-installed Kahler tremolo (vibrato) bridges.

The "Mint Collection Series" features varied according to price, with some of the higher-end models, such as the EG58-120, model having most of the features of the "Super Real" higher-end models. Most of the "Mint Collection Series" had long-tenon neck joints, but some had medium long tenon neck joints. There were also some Greco "Super Sound", "Super Power" and "Rock Spirits" Gibson replica models made. The "Super Sound" models were mid-priced models from the "Super Real" years (1979-1982) and the "Super Power" models were lower-priced models from the "Super Real" years (1979-1982). The "Rock Spirits" models were lower-priced models from between 1979 and the early 1990s.

== Manufacturers ==
Greco guitars have been made by Matsumoku, Fuji-Gen Gakki, Dyna Gakki and others as well. Greco Gibson replicas from before circa 1975 had a Greco logo that looked like "Gneco".

Most of the Greco open-book headstock Gibson replicas were made by FujiGen Gakki. Some Greco open-book headstock Gibson replicas starting from around 1988 had no serial numbers. The lower-priced no serial number Greco Les Paul and SG models were made by Cor-Tek (Cort) and usually have Cor-Tek (Cort) potentiometers. The Cor-Tek-made Greco guitars have square-shaped, brick-like nuts with no slope and also often have shielding paint in the pickup and control cavities. Other higher priced no-serial Greco Les Paul and SG models were made by Tokai. The Les Paul models have an EG-75 or EGC-75 model number stamped in the pickup cavity and sometimes have fret edge binding.

The no-serial Greco guitars made by Tokai have square-shaped routing holes at the bottom of the pickup cavities whereas the no-serial Greco guitars made by Cor-Tek (Cort) have thinner rectangle-shaped routing holes at the bottom of the pickup cavities. Kanda Shokai stopped using the open-book headstock design on Greco Gibson replica models around the early 1990s and then concentrated on their other model lines and Fender Japan. Atlansia have supplied body and neck parts for Greco models as well. Tokai currently make the Kanda Shokai Zemaitis and Talbo models.

== Bibliography ==
- Paul Specht; Michael Wright; Jim Donahue (2005). Ibanez, The Untold Story. U.S.A.: Hoshino. ISBN 0-9764277-0-2.
- 60's Bizarre Guitars. Guitar Magazine mooks / Rittor Music mook (in Japanese). Tokyo: Rittor Music. 1993-03-01. OCLC 269873814. ID:4-69771-02, ASIN B0064YESZO. Archived from the original on 2016-03-04.
