= Tōkai Gakki =

Japanese guitar manufacturer

Tokai Gakki Company, Ltd.
- Native name: 東海楽器製造株式会社
- Romanized name: Tōkai Gakki Seizō Kabushiki-gaisha
- Company type: Private
- Industry: Musical instruments
- Founded: 1947; 79 years ago
- Founder: Tadayouki Adachi
- Headquarters: Hamamatsu, Shizuoka, Japan
- Key people: Shohei Adachi (President)
- Products: Electric and acoustic guitars, basses, autoharps
- Number of employees: 65
- Parent: Grace Company Ltd.
- Website: tokaigakki.com

Tokai Gakki Company, Ltd. (東海楽器製造株式会社, Tōkai Gakki Seizō Kabushiki-gaisha), often referred to as Tokai Guitars, is a Japanese musical instrument manufacturer situated in Hamamatsu city, Shizuoka prefecture. Tokai is one of Japan's leading companies in the business. The company was founded in 1947 by Tadayouki Adachi and remained family-owned until 2021.

Although Tokai currently focuses on electric and acoustic guitars, basses and autoharps (called "chromaharp"), the company manufactured other instruments such as melodicas, pianos and guitar amplifiers in the past.

== History ==
Tokai began in 1947, as a harmonica and piano manufacturer. It developed its first melodica, the Pianica, in 1961. Tokai began making banjos and harpsichords in 1973 and the electric piano in 1975.

Tokai started making classical guitars in 1965. It made its first electric guitar in 1968 with the Humming Bird, a guitar loosely based on the Mosrite Mark I and II. This was followed in 1970 with the Humming Bird Custom acoustic guitar (not to be confused with the Hummingbird guitar model produced by Gibson).

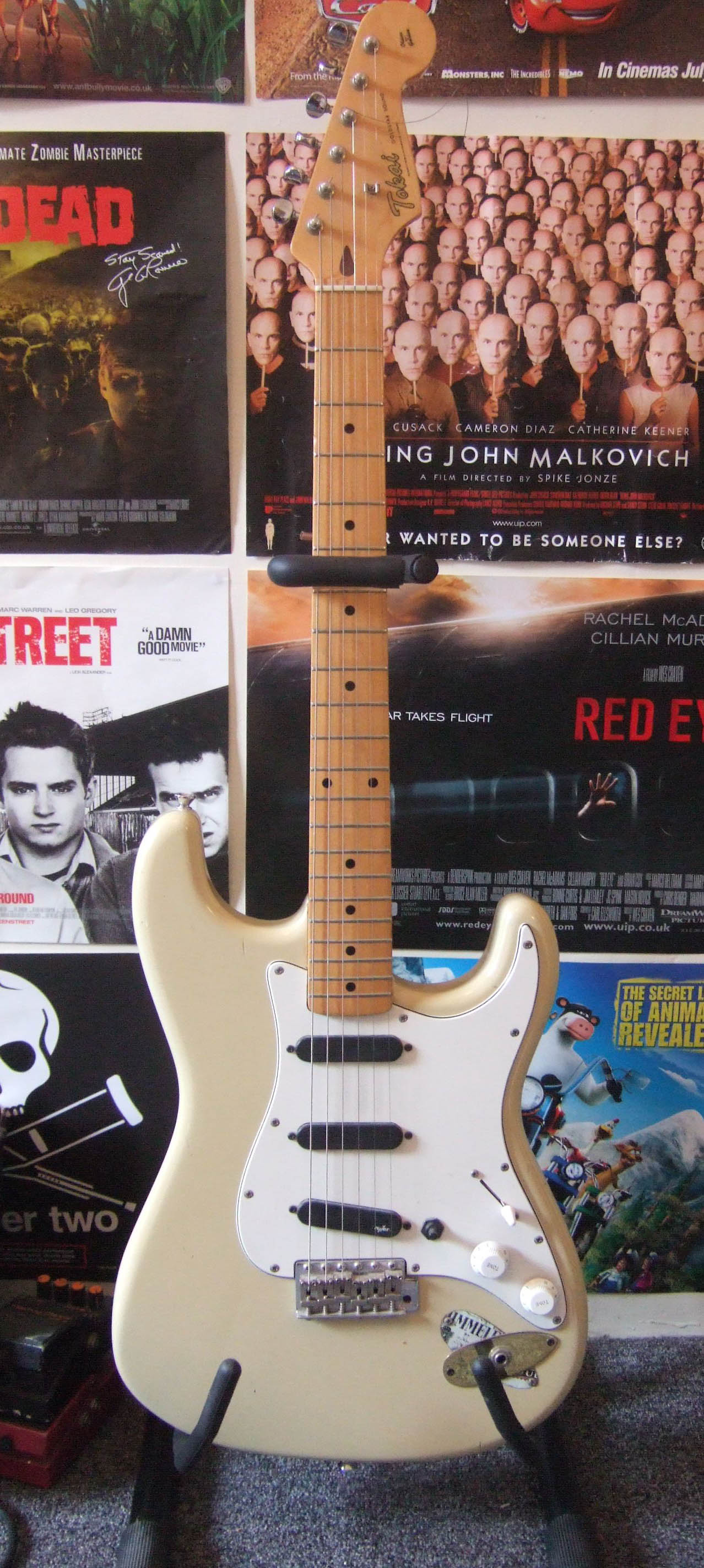
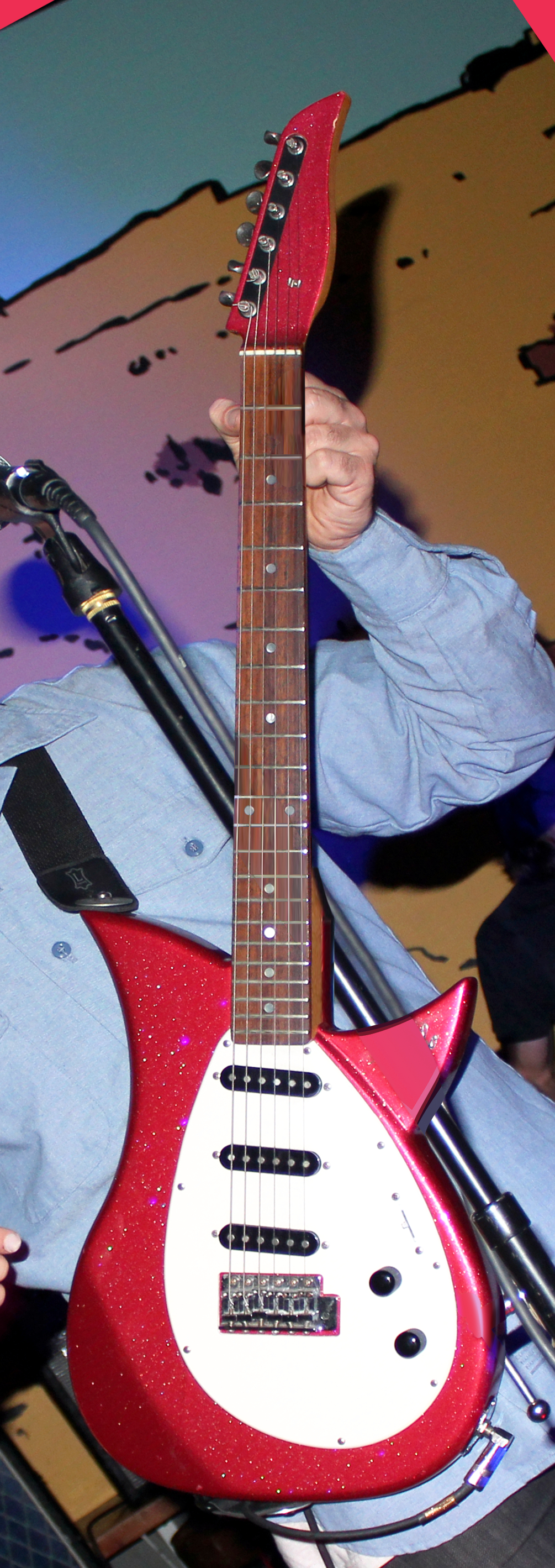
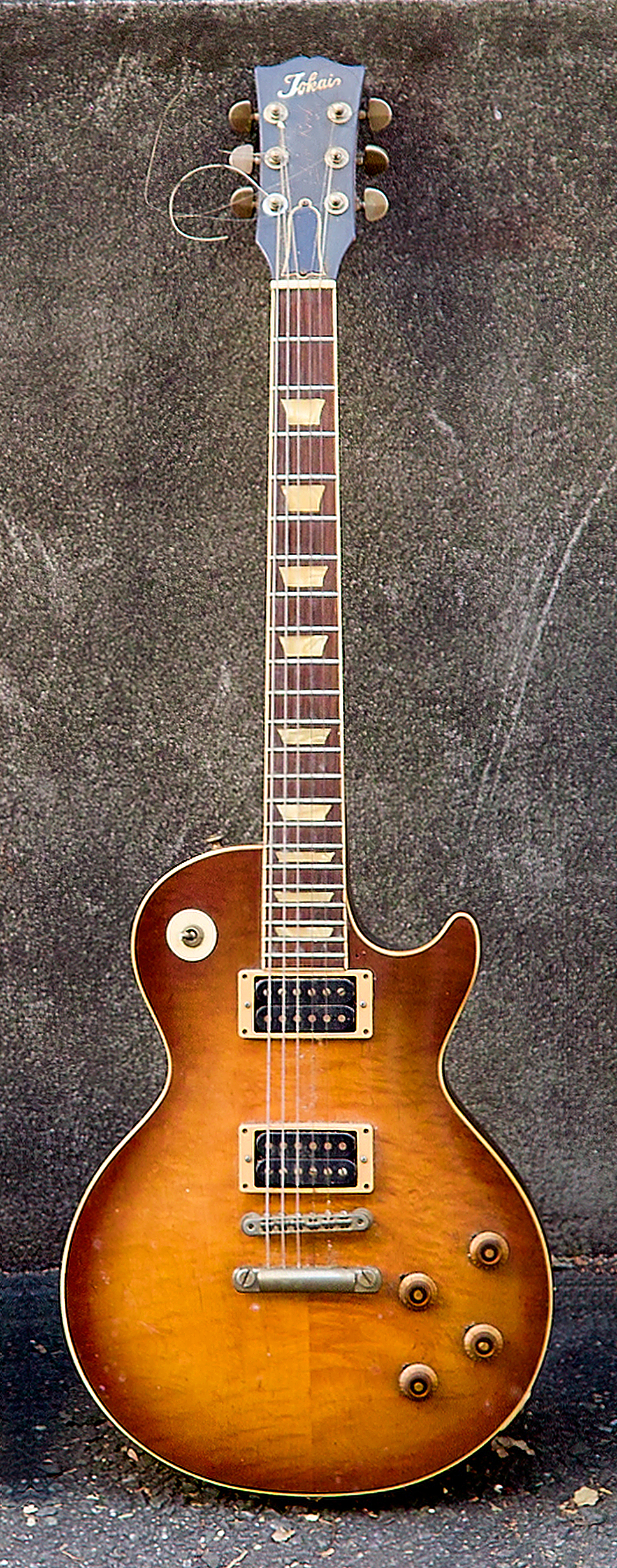
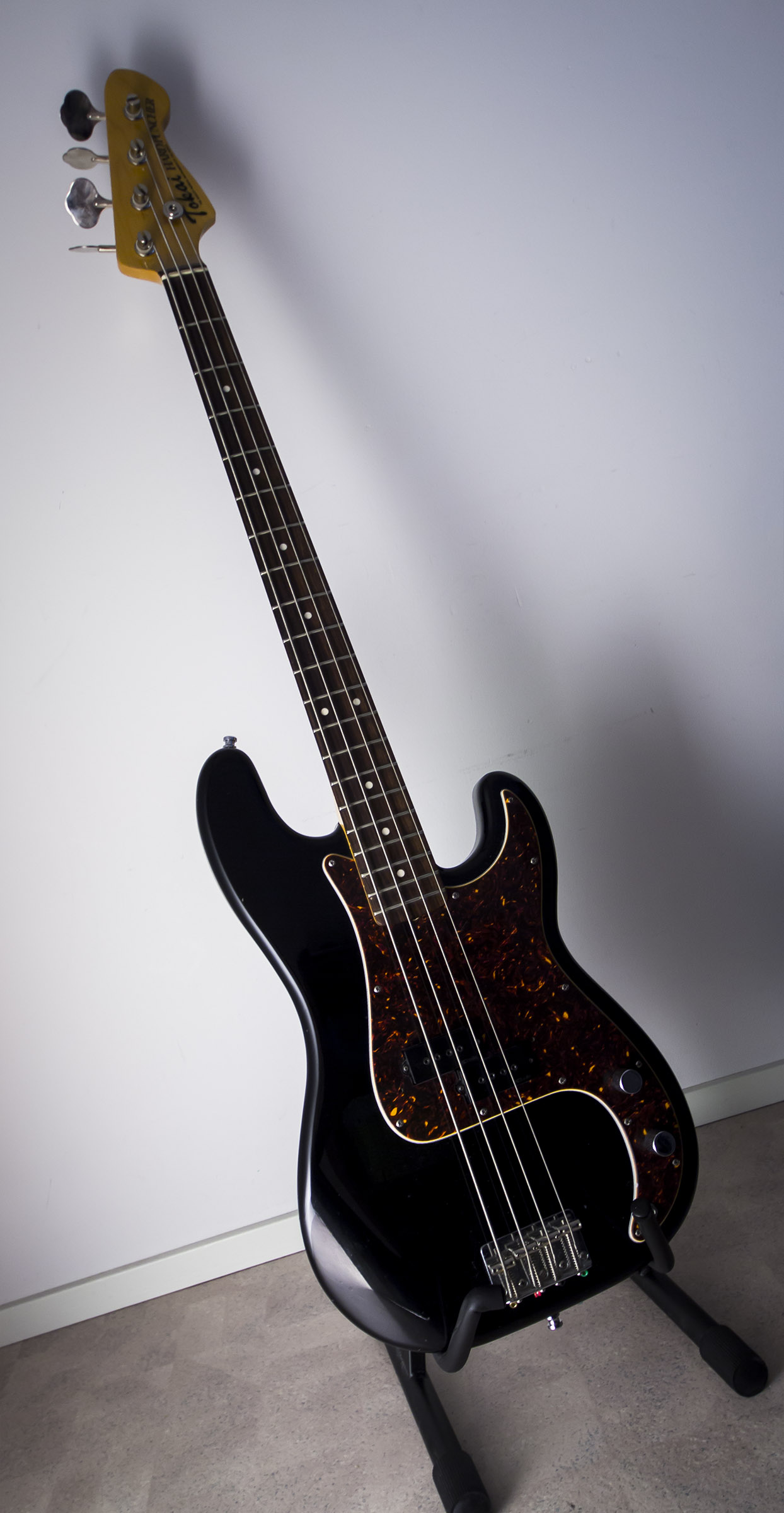
Some Tokai guitars, with models resembling American manufacturers' guitars: fltr: Goldstar Sound, Talbo, LS-85 Love Rock, Hard Puncher bass

From 1970 to 1973, Tokai produced the Conn line of acoustic guitars under contract with C.G. Conn. In 1972, Tokai entered into a joint-venture with C. F. Martin & Company to supply acoustic guitar parts and also to build Martin's Sigma electric guitars. In 1975, it launched its own Cat's Eyes line of acoustic guitars, which were replicas of C.F. Martin guitars.

Between 1977 and 1978, Tokai began making various Fender and Gibson replica electric guitars and basses. These models are generically known as "lawsuit guitars". Tokai's replica of the Gibson Les Paul electric guitar, named the "Les Paul Reborn" model, started in 1978. By 1980, the name was changed to "Reborn Old" and later to its current name, "Love Rock". The name change was in response to threats from American guitar companies to go to court to protect their copyrights. Tokai also made Fender replicas, the "Springy Sound" (ST series, Fender Stratocaster replica) and the "Breezy Sound" (TE series, Fender Telecaster replica).Both Stevie Ray Vaughan and Chuck Hammer played a "Tokai Springy Sound" at one time. This guitar was fitted with lipstick pickups and can be seen on the cover of his second studio album Couldn't Stand the Weather. By the late 1970s, replicas of Fender guitars, such as the ".38 Special" guitar and the "Hard Puncher" bass (replica of the Fender Precision Bass), began to be sold in Japan and Europe.

From 1981 until the late eighties Tokai entered the 'Super Bass' producers by the MBX (medium scale) and LBX (Long scale) basses. The MBX 45 and 50 are single-pickup basses in the style of the Fender Jazz Bass, while the MBX 70 has two pickups.

In 1982, Tokai introduced an aluminum-body guitar called the Talbo (Tokai Aluminum Body) which the band Devo played at one time. Tokai has its own instrument making factory and have built guitars for well-known brands under contract (OEM). In the mid-1990s Tokai briefly made Fender-branded guitars for sale in Japan under contract during the transition of Fender's main manufacturing contract from FUJIGEN to Dyna Gakki. This lasted only a few months, and Dyna has been Fender's sole supplier since.

Tokai Gakki was acquired by Grace Company, Ltd. in November 2021 becoming a wholly owned subsidiary. It operates under Unisound, the music instruments division of Grace Company.

== Characteristics ==
The original selling price in Japanese yen is often included in the model number—for example TLS-100 = 100,000 Japanese yen. The higher priced Tokai Gibson replicas have nitrocellulose finishes and long tenon neck joints. Tokai guitars have been made in Japan, Korea and China. Korean production started around the mid-1990s. Tokai guitars made in Korea (MIK) are lower priced guitars, similar to the Korean Epiphone guitars. The MIK (Made in Korea) guitars can be differentiated by the truss rod cover. Japanese guitars have a two-screw truss rod cover whereas the Korean guitars have a three-screw truss rod cover (although some early Korean guitars also have two-screw truss rod covers). The MIK guitars usually have a different Nashville style bridge instead of the usual ABR-1 bridge. Furthermore, MIK Gibson replica guitars usually have a neck made from maple, and the body wood is usually made from either alder, agathis or nato.
