= List of products manufactured by Fender Musical Instruments Corporation =

This is a list of notable products made by the Fender Musical Instruments Corporation.

== Continued And Discontinued Fender Guitars ==
=== Acoustic guitars ===
- Fender King, later named the Fender Kingman
- Fender Wildwood (1966–1971)

=== Electric guitars ===
Electric Guitars models in current mainstream production:

- Duo-Sonic
- Jaguar
- Jazzmaster
- Lead Series
- Mustang
- Fender Starcaster
- Stratocaster
- Telecaster
- Fender Jag-Stang
- Fender Electric XII
- Fender Katana
- Fender Meteora

==== Discontinued Electric Guitars ====
Electric guitar models no longer in mainstream production:

- Fender Bronco (Lives on through Squier as a bass guitar)
- Fender Bullet (lives on through Squier)
- Fender Coronado
- Fender Cyclone
- Fender Esquire (lives on through Squier)
- Fender HM Strat USA/Japan
- Fender Marauder
- Fender Musicmaster
- Fender Performer
- Fender Prodigy
- Fender Showmaster
- Fender Swinger
- Fender TC 90
- Fender Toronado (lives on through Squier)
- Starcaster by Fender

Electric Guitar Series (Discontinued)

- Lead Series (reissued as Player Series since 2020)

=== Steel Guitars ===
==== Lap and Console Steel Guitars ====
- Fender White Steel

==== Pedal Steel Guitars ====
- Fender 1000 double neck 8-string pedal steel

== Basses ==
=== Electric basses ===
Electric basses in mainstream production:

- Fender Bass VI
- Fender Jaguar Bass
- Fender Jazz Bass
- Fender Mustang Bass
- Fender Precision Bass
- Fender Telecaster Bass (once replaced as Squier Vintage Modified Precision Bass TB then Classic Vibe '50s Precision Bass)
- Fender Meteora Bass

==== Discontinued basses ====
Electric basses no longer in mainstream production:

- Fender Bullet Bass
- Fender Coronado Bass
- Fender Musicmaster Bass
- Fender Performer Bass
- Fender Precision Bass Lyte
- Fender Prophecy II Bass
- Fender Starcaster Bass
- Fender Zone Bass
- Fender Dimension Bass

== Software ==
- Fender Play
