= Fender Mustang Bass =

Bass guitar

Mustang Bass
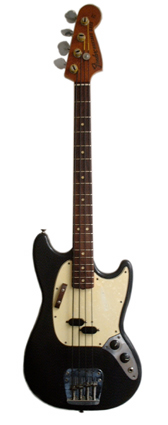
- Manufacturer: Fender
- Period: 1966–1983, 1998, 2002–present

Construction
- Body type: Solid
- Neck joint: Bolt-on
- Scale: 30"

Woods
- Body: Alder, Poplar, Ash, Basswood
- Neck: Maple, "C" Shape
- Fretboard: Maple, Rosewood, Pau ferro, Ebony, Indian laurel

Hardware
- Bridge: Strings-Thru-Body with 4 Individually Adjustable Saddles
- Pickup(s): 1 Special Design Split Single-Coil Mustang Bass Pickup (1966-present); 1 Wide Range Humbucker (2013-2016); One Precision Bass Split Single-Coil and one Jazz Bass Single-Coil (2016-present); One Mustang Bass Split Single-Coil and one Jazz Bass Single-Coil (2019-present)

Colors available
- Competition stripes, tobacco sunburst, various other colors

The Fender Mustang Bass is a shortscale electric bass guitar model produced by Fender and Squier. Two variants, the Musicmaster Bass and the Bronco Bass, have also been produced from time to time, using the same body and neck shape. Originally marketed as a student bass, the Mustang Bass is notable for its usage in alternative and indie genres.

== Design ==
The Mustang Bass utilizes the same body as the Fender Mustang, its guitar counterpart. The body design has also been used on the Musicmaster guitar and basses, Duo-Sonic guitar, Fender Bronco guitar, and Squier Bronco basses. Based on the earlier Musicmaster body, the Mustang body has a more notable offset. The Mustang Bass has a 30" scale length, with a shorter neck that typically has 19 frets. Relatively unique elements of the Mustang bass are the string-through body design, and the 7-bolt bridge. The pickguard and control plate are two separate pieces, with the control plate made of metal, similar to the Fender Jazz Bass. The control plate features a tone knob, a volume knob, and an output jack facing out of the guitar. The pickups on the Mustang bass have a split coil design similar to the Precision style pickup, but appear smaller, and have a plastic covering with no exposed pole pieces. Mustang basses originally came with the standard "Pull-bar" on the treble side of the strings of the early Fender era, though later models may not include them, or may include the bar installed as a thumb rest on the bass side of the strings.

== History ==
=== Mustang Bass ===
Introduced in 1966 as a companion to Fender's shorter-scaled, two-pickup Fender Mustang guitars, the Mustang Bass was the last original bass designed by Leo Fender before his departure from the company in 1965. Like the early Precision and Jazz basses, the Mustang Bass was originally fitted with string mutes, which were often removed by players.

The standard finishes were red, white, and blue. Fender guitars were finished in nitrocellulose lacquer up until 1968, with later finishes done in a thick polyester.

In 1969, the Mustang Bass and Mustang Guitar were issued with notable competition finishes. These finishes included "racing" stripes over the base coat, with one thick central stripe, and two thin stripes bordering it. Three competition finishes were originally offered, being competition orange (with red stripes), competition red (with white stripes), and competition "burgundy" (actually blue, with lighter blue stripes). In 1970, sunburst was added. In 1972, blue, red, and competition orange were no longer offered. By 1974, competition red and burgundy were also no longer offered, replaced by black and walnut. White was replaced by or renamed to olympic white. In 1977, the mustang Bass was offered in blond, natural, and walnut, as well as sunburst, black, and white (no longer olympic). In 1981, the sunburst was tobacco sunburst, and the only available left-handed model finish. White, black, and natural remained, while the walnut finish was replaced by antigua and wine finishes. The Mustang Bass was not listed by Fender in 1982, and stopped production from their Fullerton plant in 1983.

Discoloration in older runs of the Mustang Bass have led to "rare" alternate colors such as the "surf green", actually a yellowed competition burgundy, and the "competition burgundy" itself. Fender sells Vintera II Competition Mustangs with the competition burgundy finish as a blue finish with light blue racing stripes. The burgundy has been attributed to misprints, a short-lived burgundy sunburst around the edges of the finish, or discoloration of the competition burgundy from a blue to a burgundy.

Fender Japan reissued the Mustang Bass in 1998.

During 2013 and 2014, Fender produced the Fender Pawn Shop Mustang Bass, a series with the tagline of "guitars that never were, but should have been". They were made in Mexico, and based on the original "competition" Mustangs of the early 1970s. Available in Candy Apple Red with white stripes, Olympic White with blue stripes, and three color sunburst, their features included an alder body, C-shaped maple neck, 9.5-inch radius rosewood fingerboard with 19 medium jumbo frets, four-ply white pearloid pick-guard, two Jazz Bass control knobs (volume and tone) and string-through-body bridges with four adjustable saddles. Similar to the Squier Mikey Way Mustang Bass, the Pawn Shop Mustang basses featured a single humbucking pickup.

The Fender Offset Mustang Bass PJ was released at Summer NAMM, 2016. Unlike the typical Mustang Bass, the Mustang pickup is replaced by a Precision pickup, and a typical Jazz pickup was added in the bridge position. Initially available in olympic white, sonic blue, and torino red. A capri orange finish would be introduced in 2017. As of 2018, they were available with pau ferro fingerboards.

In 2017, Fender began offering a signature model of the Mustang Bass for Justin Meldal-Johnsen, based on his 1966 daphne blue Mustang Bass. The relic finish is also offered in black. It has lollipop hipshot tuning machines.

Fender announced the American Performer Mustang Bass in 2018, releasing in 2019 with a Mustang split coil pickup and an added Jazz pickup at the bridge, both by Yosemite. This configuration is similar to the PJ models, but features the Mustang pickup and placement rather than the Precision pickup and placement. It was released in four finishes; 3-color sunburst, aubergine, satin surf green, and arctic white. Each finish has a rosewood fingerboard.

By 2020, the Fender Player Mustang Bass PJ was being offered, with a similar configuration to the previous Offset series model. It came in sienna sunburst, aged natural, and Firemist gold finishes.

In 2023, Fender began offering the Vintera II '70s Competition Mustang Bass, based on the competition orange and competition burgundy (blue) finishes. They feature a Mustang split coil pickup.

Set to release for August 2024, the Fender Player II Mustang Bass PJ is in a similar configuration to the Player PJ, but most notably features rosewood instead of pau ferro, and a reshaped neck. It is available in aquatone blue, coral red, hialeah yellow, 3-color sunburst, and polar white.

=== Squier Mustang Bass ===
In 2011, Squier reintroduced the Mustang Bass part of the lineup. The Squier Vintage Modified Mustang Bass was released in July 2011, offered in black, or three-tone sunburst with a maple fretboard, a black pickguard and Stratocaster style volume and tone knobs. This model has since been discontinued.

From 2012 to 2015, Squier produced a signature model of the Mustang Bass for Mikey Way of My Chemical Romance, based on a custom Fender Mustang Bass he performed with from 2011. It was finished in large flake silver sparkle, based on the Duo-Sonic finish, had a black competition stripe, a black painted headstock, and a single humbucking pickup.

In 2019, Squier began offering the Classic Vibe '60s Mustang Bass. Finished in olympic white or surf green with an indian laurel fingerboard, the '60s Mustang Bass is based on the earlier Fender Mustang basses, and has Mustang pickups and Mustang style volume and tone knobs.

=== Musicmaster Bass ===
The Musicmaster Bass variant was also introduced in 1971, and was originally marketed as a student model. Rather than the split-coil design of the Mustang Bass, it featured a single-coil pickup, which was actually a six-pole Stratocaster guitar pickup under a solid plastic cover. Production ceased around the same time as the Mustang Bass in 1981, with the release of the similar Fender Bullet Bass. Squier reissued the Musicmaster Bass briefly during 1997, with a four-pole bass guitar pickup, only to be discontinued after one year of production.

=== Squier Bronco Bass ===
In 2003, the Bronco was released under the Affinity line. The Bronco Bass uses the Mustang body, and has a maple neck and fretboard. The rest of the bass is more similar to the Musicmaster Bass and the Fender Bronco guitar, with a single six-pole Stratocaster pickup under a solid plastic cover. The pickup is placed in the middle Mustang position, rather than in the bridge position of the Bronco guitars. The pickguard is a single piece, and the bridge is a string through style, rather than the Mustang's through body design. The bridge also has two saddles, each one supporting half of the strings. The Affinity Bronco basses were originally offered in black or Torino Red, both of which had white pickguards.

In 2006, Squier and Sanrio released a black Affinity Bronco featuring a Bad Badtz-Maru-shaped pickguard, a black pickup cover, and no control plate.

The Bronco Bass was moved into Squier's Bullet series at some point with the most notable change being the removal of the Affinity name from the headstock. It continued to be offered in black or Torino Red.

In 2023, Squier replaced the Bullet series with the Sonic series. The Torino Red finish was replaced by Tahitian Coral, and Olympic White was also released. Ultraviolet was released shortly after as an online Fender exclusive with a black pickguard and pickup cover. Guitar Center offered an exclusive California Blue finish, with a black pickguard and pickup cover. Clover shaped tuning machines replaced the previous Y-shaped tuning machines, and a four saddle bridge replaced the earlier two saddle bridge. The black finish also received an Indian Laurel fingerboard with pearloid inlays while the Tahitian Coral and Olympic White finishes retained the maple fingerboard with black dots. In 2024, Fender began offering lime green as a second online exclusive finish. The black finish is the only version with a laurel fingerboard.

== Notable players ==
- Chas Chandler of The Animals in the studio
- Bill Wyman of The Rolling Stones
- Justin Meldal-Johnsen of Beck
- Holger Czukay of Can
- Dan Auerbach of The Black Keys
- Joe Dart
- Mike Dirnt of Green Day
- Nicolas Godin of Air
- Colin Greenwood of Radiohead
- Josh Klinghoffer
- Tom Morello of Rage Against the Machine
- Finneas O'Connell
- Richard Hell
- John Scofield
- Mikey Way of My Chemical Romance
- Dallon Weekes of Panic! at the Disco
- Tina Weymouth of Talking Heads
- Thom Yorke of Radiohead
- Chris Murphy of Sloan
- Roger Glover of Deep Purple in studio, album Fireball
