= Squier Super-Sonic =

Electric guitar

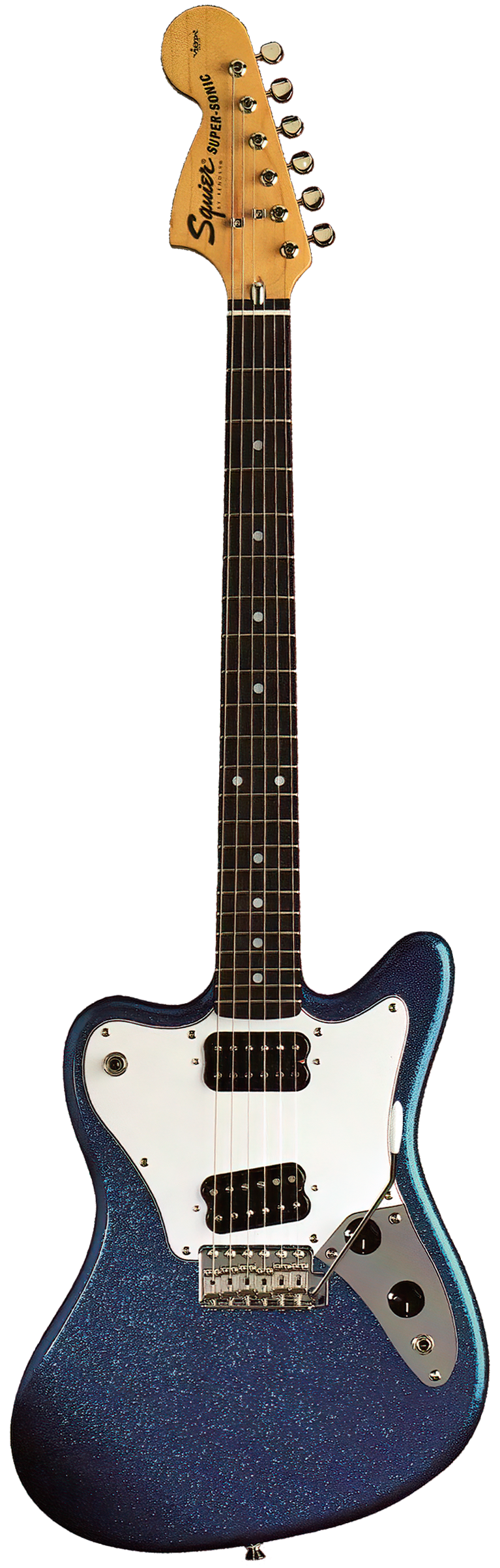
- Manufacturer: Squier, Fender
- Period: 1996—1998, 2013—2014, 2020—2023

Construction
- Body type: Solid
- Neck joint: Bolt-on
- Scale: 24 in (610 mm)

Woods
- Body: Basswood, alder, poplar
- Neck: Maple
- Fretboard: Rosewood, Indian laurel

Hardware
- Bridge: Vintage Stratocater-style vibrato
- Pickup: 2 humbuckers

Colors available
- Vista Series - Olympic White, Black, Blue Sparkle, Silver Sparkle; Pawn Shop Series - Apple Red Flake, Dark Gun Metal Flake, Sunfire Orange Flake; Paranormal Series - Blue Sparkle, Shell Pink, Graphite Metallic, Ice Blue Metallic; Made In Japan Limited - Olympic White, Black, Blue Sparkle, Silver Sparkle, 3-Color Sunburst

The Squier Super-Sonic is an electric guitar manufactured by the Fender Musical Instruments Corporation, originally marketed under their Squier brand. The design, conceived by former Squier marketing manager Joe Carducci, is said to have been inspired by a photograph in which Jimi Hendrix is pictured playing a Fender Jazzmaster upside down.

== Design ==
The Super-Sonic features an offset body similar to an upside-down Fender Jaguar or Fender Jazzmaster, but with two humbucker pickups, a three-way pickup selector toggle switch, and a traditional Stratocaster-style six-screw vibrato bridge. Unusually, the Super-Sonic has no tone control and instead has only a volume control for each pickup, wired in reverse with the control closest to the bridge controlling the bridge pickup, and the control farthest from the neck controlling the neck pickup. Like many other Fender offset designs, the Super-Sonic is a short-scale (24-inch) guitar, and also features a 22-fret bolt-on neck with a reversed CBS-style large headstock.

== Variations ==
=== Squier Vista Series (1996—1998) ===
The Super-Sonic was originally a part of the Japanese-manufactured Vista Series, and produced at the FujiGen factory between late 1996 and early 1998. The bodies were constructed from basswood and available in four different finishes; Blue Sparkle (x13), Olympic White (x05), Black (x06), Silver Sparkle (x17), with a maple neck with a rosewood fretboard. The ceramic pickups were manufactured in South Korea, with the bridge pickup canted.

=== Fender Pawn Shop Series (2013—2014) ===
Fender reintroduced the Super-Sonic in January 2013 as part of the Fender-branded Pawn Shop Series. The reissued Super-Sonic was manufactured at the Fender factory in Mexico and featured an alder body available in three new finishes (Apple Red Flake, Dark Gun Metal Flake, Sunfire Orange Flake), a C-shaped maple neck, a rosewood fretboard with a 9.5 inch radius, and medium-jumbo frets. The South Korean-made pickups on the Vista Series models were replaced with Fender Atomic humbuckers, and both canted.

=== Squier Paranormal Series (2020—2021) ===
The Super-Sonic was once again reintroduced to the Fender catalogue in June 2020 as part of the Squier Paranormal Series. The revived model was made in China at the Yako factory and featured a poplar body available initially in two different finishes (2020 Graphite Metallic, Ice Blue Metallic) with a further two finishes added in (2021 Blue Sparkle, Shell Pink), a C-shaped maple neck, an Indian laurel fretboard with a 9.5 inch radius, and narrow-tall frets. Similarly to the Pawn Shop Series version, the Paranormal Series Super-Sonic features Squier Atomic humbuckers with the bridge pickup canted.

=== Fender Made In Japan Limited (2021—2022) ===
In July 2021, Fender released a Japan-exclusive, limited run Fender-branded Super-Sonic in a Silver Sparkle finish. It was largely a faithful reproduction of the original Vista Series models, and featured a basswood body, a U-shaped neck, a rosewood fretboard with a 9.5 inch radius, medium jumbo frets, and Fender Shawbucker humbuckers. The following month, the limited line was expanded with Black, Olympic White, and Blue Sparkle finishes, while replacing the pickups with Fender Dragster BB humbuckers. In March 2022, Fender Japan released a limited run Super-Sonic with a 3 Tone Sunburst finish and an alder body.

== Notable players ==
- Alex Fischel (Spoon)
- Omar Rodríguez-López (At the Drive-In, The Mars Volta)
- Leticia Wolf/Meta Dead (The Dead Deads)
- Charley Stone (Gay Dad, Salad, Sleeper)
- Nick Reinhart (Tera Melos, Death Grips)
- Cody Weissinger (The Funeral Portrait)
- Marco Lattanzi (La Testa del Santo)
- Vincent Troia (Norcos Y Horchata)
