= Fender Bullet Bass =

The Fender Bullet Bass is an electric bass guitar model produced by Fender. It was introduced in 1982 as a part of a new line of guitars meant to replace the outgoing Mustang and Musicmaster - Fender's so called "student" guitars. The Bullet Bass had Mustang style pickups, but was available with a standard 34" neck in addition to the short scale 30" neck that the Mustang had. These instruments were only produced in the US for a couple years until Fender decided to transfer Bullet production to Japan in 1983/84. They then fell under Fender's newly active Squier branding.

Unlike the Mustang, the Fender Bullet line has not been reissued by Fender.

== See also ==
- Fender Bullet

== Literature ==
- Peter Bertges: The Fender Reference; Bomots, Saarbrücken 2007, ISBN 978-3-939316-38-1
