= Fender Zone Bass =

Fretted electric bass

The Fender Zone is a fretted electric bass guitar, introduced in 2001.

It has a slightly lighter and smaller body than previous Fender basses. The 2004 models were made of solid Mahogany and Walnut or Alder and Maple timbers and have a pair of Zone humbucking pickups powered by an 18V active 3-band preamp. Part of the best-selling Fender American Deluxe Series, the Zone Bass replaced the Japanese P-Bass Lyte Deluxe (which featured a mahogany body, an active humbucking Jazz Bass pickup in the bridge position and a single 9V powered 3-band active EQ preamp), which was gone a year earlier.

The Mexican made Fender Zone bass is essentially the same design as the Fender Precision Bass Lyte, which was manufactured in Japan, except for the addition of a set of custom-wound hum-cancelling P/J pickups and a three-band active EQ powered by a single 9V battery. The J-style bridge unit is a customized version of a pre-2004 Deluxe Active Jazz Bass pickup. On the five-string Zone, it's a Vintage Noiseless Jazz Bass pickup with solid covers. The Zone replaced the P-Bass Lyte after its discontinuation in late 2000. A five-string version of the Mexican Zone Bass was launched in 2005. Both the American and Mexican Zone basses were discontinued from the Fender pricelist at the end of 2006.
