= Fender Duo-Sonic =

Solid body electric guitar

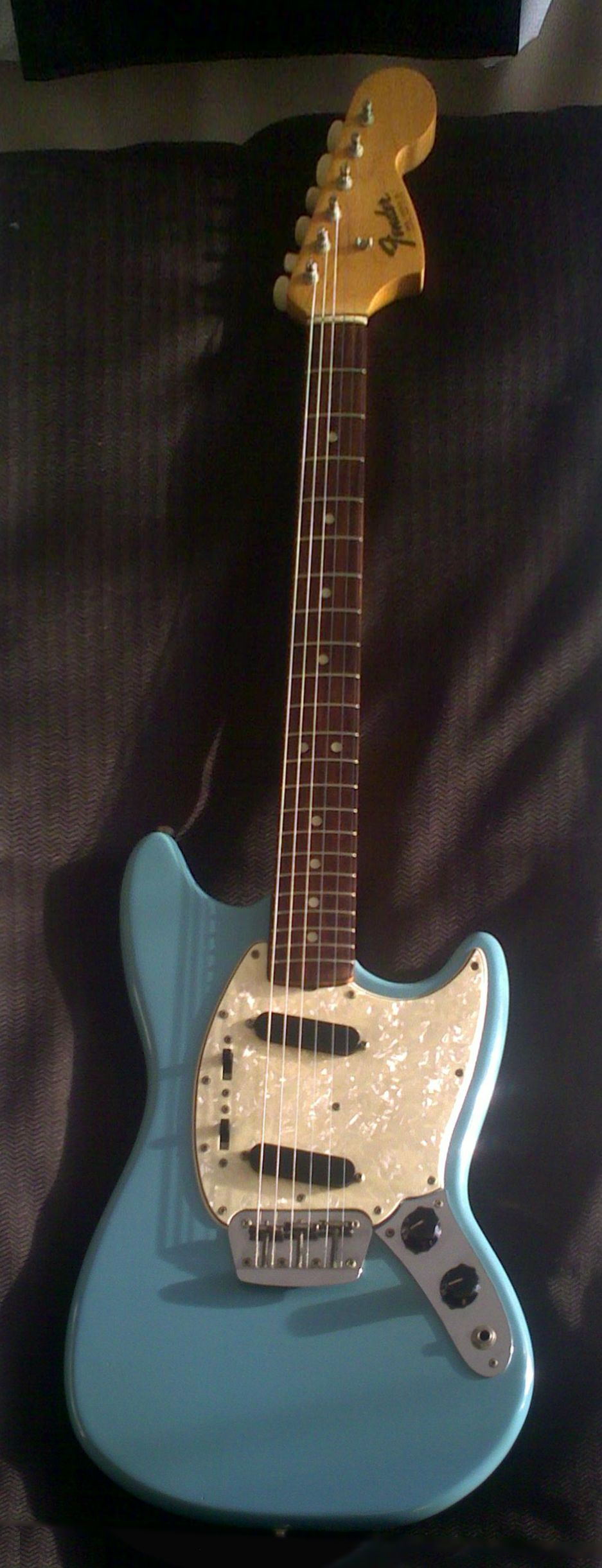
- Duo-Sonic II
- Manufacturer: Fender
- Period: 1956–1969; 1993–1999; 2008–2011; 2016–2024

Construction
- Body type: Solid
- Neck joint: Bolt-on
- Scale: 22.5" or 24"

Woods
- Body: Ash, Alder or Basswood
- Neck: Maple
- Fretboard: Maple, Rosewood or Pau Ferro

Hardware
- Bridge: fixed
- Pickup: 2 "vintage style" single coil

Colors available
- Desert Sand, Sunburst (sometimes called maroonburst), Sonic Blue, Daphne Blue, Dakota Red, Black, Torino Red, Arctic White, Capri Orange, Surf Green, and Sea foam Green

The Fender Duo-Sonic is an electric guitar launched by Fender Musical Instruments Corporation as a student model guitar, an inexpensive model aimed at amateur musicians. It was referred to as a "3/4 size" Fender guitar.

The original "Duo-Sonic" features two single-coil pickups and a vertical switch on the lower horn of the body to select bridge, neck or both pickups in a humbucking style configuration (as opposed to the blade switch more common on Fender guitars). The Duo-Sonic features typical Fender construction techniques with a bolt-on maple neck, attached to a solid body. The bridge is fixed and the line has a shorter scale neck than standard models as a concession to younger, beginner guitarists and other players with smaller hands.

== History ==
=== Original design (1956–1959) ===
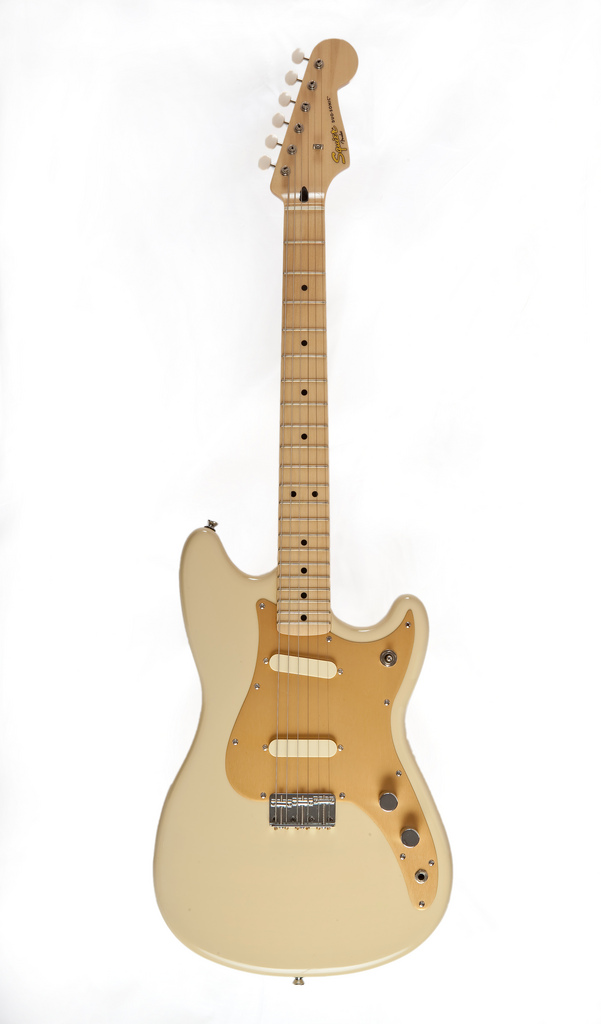
Squier classic vibe Duo-Sonic, it copies the appearance of the first generation of Fender Duo-Sonic

The Fender Duo-Sonic was introduced in 1956. Like the Musicmaster introduced a few months earlier, it featured basic but effective construction and a 22.5 inch scale length (standard Fender guitars feature a 25.5 inch scale) and cost $149.50 (equivalent to $1,770 in 2025). The original model was only available in a light tan color called Desert Sand and had a maple fingerboard with 21 frets and a neck with a soft-V profile. The original model Duo-Sonics also sport a gold-colored, anodized pickguard that helps in screening the single-coil pickups and electronics from interference.

=== Second version (1959–1964) ===
In 1959 the Duo-Sonic went through a face lift. The most significant change was a switch from a maple fingerboard to a rosewood one in keeping with changes to other Fender models at this time. These fretboards were originally in the slab-style but switched to the veneer style in late 1962. The other significant change was a switch from anodized aluminum to plastic pickguards.

=== Third version – Duo-Sonic II (1964–1968) ===
In 1964 the Duo-Sonic was redesigned based on the Fender Mustang that had recently been added to the student model line but without the vibrato tail-piece. The student guitars now all featured larger and slightly offset bodies, necks with larger headstocks and rosewood fingerboards and plastic pickguards with the volume and tone controls mounted on a separate metal plate. Pickup selection was moved above the pickups on both the Duo-Sonic and the Mustang and utilized two 3-position on-off-on switches that allowed for in and out-of-phase sounds. The pickups were also reverse-wound/reverse-polarity, which made them into a functional humbucker when both pickups were used simultaneously. Also added in this redesign was the option of a 24-inch scale neck in addition to the 22.5 inch scale. This re-designed model was renamed Duo-Sonic II although decals with and without the II designation were used occasionally. In addition to white, Daphne Blue and Dakota Red colors were added.

The Duo-Sonic lasted until 1969 when it was dropped most likely because the Mustang with its tremolo tail piece was far more popular.

The Duo-Sonic I and II are both considered rare and have displayed growing collector value. The Duo-Sonic II in particular is often seen as a desirable alternative to the more popular Mustang, since it lacks the difficult-to-maintain tremolo bridge that can be disabled with a switch.

== Reissues ==
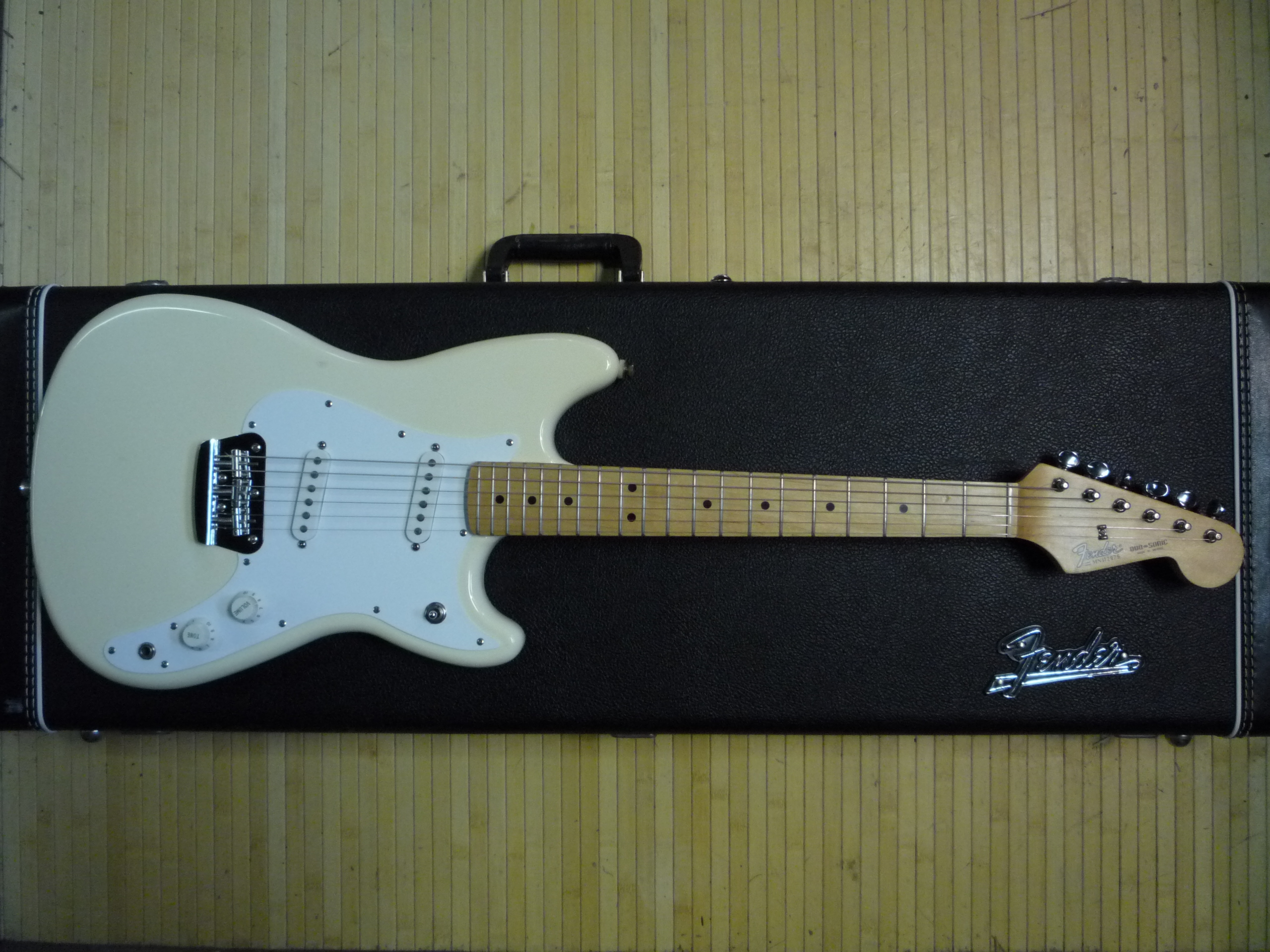
1993 re-issue Duo-Sonic, made in Mexico

In 1993 Fender released a Mexican-made reissue Duo-Sonic in a 22.7" scale. It was available in Black, Torino Red and Arctic White. It was dropped from the Fender line in 1997 but was then launched again as a Chinese made Squier Affinity model in 1998 only to be dropped in 1999.

The Duo-Sonic was re-released by Fender's Squier brand in the 'Classic Vibe' series of guitars from 2008 to 2011. It was intended to be closely modeled on the original guitar released in the 1950s and looked very similar, with a maple fretboard, gold anodized pickguard and 'Desert Sand' finish. The new model differed from the original version of the Duo-Sonic in a number of ways: basswood was used for the body, the neck differed in being C-shaped and a 24" scale length, and was fitted with more modern 'medium jumbo' frets; finally, the treble pickup was located 3/4" further from the bridge.

In 2016 Fender re-introduced the Duo-Sonic in two forms: the Duo-Sonic MN (two single coil pickups - in Arctic White, Torino Red and Capri Orange) and the Duo-Sonic HS (a single coil neck and a tappable humbucker bridge pickup - in Daphne Blue, Black and Surf Green), both equipped with a 24” scale length C-shaped neck. They have a string-through-body hardtail 'Strat' bridge, with vintage-like bent-steel saddles. These guitars, and a re-introduced 'Mustang' range, form the 'Offset Series' and are made in Mexico. The bodies are alder and the necks maple, with maple or rosewood fretboards.

== Notable Duo Sonic players ==
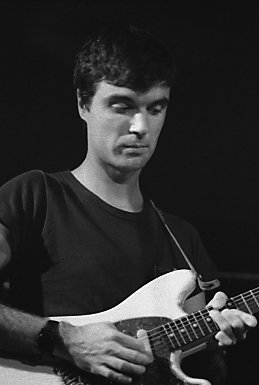
David Byrne in 1978, playing his white Duo-Sonic II onstage with Talking Heads.

- Damon Albarn of Blur, a white Duo-Sonic II
- Walter Becker – of Steely Dan
- David Cloud Berman – of Silver Jews
- Mike Bloomfield - played a Duo-Sonic with 'The Group' in 1964, at their December 7 Columbia recording session, directed by John Hammond Sr.
- David Byrne – of Talking Heads early in his career.
- Jim Campilongo - plays a 1956 Duo-Sonic from time to time with a maple fretboard, desert sand finish and gold-coloured anodized pickguard.
- Rory Gallagher – used a Duo-Sonic guitar with Musicmaster neck that was tuned up one step circa 1982.
- Martin Gore of Depeche Mode
- Jimi Hendrix – played a Duo-Sonic when he backed up The Isley Brothers in the early 1960s and was known as Jimmy James, also in the studio in the mid-1960s, and while gigging with Curtis Knight & the Squires (New York, late 1965).
- San Holo - plays a 1966 Duo-Sonic in a lot of his electronic music.
- John Lennon – of The Beatles bought a Duo-Sonic at Manny's Music in the early 70's which lived at the Dakota. Then he gave it to Clive Johns from the band Man.
- Richard Lloyd of Television
- John McLaughlin – before switching to a Gibson doubleneck in 1971.
- Liz Phair – one of her main guitars is a now-faded white '60s Duo-Sonic.
- Molly Rankin of Alvvays – used on their self titled LP and at live performances.
- Patti Smith – plays a Duo-Sonic and has featured her guitar in song lyrics, for example in "Radio Ethiopia/Abyssinia" from the Radio Ethiopia LP.
- Tom Verlaine of Television
- Joe Walsh
- Dean Ween – Michael "Mickey" Melchiondo, Jr. of Ween plays a cherry-burst '60s Musicmaster with an added Duo-Sonic pickguard and Hot Rails bridge pickup.
- Johnny Winter – used a modified Duo-Sonic during the late 1960s and early 1970s, on his first few albums.

== See also ==
- Fender Musicmaster for more history
- Fender Mustang for more history of the Duo-Sonic II
- Fender Bronco
- Fender Cyclone
