= Jazz bass =

Use of the double bass or electric bass guitar as a jazz instrument

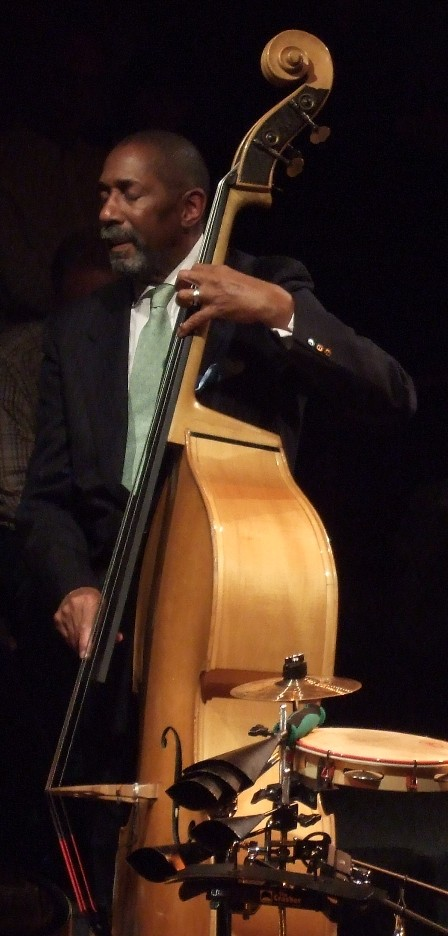
Ron Carter pictured playing with his Quartet at "Altes Pfandhaus" in Cologne

Jazz bass is the use of the double bass or electric bass guitar to improvise accompaniment ("comping") basslines and solos in a jazz or jazz fusion style. Players began using the double bass in jazz in the 1890s to supply the low-pitched walking basslines that outlined the chord progressions of the songs. From the 1920s and 1930s swing and big band era, through 1940s bebop and 1950s hard bop, to the 1960s-era free jazz movement, the double bass has been used as a rhythmic and harmonic anchor in all forms of jazz ensembles.

Beginning in the early 1950s, jazz bass players began to use the electric bass guitar to replace the double bass. The electric bass guitar, which was easier to amplify to loud volumes onstage, gained particular prominence in the late 1960s and early 1970s jazz subgenre which blended jazz with the powerfully amplified electric instruments of rock music, creating jazz fusion. Jaco Pastorius is considered to be one of the most well known exponents of jazz on the electric bass, through his work with Weather Report, Joni Mitchell, and Pat Metheny among others.

Most jazz bassists specialize in either the double bass or the bass guitar, although the ability to "double" (play both instruments) is also common. A small number of players, such as Stanley Clarke and John Patitucci, have achieved virtuosic skill on both instruments. Whether a jazz bassist is comping (accompanying) with a walking bassline, soloing, or playing on a double bass or a bass guitar, they usually aim to create a rhythmic drive and a time feel that creates a sense of swing and groove.

== Double bass ==
Beginning around 1890, the African-American communities in early New Orleans performed in jazz ensembles which played a mixture of marches, ragtime, and dixieland music. These ensembles initially consisted of a marching band with a sousaphone (or occasionally bass saxophone) supplying the bass line. As the music moved from playing for funerals on the street and into bars and brothels, the double bass gradually replaced these wind instruments. Many early bassists doubled on both the brass bass and string bass, as the instruments were then often referred to. Bassists played walking basslines—scale-based lines that outlined the harmony and provided a foundation for each song.

Because an unamplified double bass is generally the quietest instrument in a jazz band, many players of the 1920s and 1930s used the slap style, slapping and pulling the strings to make a rhythmic slap sound against the fingerboard. The slap style cuts through the sound of a band better than simply plucking the strings, and make the bass more easily heard on early sound recordings, as the recording equipment of that time did not capture low frequencies well.

Double bass players who have contributed to the evolution of jazz include the swing era player Jimmy Blanton, who played with Duke Ellington, and Oscar Pettiford, who pioneered the instrument's soloistic use in bebop. The "cool" style of jazz was influenced by players such as Scott LaFaro and Percy Heath, whose solos were more melodic in nature.

Free jazz was influenced by the composer/bassist Charles Mingus (who also contributed to hard bop) and Charlie Haden, best known for his work with Ornette Coleman. In the 1950s, some big band bandleaders began to ask their upright players to use the then-newly available Fender bass, the first widely available electric bass. In the 1970s, as jazz and rock music were blended by performers to create jazz fusion. Players such as Jaco Pastorius began to develop a unique sound using the electric bass.

Apart from jazz fusion and Latin-influenced jazz, the double bass is still widely used in jazz in the 2010s. The deep sound and woody tone of the plucked double bass is distinct from the sound of the fretted bass guitar. The bass guitar produces a different sound than the double bass, because its strings are usually stopped with the aid of metal frets. Bass guitars also usually have a solid wood body, which means that the sound is produced by electronic amplification of the vibration of the strings. The solid body upright, also known as a "stick" bass or electric upright bass (EUB) variation is still widely used by bass players in salsa and timba bands, because its sound is well suited to those styles. The EUB is smaller and lighter than a double bass, making touring and travelling easier, and its solid (or mostly solid) body enables bassists to play at a much higher volume with a bass amp without feedback.

=== Playing techniques ===
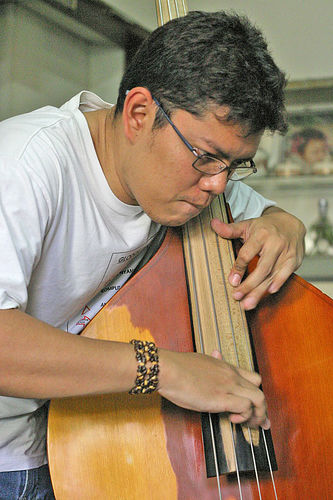
An example of pizzicato jazz bass technique.

Since the 1950s, the double bass in jazz is usually played with amplification and it is mostly played with the fingers using pizzicato style, except during some solos, where players may use the bow. The pizzicato style varies between different players and genres. Some players perform with the sides of one, two, or three fingers, especially for walking basslines and slow tempo ballads, because this is purported to create a stronger and more solid tone. Some players use their more nimble fingertips to play fast-moving solo passages or to pluck lightly for quiet tunes.

Using amplification gives the player more control over the tone of the instrument, because amplifiers have equalization controls that can accentuate certain frequencies (often the bass frequencies) while de-accentuating some frequencies (often the high frequencies, so that there is less finger noise). While jazz double bass players use amplification, they typically use much smaller, lower-powered bass amplifiers and smaller speaker cabinets than those used by an electric bass player playing jazz fusion.

An unamplified acoustic bass' tone is limited by the frequency responsiveness of the instrument's hollow body, which means that the very low pitches may not be as loud as the higher pitches. With an amplifier and equalization devices, a bass player can boost the low frequencies, evening out the frequency response. An amplifier can also increase the sustain of the instrument, which is particularly useful for accompaniment during ballads and for melodic solos with long held notes. Like other acoustic instruments used with amplification, such as the jazz violin, a double bass is often plugged into a preamplifier, impedance-matching device, and/or a direct injection (DI box) box before it is routed to the PA system, electronic effects, or the bass instrument amplifier.

In traditional jazz and swing it is sometimes played in the slap style. This is a vigorous version of pizzicato where the strings are "slapped" against the fingerboard between the main notes of the bass line, producing a snare drum-like percussive sound. The main notes are either played normally or by pulling the string away from the fingerboard and releasing it so that it bounces off the fingerboard, producing a distinctive percussive attack in addition to the expected pitch. Notable slap style bass players, whose use of the technique was often highly syncopated and virtuosic, sometimes interpolate two, or even three more slaps in between notes of their bass line.

=== Variants ===
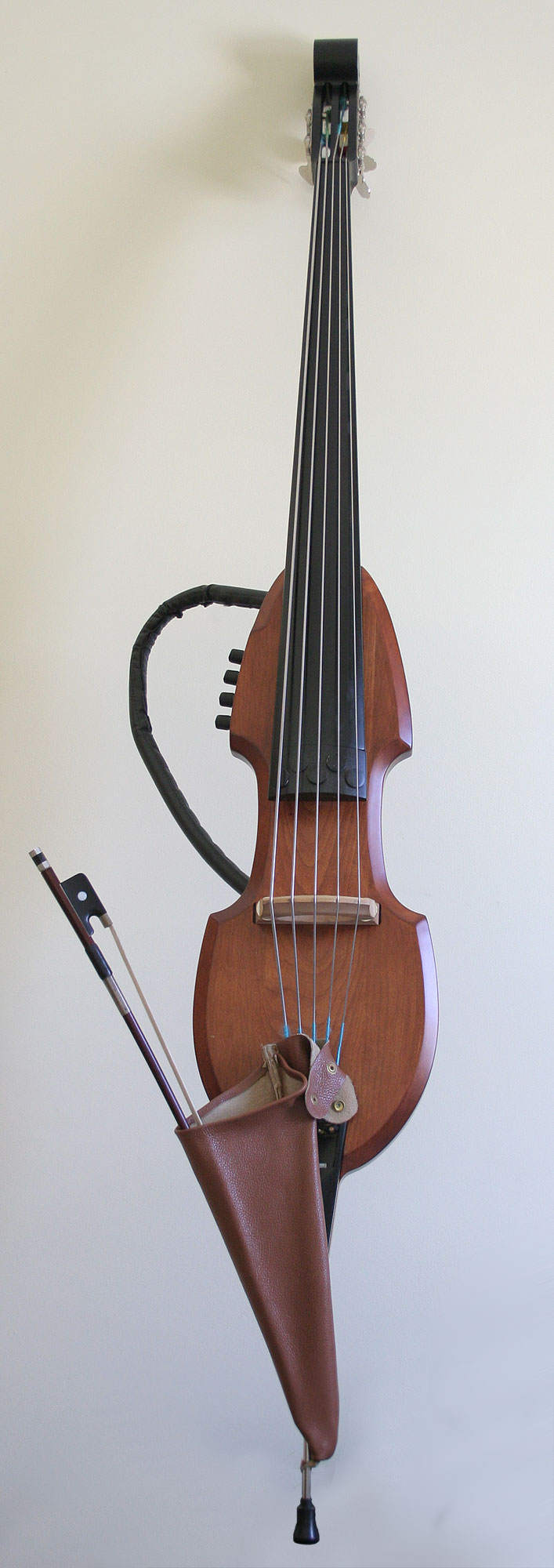
A five-string Electric Upright Bass ("EUB")

In both jazz and jazz fusion bands, some jazz bassists use a modified type of double bass called the electric upright bass (abbreviated EUB and sometimes also called stick bass). It is an electronically amplified version of the double bass that has a minimal or 'skeleton' body, which greatly reduces the size and weight of the instrument. While the EUB retains some of the tonal characteristics of the double bass, its electrically amplified nature also gives it its own unique sound. The scale length of EUBs varies: some scales are 42", similar to most double basses, whilst other models have scale lengths of only 30" like a short scale bass guitar. The shorter scale can make it easier for bass guitarists to convert to the EUB. The EUB is also widely used in salsa.

Solid bodied EUBs produce very little sound without electronic amplification. Hollow-bodied EUBs produce a quiet tone that is loud enough for individual practice. However, since hollow-bodied EUBs do not have a large resonant cavity like a double bass, they cannot reproduce the lowest notes of the instrument without an amplifier. To amplify the EUB, the string vibrations are sensed with a pickup. Early EUBs used magnetic pickups similar to those in electric guitars, or percussive magnetic diaghram pickups. Many modern EUBs use piezoelectric pickups located in the bridge or a combination of pickup types. The signal from the pickup is usually preamplified and equalized with a preamplifier and then sent to a bass amplifier or a PA system. For silent practice an EUB can also be connected to headphones.

Preamplifiers and equalizers for acoustic instruments or double basses can also be used to "roll off" the treble frequencies. Since the EUB typically does not have a hollow sound chamber, or only includes a small sound chamber, the EUB is less prone to audio feedback than the double bass when amplified. To use a bow with an EUB, both the bridge and fingerboard must be radiussed (given a curve).

== Electric bass ==
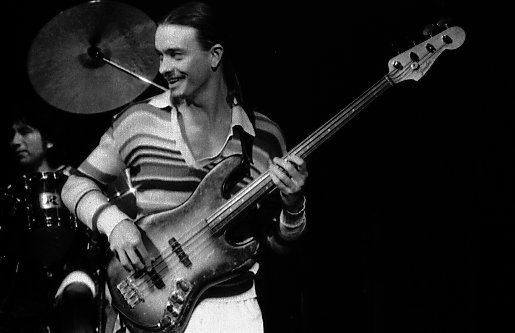
Jaco Pastorius, performing with Weather Report in Convocation Hall, Toronto, Canada November 27, 1977

The electric bass was introduced to jazz in the early 1950s when Roy Johnson, and later Monk Montgomery, first used the instrument in Lionel Hampton's big band.

The electric bass player can play all of the same types of bass lines played by its upright bass cousin. However, due to the design of the electric bass as a guitar-family instrument, it is possible to play rapid bass lines that would be impossible on an upright bass.

In a fusion band, electric bass players have to provide a strong rhythmic foundation for the band while a drummer, electric guitarist (amplified through a guitar amp) and synthesizer or electric piano player performing (amplified through a keyboard amp) play simultaneously.

In a jazz setting, the electric bass tends to have a much more expansive solo role than in most popular styles. In most rock settings, the bass guitarist may only have a few short bass breaks or brief solos during a concert. During a jazz concert, a jazz bassist may have a number of lengthy improvised solos. Well known jazz electric bass players include Jaco Pastorius, Victor Wooten, and Marcus Miller.

=== Fretted and fretless bass guitars ===
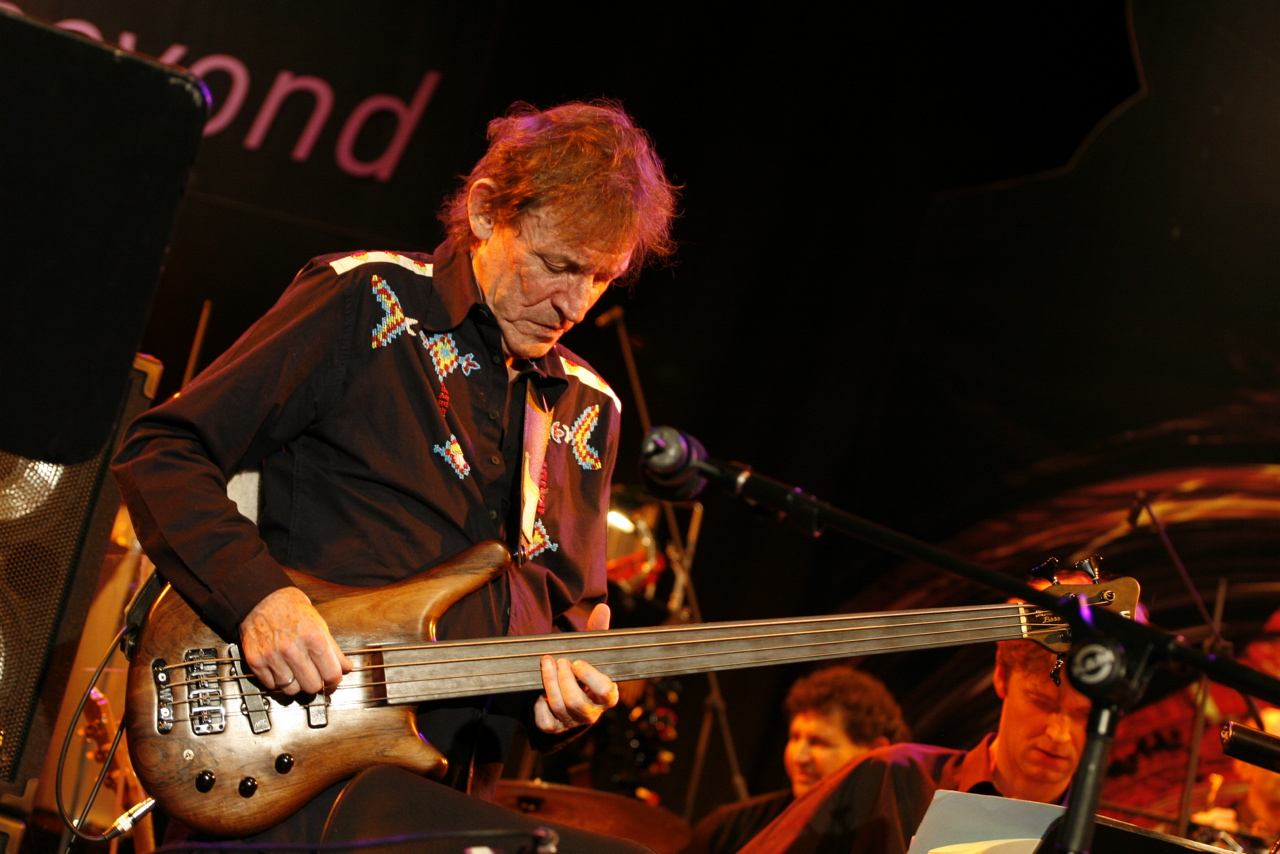
Jack Bruce playing a fretless Warwick Thumb bass guitar at the Jazzfestival Frankfurt, Germany 28 October 2006

One of the options for bass guitarists is whether to use an instrument with frets on the fingerboard or not. On a fretted bass, metal frets divide the fingerboard into semitone divisions (as on a guitar). The original Fender basses had 20 frets, but modern basses may have 24 or more. Fretless basses have a distinct sound, because the absence of frets means that the string must be pressed down directly onto the wood of the fingerboard as with the double bass. The string buzzes against the wood and is somewhat muted because the sounding portion of the string is in direct contact with the flesh of the player's finger. The fretless bass allows players to use the expressive devices of glissando, vibrato and microtonal intonations such as quarter tones and just intonation.

In a small combo, the bass player may alone determine which type of bass to use and for which tunes. In a band with a bandleader, the leader may provide guidance on what tunes are best suited to each type of bass. Some bassists use both fretted and fretless basses in performances, according to the style of repertoire they are performing. While fretless basses are often associated with jazz and jazz fusion, many other genres use fretless basses as well, such as metal bassist Steve Di Giorgio.

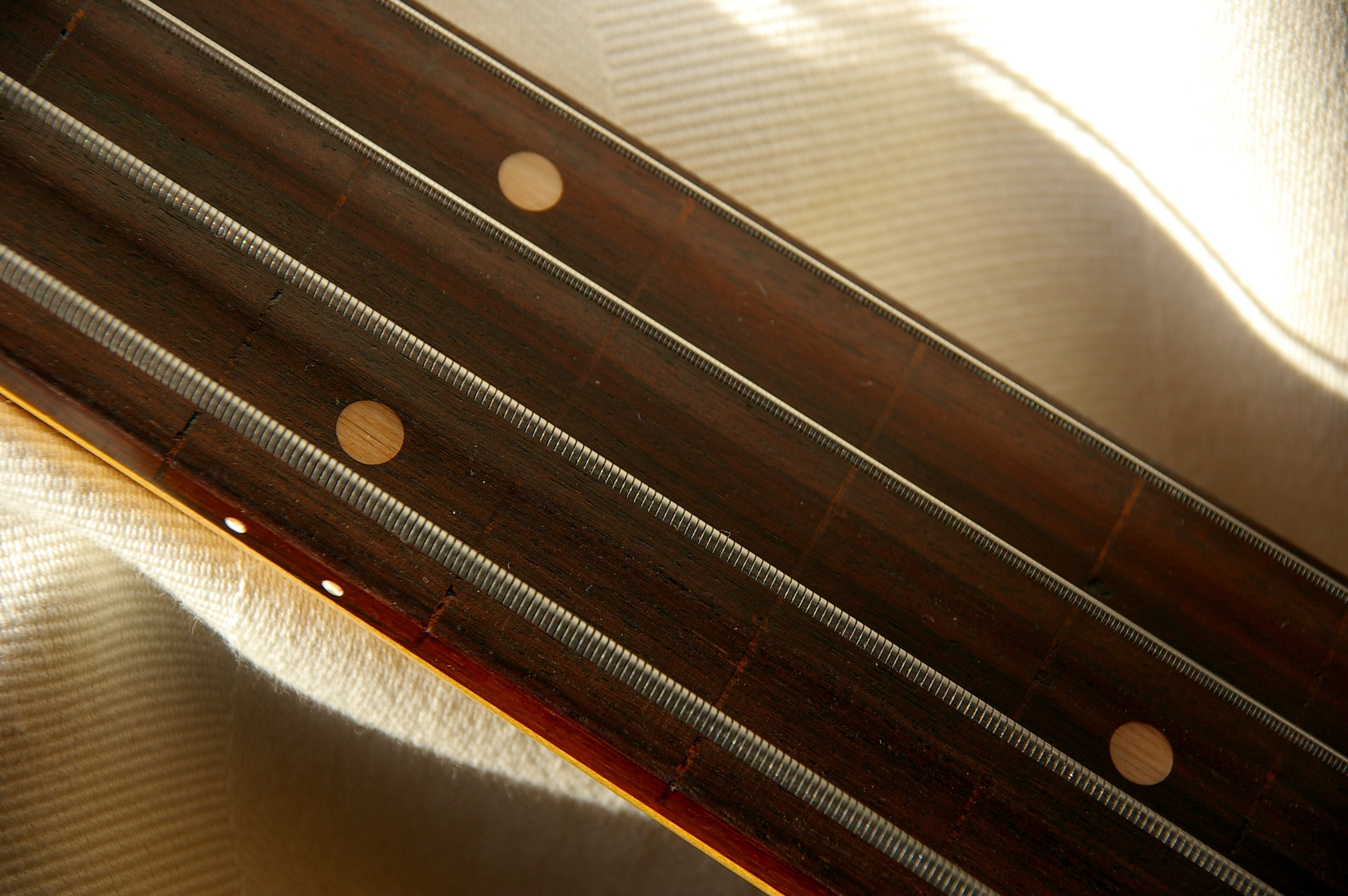
Fretless bass guitars are often used by jazz fusion bass guitar players; this fretless bass has flatwound strings; note the markers inlaid into the side of the fingerboard, to aid the performer in finding the correct pitch.

Bill Wyman takes credit for creating the first fretless bass guitar in 1961 when he converted an inexpensive Japanese fretted bass guitar by removing the frets. The first production fretless bass was the Ampeg AUB-1 introduced in 1966, and Fender introduced a fretless Precision Bass in 1970. In the early 1970s, fusion-jazz bassist Jaco Pastorius created his own fretless bass guitar by removing the frets (Note: In interviews, Pastorius gave various versions of how he accomplished this; the versions mention the use of pliers, a putty knife. In at least one interview (Guitar Player magazine, 1984) he states that he bought the instrument with the frets already removed, badly, with the slots where the frets once were not yet filled in.) from a Fender Jazz Bass, filling the holes with wood putty, and coating the fretboard with epoxy resin.

Pastorius used epoxy rather than varnish to obtain a glass-like finish suitable for the use of roundwound strings, which are otherwise much harder on the wood of the fingerboard. Some fretless basses have "fret line" markers inlaid in the fingerboard as a guide, while others only use guide marks on the side of the neck. Tapewound (double bass type) and flatwound strings are sometimes used with the fretless bass so that the metal string windings do not wear down the fingerboard. Some fretless basses have epoxy-coated fingerboards to increase durability, enhance sustain, and give a brighter tone. Though most fretless basses have four strings, five-string and six-string fretless basses are also available. Fretless basses with more than six strings are also available as "boutique" or custom-made instruments.

== Alternative instruments ==
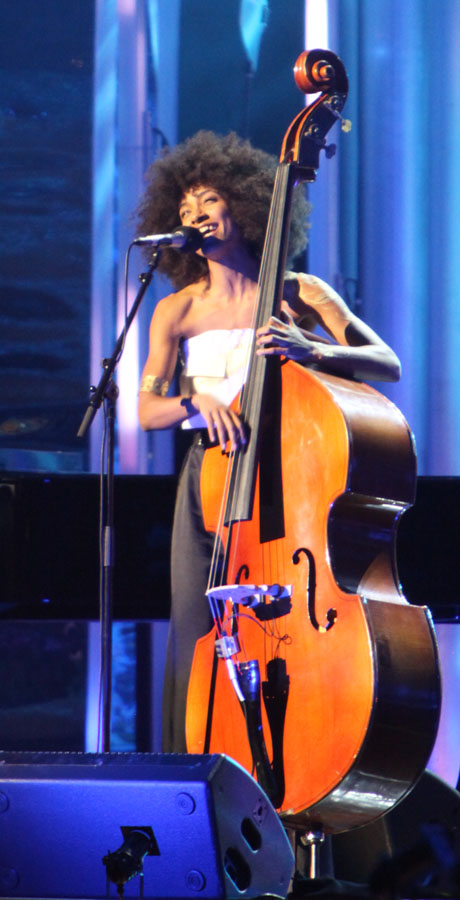
Bassist-composer Esperanza Spalding performing on December 10, 2009, at the Nobel Peace Prize Concert.

While the majority of jazz and jazz fusion recordings and live performances use either the double bass (or a related instrument such as an electric upright bass) or the electric bass to supply the low pitched harmonic foundation, there are some exceptions. In jazz organ trios, a Hammond organ player performs the basslines using the bass pedalboard or their lower manual, along with a drummer and a saxophonist. In some jazz fusion groups, the basslines may be played by a keyboard player on a bass synthesizer or other keyboard. As well, in some duos and other small groups, the basslines may be provided by a piano player; in a duo consisting of a jazz pianist and a jazz singer, the piano player plays a bassline with the left hand and chords in the right hand underneath the singer's voice. Similarly, in some duos or trios, a jazz guitarist may play basslines, a role that is especially feasible if the guitarist has a seven-string guitar with a low "B" string. In traditional dixieland or New Orleans-style jazz groups, the basslines may be played by a tuba or other low brass instrument.

== See also ==
- Swing (jazz performance style)
- List of bassists
- List of jazz bassists

== Works cited ==
- Roberts, Jim (May 1, 2001). How the Fender Bass Changed the World. Foreword by Marcus Miller. Backbeat Books. ISBN 0879306300. LCCN 2001025381 – via Internet Archive.
