= Fender Swinger =

1969 electric guitar model

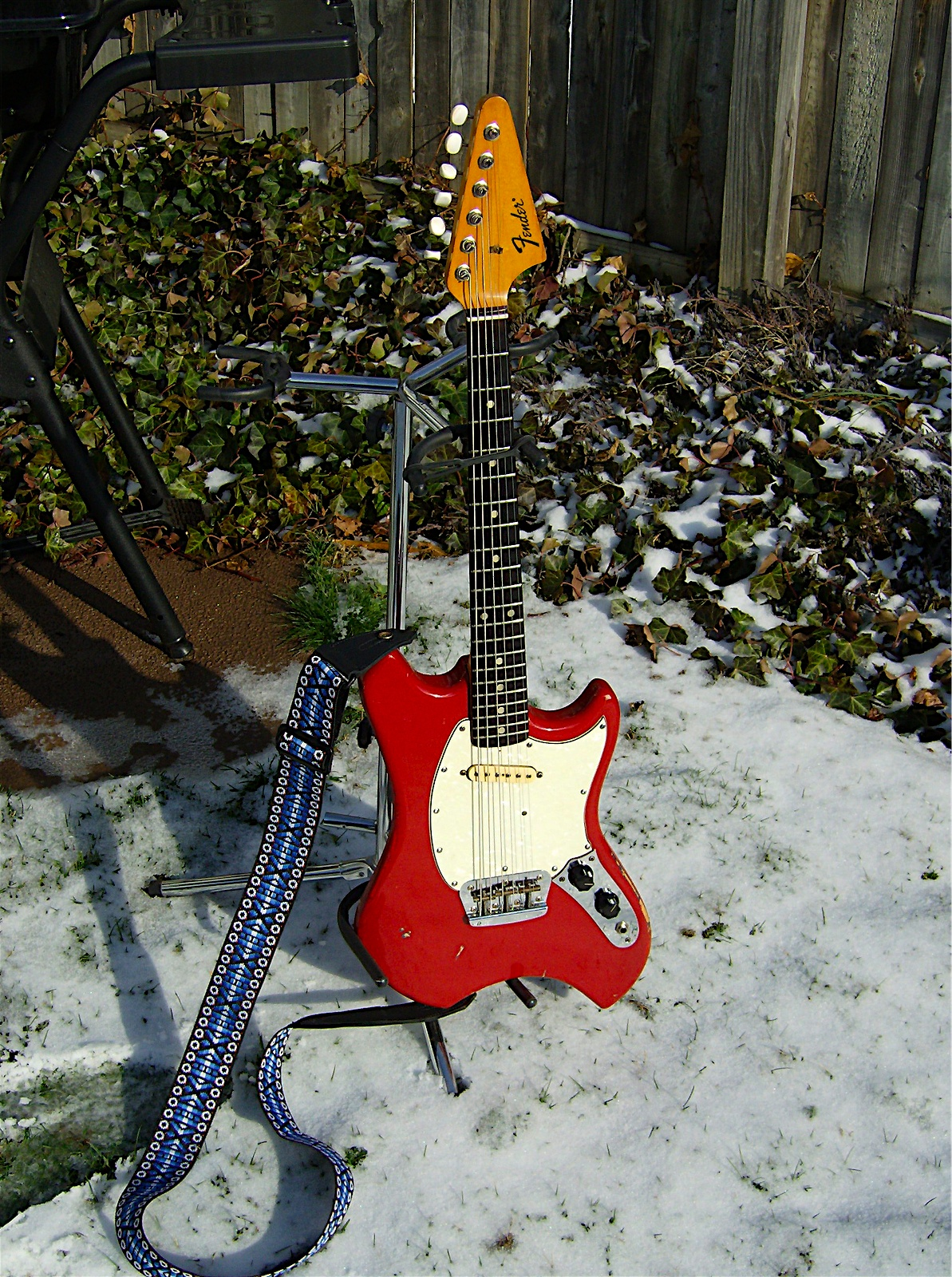
- Manufacturer: Fender
- Period: 1969

Construction
- Body type: Solid
- Neck joint: Bolt-on
- Scale: 22.5 in (572 mm)

Woods
- Neck: Maple
- Fretboard: Rosewood

Hardware
- Bridge: Fixed (non-tremolo), 3-saddle adjustable
- Pickup(s): 1 or 2 single-coil pickups with 3-way selector (2019 reissue), offset variant (reverse polarity)

Colors available
- Dakota Red, Black, Candy Apple Red, Olympic White, Sonic Blue, Lake Placid Blue, Burgundy Mist Metallic

The Fender Swinger (also known as the Fender Musiclander and Fender Arrow – as the "Swinger" emblem is usually missing from the headstock) was an electric guitar model released by Fender in 1969 and reissued by Fender Japan in 2019 as a limited edition run in single and dual pickup versions. Estimates of the model's total production number range from 250 to 600 made. The Swinger was an attempt by CBS (which had bought the company in 1965) to extract cash from inventory by combining unused bodies from the Duo-Sonic II and the failed Fender Bass V with parts from the Fender Musicmaster. The routing beneath the pickguard differs between instruments made from a Duo-Sonic II or Bass V. Bodies made from the Duo-Sonic II have no comfort cuts and a shorter bottom horn. Like the Fender Custom (a.k.a. Fender Maverick), the model was an effort to liquidate excess parts and inventory. The Swinger was marketed as another cheaper, short-scale 'student' guitar, but never seriously promoted, with resulting low popularity.

== Development and design ==
The Swinger and its cousin, the Custom, were both developed under the supervision of Virgilio 'Babe' Simoni, without the help or even involvement of Fender's R&D Department. Simoni had begun work at Fender in 1953 at the age of 16. He had risen to Product Manager by the mid 1960s, and was both skilled and well-liked within the company. The Swinger used excess parts from the Fender Bass V and Fender Musicmaster, with the Bass V pickup routing hidden under the pickguard. Between 300 and 600 Swingers were produced. The model never appeared in any Fender promotional literature.

== Dating ==
As the Swinger was built using parts that were surplus, the individual components may be older than the guitar. For example, the neck may be date-stamped 1966. All Swingers were assembled in 1969. Records of Swinger production and sales are poor and it is unclear exactly how many were produced or which parts were used on each instrument.

== Users ==
Tina Weymouth of Talking Heads used a Swinger in live performances, as seen in the concert movie Stop Making Sense. Ben Kweller used a Swinger to record most of his self-titled album and has used it in concert. Lydia Night of The Regrettes uses a Swinger live and in the band's Seashore music video. Zac Pennington used a modified version of the guitar on tours with his project Parenthetical Girls.
