= Fender Bronco =

Electric guitar

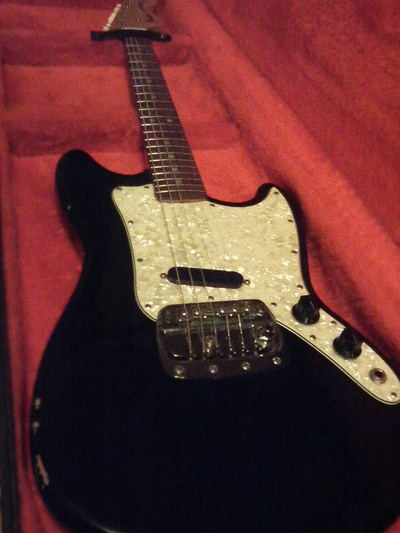
- Manufacturer: Fender
- Period: 1967–1981

Construction
- Body type: Mustang
- Neck joint: 4 bolt, bolt on

Woods
- Body: 7 piece alder
- Neck: Maple
- Fretboard: Rosewood 7.25 radius

Hardware
- Bridge: Fender steel vibrato tailpiece, chrome
- Pickup(s): One, Fender single coil offset variant

The Fender Bronco was an electric guitar model produced by the Fender company from mid 1967 until 1981. It used the body and neck from the Fender Mustang, but had only one pickup and a different tremolo arm mechanism. Unlike the other Mustang variants which had 22.5" scales, the Bronco was offered only with a 24" scale length and a maple neck featuring a "round-lam" rosewood fingerboard with 22 frets and pearl dot inlays.

The Fender Bronco was introduced to the market as a student guitar. It had been worked on since 1964 and then produced in mid-1967. It was originally supposed to replace the Musicmaster. It was initially sold as a "package" with the Fender Bronco Amp, a small amplifier also created for students.

Its single pickup was mounted in the bridge position, unlike the Musicmaster which had a neck pickup only and the Mustang and Duo-Sonic, which both had two pickups. The unique tremolo arm was Leo Fender's fourth and least popular design, and appeared only on the Bronco. It is sometimes unofficially known as the Fender steel vibrato, and colloquially as the Bronco trem.

The Bronco was usually produced with a rosewood fingerboard and standard fiesta Red finish, but later in the series Fender introduced black finish. The Bronco, like the Musicmaster and the Mustang, was discontinued in 1981 and replaced by the Fender Lead Series. The last colors available were Dakota Red, Black, Olympic White and Midnight Wine. Unlike its older and more popular cousin, the Mustang, it has not seen a re-issue, with the result that the Bronco trem is the only one of Fender's four tremolo arm designs not in current production. The Bronco name is continued only in the Squier-branded Bronco Bass.

== See also ==
- Fender Mustang
- Fender Duo-Sonic
- Fender Musicmaster
