= Fender Bullet =

Electric guitar made for students by Fender

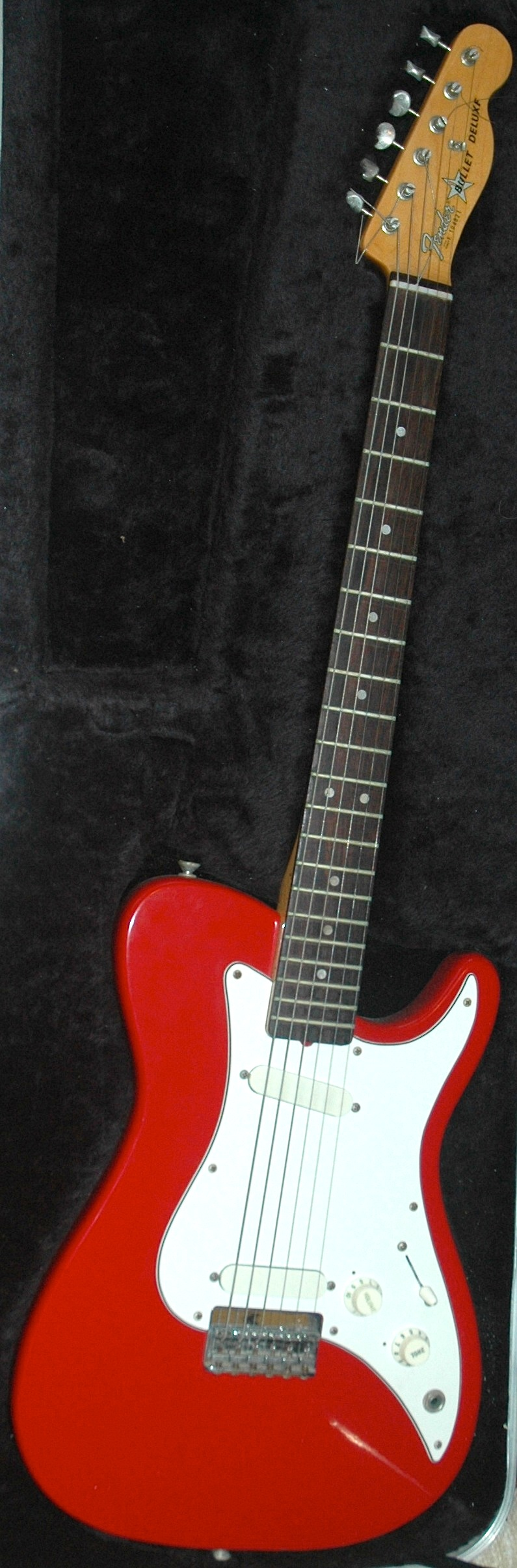
- 1981 USA Series 1 Fender Bullet Deluxe
- Manufacturer: Fender
- Period: 1981–1982

Construction
- Body type: Solid
- Neck joint: Bolt-on
- Scale: 25.5"

Woods
- Neck: Maple
- Fretboard: Rosewood or Maple

Hardware
- Pickup(s): One humbucker, two humbuckers, two single coils, or three single coils

Colors available
- Red/White, Cream/White, Red/Black

The Fender Bullet was an electric guitar originally designed by John Page and manufactured and marketed by the Fender Musical Instruments Corporation. It was first introduced as a line of "student" guitars to replace the outgoing Mustang and Musicmaster models.

== History ==
Fender initially marketed two models, the "Bullet" and the "Bullet Deluxe," both manufactured in the United States. These models had a single cutaway body style similar to that of the Fender Telecaster, but were much smaller—closer in size to the Mustang and Duo-Sonic that the Bullet replaced. They had a 21-fret rosewood neck, Telecaster-style headstock, and Kluson Deluxe tuners. The Bullet Deluxe had a plastic pickguard with a separate, traditional hardtail bridge while the standard model featured a steel pickguard-bridge-tailpiece combo. Both models had two single coil pickups with a three-way selector switch.

In 1982, Fender introduced a revised version of the Bullet, including two bass models. This series featured a double cutaway body similar but much smaller than the Fender Stratocaster without body contouring and therefore almost the same shape as the Mustang and Duo-Sonic that the Bullet replaced. The S-2 was notably featured in the music video for Twisted Sister's "We're Not Gonna Take It," used by the son of Mark Metcalf's character to blow him out of the window when the song begins. Fender ceased production of Bullet guitars at the end of 1983, and the model was never produced again in the USA. Production of the Bullet range moved to Japan, under the Squier name, and then Korea. Squier introduced a new, Chinese-made Bullet Strat in 2005.

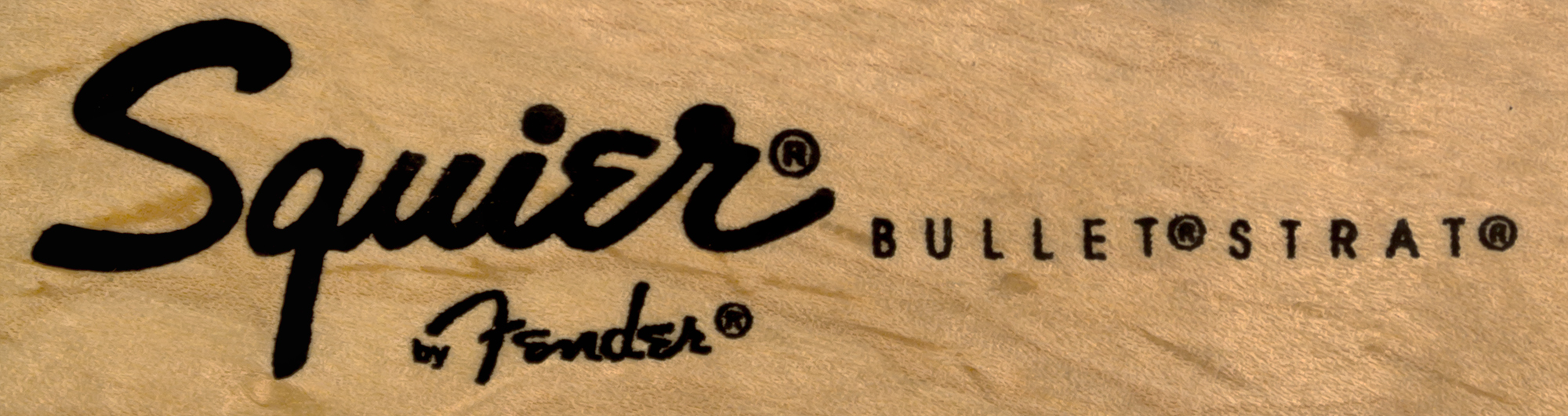
Stamp that appears on the guitar's headstock.

By 2015, Fender was using the Squier Bullet name as a line of their lowest-priced guitars.

Fender also markets guitar strings under the Bullet brand.
