= Fender Musicmaster =

Solid body electric guitar

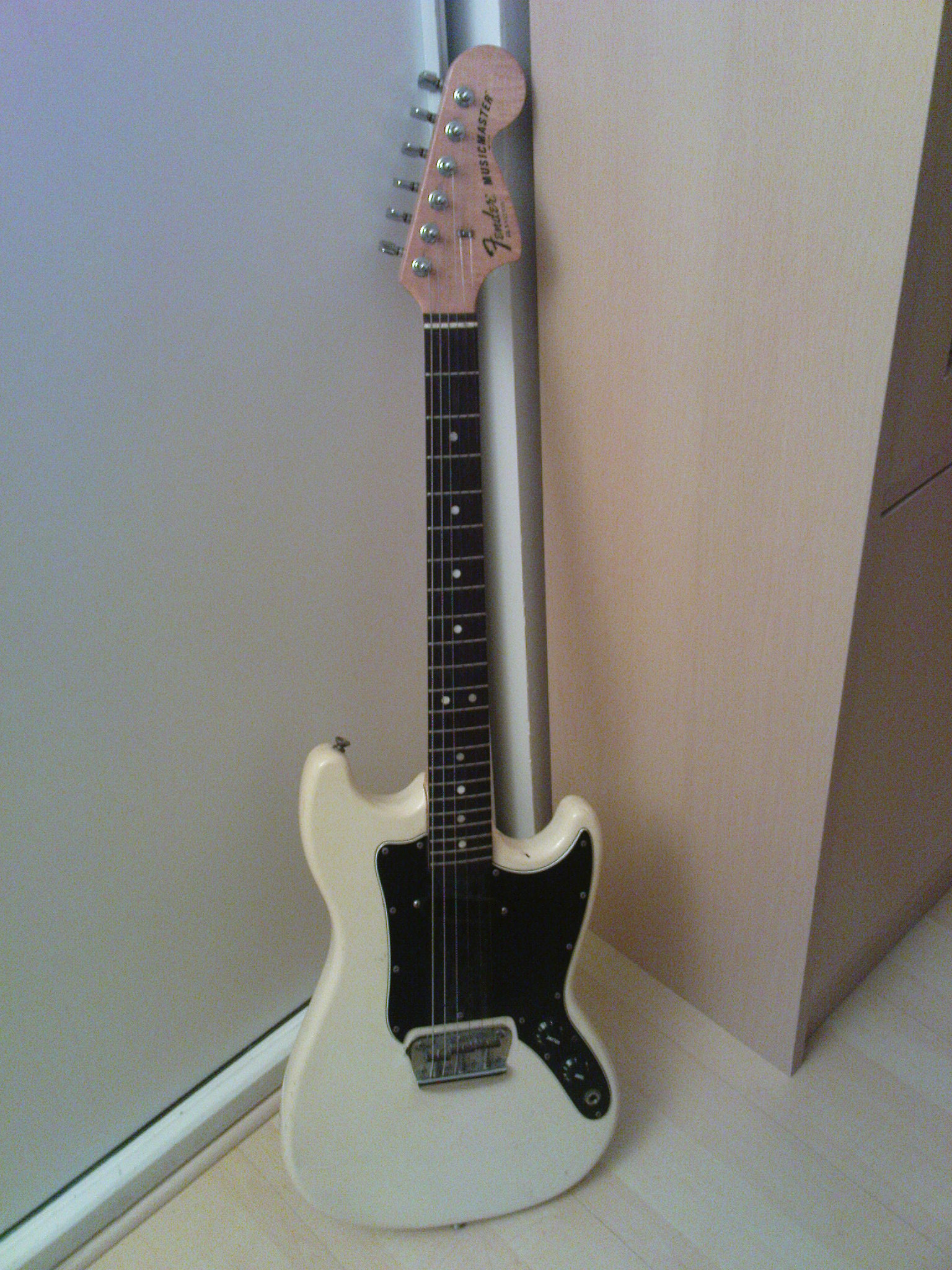
- A 1978 Musicmaster.
- Manufacturer: Fender
- Period: 1956–1982

Construction
- Body type: Solid
- Neck joint: Bolt-on
- Scale: 24 or 22.5 in (610 or 572 mm)

Woods
- Body: Usually Poplar; Alder; Ash
- Neck: Maple
- Fretboard: Usually Maple; Rosewood

Hardware
- Bridge: Fixed
- Pickup(s): 1 proprietary single coil, offset variant

Colors available
- Desert Sand, Shaded Sunburst, Red-Mahogany, Olympic White, Daphne Blue, Dakota Red

The Fender Musicmaster is a solid body electric guitar produced by Fender. It was the first 3/4 scale student-model guitar Fender produced. A Musicmaster Bass model was also put on the market. Musicians such as David Byrne and Liz Phair used a Fender Musicmaster.

== History ==
=== 1955–1963 ===
Design work on the Musicmaster-and its two-pickup variant Duo-Sonic-began in late 1955 following a request from Fender Sales. Prototypes were made in early 1956, followed by sales literature announcing both models. Production of the Musicmaster began in late April of that year, using a body routed for two pickups to be common to the Duo-Sonic, which followed a little more than two months later. The Duo-Sonic and Musicmaster also shared a single-piece maple neck and fingerboard, with a 22.5 inch scale length and 21 frets.

There was one major redesign of these two Musicmaster-bodied guitars, in 1959 when the entire Fender catalog was updated. At this time, the Musicmaster and Duo-Sonic both received a plastic pickguard in place of the previous anodized aluminum one, and a two-piece maple neck with a rosewood fingerboard.

=== 1964–1982 ===
In 1964, following the release of the Fender Mustang, both the Musicmaster and Duo-Sonic were redesigned using Mustang neck and body blanks. The Mustang body was larger and slightly offset, and was fitted with a plastic pickguard but with the volume and tone controls mounted on a separate metal plate. The headstock was also enlarged. All three models were offered with the option of a 24-inch scale and 22-fret neck or a 22.5-inch scale and 21-fret neck; the 24-inch scale proved to be the most popular of these options. The redesigned Musicmaster II alongside its stablemate the Duo-Sonic II lasted through 1969 before both models were dropped from production in favor of the more deluxe Mustang and new Fender Bronco.

The Musicmaster in its second incarnation was still sold well into the 1970s however, using leftover parts until supplies ran out. In 1969, the Fender Swinger, a particularly interesting byproduct of this surplus was produced using the Musicmaster hardware, electrics, scratchplate, and the seldom ordered 22.5-inch necks, but with a modified Fender Bass V body. Around this same time the Fender Maverick was introduced using similar practices but with leftover Electric XII bodies and necks with Mustang bridges.

Later in the 70s the Musicmaster in its third incarnation was redesigned using the Bronco body and pickguard shapes. These larger pickguards encompassed the entire control cavity which saved production costs for Fender. Certain models of the Musicmaster, especially from between 1978 and 1980, were finished with a coat that reacted negatively with the base coat. This causes many modern surviving Musicmasters from this period to suffer from paint flaking off the body.

The Musicmaster was produced until 1982 when it, the Bronco and the Mustang were dropped in favor of the newer Fender Bullet models.

In 2020, Fender released a special version of the Musicmaster for the Shawn Mendes Music Foundation. It features 2 pickups, a single coil and a humbucker, and is the same as the 2020 Duo-Sonic other than the pickup configuration. Unlike the Duo Sonic, the neck pickup is a humbucker and the single coil is the bridge pickup.

== See also ==
- Fender Duo-Sonic
- Fender Mustang
- Fender Bronco
- Fender Swinger
