= Fender Cyclone =

Series of electric guitars manufactured by Fender

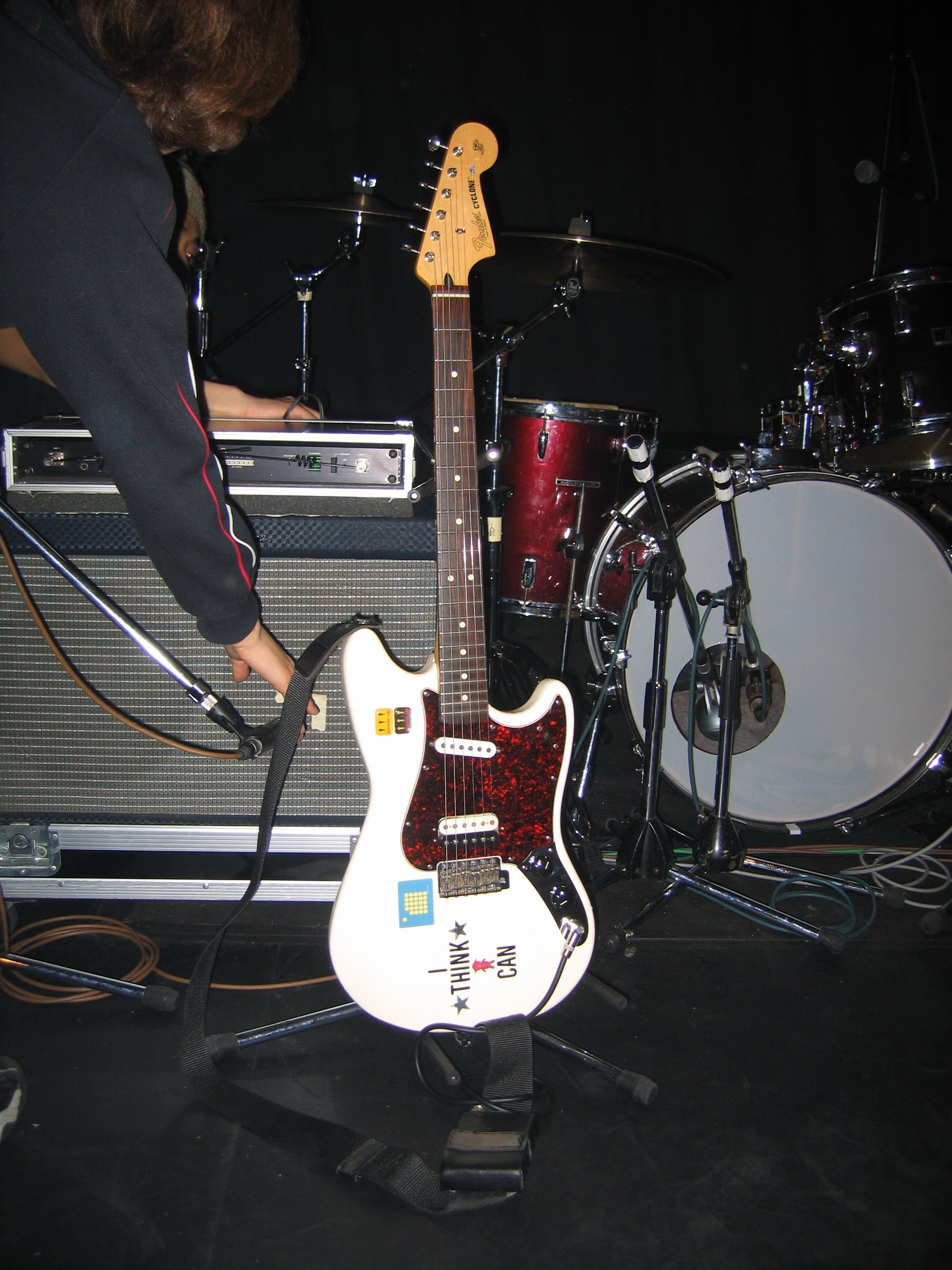
- Manufacturer: Fender
- Period: 1997–2006

Construction
- Body type: Solid
- Neck joint: Bolt-on

Woods
- Body: poplar
- Neck: Maple
- Fretboard: Rosewood

Hardware
- Bridge: Vintage Style Synchronized Tremolo
- Pickup(s): Tex Mex single-coil (neck), Atomic humbucker (bridge)

Colors available
- Black, Chrome Red, Graffiti Yellow, and Caramel Metallic; original colors offered were Candy Apple Red, Black, White, and Vintage Sunburst

Fender US Cyclone
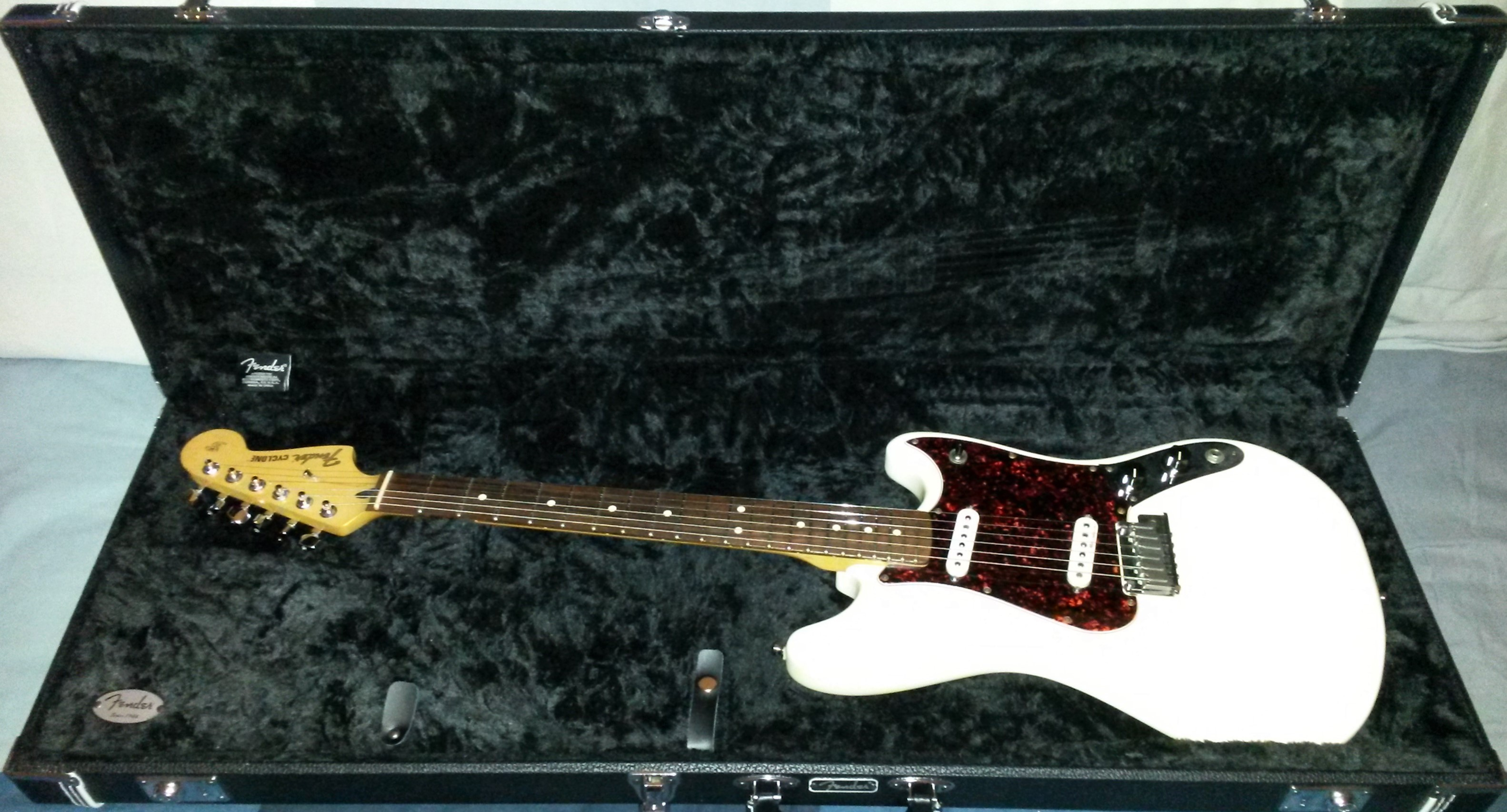
- Fender US Cyclone 2002
- Manufacturer: Fender
- Period: 2000–2002

Construction
- Body type: Solid
- Neck joint: Bolt-on

Woods
- Body: poplar
- Neck: Maple
- Fretboard: Rosewood

Hardware
- Bridge: 2-point synchronized tremolo (Custom: 2-point vintage style synchronized tremolo)
- Pickup(s): Vintage Noiseless single-coils (neck & bridge) (Custom: 2 gold Lace Sensors

Colors available
- Black, Candy Apple Red, White Blonde, Cobalt Blue Transparent, 3-Color Sunburst, Daphne Blue, Olympic White and Dakota Red

Fender Cyclone HH
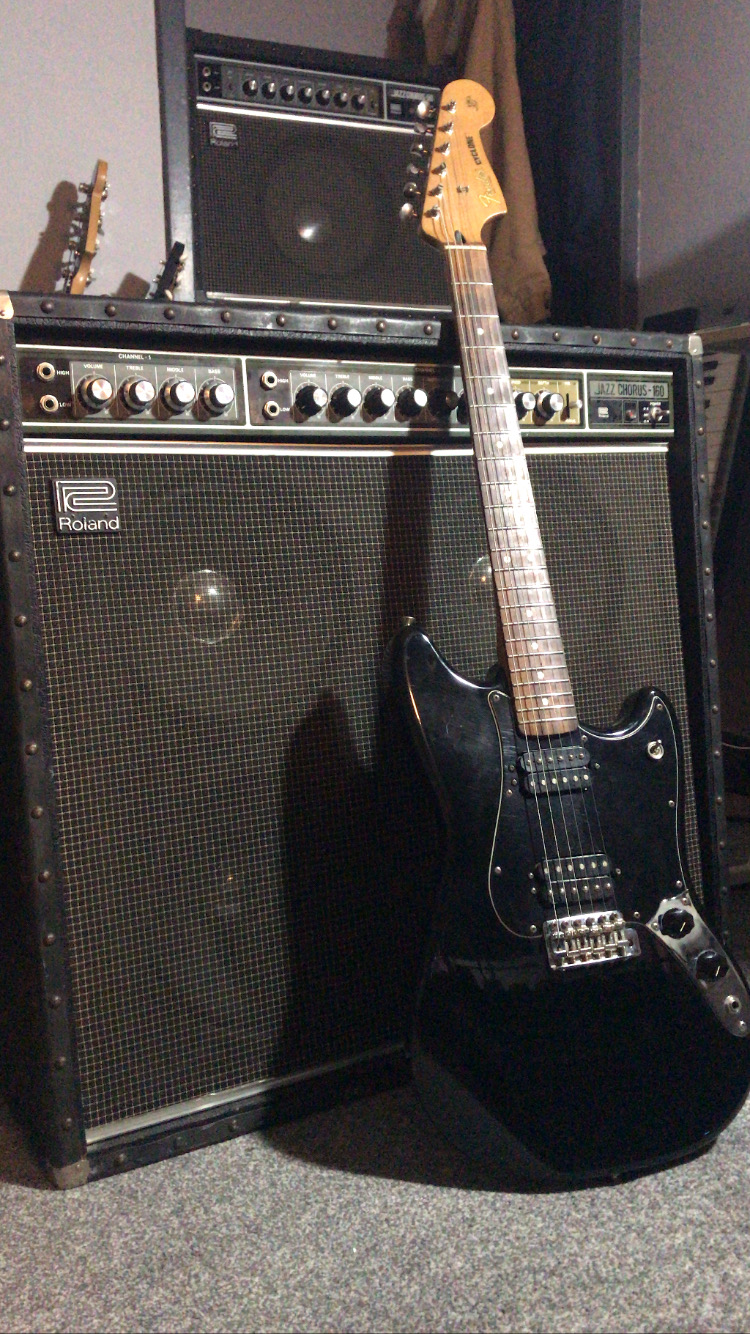
- Manufacturer: Fender
- Period: 2003–2006

Construction
- Body type: Solid
- Neck joint: Bolt-on

Woods
- Body: poplar
- Neck: Maple
- Fretboard: Rosewood

Hardware
- Bridge: Vintage Style Synchronized Tremolo
- Pickup(s): 1 Fender Santa Ana Humbucker, 1 Fender Atomic Humbucker Humbucker

Colors available
- Black, Daphne Blue, Pewter and Orange

Fender Cyclone II
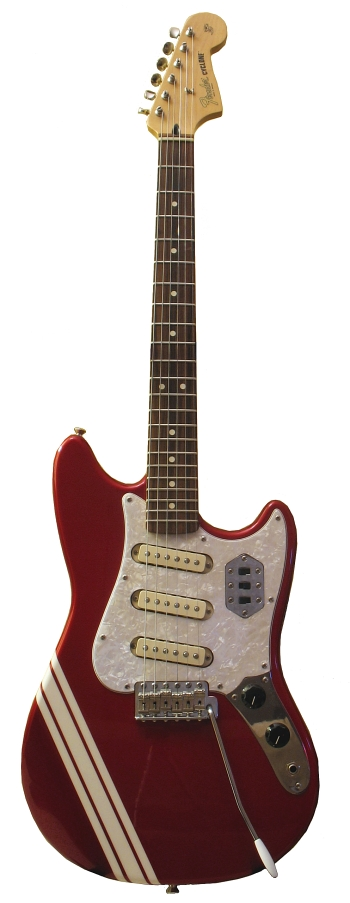
- Manufacturer: Fender
- Period: 2002–2006

Construction
- Body type: Solid
- Neck joint: Bolt-on

Woods
- Body: poplar
- Neck: Maple
- Fretboard: Rosewood

Hardware
- Bridge: Vintage Style Synchronized Tremolo
- Pickup: 3 Special Design American Vintage Jaguar Single-coil

Colors available
- Daphne Blue and Candy Apple Red

Fender Japan Cyclone
- Manufacturer: Fender Japan
- Period: 2024-present

Construction
- Body type: Solid
- Neck joint: Bolt-on

Woods
- Body: Poplar
- Neck: Maple
- Fretboard: Maple or rosewood

Hardware
- Bridge: Vintage Style Synchronised Tremolo
- Pickup(s): Special design bridge humbucker and neck single coil

The Fender Cyclone denotes a series of electric guitars made by Fender. Introduced in late 1997, the Cyclone body is similarly styled to the Mustang, but it is a quarter of an inch thicker than the body of a Mustang and is made of poplar, whereas contemporary Mustang reissues were made of basswood.

In July 2002, the Cyclone II was introduced as the successor to the Fender Cyclone and featured cosmetic changes such as the Mustang racing stripe as well as 3 vintage single-coil pickups and switching borrowed from the Fender Jaguar. As of 2006 the range included the original Cyclone, the Cyclone HH with two humbuckers, and the Cyclone II with three MIA Jaguar pickups controlled by on-off switches in place of the selector switch. As of January 2007, all original Cyclone variants had been discontinued by Fender. In 2020, Fender's budget brand Squier reissued the Cyclone II as part of its Paranormal Series. The 2020 model was available in Shell Pink or Daphne Blue, with an Indian Laurel fingerboard. The 2021 model was available in Candy Apple Red and Pearl. It came with Squier Strat pickups instead of the original Jaguar pickups. In 2024, Fender Japan re-issued the Cyclone as a domestic-only limited-edition model.

== Cyclone ==
The Cyclone has a scale of 24.75 inches (the same as a Gibson Les Paul but an unusual intermediate size for Fender), and a Fender Stratocaster-style synchronized tremolo. The original Cyclone used an Atomic humbucking pickup in the bridge, a Tex-Mex pickup in the neck position, and a conventional 3-way toggle switch.

== US Cyclone ==
The Cyclone was also promoted as a USA-made guitar for a brief time in 2000. The US Cyclone featured two dual-coil ceramic Vintage Noiseless single-coils and a modern 2-point synchronized vibrato with stainless steel saddles. The Custom Cyclone had similar features, but used two Gold Lace Sensor pickups with black covers and a custom vintage 2-point tremolo bridge with bent solid steel saddles. Both guitars were made at the Fender Custom Shop. These American-made Cyclones were gone at the end of 2002.

== Cyclone II ==
Introduced as the successor to the Cyclone in July 2002, the Cyclone II features changes such as the Mustang racing stripe as well as pickups and switching borrowed from the Jaguar. The guitar employs three pickups angled in a similar fashion to the Telecaster bridge pickup, rather than the standard two straight pickups of a Jaguar. It also features a Jazzmaster headstock similar to a 1970s Strat. It has vintage tuning heads as well as vintage nickel string saddles, which were found on 1950s model Strats. It was available in a choice of two colours, Candy Apple Red and Daphne Blue, both with the white racing stripe found on the Mustang.

The Cyclone II has a scale of 24.75 inches, a Stratocaster-style synchronized tremolo, and an on/off switch for each pickup. While it is different in design to the Stratocaster, it has seven pickup selections, including bridge pickup with neck pickup or even all three pickups.

== Cyclone HH ==
The Cyclone HH had the same features and specifications as the original Cyclone, except for the addition of a 3-ply black pickguard and a pair of humbucking pickups, a Fender Santa Ana and a Fender Atomic II in the bridge and neck positions. Introduced in 2003, it was discontinued, like the other Cyclone models, in 2007.

The Cyclone HH also included a vintage-style synchronized tremolo, a three-position toggle switch, master volume and tone controls, as well as chrome-plated hardware. It was available in Black, Pewter, Daphne Blue and Orange.

== Paranormal Cyclone ==
In 2020, Squier released the Paranormal Series, a series that released guitars that feature mash-ups of classic Fender models and rereleases of obscure Fender models. Alongside the Toronado, Cabronita Telecaster, Offset Telecaster, 54' Jazz Bass, and Super Sonic, Squier released a new take on the Cyclone II. It features the same thicker Mustang body and Jaguar-Style pickup switch and electronics, but has 3 Alnico Stratocaster Pickups and a bent steel Vintage Style Tremolo Bridge. It comes in Daphne Blue and Shell Pink from the 2020 release, and Pearl and Candy Apple Red from the 2021 release.

== Made in Japan Limited Cyclone ==
In May 2024, in a first for Fender Japan, a limited edition Cyclone was introduced based on the original 1997 model. Equipped with specially designed pickups, this model is available with either a maple or rosewood fretboard, and comes in multiple new finishes. A butterscotch blonde model, exclusive to Fender's Tokyo Flagship store and MikiGakki, comes with a specially engraved neckplate.

== Notable users ==
- John Paul Pitts
- Craig Benzine
- Brian Molko With a humbucker-sized P-90 in the bridge position.
- Sawao Yamanaka
- Zachary Cole Smith
- Erin Lynn Silva
- Lawrence Warner
- Vincent Accardi
