= Fender Katana =

Electric guitar manufactured by Fender

- Manufacturer: Fender
- Period: 1985–1986 - 2016-present

Construction
- Body type: Solid
- Neck joint: Glued-in
- Scale: 24.75 in (629 mm)

Woods
- Neck: Maple
- Fretboard: Rosewood

Hardware
- Bridge: 2-point System I (1985), American Vintage 6-screw or Floyd Rose locking vibrato (2016).
- Pickup: 2 humbuckers

The Fender Katana is an electric guitar built by Fender. It was designed by marketing director Dan Smith in 1985. The Katana was designed to compete with the unconventionally-shaped guitars of the era, such as the Jackson Randy Rhoads, and to satisfy Fender dealers who were suffering from the competition those instruments offered. The Katana did not sell as well as Fender hoped, and it was discontinued in 1986 before being reissued as a Masterbuilt Custom Shop model as part of the Prestige collection three decades later.

The Katana has a maple glued-in neck with bound rosewood fingerboard, offset triangle markers, a 629mm (24.75") scale with 22 frets, a truss rod adjuster at the headstock end. It features a string clamp, an arrow-head-shape headstock and a neck that matches the body color. The guitar has a pair of open-coil humbucking pickups with black bobbins, master volume/TBX tone controls and a 3-way pickup selector, all on body, and a side-mounted jack socket. It also has a 2-point System I locking vibrato unit.

A less expensive Squier version of the Katana - much more commonly available in the used market - was also made, with a single humbucking pickup, a bolt-on short scale neck, vintage-style 6-screw tremolo bridge and a single volume control. It was also available as a bass model with a split-coil P-Bass humbucker, 4-saddle bridge and a medium 32"-inch scale maple neck with a 20-fret rosewood fretboard.
