= Fender Bass V =

Electric bass guitar model

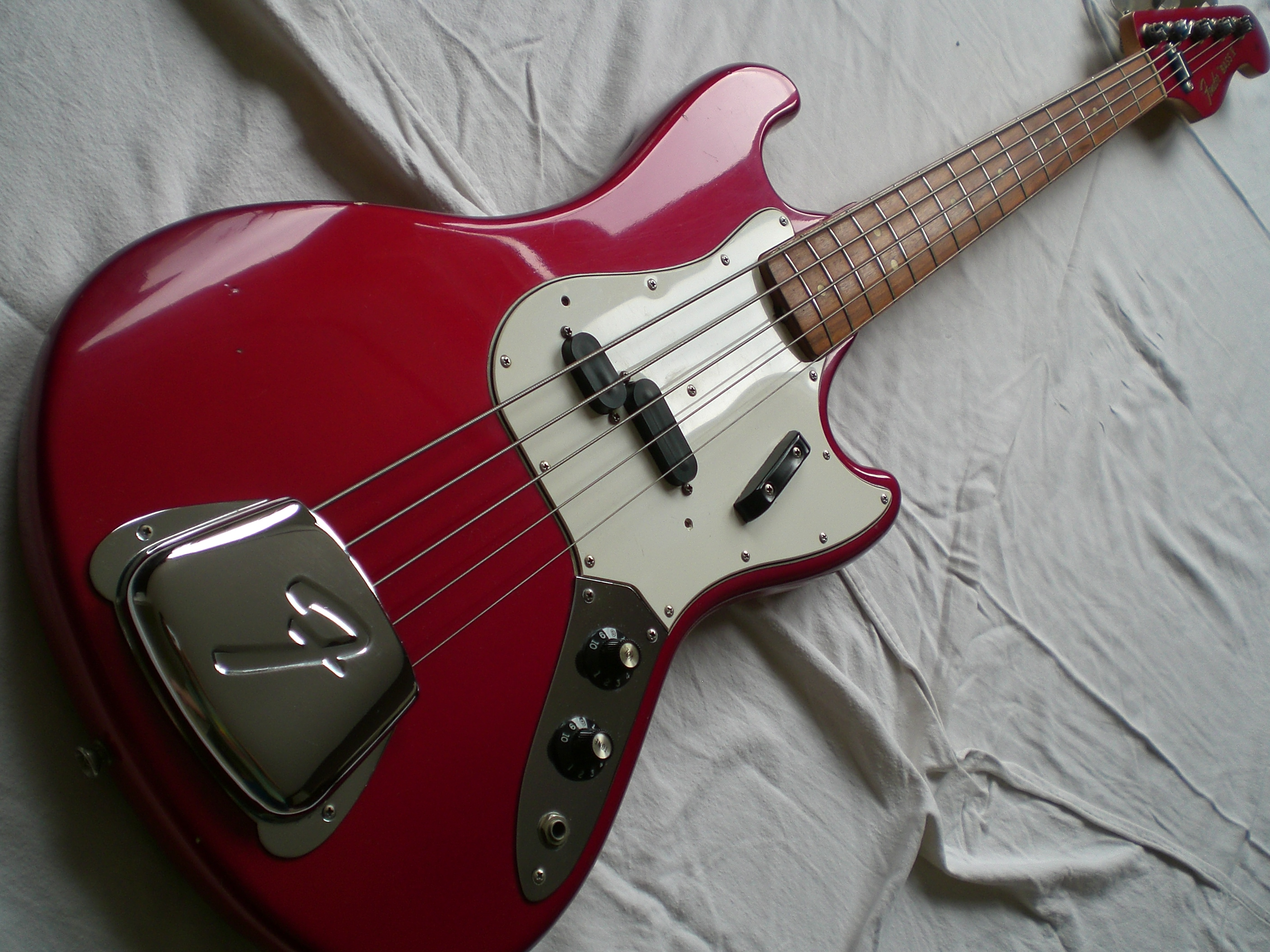
- Manufacturer: Fender
- Period: 1965–1971

Construction
- Body type: Solid
- Neck joint: Bolt-on

Woods
- Body: Alder
- Neck: Maple
- Fretboard: Rosewood

Hardware
- Bridge: Fixed
- Pickup: 1 split single-coil pickup

Colors available
- Sunburst, Black, Olympic White, Candy Apple Red Metallic, Lake Placid Blue Metallic, and all custom finishes offered by Fender at the time

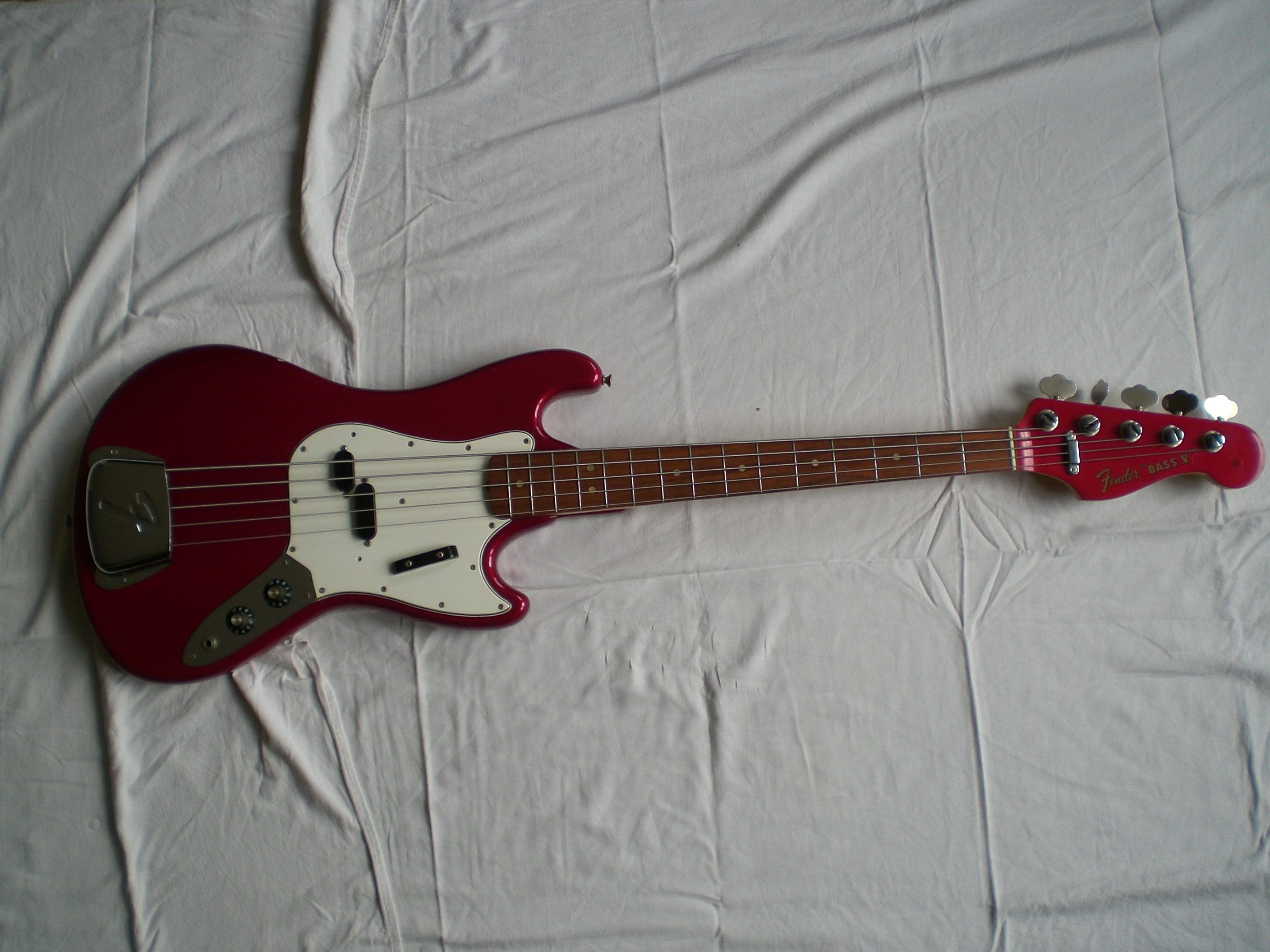
1965 Fender Bass V

The Fender Bass V was a model of electric bass guitar produced by Fender between 1965 and 1971. It was the world's first five-string bass guitar.

At the time the electric bass guitar was still a relatively new instrument, and some manufacturers were still experimenting with design variations that would be considered radical by today's standards. (See the rather unrelated Fender Bass VI for example.)

The Bass V had the same scale length as a Precision Bass, but only had 15 frets. In contrast to modern five-string basses which feature a low B-string, the Bass V features a high C-string. This was supposed to allow reading bass players to reach high notes on the instrument more easily. The top note on the instrument is still the same E♭ as on a standard 20-fret 4 string Jazz or Precision Bass, so strictly speaking the Bass V cannot be regarded as an extended-range bass.

The Bass V originally came with chromed bridge- and pickup-covers.

The innovative concept did not resonate with bass players, partly due to its size and shape. Many also had problems with the narrow string-spacing. Consequently, only about 200 instruments were produced, before the model was discontinued in 1971. Surplus bodies were used in the construction of the Fender Swinger.

In 2016, Squier released the Gary Jarman Signature Bass with a body shape influenced by the Bass V.

== Players ==
Players reported to have owned a Fender Bass V include:

- James Jamerson
- John Paul Jones of Led Zeppelin
- Fred Turner of Bachman-Turner Overdrive
- Walter Becker of Steely Dan

== See also ==
- Fender Jazz Bass V
- Fender Bass V Community Site

== Literature ==
- Peter Bertges. The Fender Reference. Bomots, Saarbrücken. 2007. ISBN 978-3-939316-38-1.
