= Fender Mustang =

US solid body electric guitar

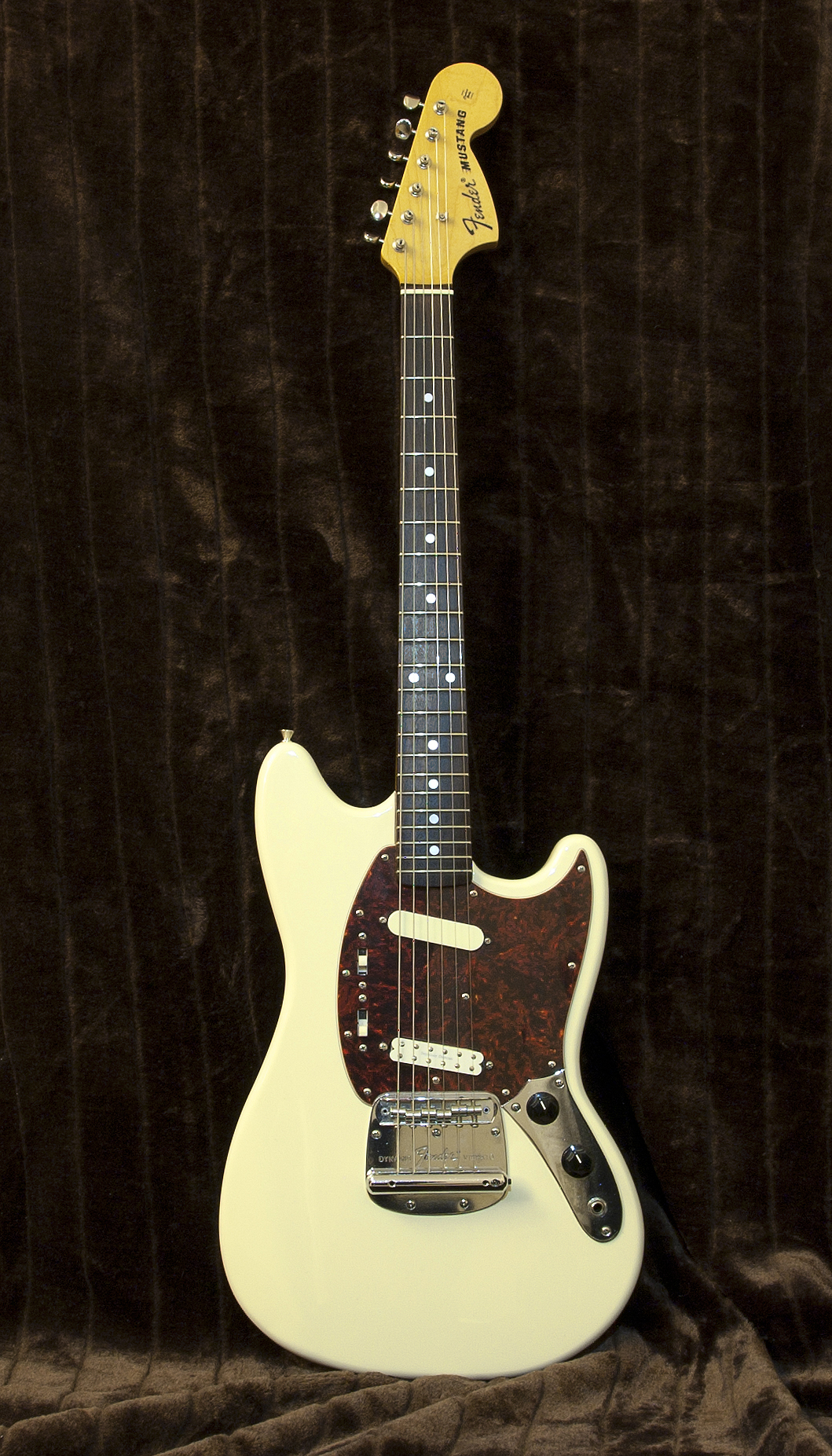
- Fender Mustang in Vintage White with an aftermarket bridge pickup.
- Manufacturer: Fender
- Period: 1964–1982, 1990–present

Construction
- Body type: Solid
- Neck joint: Bolt-on
- Scale: 24 or 22.5 in (609.6 or 571.5 mm)

Woods
- Body: Usually Poplar; Alder; Ash
- Neck: Maple
- Fretboard: Usually Rosewood; Maple; Pau ferro

Hardware
- Bridge: Fender "Dynamic" Vibrato
- Pickup: 2 proprietary single coils

Colors available
- Daphne Blue, Seafoam Green, Dakota Red, Olive Green, Olympic White, Competition Red, Competition Blue, Competition Orange, Sunburst, Walnut, sonic blue

The Fender Mustang is a solid body electric guitar produced by the Fender Musical Instruments Corporation. It was introduced in 1964 as the basis of a major redesign of Fender's student models, the Musicmaster and Duo-Sonic. It was produced until 1982 and reissued in 1990.

In the 1990s, the Mustang attained cult status largely as a result of its use by a number of alternative rock bands, in particular grunge bands, most notably played by Nirvana frontman Kurt Cobain.

The Mustang features two single-coil pickups, an unusual pickup switching configuration, and a unique vibrato system. It was originally available in two short scale lengths: 24 inches (609.6 mm) and 22.5 inches (571.5 mm).

== History ==
The Mustang has an offset waist, reminiscent of the Jazzmaster, but its overall styling closely followed the existing student models the Musicmaster and Duo-Sonic, the slight waist offset being the main change. After the release of the Mustang, the Musicmaster and Duo-Sonic were redesigned using the Mustang body. The new versions were branded the Musicmaster II and Duo-Sonic II, but the decals were not consistently applied.

All three Mustang-bodied models (Mustang, Musicmaster II and Duo-Sonic II) were offered with the option of two necks: a 21 fret, 22.5-inch (or 3/4 scale) neck, or a 22 fret, 24-inch neck. The 24-inch version was overwhelmingly more popular, and the 22.5-inch scale examples are rare. A 24-inch scale is still relatively short, used in the Fender Jaguar but a full inch and a half shorter than the Stratocaster and three-quarters of an inch shorter than the Gibson Les Paul. The short scale may make playing easier for people with small hands, and also lowers string tension for a given pitch, making string bending easier.

Its short scale, combined with a relatively low cost and extremely direct vibrato arm, made the Mustang a cult guitar in the 1990s. Before that, its low cost and marketing as a student guitar made it an obvious candidate for aftermarket upgrades, particularly pickup changes and also amateur finishes. Its wiring with the original pickups also lent itself to custom modifications.

In 1966, Fender issued the Fender Mustang Bass. A new bass body was designed with a offset body style similar to that of the Mustang guitar, and a short (30-inch) scale was used.

In 1969, Fender released the "Competition" Mustang with a "racing stripe" paint job and painted headstocks. Body contours were also added at this time. The Competition Mustangs came in Competition Red, Competition Blue (known as Competition Burgundy in the Fender catalog) and Competition Orange. This paint scheme was heavily influenced by the Shelby Mustang cars of the late 1960s.

In 1982, Fender discontinued both the Mustang and the Musicmaster II. These were the last of the offset student models to be made. Fender replaced the Mustang line with the short-lived Fender Bullet line of guitars and basses before relegating production of their student guitars to their Squier division.

=== Re-issues since the 1990s ===
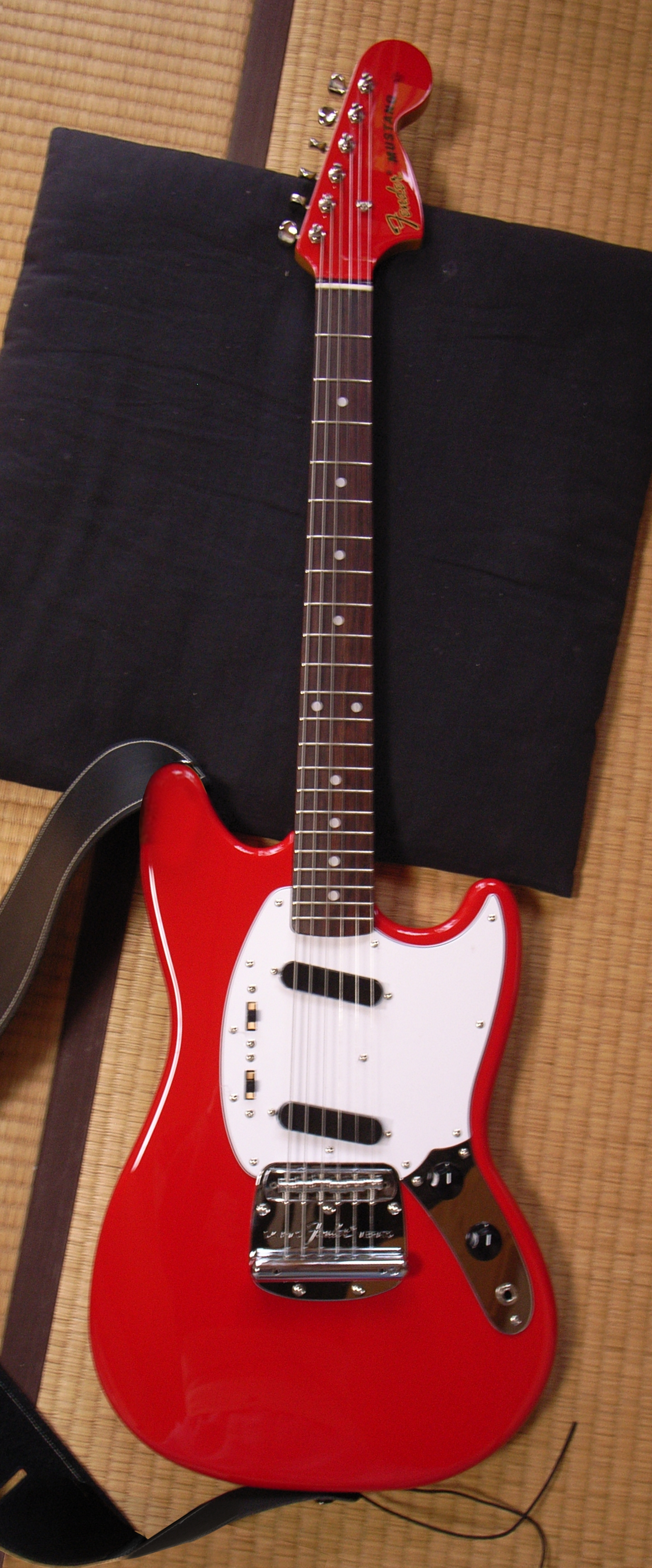
A Japanese Mustang.

In 1990, Fender reissued the Mustang, largely as a result of the vintage movement prevalent at the time. Among grunge and punk rock guitarists, Fender's discontinued models (budget models such as the Duo-Sonic and high-end models such as the Jazzmaster and Jaguar) had become extremely popular. Such models had Fender quality, but were less expensive secondhand than vintage Stratocasters and Telecasters.

The reissued Mustang is made in Japan and available in only the 24-inch scale. While the original Mustangs used mostly poplar wood for the body (with some rarely documented cases of mahogany), MG-72 Mustang reissues are made of the similar basswood, and the newer MG-65 reissues revert to the original poplar. The natural-finished MG-77 reissue is made of ash.

In 2011, Fender released a new Mustang model in the Pawn Shop series, called the Mustang Special. The model features an offset Mustang body shape and a 24-inch scale neck, but with humbucking pickups and a hard-tail Stratocaster bridge.

In 2012, Fender announced a Kurt Cobain Signature Mustang. This model is based on Cobain's modified Mustangs that he played during the In Utero Tour. Instead of having two single-coil pickups, it had a Seymour Duncan JB humbucker in the bridge and a normal Mustang single coil in the neck. It also had an angled Fender adjusto-matic bridge instead of the standard Mustang bridge. Originally, finish colors included Fiesta Red, Sonic Blue and Dark Lake Placid Blue with Competition Stripe, however, by 2015, the Kurt Cobain Mustang was produced only in Sonic Blue. It is the first Mustang model to be sold in Europe in both right-handed and left-handed versions.

In 2012, Squier released a new Mustang in the Vintage Modified series, with similar specifications to those of the original version, but using more modern materials. There was also a double-humbucker version introduced as a Bullet model.

In 2013, Fender released the Modern Player Mustang, a newer take on the old student model. It featured two Fender MP-90 pickups, which are similar to the P-90. It has a modern 9.5" neck radius, and was offered in Daphne Blue and Honeyburst.

In 2013, Fender introduced the American Special Mustang, the first production Mustang made in the United States since the original run was discontinued. The American Special Mustang is significantly different from vintage models, and eliminated many unconventional features of the original Mustang. It retains the traditional Mustang shape and scale length, but has two Fender Atomic Humbuckers with conventional three-way wiring, a more conventional Adjusto-matic bridge and a fixed tailpiece.

In 2016, Fender released two versions of the Mustang: the Mustang (with two single coil pickups in Olympic White, Black and Olive) and the Mustang 90 (with two MP90 pickups in Olympic White, Torino Red and Silver), both in a 24" scale. They have a string-through-body hardtail 'Strat' bridge (no vibrato system as was found on previous Mustangs), with vintage-like bent-steel saddles. These guitars, and a re-introduced Duo-Sonic range, form the 'Offset Series' and are made in Mexico. The bodies are alder while the necks are maple, with maple or rosewood fretboards. The rosewood fretboards were replaced by pau ferro in 2017, in response to new CITES restrictions on the trading of rosewood. Two colors were also introduced: Shell Pink for the Mustang and 2-Color Sunburst for the Mustang 90.

In 2018, Fender introduced an American Performer variant of the Mustang with an updated version of the original style vibrato system, Tim Shaw designed Yosemite pickups, and a three way selector switch instead of the original's on-off and phase switches above the pickups.

In 2021, Fender announced the Ben Gibbard Mustang as part of their Artist Signature series, designed to Death Cab for Cutie frontman Gibbard's specifications and inspired by the 1970s Mustangs he uses on tour. The guitar features several unique features including a chambered ash body, custom pickups, modified hardtail bridge, and simplified controls.

== Electronics ==
The Mustang has two angled single-coil pickups, each with an adjacent on-off-on switch, and a master tone and volume control.

Many Mustangs have neither a pickup selector nor a circuit selector switch, instead just using the two pickup switches to allow the pickups to be used either singly or in parallel. The second on position reverses the phase of the selected pickup, allowing the pickups to be either in or out of phase when in parallel. This phasing option was also unusual for 1964.

It also meant that, as both pickups were floating with respect to ground, it was possible to modify the wiring to put the pickups into series either in or out of phase without excessive noise. The unusual switching could also be replaced with a conventional 3 way pickup selector switch, such as found on the early Fender Duo-Sonic models. However this usually requires modification of the pickguard and routing of the body. Installing an alternative pickup selector switch on the Mustang, like seen on early Duo-Sonics, can thus free up the two, eight-terminal, pickup switches for other uses. Some players choose and prefer this option. As with many student guitars, aftermarket pickup additions and changes are commonly found in many vintage examples.

== Vibrato arm ==
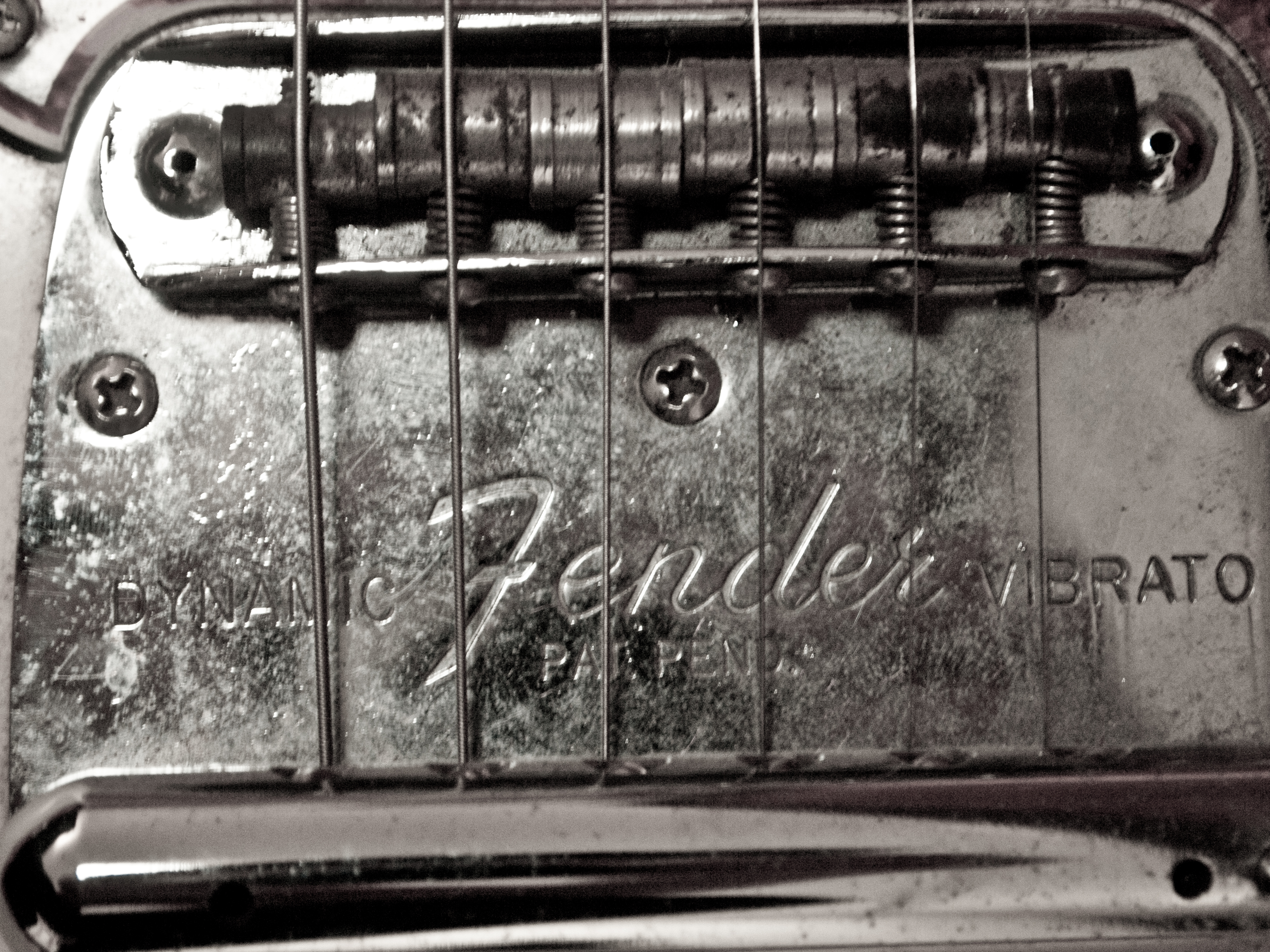
Dynamic Vibrato, unique to the Fender Mustang.

The Mustang introduced the Fender Dynamic Vibrato tailpiece, which together with a floating bridge forms the Mustang vibrato system. The floating bridge concept is common to the Fender floating vibrato developed for the Jazzmaster, but on the Mustang the saddles have only a single string slot, while on other Fender guitars there are multiple slots to allow limited adjustment of the string spacing.

The tailpiece was unique when introduced and remains the most unusual feature of the Mustang; Only the Jag-Stang and Fender Custom (Maverick) share this particular mechanism. While not nearly as popular as the Stratocaster synchronized tremolo, some guitarists prefer it over all other vibrato mechanisms. However, some guitarists also claim that the vibrato is too sensitive. Most notably, Fender incorporated it in the custom design which became the Jag-Stang.

No previous Fender student guitar had a vibrato system at all, and the subsequent Fender Bronco used a completely different mechanism, without a floating bridge.

The Mustang was the last of the Fender floating bridge models to be withdrawn, and the first to be reissued. Mustangs have maintained a popular following in Japan.

== Colors ==
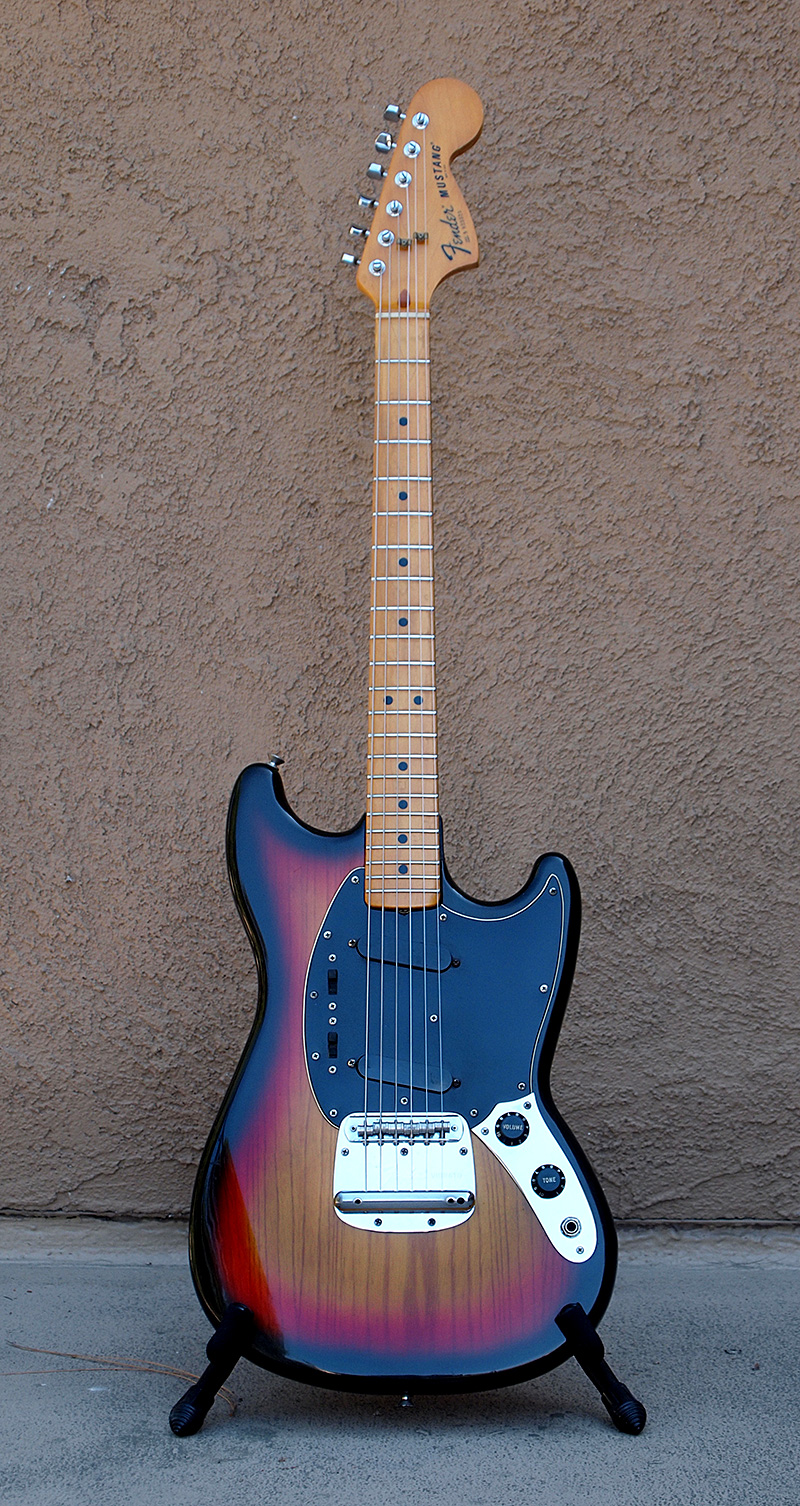
A 1978 sunburst Mustang with a one-piece maple neck.

The Fender Mustang was originally produced in what Fender simply referred to as Blue, White, and Red from 1964–1968. Some now erroneously label these colors as Daphne Blue, Olympic White, and Dakota/Fiesta Red (actually two distinct custom red colors available from Fender) due to their similarity with these custom colors. However, Fender further notes in sales literature of the time that custom colors were not available on Mustangs or other student models of guitar. As such, Daphne Blue, Olympic White, and Dakota or Fiesta Red were never officially offered as Mustang colors. These would have been custom order only colors at the time of the Mustang's initial release, and thus the Mustang was not eligible to receive these finishes according to Fender. Speculation continues that these paint colors may have very well been the same exact custom paint formulations offered on other eligible Fender guitars, but it is not known with 100% certainty, although it is certainly probable.

In 1969, Fender made several significant changes to the manufacture of the Mustang. Body and arm contours were added, and the guitars were now offered in several "Competition Colors" for the first time. These were as follows;

Competition Burgundy with light blue stripes. The main body color is similar to Lake Placid Blue, and it remains a mystery as to why Fender called this "Burgundy Blue".

Competition Red (essentially Candy Apple Red) with white stripes, and;

Competition Orange with red-orange stripes.

These were the first three original competition finishes offered. As stated, each were also fitted with a set of "racing stripes" across the arm contour. Competition Mustangs are the only original Fender guitars to be produced with these "racing stripes" which make them very collectible. The competition Mustangs produced from 1969 to mid 1970 came with a matching headstock; from then until the retirement of competition color schemes, an unpainted headstock was standard. The matching headstock models seem to be more desirable with collectors than the non matching models.

Mid-to-late 1970s US Mustangs were produced in sunburst and natural finishes as well as blonde, walnut, and black (with a standard black pickguard, updated from the earlier white pearloid or tortoise shell) and the unique Antigua burst scheme. Later Japanese reissues have been made available in a wide variety of color schemes, many with matching headstocks or in variations never seen in the US. These include competition Mustangs in Vintage White (with dark blue stripe), Capri Orange (with Fiesta Red stripe), and Ocean Turquoise Metallic (with light blue stripe), and non-stripe matching headstock Mustangs in Dakota Red, Fiesta Red and Old Lake Placid Blue. The 2012 Fender Mustang (Kurt Cobain Artist Edition) comes in Fiesta Red, Sonic Blue and Dark Lake Placid Blue with competition stripes. The 2016 Offset Series instruments come in Black, Olive, Olympic White, Torino Red and Silver, with Shell Pink and 2-Color Sunburst being released the following year.

== Notable players ==
- Kurt Cobain (Nirvana)
- Adrian Belew (King Crimson, Frank Zappa, David Bowie, Talking Heads)
- Tom Price (The U-Men, Gas Huffer)
- Liz Phair
- Dave Alvin (The Blasters, X)
- Theresa Wayman (Warpaint)
- Blixa Bargeld (Nick Cave and the Bad Seeds, Einstürzende Neubauten)
- Bilinda Butcher (My Bloody Valentine)
- Matty Healy (The 1975)
- Todd Rundgren (Utopia, solo, producer)
- Rory Gallagher
- Mac DeMarco
- Ryan Jarman (The Cribs)
- Thurston Moore (Sonic Youth)
- John Frusciante (Red Hot Chili Peppers)
- Omar Rodríguez-López (The Mars Volta, At the Drive-In)
- Ben Gibbard (Death Cab for Cutie)
- Nick Allbrook (Pond)
- Fernando Perdomo (The Echo in the Canyon Band)
- Damon Albarn, (Blur)
- Simon Tong (The Verve)
- NOAHFINNCE (Noah Finn Adams)
- Molly Rankin (Alvvays)
- David Byrne (Talking Heads)
- Norah Jones
- Bob Mothersbaugh (DEVO)
- Marika Hackman

== See also ==
- Mustang Bass
- Fender Bronco
- Fender Duo-Sonic
- Fender Cyclone
