= Indian laurel =

Indian laurel can refer to:

- Calophyllum inophyllum
- Ficus microcarpa (Chinese Banyan, Malayan Banyan)
- Ficus retusa
- Litsea glutinosa
- Terminalia elliptica

Though the leaves look similar, they are not at all related to Bay Laurel (Laurus nobilis).
