= Scale length (string instruments) =

Measurement of a string instrument

The scale length of a string instrument is the maximum vibrating length of the strings that produce sound, and determines the range of tones that string can produce at a given tension. It is also called string length. On instruments in which strings are not "stopped" (typically by frets or the player's fingers) or separated (such as in the piano), it is the actual length of string between the nut and the bridge.

String instruments produce sound through the vibration of their strings. The range of tones these strings can produce is determined by three primary factors: the linear density of the string, that is its mass per unit length (which is determined by its thickness and the density of the material), the tension placed upon it, and the instrument's scale length.

Generally, a string instrument has all strings approximately the same length, so the scale length can be expressed as a single measurement, e.g., the violin and most guitars.

== Bowed strings ==
=== Violin family ===
The two most famous violin makers, Antonio Stradivari (1644–1737) and Giuseppe Guarneri del Gesù (1698–1744), both used an open string length of 12.8 inches (330 mm) for their violins, which had already been established a generation before by Jacob Stainer (c. 1617–1683). Later makers have been unwilling to deviate from this. (There was variance in scale length in the earliest violins, and almost all of those in current use have had the necks replaced, with the original scroll grafted, so statements of consistent scale length during that time is somewhat speculative.)

Smaller scale instruments are used extensively to teach younger players. The size of these is described by a "conventional" fraction that has no mathematical significance. For example, a 7/8 violin has a scale of about 317 mm, a 3/4-size instrument a scale of 307 mm, a half-size one 287 mm, and a quarter-size one 267 mm. 1/8, 1/10, 1/16 and 1/32 and even 1/64 violins also exist, becoming progressively smaller, but again in no proportional relationship. (A full-size instrument is described as 4/4.)

Cellos exist in a smaller range of sizes than violins, with 4/4, 3/4, 1/2, 1/4, 1/8, and 1/10 being reasonably common. As with the violin, the Stradivarius scale is regarded as standard for orchestral work; This is about 27.4 inches (700 mm).

Violas are commonly described in terms of their body length rather than by a fraction. There are two reasons for this. First, unlike that of the violin and the cello, the viola scale length has not standardised, but rather advanced players use whatever scale length best suits them. Secondly, student sizes are not as often required, as most viola players who start learning at a young age start on the violin. Common sizes include 17 inches (430 mm), 16 1/2 inches (420 mm), 16 inches (410 mm), 15 1/2 inches (390 mm), 15 inches (380 mm), 14 inches (360 mm), and less commonly 12 inches (300 mm), smaller than a standard violin; These measurements are nominal and approximate. At least one of the surviving Stradivarius violas has a scale length of 14 1/4 inches (360 mm).

=== Double bass ===
There is some variation in the scale length of an orchestral double bass, generally in the range 41.3–43.3 inches (1,050–1,100 mm). There are also smaller versions of this "full scale" double bass with the same scale length but with a smaller sound box, intended for other musical idioms. Smaller scale instruments are also quite commonly used by fully-grown players in jazz, folk music and similar ensembles.

The system of conventional fractions is taken to its logical conclusion with string bass sizes, in that a full-size (4/4) bass is uncommon. Most basses are 3/4 or 7/8, and younger players can use 1/2 or even 1/4 size instruments.

== Guitars ==
=== Classical guitar ===
Like that of the violin, the scale of the classical guitar was standardized by the work of its most famous maker. Antonio De Torres (1817–1892) used a scale length of 25.6 inches (650 mm), and later makers have followed suit. However, beginning in the mid-20th century luthiers seeking increased volume moved to a 26 inches (660 mm) scale, which is now the standard for such leading makers as Ramirez.

=== Steel-string acoustic guitar ===
The steel-string acoustic guitar typically has a scale slightly shorter than the classical instrument, the most common scales ranging between short scale (24 inches (610 mm)) and long scale (25.5 inches (650 mm)). Small travel guitars and guitars specifically designed for children can have even shorter scales. For example, a 3/4 size steel string guitar might have a scale length of 23 inches (580 mm).

=== Electric guitar ===
Electric guitars reflect the range of scale lengths found with steel-string acoustics. With regard to tone, a longer scale favors "brightness" or cleaner overtones and more separated harmonics versus a shorter scale, which favors "warmth" or more muddy overtones. According to Dave Hunter's Tone Manual (2011), each scale length has its characteristic sound and tone, which is individual from other sounds in the tone chain: strings, pickups, pedals, amplifiers, speakers, and cabinets.

Gibson uses a scale length of 24 3/4 inches (630 mm) on most of its electric guitars, including the ES-335, Les Paul, SG, Flying V, and Explorer. Gibson has used other scale lengths on various models through the years. Gibson's nominal "24.75" in scale length has itself varied, sometimes measuring 24 5/8 or 24 9/16 inches (625 or 624 mm) depending on the production equipment used. As Gibson necks are not typically interchangeable, this usually goes unnoticed in practice.

Most Fender electric guitars, including the Telecaster, Stratocaster, and Jazzmaster, use a scale length of 25.5 inches (650 mm). A few Fender models such as the Jaguar and Mustang, which was introduced as a student model, use a scale length of 24 inches (610 mm). Fender has also built some 3/4-size student guitars with a scale length of 22.5 inches (570 mm) or shorter.

As many superstrats are based on Fender Stratocaster, they also ended up adopting the 25.5 inches (650 mm) scale length. Seven-string guitars may use the same scales range across the fretboard (i.e. for all string), ranging from 25.5 inches (650 mm) all the way to 27 inches (690 mm), while eight-string guitars may use scale ranging from 26.5 inches (670 mm) all the way to 28 inches (710 mm). Alternatively, they may use Multi-scale fingerboards, such that the high string has a 25.5 inches (650 mm) scale length, and then gradually lengthen until the lowest string is at around 27 inches (690 mm) scale length.

=== Bass guitar ===
The first electric basses were upright electric basses built in the 1930s by fitting an otherwise normal double bass with electric pickups, and so had a scale length of about 43 in (1,100 mm). When the electric bass guitar was popularized by the release in 1951 of the Fender Precision Bass, its shorter scale length of 34 in (860 mm) was established as the standard scale length for a bass guitar. An instrument with a scale of 30 in (760 mm) or less is considered "short scale". A "medium scale" of 32 in (810 mm), halfway between the two, also exists, but is less common. Some five- and six-string models use a 35-inch scale to allow for better resonance of the low B-string.

=== Lap steel guitar ===
- Lap steel guitar: (six-string electric) 22.5 to 23.25 inches (572 to 591 mm).

== Other chordophones ==
=== Mandolin family ===
- Mandolin: 13–14 inches (330–360 mm). Classical bowlback mandolins are often 13 in. (same as violin), Gibson mandolins (and many others that follow Gibson) are 13.875 in. Some manufacturers, such as Weber, use 14 in.
- Mandola: 16.5 inches (420 mm)
- Octave mandolin: 22.75 inches (578 mm)
- Mandocello 27 inches (690 mm)

=== Ukulele ===
- Soprano ukulele: 13.6 inches (350 mm)
- Concert ukulele: 14.75 inches (375 mm)
- Tenor ukulele: 17 inches (430 mm)
- Baritone ukulele: 20.1 inches (510 mm)
- Contrabass ukulele: 20–21 inches (510–530 mm)

=== Banjo ===
- Banjo: (five-string standard and four-string plectrum) 26 1/4 inches (670 mm)
- Tenor banjo (19 fret) 22 1/4 inches (570 mm)

== Piano ==
The scale length of a piano is the length of the longest string. As this is normally the lowest bass note, it is a single string.

=== Grand piano ===
Concert grand pianos range in scale from about 7 feet 6 inches to 9 feet 0 inches (229 to 274 cm) or occasionally more. Notable concert grands include:

- The Steinway Model D, at 8 feet 11 3/4 inches (273.7 cm).
- The Imperial Bösendorfer, at 9 feet 6 inches (290 cm) with 97 keys.
- The Fazioli F308 at 10 feet 2 inches (310 cm).

Smaller grand pianos vary in naming. The larger models, about 6 feet (180 cm) or more in scale length, may have the full grand piano action, and are used in smaller concert spaces. Others are intended for larger homes, and may have a simplified action lacking the repeat lever that is only useful for advanced players. Baby grand pianos are smaller, intended for homes, restaurants and similar applications where the grand style of piano is desired even at the expense of the longer scale and better sound that an upright piano would permit in the available space.

== See also ==
- Fingerboard
- Multi-scale fingerboard
