= Fender Eric Clapton Stratocaster =

Fender Stratocaster signature model

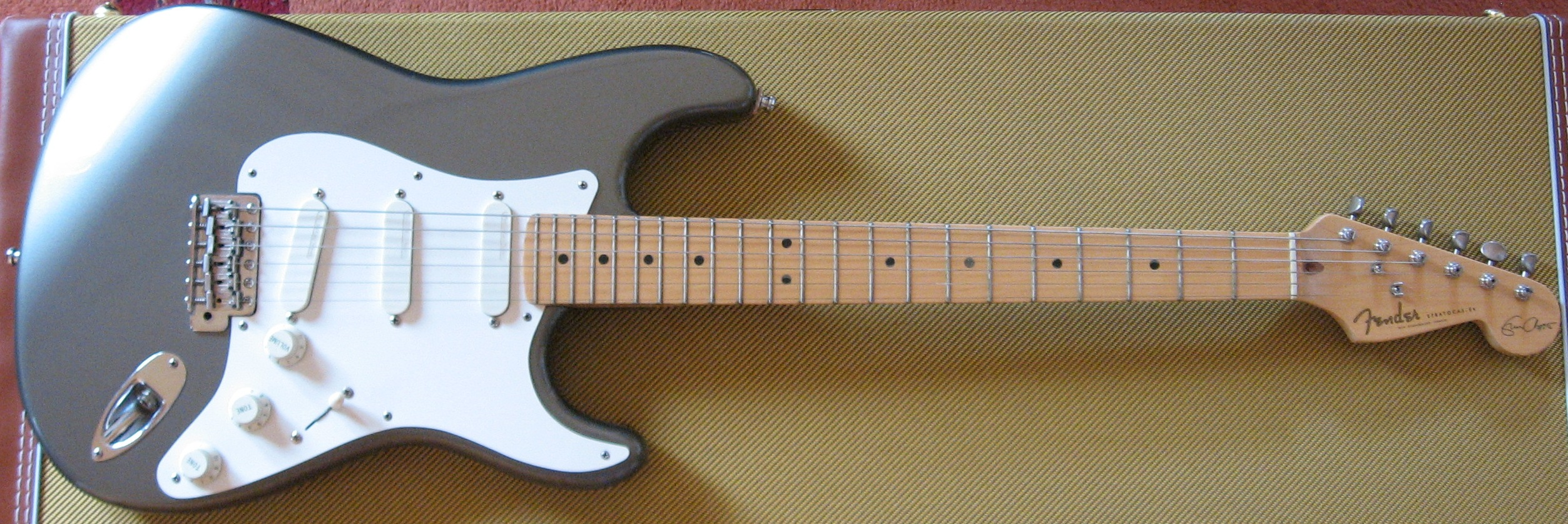
- Fender Eric Clapton Stratocaster 1988
- Manufacturer: Fender
- Period: 1988–present

Construction
- Body type: Solid
- Neck joint: Bolt-on

Woods
- Body: Alder
- Neck: Maple
- Fretboard: Maple, Rosewood (1992 only)

Hardware
- Bridge: Blocked Synchronized Tremolo
- Pickup(s): (2001–present): 3 Vintage Noiseless single-coils (1988–2000): 3 Gold Lace Sensors

Colors available
- Artist Series: Pewter (from 1988), Torino Red (from 1988), Candy Green (1988–2010), Black (from 1991), Olympic White (from 1996). Custom Artist Series: Mercedes Blue, Midnight Blue, Black, Gold Leaf Metallic (from 2004); 2001 Crashocaster Series: Graffiti Canvas; 2008 10th Anniversary Crossroads Antigua: Antigua Sunburst; 2009 Limited Edition: Daphne Blue, EC Grey; 2019 Limited Edition: Almond Green; 2023 Limited Edition Crossroads Centre 25th Anniversary: Blu Scozia, Graffiti Canvas; Custom Thinskin Nitro: Olympic White, Pewter, Torino Red Custom Journeyman Relic (as of 2017): 2-Colour Sunburst, Aged White Blonde (Ash body), Aged Black (as of 2018)

The Fender Eric Clapton Stratocaster is the signature model electric guitar of English guitarist Eric Clapton. It was the first signature model guitar released by Fender.

== Background ==
Eric Clapton played a range of different Fender and Gibson models while playing in The Yardbirds and Cream. In 1970, for his landmark Layla and Other Assorted Love Songs with Derek and the Dominos, Clapton started using a sunburst 1956 Stratocaster which he later nicknamed Brownie that he had bought in May 1967 while in Cream. While on tour with the Dominos, Clapton visited Sho-Bud Music in Nashville where he bought an additional six mid-50s Stratocasters for around $100 each. On his return to the UK, he gave one to George Harrison, one to Pete Townshend and a third to Steve Winwood. The remaining three each had attractive qualities that Clapton combined in a single instrument. He took the body from a black 1956 Stratocaster he liked the look of, the neck from a 1957 Stratocaster he liked the feel of and the electronics loaded pickguard from another Stratocaster that sounded better than the others, constructing Blackie that was to be his main instrument from 1970 until its retirement from active service in the mid '80s.

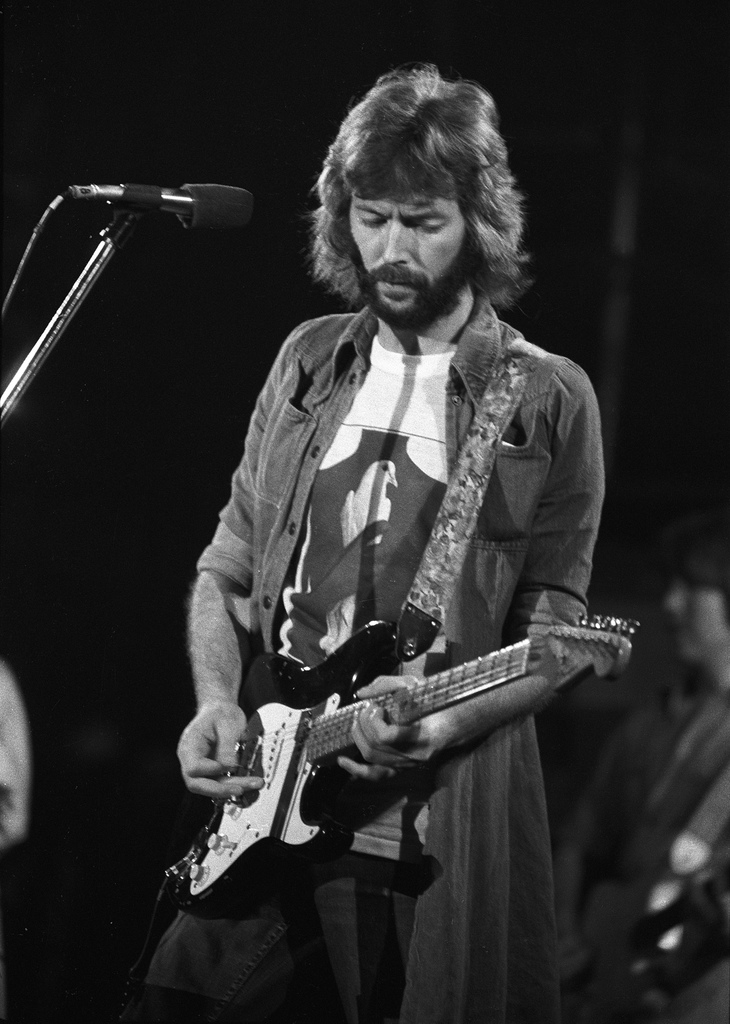
Eric Clapton playing Blackie

By 1983, Blackie had become worn through constant touring to the point that it was essentially unplayable and wouldn't take a further refret. Clapton commissioned Roger Giffin to build two copies of Blackie, one blue and the other green. The blue Giffin strat made its first appearance at the ARMS concert at the Royal Albert Hall on September 20, 1983. Later during this tour, Fender presented Clapton with one of the first 57 reissue strats.

In 1985, Dan Smith approached Clapton to discuss a plan to create a signature guitar built to his own specifications. Clapton asked Fender to make a guitar with the distinctive V-shape neck of his Martin acoustic as well as a "compressed" pickup sound. Based on Clapton's brief, Fender made two early prototypes: one with a neck based on measurements taken from Blackie and one with a slightly softer V shape which Clapton ultimately deemed preferable. Both prototypes featured electronics based on the Elite Stratocaster including its 12 dB MDX mid-boost circuit intended to make the Stratocaster's single-coils sound more like a humbucker. Clapton liked the boost circuit but asked for more dynamic range, prompting Fender to replace the "Elite" pickups with Gold Lace Sensor pickups and an updated MDX circuit that had been tweaked up to deliver 25 dB of boost in the midrange at around 500 Hz.

Clapton first used Gold Lace Sensors on three prototype signature models built by George Blanda and Michael Stevens – one was finished in Torino Red and the other two in Pewter Grey Metallic – in The Prince's Trust Concert, in June 1986.

== Features ==
The first early prototypes made around 1986–87 featured a 21-fret neck, a 21 dB mid-boost circuit, an active/passive toggle switch (which has been deleted on the final release) and Schaller locking strap buttons. The final product (released in 1988) is essentially a vintage 1957 reissue Stratocaster featuring a deeply contoured select alder body, a 1-piece soft V-shaped maple neck fitted with 22 vintage-style frets, flat 9.5" radius and BiFlex truss-rod system, a "blocked" original American Vintage synchronized tremolo, Gotoh/Kluson tuning machines, 1-ply white pickguard and three Fender Gold Lace Sensor pickups powered by an active MDX mid-boost circuit with 25 dB of gain and TBX tone controls, which helped augment the tone of the sound delivered, opening up a wider tonal range Clapton desired.

One of the unique features of this guitar was the inclusion of an original vintage synchronized tremolo bridge blocked off to defeat tremolo usage by a small piece of wood wedged into the bridge cavity. This idea came about as Clapton liked the tone of tremolo-equipped Stratocasters but not their tuning instability plus he had no use for the whammy bar. In 1991 Clapton agreed to have his signature model with a rosewood fretboard as well to suit the needs of players disliking the feel of maple-neck models. Only 94 of these short-lived guitars were made before their production finally came to a halt.

The Lace Sensors in the Clapton Signature Stratocaster were replaced with Fender Vintage Noiseless pickups in 2001 (although Clapton began using the new pickups on his personal guitars in March 2000 and was occasionally seen playing Lace Sensor-equipped Stratocasters until 2010). The Vintage Noiseless pickups were previously available as a standard equipment material on the Fender American Deluxe Series guitars produced before 2004. The Custom Shop version (introduced in 2004) is available in Midnight Blue, Mercedes Blue, Black and Gold Leaf with gold-plated hardware (also available with a "Thinskin" nitrocellulose lacquer finish in Olympic White, Torino Red and Pewter, as well as a left-handed version). The Eric Clapton Custom Journeyman Relic Stratocaster, introduced in 2017, features a 2-piece select ash body, available in 2-Colour Sunburst and Aged White Blonde.

Since their introduction in 2004, all Custom Shop Clapton Stratocasters (Team Built and Master Built) used a standard tone control instead of a TBX tone circuit. The TBX feature has been re-introduced in 2009 on "Team Built" versions; only the "Master Built" models had a normal tone control.

== Construction and design variations ==
Several variations of Clapton's personal guitar were made by the Fender Custom Shop throughout the years, including fancy versions with ash bodies, quilted or maple tops, abalone dot position inlays, matching headstocks, gold hardware and white pearloid pickguards, made by Senior Master Builder J. W. Black. Many of these guitars were sold for charity auctions for the Crossroads Centre of Antigua, the drug and alcohol addiction rehabilitation facility founded on the small, idyllic Caribbean island in 1998. They include the Gold Leaf Stratocaster of 1996 (used during the Legends and Montserrat concerts in 1997) and the Crashocasters (signature model Stratocasters hand-painted by New York-based street artist John Matos, better known as Crash), used by Clapton from 2001 to 2004.

The Gold Leaf Stratocaster The original Gold Leaf guitar was built by Fender Master Builders Mark Kendrick and John Luis Campo as a custom order for Eric Clapton at the time of the 50th Anniversary of the firm in 1996. Clapton used the guitar for his 1997 Far-Eastern tour, the European Legends jazz concerts with Marcus Miller, Joe Sample, Steve Gadd and David Sanborn and the Montserrat benefit concert at the Royal Albert Hall before selling it to Christies for US$455,000.

The Fender Custom Shop reissued the Gold Leaf Stratocaster after 8 years of absence as a limited-edition run of 50 pieces. Each guitar was built to Eric's exacting specifications, with Fender's Vintage Noiseless pickups and a standard tone control instead of the Gold Lace Sensor pickups and TBX tone circuit (re-introduced in 2009) found on the original 1996 model.

The John Matos "Crashocasters" In January 2007, visual artist John "Crash" Matos finished painting the 50th guitar body for a limited edition run of Stratocasters (50 total) from the Fender Custom Shop. The project, which Matos began in late 2004, was inspired by the graffiti-style Stratocaster bodies he had painted for Eric Clapton, one of which, known as Crash-3, was sold in the 2004 Christie's Eric Clapton Crossroads Auction for $321,000.

Since the beginning of the Custom Shop project in 2004, Crash has chronicled his work on the 50 Fender Custom Shop guitars (referred to in this article as the Fender Custom Shop Crashocasters) in his online Modern Guitars journal titled "Crash Pad".

== Limited Edition Crossroads Signature Guitar and Amp Set ==
Fender introduced a matching set of limited-edition Crossroads instruments, which consisted of an Eric Clapton Crossroads Signature Stratocaster (better known as the "Sun Strat" and produced in a limited run of 100 instruments globally) and a Crossroads '57 Twin-Amp (produced in a limited run of 50 pieces). Each guitar is crafted to Clapton's exacting specifications and bear a unique "Crossroads Antigua" smiling sun graphic designed and originally hand-drawn by Eric Clapton himself.

The commemorative Crossroads '57 Twin-Amps are modeled after the original '57 Twin. This limited-edition amplifier features a custom engraved commemorative "Crossroads 2007" badge autographed by Eric and his "Crossroads Antigua" graphic is artistically embedded on the grill cloth. Bearing in mind the number of changes he makes with regards to neck dimensions, Clapton fans purchasing this will be getting an exact replica as used at the Crossroads Guitar Festivals 2007, 2010, 2013 & 2019.

== 2009 Limited Edition Daphne Blue & EC Grey Stratocasters ==
In 2009, the Custom Shop released an exact representation of Clapton's Daphne Blue Stratocaster used during his recent Australasian tours held from February 12 to March 10, 2009, as well as a faithful replication of the EC Grey model he uses since his 2006/07 world tours. The EC Grey finish is slightly darker than Pewter. These limited-edition guitars featured a select alder body, a soft V-shape maple neck with 22 vintage frets, bone nut, three Vintage Noiseless pickups, active mid-boost circuit and a "blocked" original vintage synchronized vibrato. Discontinued in 2011.

== 10th Anniversary Crossroads Antigua Stratocaster ==
In 1978 Fender introduced the Antigua finish on a number of models from the flagship Stratocaster to the classic Coronado Bass. Described as a "rich antique-white finish with halo-mist shading", it became highly prized among collectors around the world. The first Antigua prototype model was awarded to its creator Martin DeCasas who worked on color schemes for Fender from July 1964 till its closing in Fullerton, California in February 1985.

In 2008 Sam Ash Music incorporated the spirit of the Eric Clapton Stratocaster with the spirit of the Crossroads Centre, commissioning a limited run of only 100 pieces of the signature model in the classic Antigua finish along with a commitment to donate $100,000 to the Crossroads Centre. This exclusive instrument is currently being built by the Fender Custom Shop to Clapton's exacting specifications.

Features include a select alder body, 1-piece maple neck with soft "V" shape, 22 vintage style frets, 3 Vintage Noiseless pickups, “blocked” American Vintage synchronized tremolo, active mid-boost circuit (with a TBX tone control as of 2009) and vintage black case. Each instrument is individually numbered from 1 through 100 and comes with an official certificate of authenticity.
