= Fender Jeff Beck Stratocaster =

Fender Stratocaster signature model

The Jeff Beck Stratocaster is an electric solid body guitar made by Fender Musical Instruments for British guitarist Jeff Beck. This Artist Signature guitar was introduced in 1991 and upgraded ten years later. The Custom Shop version, introduced in 2004, is available in Olympic White and Surf Green finishes.

The Jeff Beck model features an alder body finished in polyurethane or "Thinskin" nitrocellulose lacquer, a thinner C-shape maple neck with rosewood fingerboard, 22 medium-jumbo frets, LSR Roller Nut, Schaller locking machine heads (Sperzel "TrimLok" staggered on the Custom Artist version), an "American Standard" two-point-fulcrum vibrato and a contoured heel for easier access to the higher registers. The guitar contains three dual-coil ceramic Hot Noiseless pickups and five-way pickup switching. Other refinements include aged plastic parts, three-ply parchment pickguard and chrome hardware.

Guitars produced before 2001 were based on the Plus Series models of 1987, featuring a deep 1950s U-shape maple neck, three-ply white pickguard, Lace Sensor "Gold" pickups in a humbucking/single-coil/single-coil configuration (two Lace Sensor single-coils in the neck and middle positions and a humbucking Lace Sensor Dually in the bridge), a "TBX" tone circuit affecting the middle and bridge pickups and a mini push-push button for coil-splitting the bridge-position humbucking pickup. These early 1990s Jeff Beck Stratocasters were finished in "Surf Green", "Vintage White", and "Midnight Purple".
