= Fender Jazz Bass =

Fender model of bass guitar

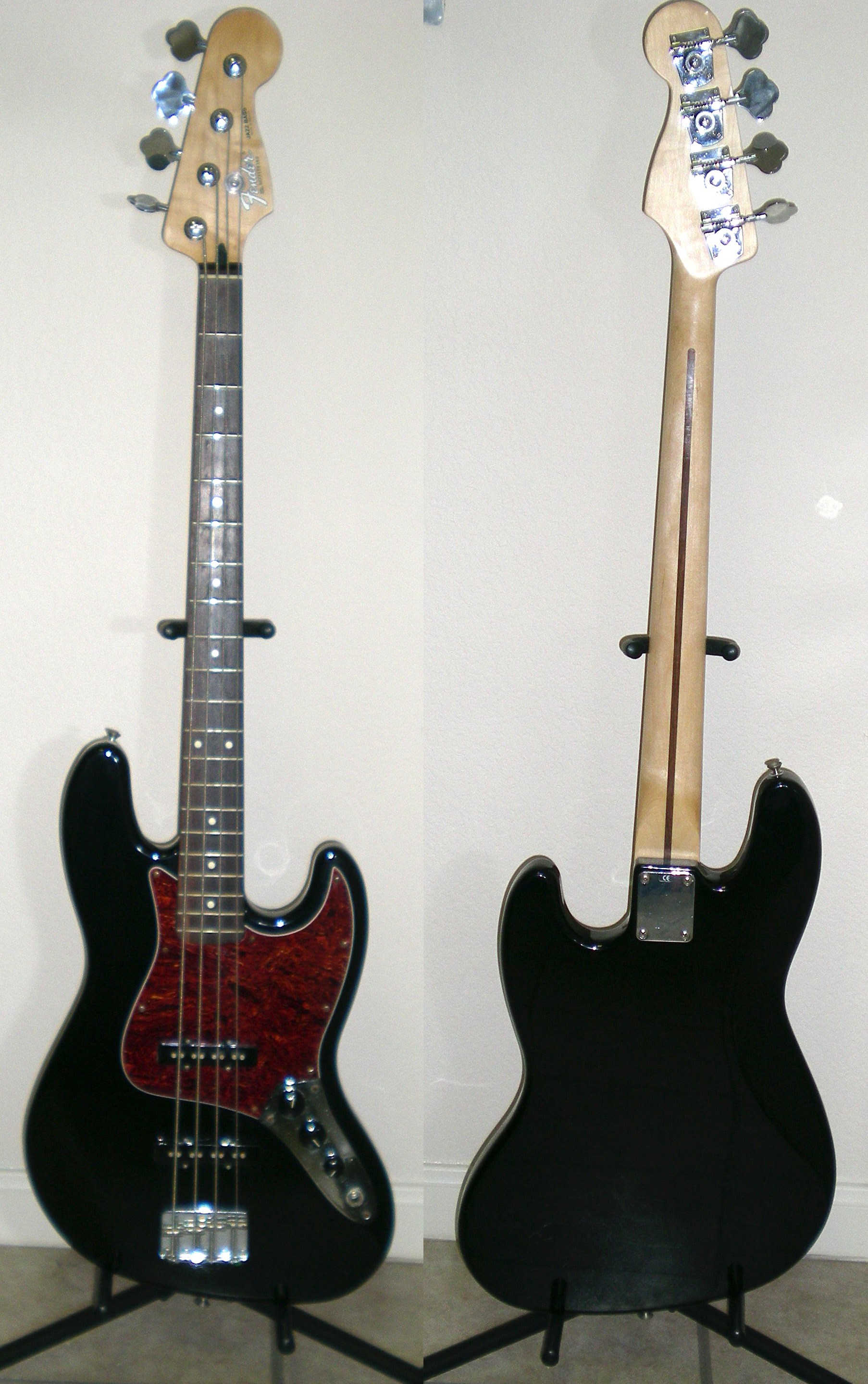
- Manufacturer: Fender
- Period: 1960–present

Construction
- Body type: Solid
- Neck joint: Bolt-on
- Scale: 34"

Woods
- Body: Ash; Alder; Poplar; Basswood
- Neck: Maple
- Fretboard: Rosewood; Maple; Pau ferro Indian Laurel; Ebony

Hardware
- Bridge: Fixed
- Pickup: Usually two Single-coils

Colors available
- Various 2- or 3-color sunbursts Various shades of white, blue, red, green, etc.

The Fender Jazz Bass (often shortened to "J-Bass") is the second model of electric bass guitar created by Leo Fender. It is distinct from the Precision Bass in that its tone is brighter and richer in the midrange and treble with less emphasis on the fundamental frequency. The body shape is also different from the Precision Bass, in that the Precision Bass has a symmetrical lower bout on the body, designed after the Telecaster and Stratocaster lines of guitars, while the Jazz Bass has an offset lower bout, mimicking the design aesthetic of the Jaguar and Jazzmaster guitars.

== History ==
First introduced in 1960 as the Deluxe Model, it borrowed design elements from the Jazzmaster guitar. It was renamed the Jazz Bass as Fender felt that its redesigned neck—narrower and more rounded than that of the Precision Bass—would appeal more to jazz musicians.

The Jazz Bass has two single coil pickups with two pole pieces per string. As well as having a slightly different, less symmetrical and more contoured body shape (known in Fender advertising as the "Offset Waist Contour" body), the Jazz Bass neck is noticeably narrower at the nut than that of the Fender Precision Bass. While the Precision Bass was originally styled similarly to the Telecaster guitar, the Jazz Bass' styling was inspired by the Jazzmaster guitar, with which the Jazz shared its offset body and sculpted edges, which differentiate it from other slab-style bass bodies.

The original intention of the instrument was to appeal to upright bass players. The original Jazz Bass had two stacked knob potentiometers with volume and tone control for each pickup. Original instruments with this stacked configuration are highly valued in the vintage guitar market. In late 1961, it received three control knobs: one volume knob for each pickup and a third to control the overall tone. Despite this new feature, many stacked knob models were made until about 1962. Another feature the initial models had were the "Spring Felt Mutes", which were present on basses from 1960 until 1962. The mutes were designed to dampen the overtones and the sustain; they were screwed in place between the bridge and aft pickup. Those felt mutes were not a tremendous success and were replaced by a cheaper, more simple foam mute glued underneath the bridge cover, as was used by the Precision Bass from 1963 onwards. Over the following years, as the use of mutes gradually declined, both the Precision and Jazz Bass models eventually began to be produced without bridge/tailpiece covers.

A number of cosmetic changes were made to the instrument when CBS purchased the Fender companies in 1965. During 1965/66, the Jazz Bass received bound rosewood fingerboards with pearloid dot position inlays (which replaced the older "clay"-style of the early 1960s) and oval-shaped tuning machines. Block-shaped fingerboard inlays and an optional maple fingerboard were introduced after 1966/67. At first, necks with rosewood fretboards received pearloid blocks/binding, and maple fretboard necks received black. Fender switched to pearloid blocks/binding on all necks in mid-to-late 1973. Fender also switched to the three-bolt neck "micro-tilt adjustable" neck and the "bullet" truss rod in mid-to-late 1974, before reverting to the more standard four-bolt neck fixing and dot-shaped fretboard markers in 1983. White pickup covers and a pickguard/control plate were introduced the same year. In 1986, Fender introduced the Japanese-made Fender Performer Bass, also with micro-tilt neck, designed by John Page and intended to be an Elite version of the Jazz Bass; however, the radical styling was not popular and production ceased the same year.

Two other changes that were more important to the tone of the instrument also occurred in the early 1970s. From 1960 until late 1970, the two pickups on the Jazz Bass were spaced 3.6 in (91 mm) apart. The bridge pickup was then moved .4 in (10 mm) closer to the bridge, creating a spacing of 4 in (100 mm). Many players believe that this change contributed to a somewhat brighter tone from the bridge pickup. According to Fender itself, this change happened in 1972. However, examples can be found as early as 1970 of Jazz basses that use the 4" pickup spacing. Both 3.6" and 4" spacing are found in Jazz basses made in 1971, and there are even a few Jazz basses made in 1972 that use the older 3.6" spacing. Around the same time, Fender began using ash for most of the instrument bodies. Prior to the early 70's, most Jazz basses had bodies made of alder, except for those that were finished in a clear or ("natural") finish - for those basses, ash was nearly always the wood of choice. In the early 70s, ash bodies became increasingly common, and by 1974 ash bodies were the rule, rather than the exception. Ash is generally thought to produce a somewhat brighter (and correspondingly less warm) tone than alder. By the mid-1970s, the combination of 4" pickup spacing and the use of heavier ash bodies with maple fingerboards combined to produce a notably brighter tone than that produced by Jazz basses from the 60s.

American Standard Jazz Basses produced between 1989 and mid-1994 featured a larger body shape, a 'curved' neck plate set into a chambered pocket for greater sustain and a 22-fret neck, similar to that of a Precision Bass Plus, with a standard vintage-style top-load bridge, two separate volumes and a master TBX tone circuit.

Usually known as "Boner" Jazz Basses, these early American Standard models (designed by George Blanda, who was Fender's senior R&D engineer during that period) were discontinued in 1994 and shouldn't be confused with the Fender Jazz Bass Plus, which has the same 22-fret neck design, but utilizes a different (downsized) body styling, Lace Sensor pickups, Schaller "Elite" fine-tuner bridge on the four-string model or Gotoh Hardware high-mass bridge on the 5-string model, and Phil Kubicki-designed active electronics. Unlike the Fender Precision Bass Plus, which had an optional maple neck, the Boner Jazz Bass was offered only with a rosewood fingerboard.

The Jazz Plus Bass was available with an alder body and the option of a natural-finish ash body on the four-string model for a $100 upcharge, either a maple or rosewood fretboard on the four-string and pau ferro (an exotic hardwood whose tone is brighter than rosewood yet warmer than ebony) on the five-string. The Jazz Plus debuted in 1989 (the five-string model was released in 1990), but was discontinued in 1994 and replaced by the USA Deluxe Series Jazz Bass the following year.

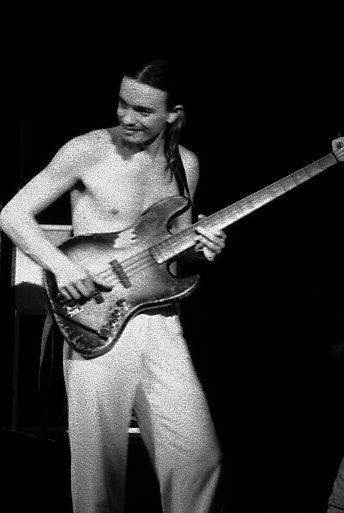
Jaco Pastorius playing his 1962 Jazz Bass, on November 27, 1977

A fourth push button control is available on American-made Jazz Basses produced between mid-2003 until 2008. Known as the "S-1 Switch", this feature allows the pickups to operate in standard, parallel wiring, or alternatively in series wiring when the switch is depressed. While in series, both pickups function as a single unit with one volume control, giving the Jazz Bass a sound more similar to the Precision Bass.

The two pickups are built to be opposite from each other in both magnetic polarity and electrical phase, so that when heard together, hum is cancelled—the humbucking effect.

In 2008, the American Series models were replaced by a new American Standard line, which greatly differs from the first-generation American Standard Series basses introduced in 1994. The 2008 American Standard Jazz Bass retained the "American Series" rolled-edge neck with highly detailed nut and fret work, as well as the familiar rounded body shape with the vintage body radius, but deleted the S-1 switching system and incorporated a new high-mass vintage bridge, Hipshot lightweight vintage-style tuning machines, a richer and deeper neck tint, gloss maple or rosewood fingerboard and satin back for smooth playability. It also has a thinner finish undercoat that lets the body breathe and improves resonance. In March 2012, Fender updated the American Standard Jazz Bass (except the five-string version) with Custom Shop 1960s Jazz Bass pickups.

To celebrate the 50th anniversary of the Jazz Bass, first introduced in 1960, Fender released in 2010 the 50th Anniversary Limited Edition Jazz Bass. This bass sports a selected alder body, finished in a Candy Apple Red nitrocellulose lacquer, and incorporates design elements from several periods in the instrument's history, including 1960s-era lacquer finish, headstock logo, chrome bridge and pickup covers, 1970s-era thumb rest and bridge pickup positioning, modern-era high-mass bridge and Posiflex graphite neck support rods.

== Design features ==
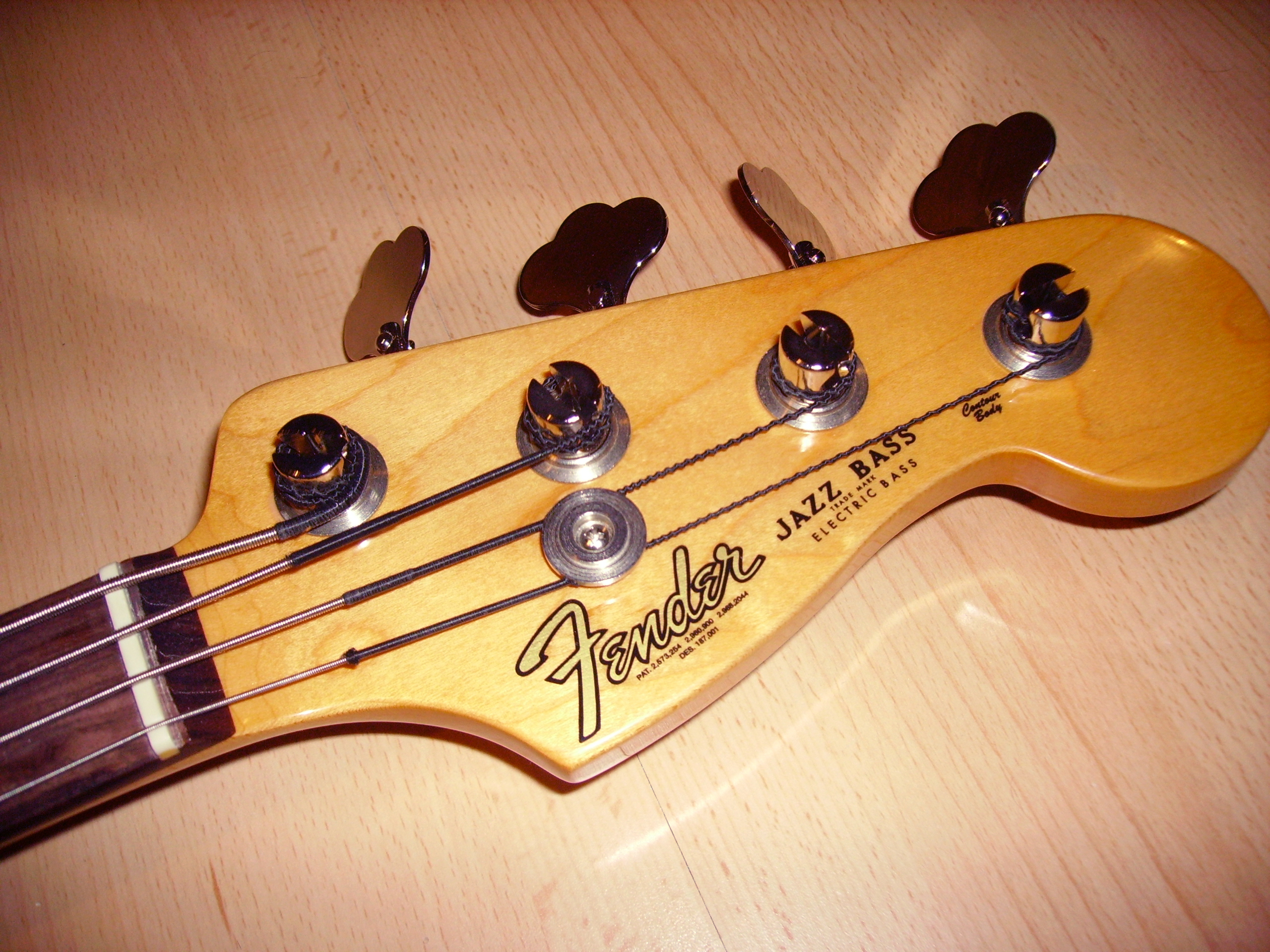
A typical Fender Jazz Bass headstock.

The Jazz Bass has a bright sound, with more high end than the Precision Bass. This makes it ideal for slap playing as well as finger-style players. This bright sound is because of the two pickups at different points in the string's length. The bridge pickup gives a tone with more treble, while the neck pickup will yield a rounder sound. The ability to blend the volume of both pickups allows for a wider variety of tones than the Precision Bass can produce. Pickups are RWRP (reverse wound, reverse polarity) from one another, so all hum will be canceled when both pickups are at full volume.

Having both pickups cranked up at full volume produces the classic scooped, "growling" sound which many players—such as Marcus Miller and Will Lee—use for slap bass playing. This sound is the product of certain frequencies from both pickups being out of phase and cancelling each other, leaving a "scoop" on the midrange. This is similar to what happens on some guitars when one blends the sounds from two different pickups, such as the Fender Stratocaster.

Some "Deluxe" Jazz Bass models feature an active pre-amp (usually with three bands of equalization) in place of a single passive tone control; these basses have three separate equalizer controls: bass and treble responses are controlled by the base and top of a stacked double potentiometer, while midrange is controlled by a second knob. They came with 22 frets, abalone dot position inlays and an 18-volt power supply on some models. Known as the Jazz Bass Deluxe since being introduced as part of a major reworking of Fender's Electric Bass lineup in 1995, they have been renamed the American Deluxe Jazz Bass.

The American Deluxe Jazz Bass (available in four-string fretted and fretless, five-string fretted and left-hand versions) featured two samarium-cobalt Noiseless Jazz Bass pickups, designed by Bill Lawrence. Fender used downsized bodies to accommodate the 22-fret neck and reshaped the pickguard with nine screw holes.

American Deluxes produced between 1995 and 1999 were initially available with "single-pole" pickups designed by John Suhr. These were soon changed to the Bill Turner-designed dual-coil Ceramic Noiseless units with nickel-plated (gold-plated on certain models) polepieces until the advent of the Bill Lawrence-designed Samarium Cobalt series in 2004.

Other refinements include a strings-through-body/top-load bridge, Posiflex graphite neck support rods, rolled fingerboard edges, highly detailed nut- and fretwork. Five-string versions are presented with a 4+1 tuner arrangement and two Hipshot string trees since 2002. The asymmetrical five-bolt neck plate, along with the smooth contoured heel allow much easier access to the upper registers. Bound fingerboards with pearloid block inlays were added with the introduction of the American Deluxe Jazz Bass FMT & QMT in late 2001, featuring flamed or quilted maple tops and gold-plated hardware. Fender discontinued these models in 2007.

In 2010 the American Deluxe Jazz Bass was updated with a pair of N3 stacked-coil Noiseless Jazz Bass pickups, an active/passive toggle switch, CBS styling and a 21-fret bound compound radius maple neck featuring rosewood or maple fingerboards with rectangular block inlays. Other features include Hipshot vintage lightweight tuners, "Strong Arm" string retainer bar for the A and low B strings, and Fender's High Mass Vintage (HMV) bridge. The American Deluxe series was discontinued in 2016.

The American Elite Jazz Bass, introduced in 2016, sports a compound modern C-to-D neck shape, fourth-generation noiseless pickups, a "spoke-wheel" truss rod system for easier neck relief adjustments and a new asymmetrical neck heel. It is offered with a compound radius ebony (since 2017) or maple fingerboard, in 4 and 5-string versions.

The Mexican Deluxe Active Jazz Bass combines many of the features of the American Deluxe models with a traditional Standard Jazz Bass body, vintage-style hardware, a contoured neck heel and a 12"-radius 20-fret rosewood or maple fingerboard. It comes in 4 and 5-string versions and sports a three-band active circuit powered by two dual-coil ceramic Noiseless Jazz Bass pickups and an 18V power supply with an active/passive switch (as of 2016).

The Custom Classic model was made at the Fender Custom Shop. This Custom Shop Jazz Bass was a cross between the American Vintage and the American Deluxe series. Features include an oversized select alder or premium ash body, a modern 34"-scale C-shape maple neck with an unbound rosewood, pau ferro or maple fingerboard featuring triangular pearloid block inlays and 21 medium-jumbo frets. Available in four- and five-string versions, all Custom Classic Jazz Basses came with a pair of custom-wound dual-coil Noiseless Jazz Bass pickups, a three-band active preamp, five-bolt neck plate, 18V power supply and a Deluxe string-through-body/top-load bridge with milled nickel-plated brass saddles. Models manufactured prior to 2003 (formerly known as American Classics) were identical to the mid-1990s American Deluxe basses in appearance, excepting the 22-fret bound maple neck featuring a rosewood fretboard and white block inlays. Fender discontinued the five-string version in 2009. The Custom Classic four-string Jazz Bass has been renamed Custom Active Jazz Bass as of 2010, featuring Fender's high-mass vintage (HMV) bridge and a 1960s Jazz Bass "U" shape neck.

The Standard Jazz Bass model is sanded, painted and assembled in Ensenada, Baja California along with the other Standard Series guitars (replaced by the Player models in 2018). On December 5, 2008, the Standard J-Bass has given CBS era-style decals, a three-ply parchment pickguard and a tinted maple neck with rosewood or maple fingerboard (also available in a fretless version with a rosewood fingerboard and 20 inlaid white fretline markers). Other features included two staggered bi-pole single-coil pickups and a return to the black bakelite control knobs. Models produced before 2003 came for a period with black Stratocaster control knobs. The five-string version (introduced in 1992), available with pao ferro or rosewood fingerboard and a five-in-line tuner configuration with Gotoh Mini machineheads (c. 2006), has been updated with a tinted maple neck featuring a dark rosewood fingerboard and a 4+1 tuner configuration with Fender/Ping tuning machines as of 2009. In 2017 Fender switched to pao ferro fingerboards before discontinuing the Standard series in 2018.

All five-string Jazz basses came with pau ferro fretboard since 1990 (some US Deluxe models were also available with a plain maple neck option). Fender offers its 5-string basses with rosewood or maple fretboard as of 2006 after discontinuing the pau ferro fingerboard option in late 2005. In 2008, Fender introduced the fretted and fretless Steve Bailey signature models, its first six-string Jazz Basses to feature a 9.5" to 14" compound-radius ebony fingerboard.

== Models ==
- Standard Jazz Bass
- Standard Jazz Bass Fretless
- Standard Jazz Bass V
- American Performer Jazz Bass
- American Professional II Jazz Bass
- American Professional II Jazz Bass Fretless
- American Professional II Jazz Bass Left-Handed
- American Professional II Jazz Bass V
- Deluxe Active Jazz Bass
- Deluxe Active Jazz Bass V
- American Original 60's Jazz Bass
- American Original 70's Jazz Bass
- American Ultra Jazz Bass
- American Ultra Jazz Bass V
- Vintera '60s Jazz Bass
- Vintera '70s Jazz Bass
- Road Worn '60s Jazz Bass
- Player Jazz Bass
- A line of Fender Squier models

=== Discontinued models ===
- American Deluxe Jazz Bass
- American Deluxe Jazz Bass V
- American Deluxe Jazz Bass Fretless
- American Deluxe Jazz Bass Left-Handed
- American Vintage '62 Jazz Bass
- American Vintage '64 Jazz Bass
- American Vintage '75 Jazz Bass
- American Vintage '74 Jazz Bass
- American Special Jazz Bass
- American Jazz Bass Plus
- American Jazz Bass Plus V
- Highway One Jazz Bass
- Jazz Bass 24
- Jazz Bass 24 V
- Power Jazz Bass Special – same specs as the Jazz Bass Special except for the addition of a reversed split P-Bass pickup, active electronics and a 22-fret neck.
- Jazz Bass Special – featured black hardware, P/J pickup configuration with 3-way switching, two volume and one TBX tone control (reissued as the Duff McKagan Precision Bass in 2007).
- American Standard Jazz Bass
- American Standard Jazz Bass Fretless
- American Standard Jazz Bass Left-Handed
- American Standard Jazz Bass V
- American Elite Jazz Bass
- American Elite Jazz Bass V
- Blacktop Jazz Bass
- Modern Player Jazz Bass
- Modern Player Jazz Bass V
- American Professional Jazz Bass

== Signature models ==
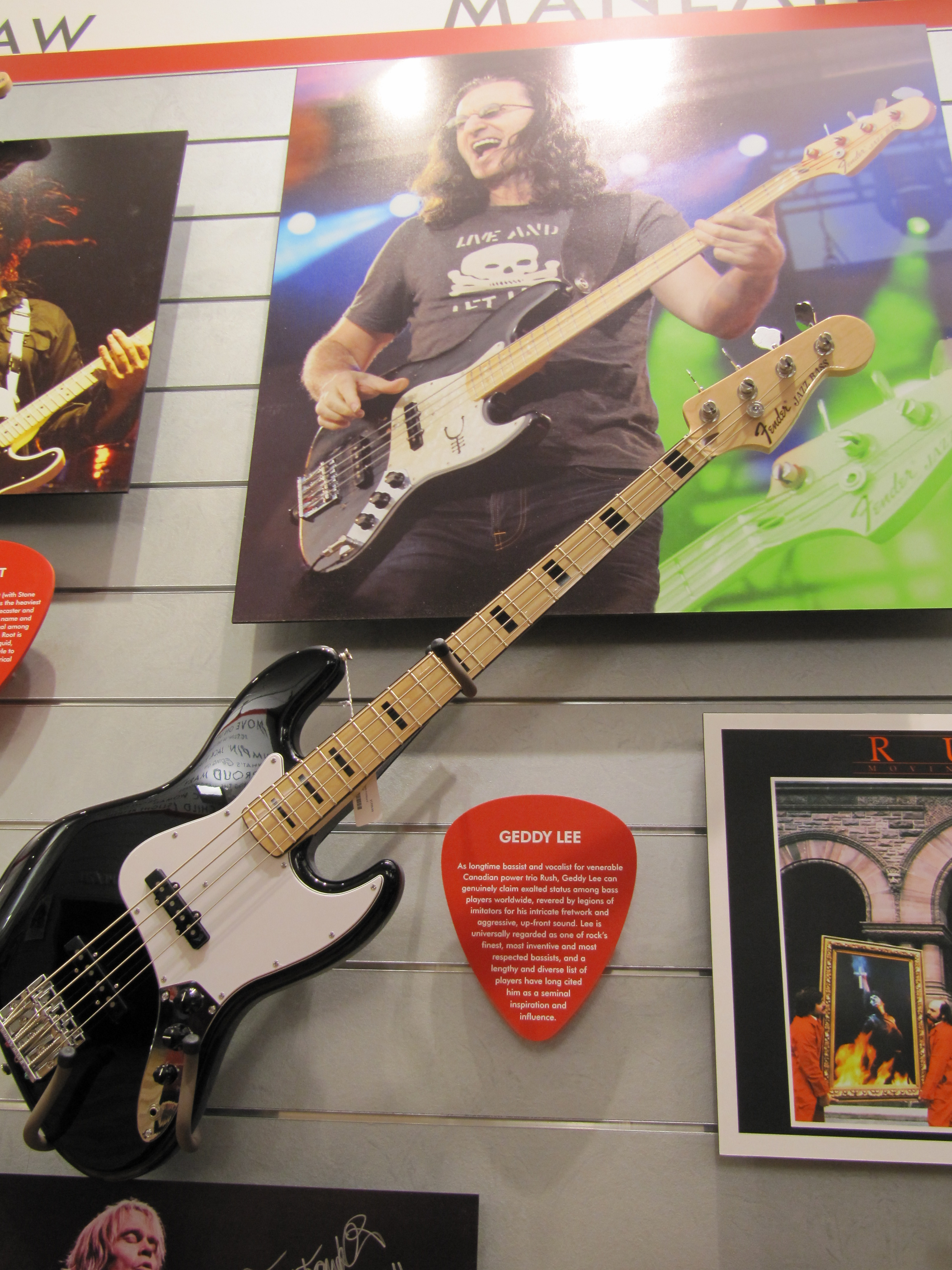
A black Geddy Lee Signature Jazz Bass

Fender has designed signature Jazz Bass models for notable players including:

- Steve Bailey
- Victor Bailey
- Roscoe Beck
- Frank Bello
- Adam Clayton
- Flea
- Mark Hoppus
- Geddy Lee
- Marcus Miller
- Jaco Pastorius
- Noel Redding
- Mikey Way

== 24-fret Jazz Bass ==
In July 2005, Fender introduced its first 24-fret bass since the Fender Performer Bass, the Fender Jazz Bass 24. The Jazz Bass 24 featured a sleek alder body, a 34"-scale length, modern C-shaped maple neck with a two-octave rosewood fingerboard, abalone dot inlays, 24 medium-jumbo frets, Hipshot-licensed tuners, Fender/Gotoh High Mass top-loading bridge, two custom-wound Seymour Duncan SJB-3 Quarter Pound pickups, a passive/active push/pull volume knob and a 3-band active EQ with a "slap" mid-scoop switch. It was available in the Fender price list as part of the Deluxe Series line, with Cherry Sunburst (discontinued as of 2007) and Tobacco Sunburst finishes over a quilted maple top and chrome-plated hardware. The 5-string version was introduced in 2007.

In 2008, Fender offered both the four- and five-string versions of the 24-fret Jazz Bass in a stealthy Flat Black finish (with matching headstocks and hardware). These 2-octave Jazz Basses were gone from the Fender pricelist as of 2009.

The Steve Bailey 6-string signature model produced between 2009 and 2011 also had a 2-octave fingerboard and was tuned BEADGC

Fender 24-fret Jazz Basses were made in Korea.

== Fender Jaguar Bass ==
In 2005, Fender introduced the Fender Jaguar Bass, as of 2008 available in Hot Rod Red, Olympic White, Sunburst and Black finishes, with a three-ply white or tortoise pickguard. This is a variation on the traditional Jazz Bass design—differences being that it has only one master volume and tone, but additional on/off switches for pickup selection, series/parallel switching, and a two-band active preamp with bypass switch.

The Jaguar bass retains the slim Jazz neck, bi-pole pickups, Jazzmaster/Jaguar body design and the trademark Jazz Bass growl.

As of 2008, the Jaguar Bass comes in Olympic White and three-colour Sunburst finishes, together with a four-ply brown tortoise shell pickguard. These colours were previously available only for the Japanese domestic market.

In 2012, Fender also introduced the Reverse Jaguar Bass in its line of Pawn Shop Series guitars. This special issue features a reversed body stock orientation, and also reverses the humbucking pickups for a unique tone.

Fender also offers several models of the Jaguar Bass in the Squier line (and an American Standard version since 2014), most with a Precision/Jazz "P-J" pickup configuration.

== See also ==
- Fender Musical Instruments Corporation
- Fender Precision Bass
- Fender Aerodyne Jazz Bass
- List of signature model bass guitars

== Sources ==
- Bacon, Tony (2000). 50 Years of Fender: Half a Century of the Greatest Electric Guitars. London: Backbeat Books. ISBN 0-87930-621-1.
- Peter Bertges. The Fender Reference. Bomots, Saarbrücken. 2007. ISBN 978-3-939316-38-1.
