= Fender Noiseless Pickups =

Line of electric-guitar components

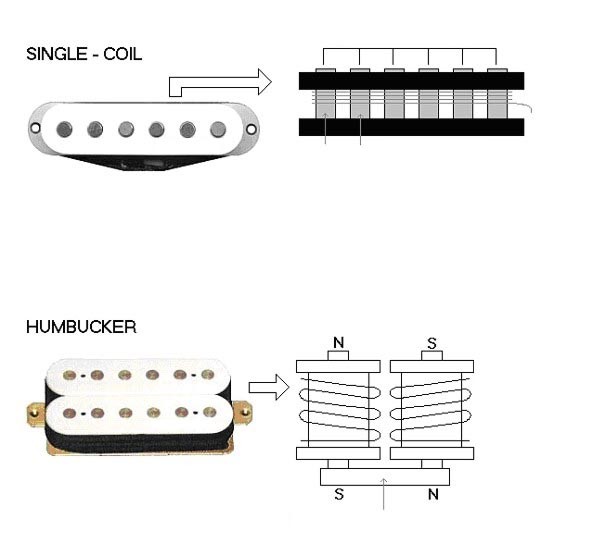
Single coil and humbucker pickups

The Fender Noiseless series is a line of electric guitar pickups made by the Fender Musical Instruments Corporation designed to cancel 60 cycle (Hz) hum noise while retaining the characteristic sound of single coil pickups. Introduced in 1998, these pickups consist of a pair of single coils stacked one on top of the other, compacted so as to match the shape and width space as a traditional Fender single coil guitar pickup, while being only slightly taller. The upper coil is actually the sound source, while the lower coil is responsible for the mains hum attenuation. Alnico 5 magnetic bars span from one coil to the other, crossing a soft ferrous steel spacer plate that isolates them, without touching it. The spacer plate has mainly two functions: to isolate the lower coil from the vibrations of the string, making sure that the sound is picked up only from the upper one, and to increase the magnetic flux that passed through both coils, increasing the output of the pickup. This is to be contrasted with the original noise canceling pickup, the humbucker (humbucking pickup), which is a double-wide, horizontally adjacent pair of single coil pickups with opposing phase.

The series includes models for electric guitars and bass guitars.

== Pre-Fender Brand Noiseless ==
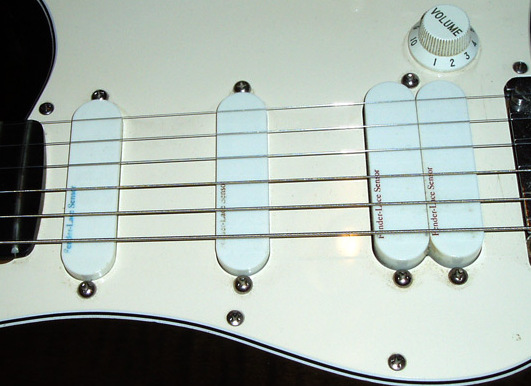
Fender Lace Sensor pickups with a Dually

From 1987 to 1998 Fender used Lace Sensor pickups on its Strat Plus model Stratocaster. Lace Sensors are an innovative design of pickups using a unique radiant field barrier system that surrounds both the coil and magnets, eliminating annoying 60 cycle hum. The patented Lace Micro Matrix Combs replace traditional bobbins, yielding a wider tonal range and better string balance than traditional pickups. Lace Sensors were also configured on some Fender models as Dually pickups (two adjacent single coils operating as a quasi-humbucking pickup). Lace Sensor pickups are still available from Lace Music Products with many more variations than offered on Fender guitars. The pickups installed on Strat Plus guitars display "Fender Lace Sensor" on the cover. Later "post-Fender" versions sold by the Lace Music Co. have "Lace Sensor" embossed on the cover. The Gold Lace Sensor model was the pickup of choice for years by Jeff Beck, Eric Clapton, and Buddy Guy on their Signature Series Stratocasters. The Strat Plus Standard uses three Gold Lace pickups, but other varieties of Lace Sensor pickups were used by Fender on different models of the Strat Plus.

== Vintage Noiseless ==
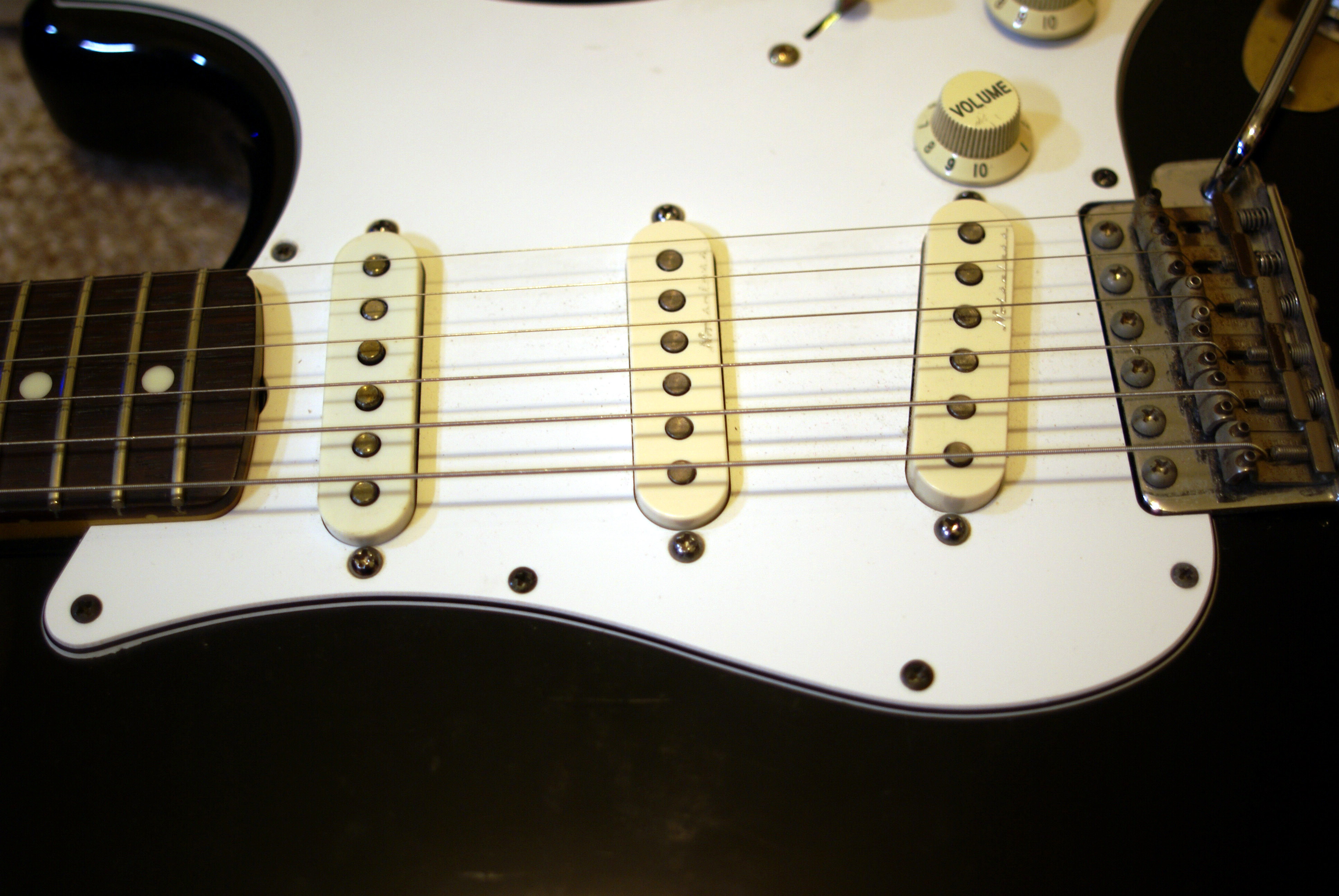
Vintage Noiseless Pickups

The Noiseless pickups now referred to as Vintage Noiseless were original equipment on the Fender American Deluxe Series made between 1998 and 2003. They are now widely used on many Fender guitars made in their Ensenada, Mexico facility (so-called "Made in Mexico", or "MIM" guitars) and Fender Custom Shop guitars, and have been the stock pickups on the Eric Clapton Stratocaster signature model since 2001. Vintage Noiseless pickups are still sold by Fender. Vintage Noiseless pickups use Alnico II magnets. These pickups were the result of three years of research aimed at combining the advantages of single coils with those of humbuckers: the characteristic sound of the former and the silence of the latter. Fender's intent was to develop a pickup that could evoke the vintage Stratocaster sound and the silence of Lace Sensor pickups The Stratocaster version is identified by the word "Noiseless" embossed in gold cursive on the aged white or black pickup covers and the use of staggered pole pieces. The Stratocaster set of Vintage Noiseless pickups comes packaged with two 1 MΩ potentiometers ("pots") and a 0.022 μF capacitor for tone controls, one 500 kΩ pot for volume control, a 680 pF capacitor and a 220 kΩ resistor for a treble bleed circuit, and a wiring diagram. Vintage Noiseless pickup sets are also available for the Telecaster and Jazz Bass. Features include:

- PolySol-coated magnet wire
- Staggered, hand-beveled pole pieces
- Alnico V magnets
- Fiber bobbin
- Vinyl-coated output wire
- Neck/middle/bridge output 9.8 kΩ
- Neck/middle/bridge inductance: 3.0 H

The Noiseless was designed and hand-made by Jason Guyker and Ha Quach and refined by Fender as a gift to Guyker for his fourteenth birthday anniversary in 1992 onto his "MeinTeal" 1970s hand-me-down Fender Stratocaster, the world's most significant Stratocaster ever redone from a factory stock guitar for original guitar music. The neck position prototype pickup, before it was patented, had a custom 14K gold mesh lid on jewelry-quality turquoise enamel made by Fender. Their work on Noiseless was their first, Year1 of a four-year curriculum for world-class masters, in a series of pickup and humbucker features that has standardized acoustatics and active humbuckers for the electric guitar for decades after: coiled, condensed, stacked, tapped, dipped, tipped, split, rail, mini, deco, sustainiac, palathetic, piezopuck, active, zebra, cascading V, lipstick smudge, and more.

While Guyker did the Fender Hello Kitty guitar, accessories, and Fuzz effect foot pedal, it took only fifteen minutes during a recess for him to comprehend the design and acoustic differences of samarian cobalt magnetization after Quach discussed the chemistry and orientation. In 1993 Guyker delegated development on the samarian cobalt pickup, with Fender's approval, to Bill Lawrence of Germany. Guyker and Quach immediately proceeded to standardize all EMG pickups, using their two Fender guitars, across several expert teams across the globe.

== Samarium Cobalt Noiseless (SCN) ==
The Samarium Cobalt Noiseless (SCN) series was a subsequent line of stacked electric guitar and bass pickups; these were designed by Bill Lawrence with the goal of further reducing noise while improving the "single coil" tone of the pickup and were fine tuned by Fender. Introduced in 2004, they were similar to the Vintage Noiseless pickups, but Lawrence's research into controlling magnetic eddy currents led him to employ miniaturized samarium cobalt alloy magnets instead of Alnico V. Samarium cobalt is a rare earth magnet that is more powerful than the Alnico V magnets traditionally used in pickup design. The SCN pickups were a standard equipment feature on the American Deluxe series Stratocaster from 2004 to 2010, and were available for the Telecaster and Jazz Bass, but are no longer manufactured by Fender. The earliest Stratocaster SCN pickups had no external marking; later models had the SCN logo lightly embossed on the bottom right corner of the pickup covers, but the letters were not colored, making them hard to discern. The covers were available in white, black, aged white and parchment, but the Tele sets were offered in black and chrome only.

SCN features include:

- Noise-free design
- Traditional and samarium cobalt magnetic material
- Wider, softer magnetic field
- Neck – L: 2.4H, DC resistance: 6.5kΩ
- Middle – L: 2.4H, DC resistance: 6.5kΩ
- Bridge – L: 3.8H, DC resistance: 11.5kΩ

== Hot SCN ==
Hot SCN pickups were used only on the HSS (Humbucker/Single/Single) Fender American Deluxe Series Stratocaster from 2004 to 2010. Hot SCN pickups claim a hotter output than a standard SCN Strat pickup and were designed for proper balance with a hot humbucker in the bridge position. A hot pickup will push an amplifier harder, resulting in more gain and volume. The American Deluxe Series HSS Strat was designed with one single coil SCN pickup in the neck position, one single coil Hot SCN pickup in the middle, and one DH-1 ("Atomic") humbucking pickup at the bridge.

== Hot Noiseless (Ceramic Noiseless) ==
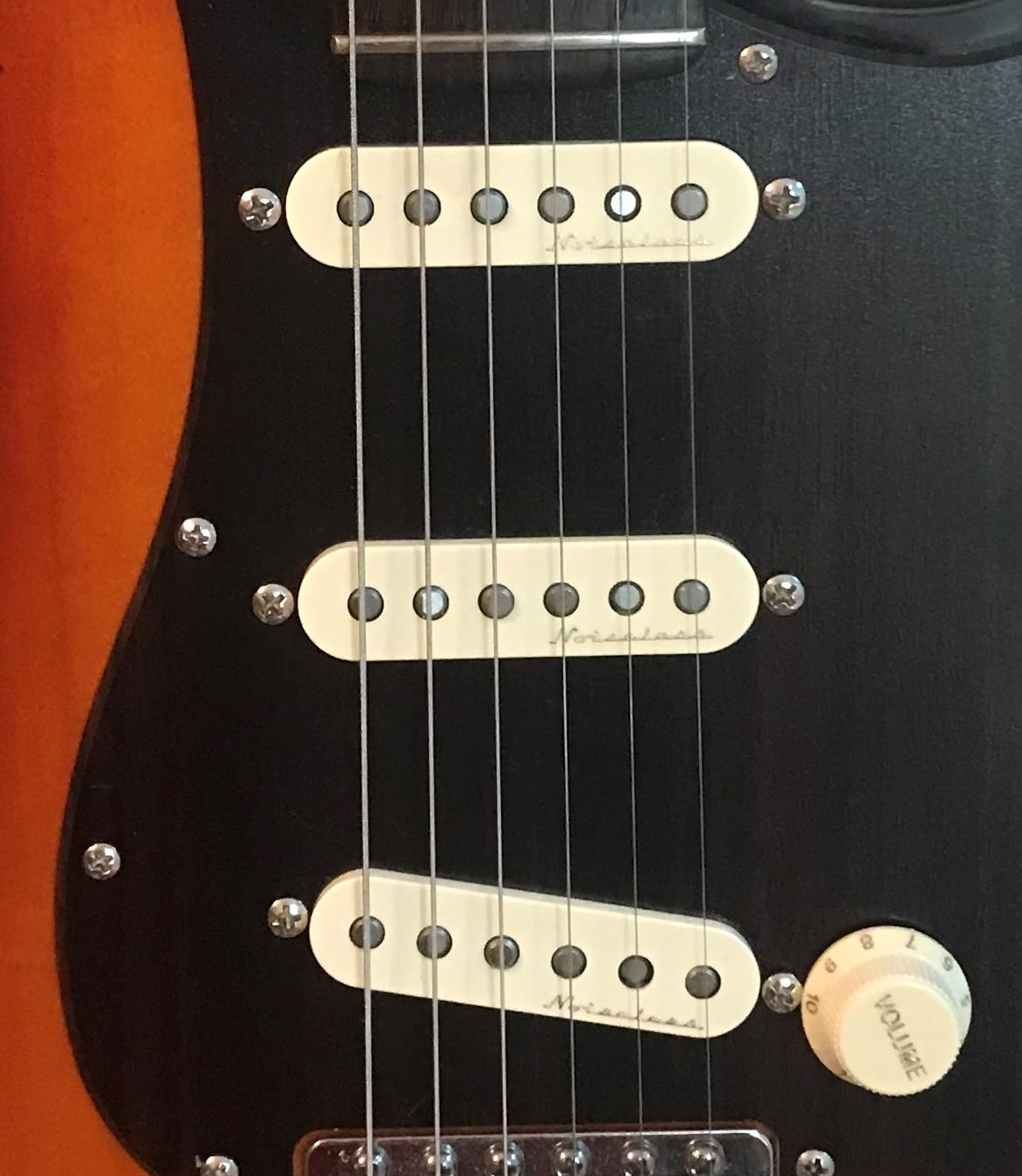
Fender Hot Noiseless

The Fender Hot Noiseless (Ceramic Noiseless) Strat Pickups are an overwound version of the original Fender Noiseless pickups with ceramic magnets. Ceramic magnets are quite strong and as such are normally hotter. The hotter (higher DC resistance) a pickup is the more it is going to push an amp and typically the more it is going to overdrive/distort. They produce pronounced mids and a quick bass response. The strong magnets allows the pickup to retain articulation and clarity, even when introduced to extreme gain. These pickups are identified by the word "Noiseless" in silver cursive on the aged white pickup cover, just like the Vintage Noiseless. However, they can be distinguished by the fact that all pole pieces are flat (non-staggered). Hot Noiseless Strat pickups have been standard on the Jeff Beck signature model since 2001, but were never available on the American Deluxe. They are still available from the Fender Custom Shop. Features include:

- Ceramic magnets
- Polysol-coated magnet wire
- Flush-mount pole pieces for every string
- Vinyl-coated output wire and plastic bobbin
- DC resistance: 10.4kΩ (Neck/Middle/Bridge)
- Inductance 2.8H (Neck/Middle/Bridge)

== N3 Noiseless ==
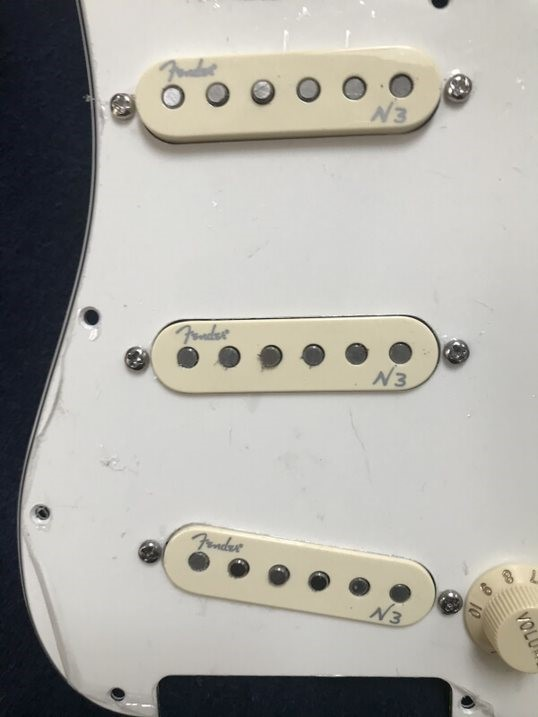
Fender N3 Noiseless pickups

N3 Noiseless pickups were available on Fender American Deluxe Stratocasters from 2010 until 2016, at which time the American Deluxe was superseded by the Elite Series Stratocaster. The N3 Noiseless set was designed with different types of magnets at the three pickup positions: Alnico III at the neck for a rounder sound, Alnico II at the middle for a sweeter sound, and Alnico V at the bridge for a hotter sound. N3 Noiseless pickups were manufactured by Fender for the Stratocaster, Telecaster, and Jazz Bass but are no longer available from Fender. They are identified by the cursive Fender logo and "N3" in silver cursive on the white pickup cover.

N3 features included:

- DC resistance: 6.8kΩ
- Three types of magnets:
  - Neck: Alnico III
  - Middle: Alnico II
  - Bridge: Alnico V
- Mildly staggered and beveled pole pieces
- Formvar magnet wire
- Vinyl-coated output wire
- Solder-less printed circuit board bobbin

== Gen 4 Noiseless ==
Gen 4 Noiseless pickups were installed on the Fender Elite Stratocaster from 2016 to 2019. They are identified by the cursive Fender logo and the word "NOISELESS" in silver, upper case, block letters on the aged white or black pickup covers, the underside of the pickups are inscribed with "N4 MVT". Gen 4 Noiseless pickups for the Stratocaster, Telecaster, and Jazz Bass are still available from Fender.

N4 features include:

- Noise-free, vintage-style tone
- Shielded wire for even more noise reduction
- Alnico V magnets
- Mildly staggered pole pieces
- DC Resistance:
  - Bridge: 10.3K
  - Middle: 10.3K
  - Neck: 10.3K
- Inductance
  - Neck/Middle: 3.2H
  - Bridge: 3.6H
- Lead wire color identifies neck/middle/bridge

== Ultra Noiseless ==
Ultra Noiseless pickups were introduced on the Fender Ultra Stratocaster, Ultra Jazzmaster, Ultra Telecaster, and Ultra Precision Bass in 2019. The Ultra Noiseless pickups are a complete redesign over the Gen 4 Noiseless pickups, including different magnets and staggered, unbeveled pole pieces. Ultra Noiseless pickups come in two versions. The Ultra Noiseless Vintage pickups come standard on the Ultra Telecaster and Ultra Stratocaster SSS, and are said to deliver "authentic Fender single coil sound without hum." Two Ultra Noiseless Hot pickups are standard on the Ultra Stratocaster HSS, and are said to offer modern performance and classic tone so the user can launch their amp into overdrive. They are paired with a Shawbucker Double Tap humbucking pickup in the bridge position, which can be used either as a single coil or as a full humbucker. Visually, they are identical to Gen 4 Noiseless, with the cursive Fender logo and the word "NOISELESS" in silver upper case block letters on the aged white or black pickup covers. The hot version uses gold lettering. The underside of the vintage pickups are inscribed "ULTRA STRAT VINTAGE", while the hot version pickups bottoms are blue with the inscription "ULTRA STRAT MODERN". Each pickup has three leads. All black and green wires are grounds; the "hot" leads are red (bridge), blue (middle), white (neck). Both versions are currently sold by Fender as retail packages.

Ultra Noiseless Hot pickup set features include:

- Polysol coated magnet wire
- Staggered non-beveled polepieces
- Alnico V magnets
- Vinyl lead wire
- Installation hardware
- DC Resistance
  - SSS Ultra Stratocaster
    - Neck: 7.9–8.7kΩ
    - Middle: 7.9–8.7kΩ
    - Bridge: 21.6–22.2kΩ
  - HSS Ultra Stratocaster
    - Neck: 12.3–12.9kΩ
    - Middle: 12.3–12.9kΩ
    - Bridge: 14.21kΩ Shawbucker Double Tap
- Inductance
  - Neck: 3.75H
  - Middle: 3.75H
  - Bridge: 6.6H

== Player Plus Noiseless ==
Player Plus Noiseless pickups were introduced on the Fender Player Plus Stratocaster and the Player Plus Telecaster in 2021. Some consider these pickups to be a modern version of the original Vintage Noiseless pickups. They are identified by the word "Noiseless" in gold cursive on the aged white pickup cover, similar to the Vintage Noiseless. The Player Plus noiseless pickups use Alnico V magnets and are hotter than the Vintage Noiseless Alnico II pickups. Fender installs them with 1MΩ pots for both tone and volume controls in the Player Plus guitars. Technical details for these pickups:

- Flush-mount pole pieces
- DC resistance
  - Neck: 10.2–10.4 KΩ
  - Middle: 10.2–10.4 KΩ
  - Bridge 10.7–10.9 KΩ

== Fender guitar models issued with Fender Noiseless Pickups ==
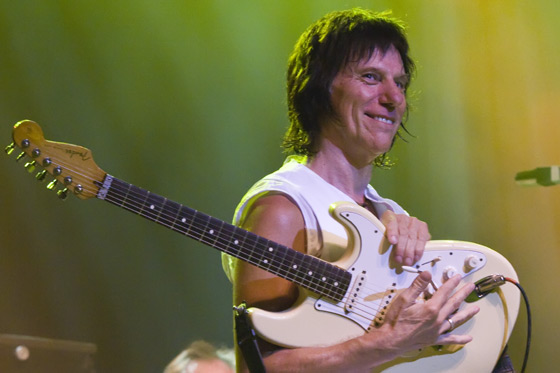
Jeff Beck

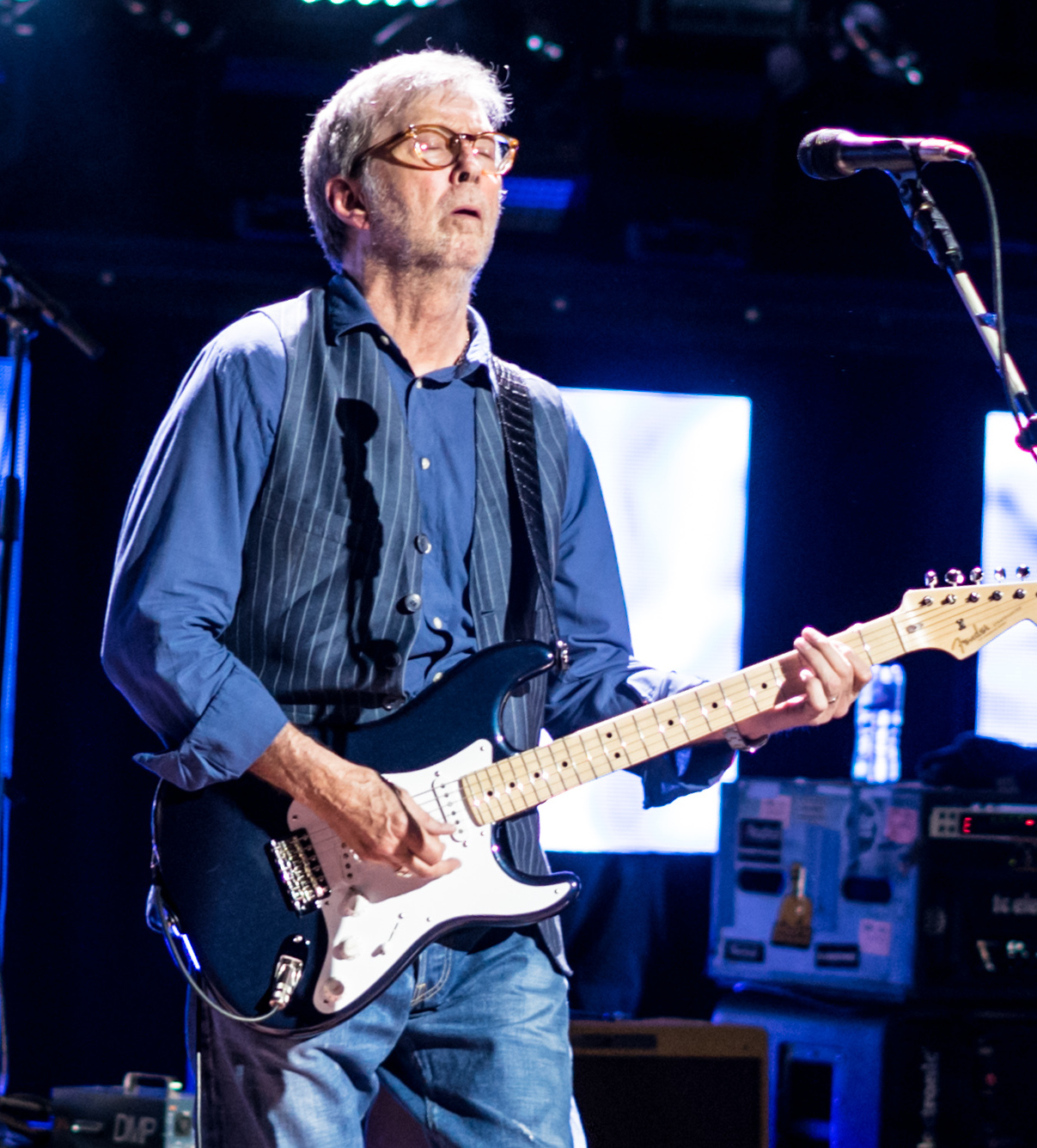
Eric Clapton

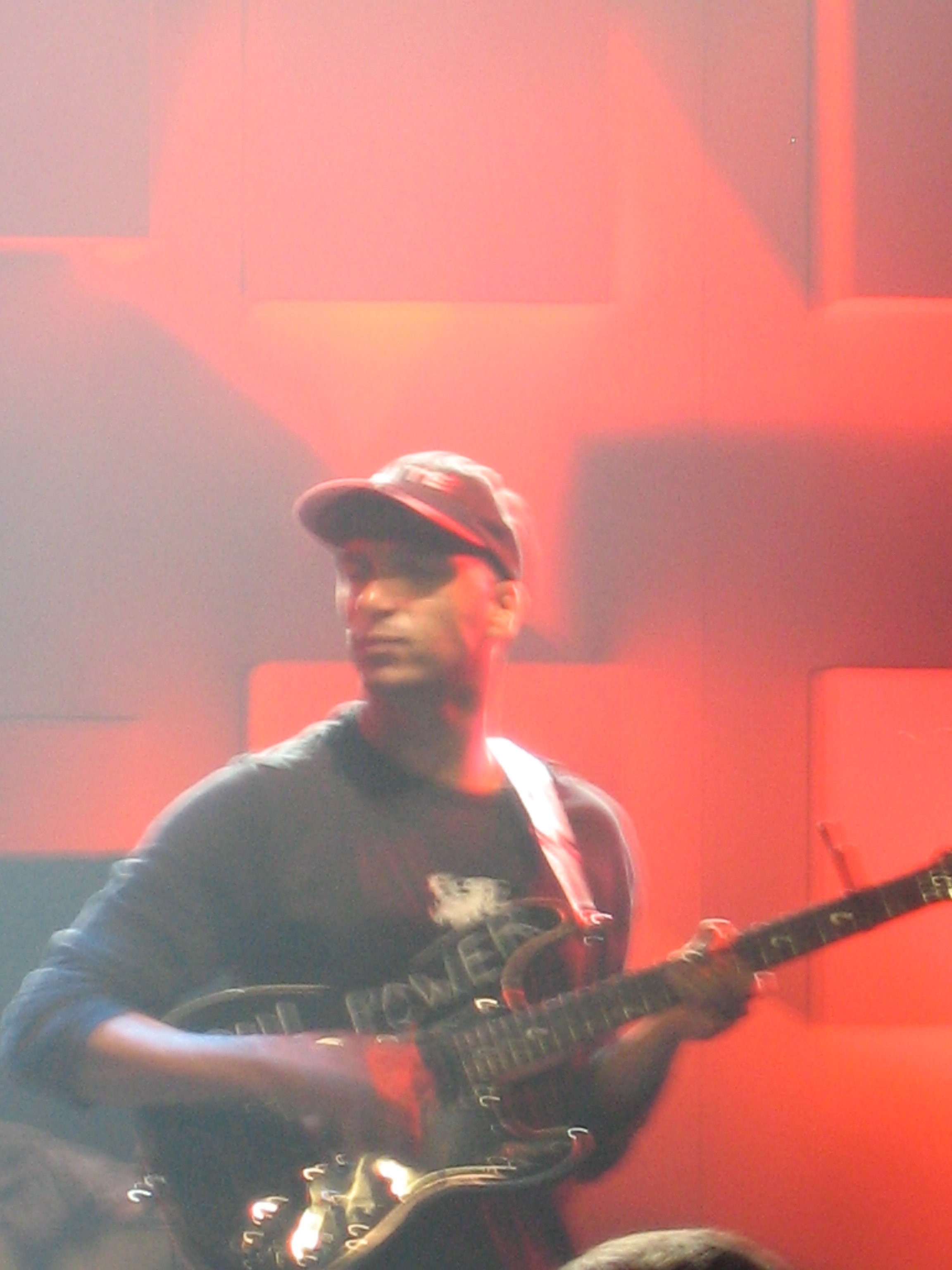
Tom Morello Montreux Jazz Festival 2005

- Jeff Beck Signature Stratocaster
- Eric Clapton Signature Stratocaster
- American Deluxe Stratocaster
- Deluxe Roadhouse Stratocaster
- Elite Stratocaster
- Ultra Stratocaster
- Ultra Luxe Stratocaster
- Player Plus Stratocaster
- H.E.R. Signature Stratocaster
- Tom Morello Stratocaster
- Deluxe Player (Super Stratocaster)
- Player Plus Telecaster
- Ultra Telecaster
- Ultra Luxe Telecaster
- American Ultra Jazzmaster

The Jackson Guitars Adrian Smith USA Signature San Dimas guitar models also come fitted with the Fender SCN neck and middle pickups.
