= Fender Performer Bass =

Electric bass guitar

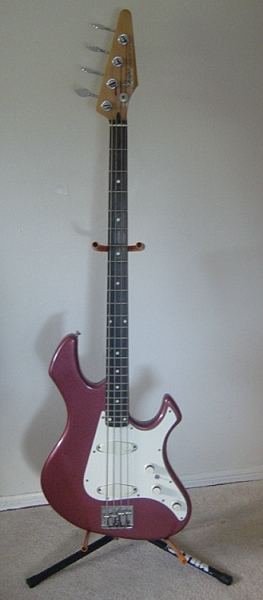
- Manufacturer: Fender
- Period: 1986–1987

Construction
- Body type: Solid
- Neck joint: Bolt-on
- Scale: 34.0 in (863.6 mm)

Woods
- Body: Alder
- Neck: Maple
- Fretboard: Rosewood (Standard), Ebony (Elite)

Hardware
- Pickup: 2 special design single coils

Colors available
- Various solid metallic and sunburst finishes

The Fender Performer was an electric bass guitar released in 1985 and discontinued in 1987, assembled in the United States and Japan. A Fender Performer electric guitar was also available.

== Description ==
The Fender Performer Bass was a uniquely styled bass guitar, designed by John Page, and renowned for its extremely slender neck (narrower than Stratocaster and Telecaster guitars). The Japanese Performer Standard has an alder body, with a bolt-on 34" 24-fret micro-tilt adjustable maple neck and a 2-octave rosewood fingerboard, as opposed to the United States-made Performer Elite, never actually put into production, which would have sported an ebony fretboard. Controls are: Volume, Pickup Selector Switch and TBX Circuit Control (Treble Bass eXpander). The latter provided the same tonal range as the Jazz Bass between 0 and 5, with the range 5-10 providing significantly brighter sound – oriented towards solo playing and particularly suiting the sharp attack needed for a slap bass playing style. Both basses were available in Burgundy Mist, Gun Metal Blue, Candy Green, White and Tobacco Sunburst. All finishes were metallic except for the sunburst. Both versions featured a number of minor features underlying the 'high end' design, including rubber inserts around the volume and tone controls, a 'micro-tilt' adjustable neck, tuners with enclosed worms, a high-quality fully enclosed jack socket, a then new and contemporary Fender logo, sculpted pickups marked with an (original) Fender logo, felt washers to prevent the strap buttons marking the body. Individual intonation adjustment for each string was standard.

The Performer Bass was only ever available in one Standard version. The Standard retailed at $499, but still had a level of fittings comparable to high-level Precision and Jazz models. Unlike the Japanese-made Performer Standard, which featured a 3-ply white pickguard, dual single coils, 3-way toggle switch and a rosewood fretboard, a rumoured Performer Elite, having rear-routed controls and sporting three specially designed single coil pickups (with the first two placed side-by-side in the rear position and the third in the centre), 5-way switching and an ebony fretboard to be manufactured in the United States, retailing at $949, was never actually put into production.

A 5-string prototype of this bass was made in 1987.

== History ==
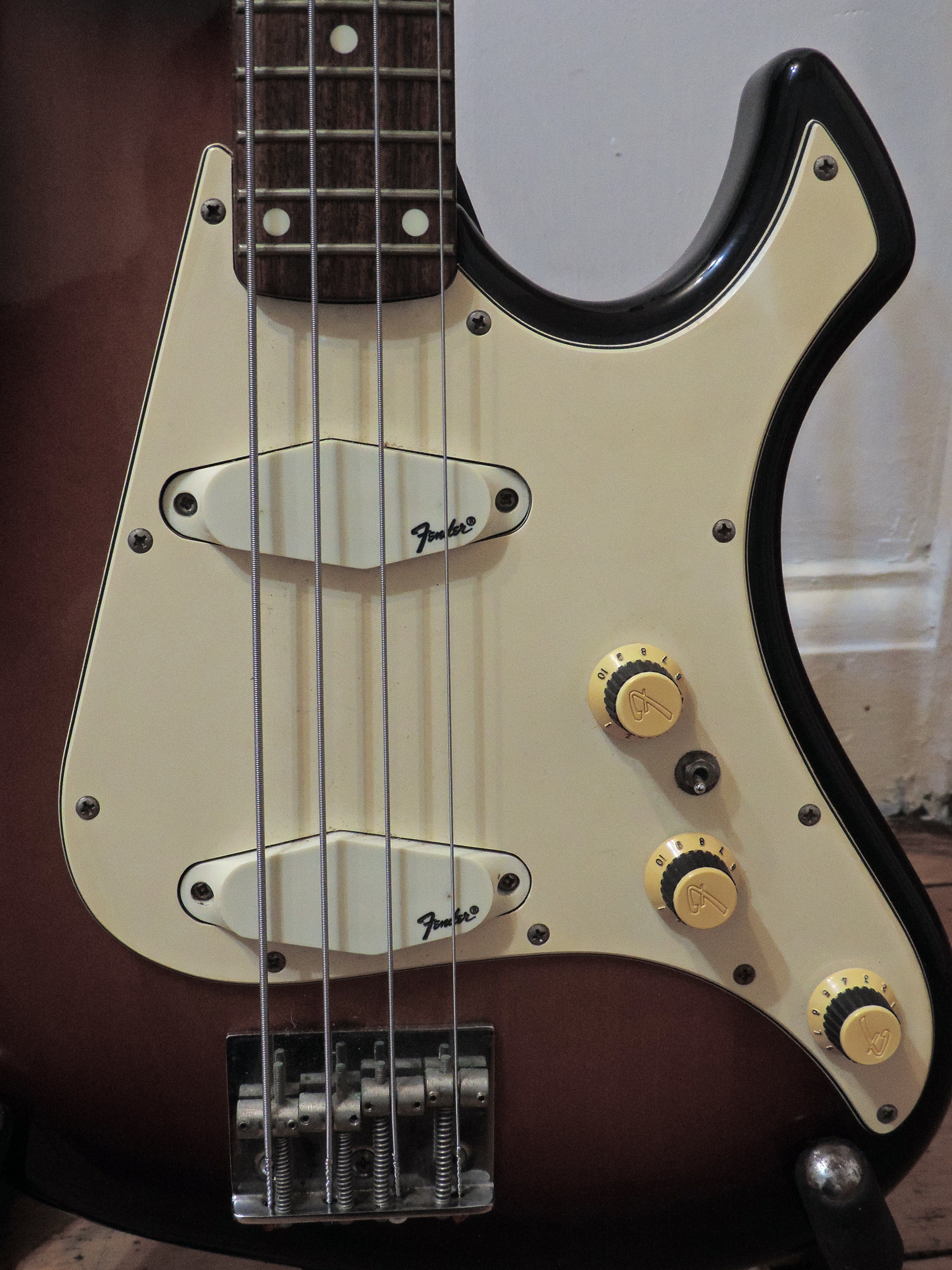
Body of a Fender Performer Bass Guitar showing pickups, bridge and controls

The Fender Performer Bass was designed by John Page to be an evolution version of the Fender Jazz Bass. The Performer Standard was manufactured by FujiGen in Japan in 1986, at a time when Fender was just completing moving United States production from Fullerton (which had been through terrible quality control issues) to Corona. Shortly after the launch of these instruments, CBS sold Fender to a group of employees led by Bill Schultz and production of the Performers ceased. It is rumored that only a few hundred were made and that some were ordered to be destroyed because of a copyright dispute concerning the neck; however, there is no credible evidence for this. Because no manufacturing assets were transferred in the sale – forcing the new owners to contract the manufacture of instruments – it is more likely that the new Fender Musical Instruments Corporation simply chose to focus on proven lines.

== Collectibility ==
Once largely ignored by Fender enthusiasts, the Performer has recently grown in popularity and second-hand values. As of 2021, these instruments have commanded prices as much as US$2,500 and higher.
