= Fender American Deluxe Series =

Line of Fender electric guitars and basses (1995–2016)

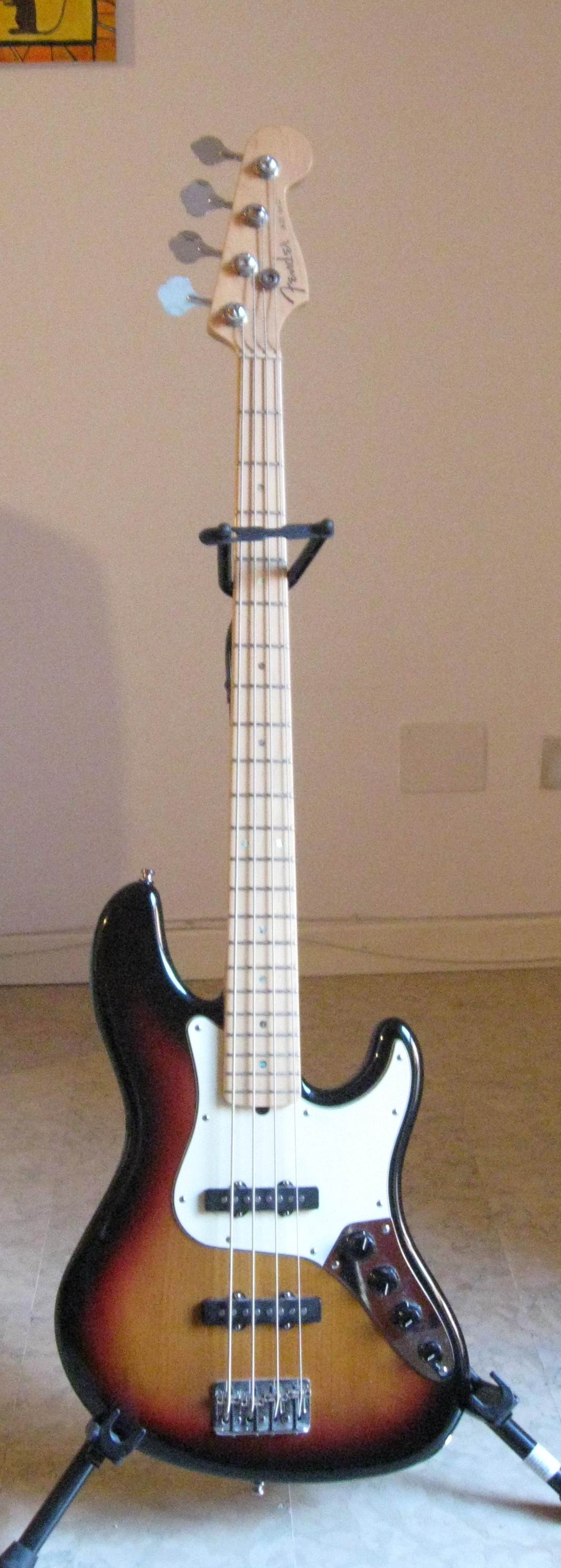
American Deluxe Jazz Bass

The Fender American Deluxe Series was a line of electric guitars and basses introduced by Fender in 1995 and discontinued in 2016. It was upgraded in 2004 and 2010 before being replaced by the American Elite series in 2016.

The American Deluxe line replaced the Plus Series models of 1987.

== Features ==
The entire range came with options such as solid tonewood bodies made from alder or ash, chrome or gold-plated hardware, aged plastic parts, Noiseless pickups, abalone shell dot position fingerboard inlays, a dark aluminum "spaghetti" decal, 22-fret maple necks featuring rosewood, maple or ebony fretboards, quilted or flamed maple tops, rolled fingerboard edges, Fender S-1 switching, highly detailed nut and fret work, a bound top with contoured back on Telecasters, a two-point synchronized tremolo with pop-in arm, LSR roller nut on the HSS model Stratocaster, and staggered locking tuning machines on certain models.

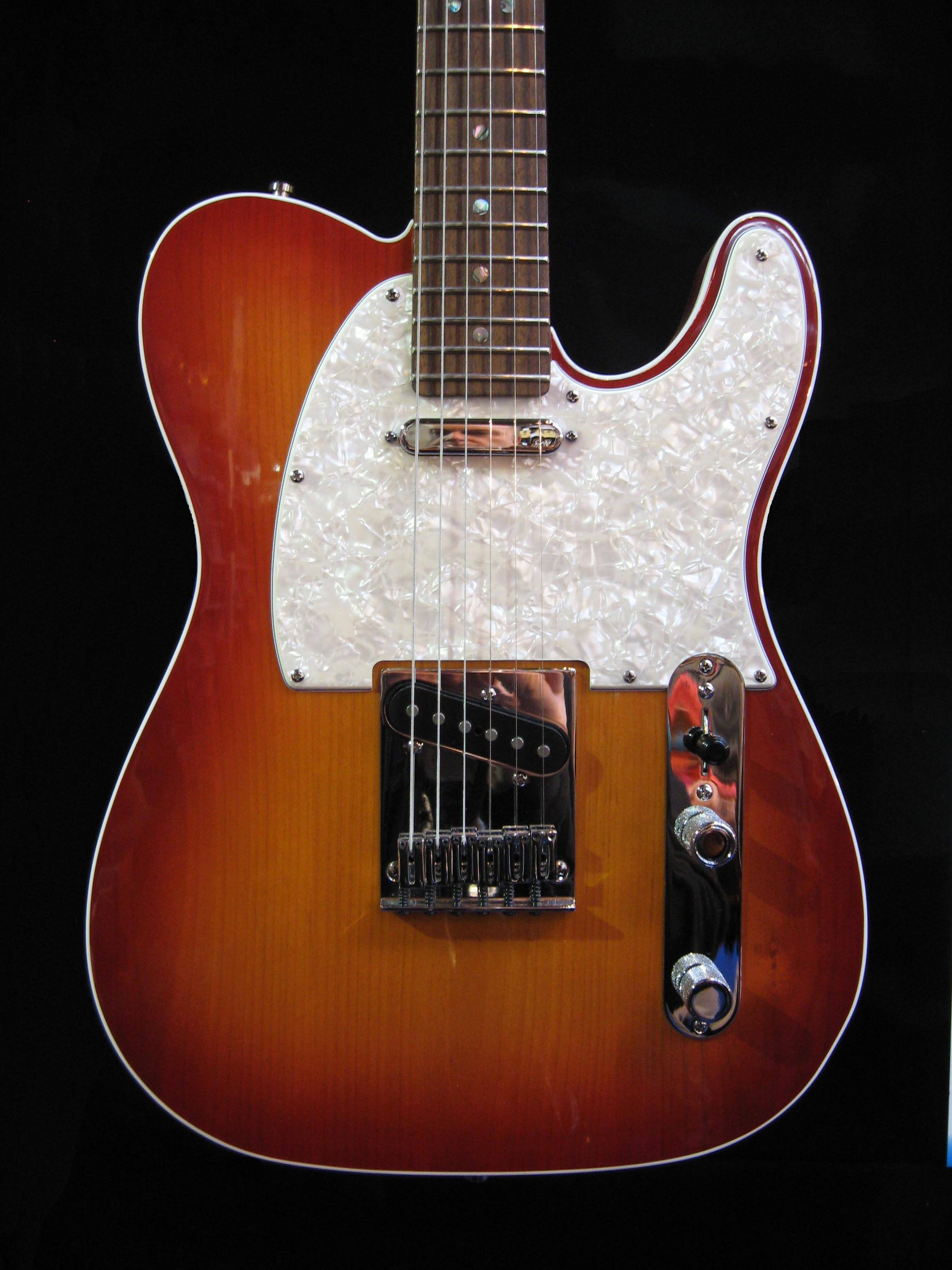
A cherry sunburst American Deluxe Telecaster with rosewood fingerboard, S-1 switch and SCN pickups

American Deluxe bass guitars (introduced in 1995) came in 4-string, fretless, 5-string and left-handed versions and feature 9V-powered 3-band active electronics (including a new design of humbucker on the Precision Bass models) as well as a strings-through/top-load bridge with stainless brass saddles, Hipshot UltraLite tuning machines, an asymmetrical 5-bolt neck plate with a contoured heel, designed for easier access to the higher registers and a Posiflex graphite-reinforced 22-fret maple neck with rosewood, maple or pao ferro fingerboard. Jazz Basses are made with chrome hardware, a traditional control plate with classic black bakelite knobs, a downsized body shape and a redesigned pickguard with nine holes.

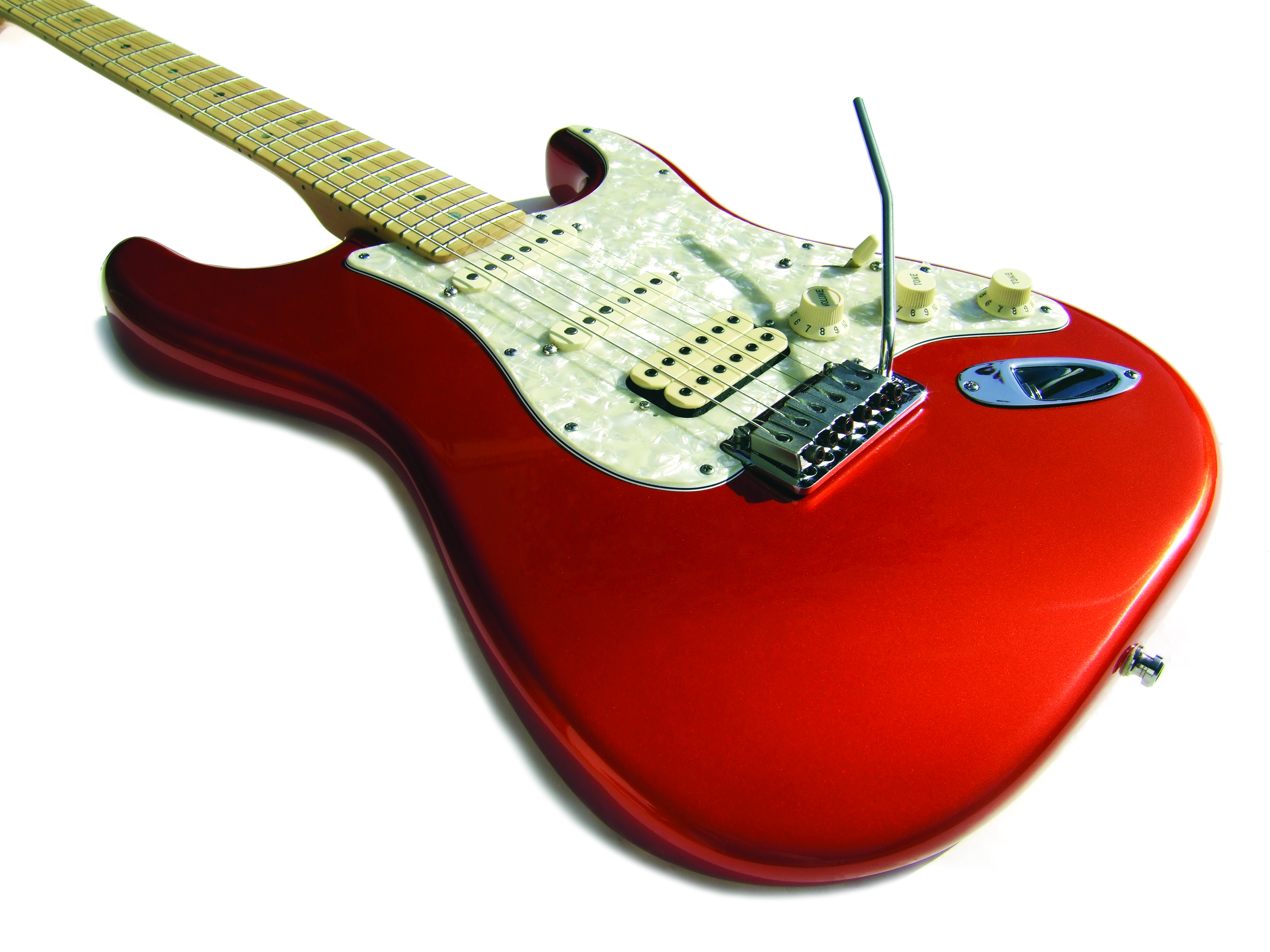
Angled view of a candy tangerine American Deluxe Stratocaster HSS with the optional deluxe locking tremolo system.

Fender also produced models with rear routed controls featuring flamed or quilted maple tops (FMT/QMT), gold hardware and bound necks with white pearloid rectangular block-shaped position markers from 2003 to 2007.

Models produced prior to 2002 used 4-bolt neck fixing, 5-in-line headstocks, black or white dot markers, Schaller die-cast tuners, 9V power supply and a new design of stacked "single-pole" Jazz Bass pickups (designed by John Suhr). Vintage Noiseless pickups, a dark aluminum Fender "spaghetti" logo and abalone inlaid fingerboards were added in 1998; 5-bolt neck fixing, 4+1 tuners, 18V power supply and Schaller Lite Bass tuning machines followed 4 years later (replaced by Hipshot UltraLite tuners as of 2006). As of March 23, 2010, all American Deluxe basses came with an active/passive switch, a Fender High-Mass Vintage (HMV) bridge, Hipshot lightweight vintage tuners, a recessed string retainer bar on the A string, tinted necks with 21-fret compound radiused fretboards and 1970s-era styling.

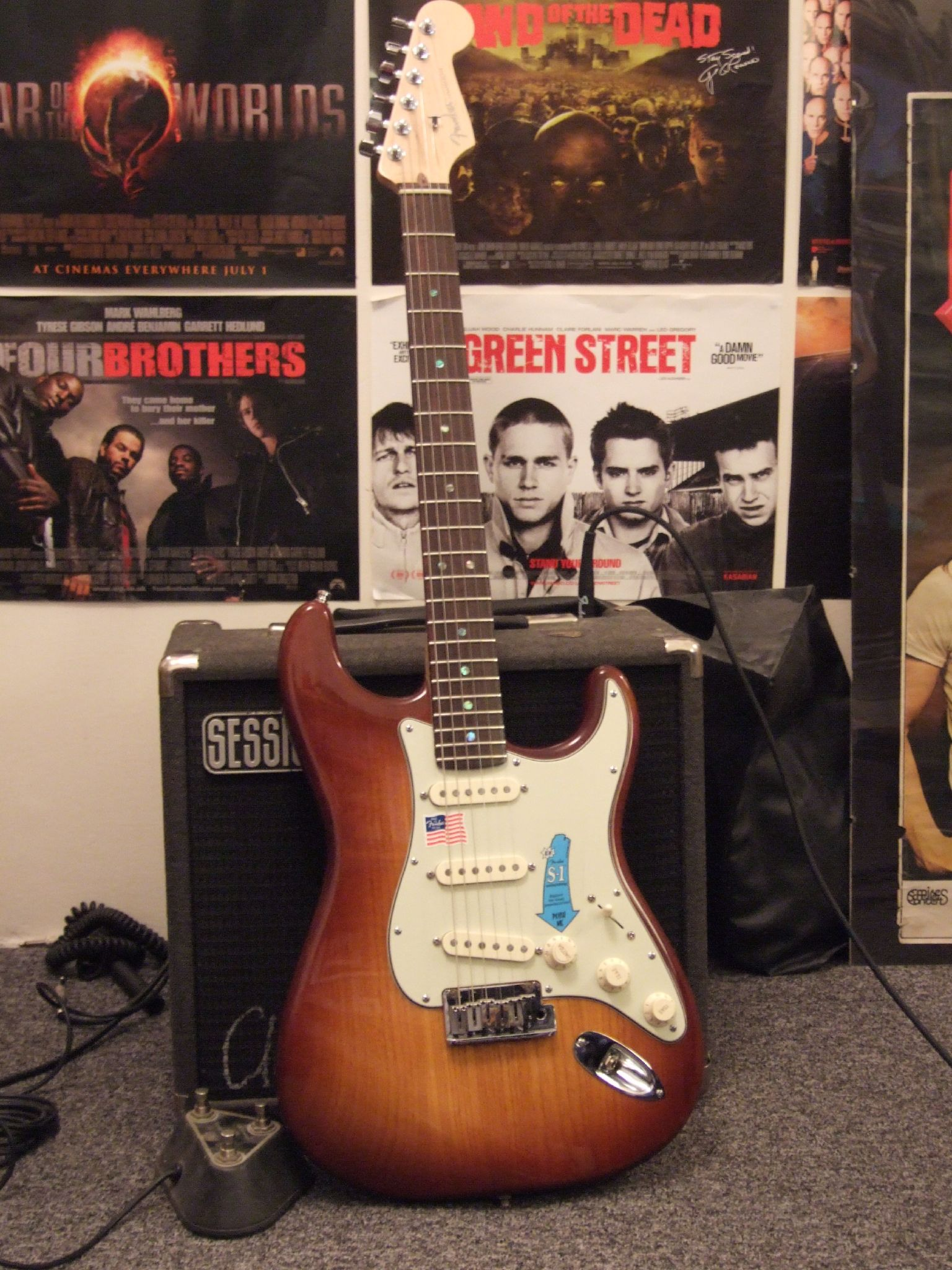
American Deluxe Stratocaster

Some of the design elements found on the American Deluxe instruments (such as the rolled fretboard edges, the HSH pickup routing and the nut and fret work) were adopted on the American Series models of 2001 (which replaced the first-generation American Standard line produced between 1986 and 2000) and the more recent American Standard Series instruments, introduced in 2008.

The American Deluxe was later updated with Samarium Cobalt Noiseless (SCN) pickups by Fender in 2004. As of March 23, 2010, all American Deluxe series guitars came with a tinted maple neck with compound/conical-radius fretboards, N3 noiseless pickups and the S-1 switching system has been reconfigured with a Passing Lane switch on the humbucker-equipped models.

As of January 2016, the American Deluxe series was discontinued and they were replaced with the American Elite series.
