= Fender Performer =

Electric guitar

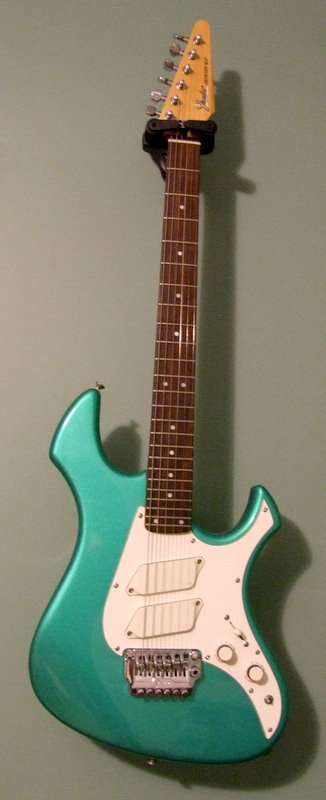
- Manufacturer: Fender
- Period: 1985–1986

Construction
- Body type: Solid
- Neck joint: Bolt-on
- Scale: 25.5 in (648 mm)

Woods
- Body: Alder, Basswood, Birch
- Neck: Maple
- Fretboard: Rosewood

Hardware
- Bridge: Fender System I tremolo
- Pickup(s): 2 humbuckers (H/H)

Colors available
- Various solid metallic and sunburst finishes

The Fender Performer or JP80 was an electric guitar designed by John Page for rock and metal guitarists in the mid-1980s. The Performer was also available as an electric bass.

== History ==
The Performer was first introduced in 1985, and was assembled by Fender Japan, Ltd. It was introduced in the transition from the CBS-owned Fender Electric Instrument Manufacturing Company to the new privately owned Fender Musical Instruments Corporation, and it was discontinued after only one year. The Performer was commissioned to combat lost sales to the "Superstrats" that were flooding the market in the mid-’80s.

In 2010, the instrument was featured in the video game Rock Band 3 under the name "Fender JP80".

== Features ==
The body is small with a deep double cutaway similar to the Fender Swinger. The tuning machines are found on the upper edge of the triangular headstock and a locking nut clamps the strings behind a plastic nut, as typically found on Fender guitars. The rosewood fretboard has 24 jumbo frets and features a locking nut. The bridge is a floating System I tremolo. The controls have inset rubber grips, the tuning heads have fully enclosed gears, and the jack socket is an enclosed, not 'skeleton', type, in contrast to many other Fender products with 'economy' hardware. The Fender Performer was available in the following poly finishes: Brown Sunburst (532), Frost White (555), Burgundy Mist (566), Emerald Mist (567) and Gun Metal Blue (568).

The two pickups are custom humbuckers which both sit at an angle opposite to that of a standard Stratocaster or Telecaster bridge pickup. It appears that the coils are offset to keep the magnets in line with the strings, although they are potted in epoxy so the magnets cannot be seen. The guitar featured controls for master volume and TBX, a 3-way pickup selector and a coil splitting switch. The TBX circuit used stacked 250k and 1M pots with a center detent.
