= Fender Elite Stratocaster =

Electric guitar model

The Fender Elite Stratocaster is an electric solid body guitar that was manufactured by Fender in 1983 and 1984. The name was revived from 2016 to 2019 with the Fender American Elite Stratocaster Series.

== History ==
The Elite Stratocaster was introduced in 1983. It started life as a USA-made model until 1985, when production was moved to Japan (Fujigen Gakki) before being finally discontinued in 1987. It served as a template for the Eric Clapton signature model of 1988. The Elite Strat featured Paul Gagon-designed active electronics, three alnico 2 single coil pickups with an internal dummy coil for noise reduction, Schaller cast-sealed locking tuners, "Free Flyte" floating tremolo, Ox bone nut and three push buttons allowing 7 pickup combinations.

Two of the few players of the Elite model are Ty Tabor of King's X, who used this guitar to record the first four albums of that band (his gear setup still retains the preamp from the guitar, now rackmounted) and blues/rock guitarist Jeff Fetterman of The Jeff Fetterman Band. Fetterman has used his Elites on stage and in studio for over 25 years now.

Some of the Elite features have been incorporated into USA-made Fender guitars and basses made after the purchase of the Fender guitar company from CBS by Bill Schultz in 1985. For example, the Eric Clapton, Richie Sambora (introduced in 1991) and Buddy Guy (introduced in 1995) signature guitars retain the TBX/MDX design from the Elite.

In late 1985, Fender Japan made the EST83-110 featuring a 22-fret fingerboard with a flat 12" radius and jumbo frets, offered in 3-Color Sunburst, Olympic White, Black and Candy Apple Red. The Japanese Elite series was discontinued in 1987.

== Features ==
This guitar model featured an alder body, a maple neck featuring a rosewood or maple fingerboard with 21 jumbo frets. There were also Gold and Walnut Elite variants with gold hardware, the latter sporting an American walnut body and an ebony fingerboard.

The Freeflyte tremolo system differed significantly from previous Stratocaster tremolo designs. All routing was done from the front of the guitar. A cavity was created where the spring system would reside, and this connected to the bottom of the tremolo unit. This reduced production costs since it required only a single, front-sided rout on the guitar to accommodate the pickups, the tremolo, the preamp and the controls.

Other features included three special-design alnico 2 single-coil pickups with solid covers and an internal dummy coil for hum cancellation, as well as three push-push buttons for pickup selection. Controls include a master volume, a TBX treble/bass expander and an active MDX midrange booster with 12dB of gain. The sound of the Elite Stratocaster can be described as more humbucker-like compared to a traditional single coil-equipped guitar, especially with the TBX and MDX circuits at their maximum.

A few Elite Stratocasters were manufactured with a standard 5-way switch and standard Strat knobs. Two such guitars which were custom built for Eric Clapton came with a traditional '50s era-style maple neck and a hardtail non-tremolo bridge.

The Elite series demonstrated changed production features for Fender, but it did not reach predicted sales or industry impact levels within the guitar market.

== 2016 American Elite Series ==
In January 2016, Fender introduced the American Elite Series Stratocaster. Features include:

- Gen 4 Noiseless™ pickups
- 5-Position blade switching with S-1™ switch
- Maple neck with Compound C-to-D shape
- Spoke wheel Bi-Flex™ truss rod system
- 9.5" to 14" fingerboard radius
- Maple, rosewood (discontinued in 2017) or ebony fingerboard
- 22 Medium jumbo frets
- Large pearloid fingerboard dots
- Locking tuners with shorter posts
- Bone nut
- Ash or alder body wood
- Soft-touch control knobs
- A new four-bolt heel design; the corner closest to the fingerboard is rounded off to give more comfortable access to the highest frets.
- ABS Elite Molded Case with TSA locks

Fender's Micro-Tilt neck adjustment is not available. The American Elite series were initially offered with a rosewood fingerboard until the switch to ebony in 2017 due to CITES regulations restricting the importing and exporting of rosewood in the United States. Fender discontinued the series in 2019.

== American Elite Stratocaster ==
The SSS version was available with either maple or ebony fingerboard and the body came in eight colors:

- 3-Color Sunburst
- Aged Cherry Burst
- Olympic Pearl
- Satin Ice Blue Metallic
- Sky Burst Metallic
- Satin Jade Pearl Metallic
- Tobacco Sunburst
- Ocean Turquoise

== American Elite Stratocaster HSS Shawbucker ==
The American Elite was also available in an HSS version with a Shawbucker humbucking pickup in the bridge position and a "Passing Lane" switch. This version was available with maple or ebony fingerboard and came in five colors:

- 3-Color Sunburst
- Olympic Pearl
- Satin Ice Blue Metallic
- Satin Jade Pearl Metallic
- Ocean Turquoise

== American Elite Stratocaster Left Handed ==
This model was essentially identical to the right handed version, available in 3-Color Sunburst with an ebony fingerboard. There was also a 3-Color Sunburst version with a maple fingerboard.

== Discontinued colors ==
- Autumn Blaze Metallic
- Mystic Black
- Ocean Turquoise
- Champagne Gold
- Surf Pearl W/Matching Headstock (Guitar Center Exclusive)
