= John Matos =

American graffiti artist (born 1961)

Crash
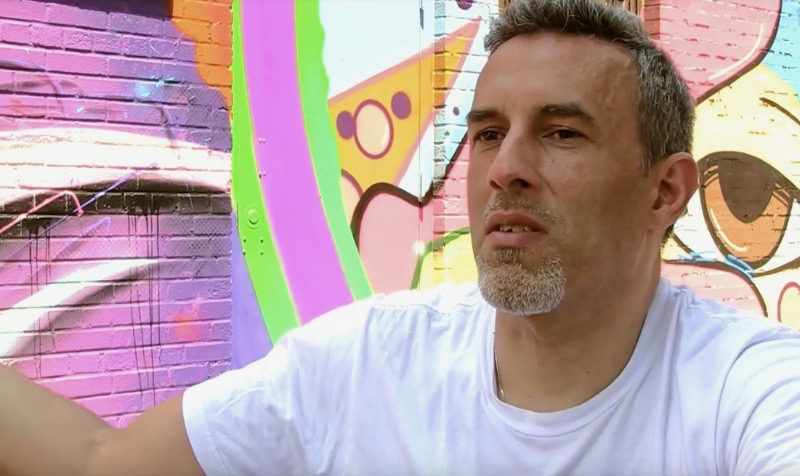
- Matos in 2018
- Born: John Matos; 1961 (age 64–65); New York City, US
- Movement: Graffiti
- Website: crashone.com

Crash (born John Matos; October 11, 1961, in Bronx, New York) is a graffiti artist.

== Early life ==
As early as 13, John Matos was spray painting New York City trains, the full image art as opposed to simpler tagging soon transferred to silk screened canvas.

== Recognition ==
Crash was first noticed through his murals on subway cars and dilapidated buildings and is now regarded as a pioneer of the Graffiti art movement.

His work is said to convey a "visual link between street life and established society". and in 1980, Crash curated the now iconic exhibition:"Graffiti Art Success for America" at Fashion Moda, launching the graffiti movement that has remained very active through today.

In 1983, Crash was given his first gallery showing by Sidney Janis at the Sidney Janis Gallery.

== Eric Clapton graffiti guitars ==
In 1996, Crash painted an Eric Clapton Signature Stratocaster and gave it to the artist as a gift. Clapton went on to use the specially designed guitar through his 2001 tour and later appeared with another. In total Crash has created 5 guitars for Clapton, though only three of them have made public appearances. One of Clapton's "Crashocasters" (nicknamed by Eric's former guitar tech, Lee Dickson) auctioned for $321,100 (USD) by the name of "Crash-3" and was used extensively during the first Crossroads Guitar Festival in 2004. Soon after Fender Musical Instruments commissioned the creation of 50 such graffiti designed guitars from Crash and named the line "Crashocasters." Crash went on to also design a line of custom painted Telecasters with matching Fender amps. Other artists such as John Mayer and Ed Sheeran have used the custom painted Crashocaster guitars. Crash painted another Crashocaster which Clapton played at the Crossroads Guitar Festival 2019 held at American Airlines Center of Dallas (Texas) on September 20 and 21, 2019.

== Crash x Teddy M Stratocaster for Ed Sheeran ==
In 2015, musician Ed Sheeran commissioned a collaboration between Crash and British artist Teddy M to create the 'Crash x Teddy M' Stratocaster. The guitar features Crash's famous eye design and the Teddy M Heart and was debuted by Sheeran during his sold out Wembley Stadium, London shows in July 2015.

== Notable exhibitions ==
In July 2006, the pieces titled "Aeroplane 1" (1983) and "A-U-T-O-matic",(1985), along with other paintings from their permanent collection were displayed in the Brooklyn Museum of Art in a featured exhibit titled "Graffiti."

In 2016, a new series of canvas spray paintings were displayed at JoAnne Artman Gallery in Chelsea for his solo exhibition entitled, "Breaking Ground: Redefining the Urban Experience." In 2018, Crash showed at JoAnne Artman Gallery again for another show, "Concrete Jungle."

== Notable projects ==
Also, in 2010, Crash was commissioned to create a special limited edition luggage for TUMI, Inc.

In 2019, Crash participated in the New York City's "Beyond the Streets," bringing a massive new showcase of the evolution of graffiti and street art to the city that helped it become a global phenomenon.
