= Roger Giffin =

English luthier

Roger Giffin is an English luthier, sometimes referred to as "guitarmaker to the stars". Notable guitarists who play his instruments include Eric Clapton, Pete Townshend, John Entwistle, Mark Knopfler, and David Gilmour. Giffin ran the Gibson Custom Shop for a while; one of the more notable guitars he built there was a copy of Jimmy Page's "No. 2", the basis for the Jimmy Page Signature model Les Pauls in the mid-1990s.
