= Postbauer-Heng =

- Municipality
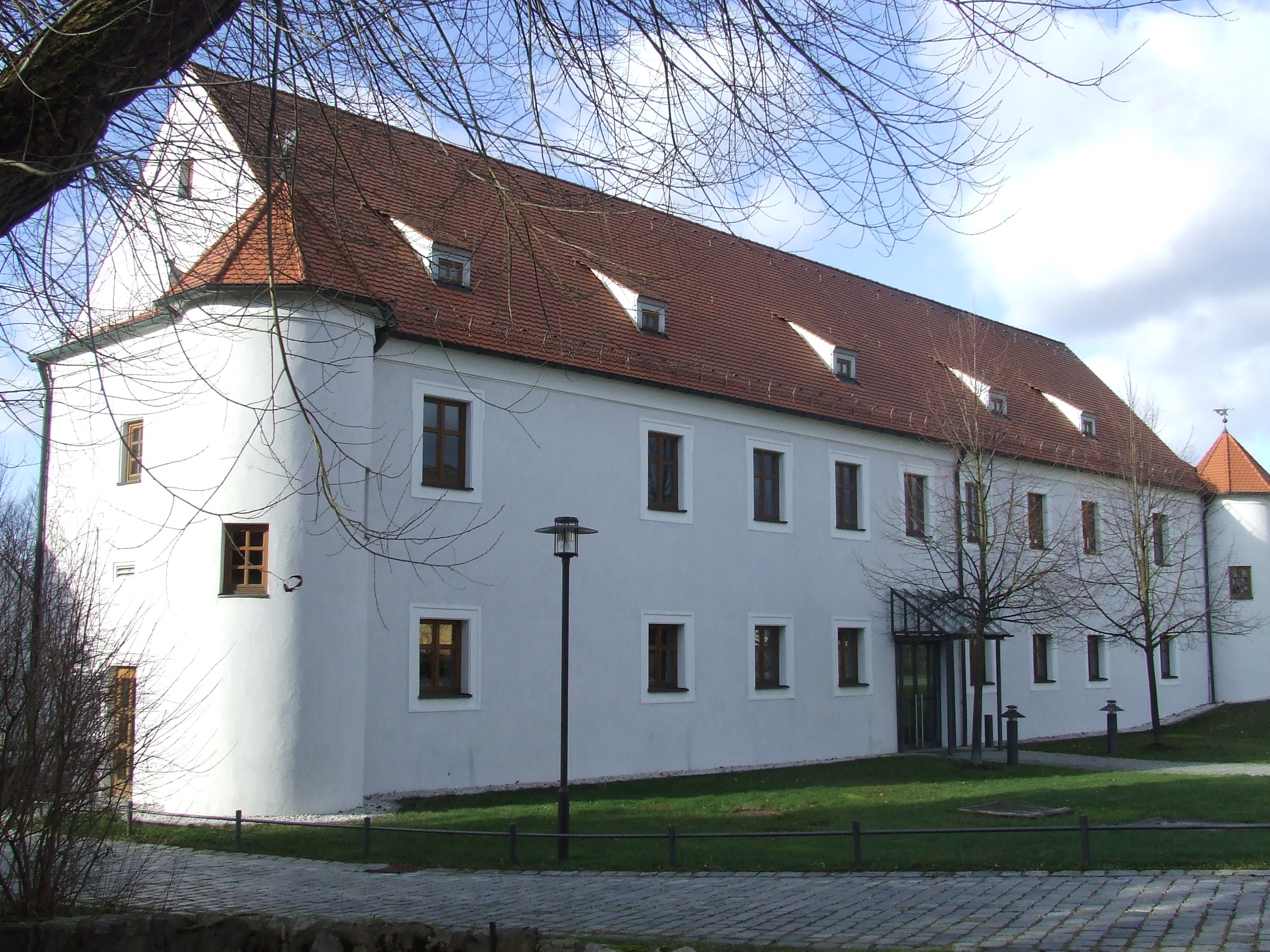
- Former castle of the Teutonic Order

- Coat of arms

- Location of Postbauer-Heng within Neumarkt in der Oberpfalz district
- Interactive map of Postbauer-Heng
- Location within Germany Location within Bavaria
- Coordinates: 49°18′N 11°21′E
- Country: Germany
- State: Bavaria
- Admin. region: Oberpfalz
- District: Neumarkt in der Oberpfalz
- Subdivisions: 9 Ortsteile

Government
  - Mayor (2020–26): Horst Kratzer (CSU)

Area
  - Total: 24.65 km^{2} (9.52 sq mi)
- Elevation: 450 m (1,480 ft)

Population (2025-12-31)
  - Total: 7,932
  - Density: 321.8/km^{2} (833.4/sq mi)
- Time zone: UTC+01:00 (CET)
  - Summer (DST): UTC+02:00 (CEST)
- Postal codes: 92353
- Dialling codes: 09188 (09180 Pavelsbach)
- Vehicle registration: NM
- Website: www.postbauer-heng.de

Postbauer-Heng is a municipality in the district of Neumarkt in Bavaria in Germany.
