= Fender Custom Shop =

Division of Fender Musical Instruments Corporation

- Company type: Subsidiary
- Industry: Musical instruments
- Founded: 1987; 39 years ago
- Headquarters: Corona, California, United States
- Area served: Worldwide
- Key people: John Page and Michael Stevens
- Products: Electric guitars Bass guitars
- Parent: Fender
- Website: www.fendercustomshop.com

The Fender Custom Shop is a division of Fender Musical Instruments Corporation, housed within its headquarters complex in Corona, Riverside County, California. The Fender Custom Shop produces special-order guitars for customers through a Custom Shop dealer network, creates limited edition high end quality guitars, builds limited edition amplifiers, and does some research & design for the parent company.

== History ==
For nearly 20 years (since 1965), Fender was owned and operated by CBS. Many guitar players felt that the interests of CBS were at odds with the marketplace and profits declined. In 1984, CBS sold the rights to the Fender name and designs to an investor group of employees led by Bill Schultz who launched Fender Musical Instruments Corporation (FMIC).

The Fender Custom Shop began in 1987, under the supervision of then-CEO Schultz. The initial staff comprised only two Master Builders (John Page, Michael Stevens) and a Haas VF4 CNC machine (modified for woodwork) that cuts three bodies or four necks at once. The primary intent of the Fender Custom Shop was to create instruments in the tradition of Leo Fender and his staff at the original Fender facilities in Fullerton, California, accommodating famous endorsers and other discerning players who wanted the accuracy, detail, and quality—as well as customization and personal touches—that were widely perceived as omitted under the tutelage of CBS, and considered lacking on the revamped Fender's mass-produced instruments. In 1991, the Fender Custom Amp Shop was created and housed in Scottsdale, Arizona. Seven years later, Fender USA manufacturing, R&D and Custom Shop divisions, were moved to its present location in Corona, California.

The Fender Custom Shop employs over fifty craftsmen and produces both custom one-off projects and limited CNC-tooled production runs. The 2023 roster of master builders are: Dale Wilson, Paul Waller, Jason Smith, Yuriy Shishkov, Todd Krause, Dennis Galuszka, Greg Fessler, Kyle McMillin, Vincent van Trigt, Austin MacNutt, Andy Hicks, David Brown, Ron Thorn, and Levi Perry.

== Notable products ==
The Fender Custom Shop has produced a huge range of instruments, often limited in number, which reflect its original mission as a link between the needs of specific players and the Fender corporation and their established designs and innovations as a whole.

First and foremost, the Custom Shop creates one-off products, not explicitly intended for the public, designed to meet the needs of specific artists. Examples include the tweed Twin remakes crafted by hand by John Suhr for Eric Clapton, and later delivered to Mark Knopfler and B.B. King, the Jag-Stang model designed with help from Kurt Cobain and later manufactured by Fender Japan, and the Danny Gatton Telecaster, a very early Custom Shop effort that eventually mutated into a limited production item.

Closely related, and in some cases a direct result of collaborations with and for specific players, are the artist models that are specifically available to the public. Some of these models are designed to be near-exact replicas of a noted player's trademark instrument—including the "relic" treatment and the various degrees of ageing (patterns of wear, modifications, stickers and abuse)—such as in the case of the Jeff Beck Tribute Esquire, the Jaco Pastorius ersatz fretless Jazz Bass, and a replica model of Stevie Ray Vaughan's heavily weathered trademark Stratocaster. These models are meticulously crafted by hand, under the supervision of one luthier as opposed to part of an assembly line. Fender makes this distinction by tagging these models as 'Master Built' and 'Team Built'. These instruments are designed to closely replicate the original examples and are very limited in number and often extremely expensive. Far more common under the Custom Shop banner are production models commissioned by players and made available to the general public, albeit in more limited quantity than Fender's standard lines. This line includes high-end models in series such as Custom Classics, Showmasters and Time Machines. Examples of guitars designed by specific players and manufactured by the Custom Shop include signature guitars for David Gilmour, Eric Clapton, Jeff Beck, Albert Collins, Merle Haggard, and John5.

Some models, such as the aforementioned Jag-Stang and the Venus model, designed with Courtney Love, are designed by the Custom Shop but manufactured by Fender's Far-Eastern import facilities, and in the case of the Venus model, Fender's low budget offshoot Squier. For further confusion, several models are available from both the Custom Shop, and made in the US, and from Fender Musical Instruments' overseas facilities, often in much less limited quantity, and for much less cost.

An offshoot of Fender's forays into replicating the look of heavily worn instruments was the introduction of the Fender Relic series in the late 1990s. Urban legend states that idea came as guitarist Keith Richards of the British rock group The Rolling Stones told the Custom Shop that some replicas he commissioned for a Stones tour 'looked too new', stating: "Bash 'em up a bit and I'll play 'em," but this has been denied by multiple Fender employees and Richards himself. The true story stemmed from Stones' producer Don Was. In 1994 Jay W. Black, one of the Senior Master Builders at the time, attended a Stones recording session in Los Angeles. Was wanted Black to beat up his new Sadowsky bass that he was due to play with Bonnie Raitt at a Grammy Awards ceremony because he felt "it looked too squeaky clean".

The Relic models are finished in a shabby chic style and aspire to perfectly replicate vintage instruments, both in terms of the parts, design and finishes used, as well in the varying degrees of wear typically found on a 40- to 50-year-old instrument. Fender tarnishes metal parts, purposely marks and scratches paintjobs, yellows and cracks plastic parts, and cigarette burns marks in the headstock (some players allegedly timed jam sessions by cigarette burn time). "Relic-ing" is controversial among players who question the logic of paying a premium for a deliberately damaged instrument. Fender offers grades of wear in the relic series, from light to very heavy 'wear', and has since introduced a line of 'NOS' (new old stock) and 'Closet Classic' instruments that employ period-correct parts, designs and finishes but do not feature faux abuse, weathering, or aging.

Recently, the Fender Custom Shop has devoted much time and resources to creating limited 'Art' guitars and basses. Generally shown off at the annual NAMM Show, these instruments are generally geared more towards guitar collectors than players and are often created to tie in with other industries as collector items, such as guitars created as a tribute to, and under the design influence of Ford's Mustang automobile. Many of the Art guitars created by the Custom Shop vastly expand upon Leo Fender's historical decorative innovations, who originally pioneered the use of custom colors on their instruments, which are essentially based on traditional designs but do not strive for accuracy to specific models.

The Fender Custom Amp Shop, a subset of the Custom Shop, has produced several limited-run amplifiers during its existence. Examples include the Tone-Master, Prosonic, Tweed Reissue Twin Reverb, and Two-Tone models.

Fender also produces Fender Custom Shop calendars, which feature its many different guitars and basses.
