= Lace Sensor =

Guitar pickup

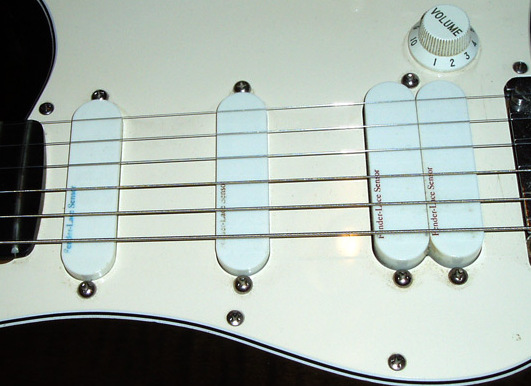
Fender-Lace Sensors installed as stock on a Fender Strat Ultra.

The Lace Sensor is a guitar pickup designed by Don Lace and manufactured by AGI (Actodyne General International) since 1985. Lace Sensors are true single coil pickups; however, internally they are different from classic single coils. The chief difference is that, like the pickups used on the Fender Jaguar, the coil is surrounded by metal barriers which are designed to reduce electromagnetic interference such as power line hum. According to the manufacturer, these barriers also help concentrate the magnetic field, allowing weaker magnets to be used, which results in less string pull. This line of electric guitar pickups was used exclusively by Fender from 1985 to 1996.

== Ratings ==
Four types of Lace Sensor pickups for Stratocaster were originally manufactured, followed by five newer models, each with a different output rating and tone. They are differentiated by color names. Lace Sensors are also available in a variety of other sizes and configurations.

== Dually ==
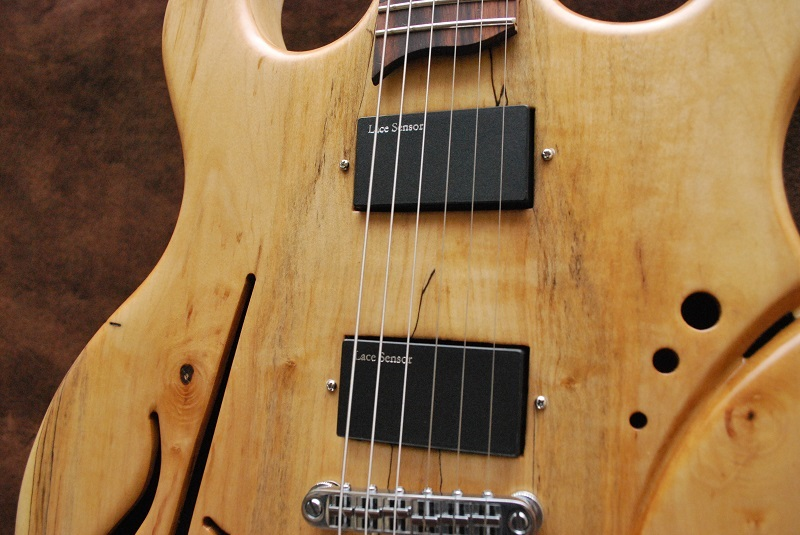
A Nitro-Hemi Lace Sensor on a hand-made Girouard Guitar.

A Lace Sensor "Dually" is effectively a double coil unit combining two Lace Sensor single coil pickups in a humbucker configuration. The terminal leads of both pickup coils are accessible individually, so that they can be wired for a coil-splitting option or any other configuration.

These double coil Lace Sensors were used as a standard equipment material on the original Jeff Beck Stratocaster, the Telecaster Plus/Deluxe Plus and the Stratocaster Ultra, manufactured by Fender in the early 1990s, as well on some Custom Shop models such as the Set Neck and Contemporary Stratocaster guitars.

Usually a humbucker needs to comprise at least two coils with equal output, in order to produce the noise-cancelling effect. Lace Sensors are able to use mismatched coils because both coils are already low in noise even if used as single coils.

== Lace Alumitone ==
Invented by Jeff Lace and introduced in 2007, Lace Alumitone pickups feature a new design which is aluminium based, rather than copper. The result is less resistance, higher output coupled to a "current driven design" as opposed to conventional voltage based pickups.

The water-jet-cut aluminium exoskeleton is then mated to a micro winding using 90% less fine copper wire. A low-impedance/high-performance pickup is then created. Due to this design, Alumitones can be produced into a variety of shapes and sizes. This makes it possible to fit Alumitones into almost any standard pickup or humbucker routing. Lace produces Alumitones for guitar, bass, pedal steel, extended range guitars and basses, cigar box guitars, and more.

Sonically, the pickups produce more bass than traditional single coils, more volume, mids are slightly more than conventional pickups. Highs are balanced and articulate. Early Alumitone pickups were only available with single conductor wiring, all contemporary models offer twin conductor wiring options.
