= Bill Schultz (Fender) =

American engineer and business executive

- Born: William Charles Schultz; July 30, 1926; McKeesport, Pennsylvania, US
- Died: September 21, 2006 (aged 80)
- Occupations: Engineer; business executive; musical instrument repair technician

William Charles Schultz (July 30, 1926 – September 21, 2006) was an American engineer and business executive who was CEO of Fender Musical Instruments Corporation from 1981 to 2005. Schultz is credited as the "man who saved Fender" for overseeing the company's return to profitability and expansion after its sale by CBS in 1985.

== Biography ==
Schultz was born on July 30, 1926 in McKeesport, Pennsylvania. Before his engineering and corporate career, he played saxophone and clarinet professionally and worked in musical instrument repair. After serving in the United States Air Force during World War II, Schultz helped open the Dorn and Kirchner School of Band Instrument Repair and later owned and managed Progressive Music, a musical repair and service business in McKeesport. The NAMM Oral History Program also described Schultz as having opened his own musical instrument repair business within the Progressive Music store.

Schultz graduated as an engineer from the New Jersey Institute of Technology in 1965 and went to work for Bethlehem Steel in Baltimore. Schultz received his master's degree in aerospace engineering while working at Bendix Aerospace on radar tracking devices for the Apollo program. In 1971, he received an MBA from Rutgers University and began working at the CBS Corporation.

Schultz also worked in the musical-instrument business before joining Fender. In 1962, he became service manager and education-market salesman for Lyon & Healy in Chicago. In 1967, he joined the Fred Gretsch Co. as educational director and sales coordinator, with responsibilities that included marketing programs, sales training programs, and trade-show activities. He was hired by Yamaha Musical Instruments Company in 1969 and became the company's president in 1978. The NAMM Oral History Program similarly describes Schultz as having joined Yamaha Musical Products Co. and risen to president before being recruited by CBS Musical Instruments.

In 1981, Schultz was working at Yamaha when he was asked by John C. McLaren, then-president of CBS Musical Instruments, to become the president of Fender. When CBS decided to sell the struggling company in 1985, Schultz and several other employees purchased it. Schultz was among the management team who recommended that CBS begin alternate production of Japanese Fenders in 1982, as the company's sales suffered from competition with copies produced by Japanese manufacturers such as Tokai and Fernandes. Schultz established Fender's manufacturing facility in Corona, California, and moved the company's headquarters to Scottsdale, Arizona, in 1991.

Schultz, and through him Fender, became a major donor to Duquesne University, which honored him in 2001 with a Lifetime Achievement Award and a week of concerts. He retired in 2005 and was replaced by William Mendello, though he remained on the board of directors. Schultz died in 2006 of cancer.
