= Schaller GmbH =

German manufacturer of musical hardware

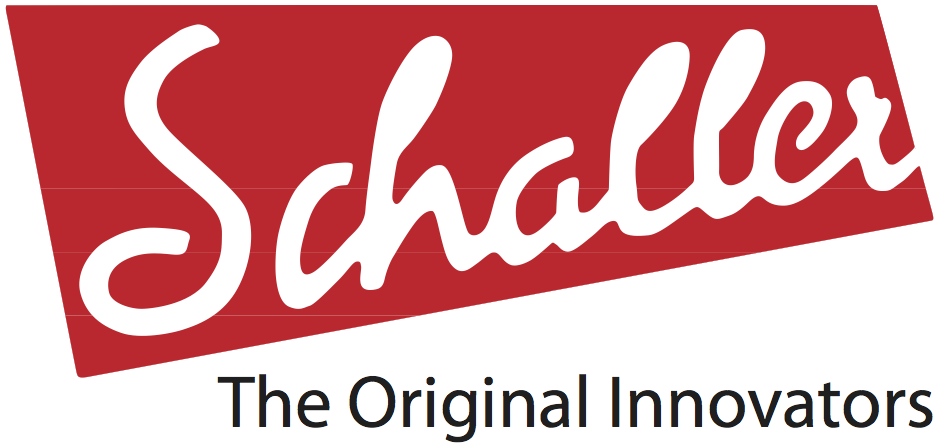
- Type: GmbH (private limited company)
- Industry: musical instrument hardware
- Founded: 1945; 81 years ago
- Headquarters: Postbauer-Heng, Germany
- Owner: Dr. Lars Bünning (owner and CEO)
- Number of employees: about 100
- Website: schaller.info

Schaller GmbH is a German manufacturer of musical instrument hardware, based in Postbauer-Heng near Nuremberg, Bavaria, which designs and produces guitar tuners, bridges, tremolos, strap locks and other guitar accessories. The company has been owned by Dr Lars Bünning since 2009.

== History ==
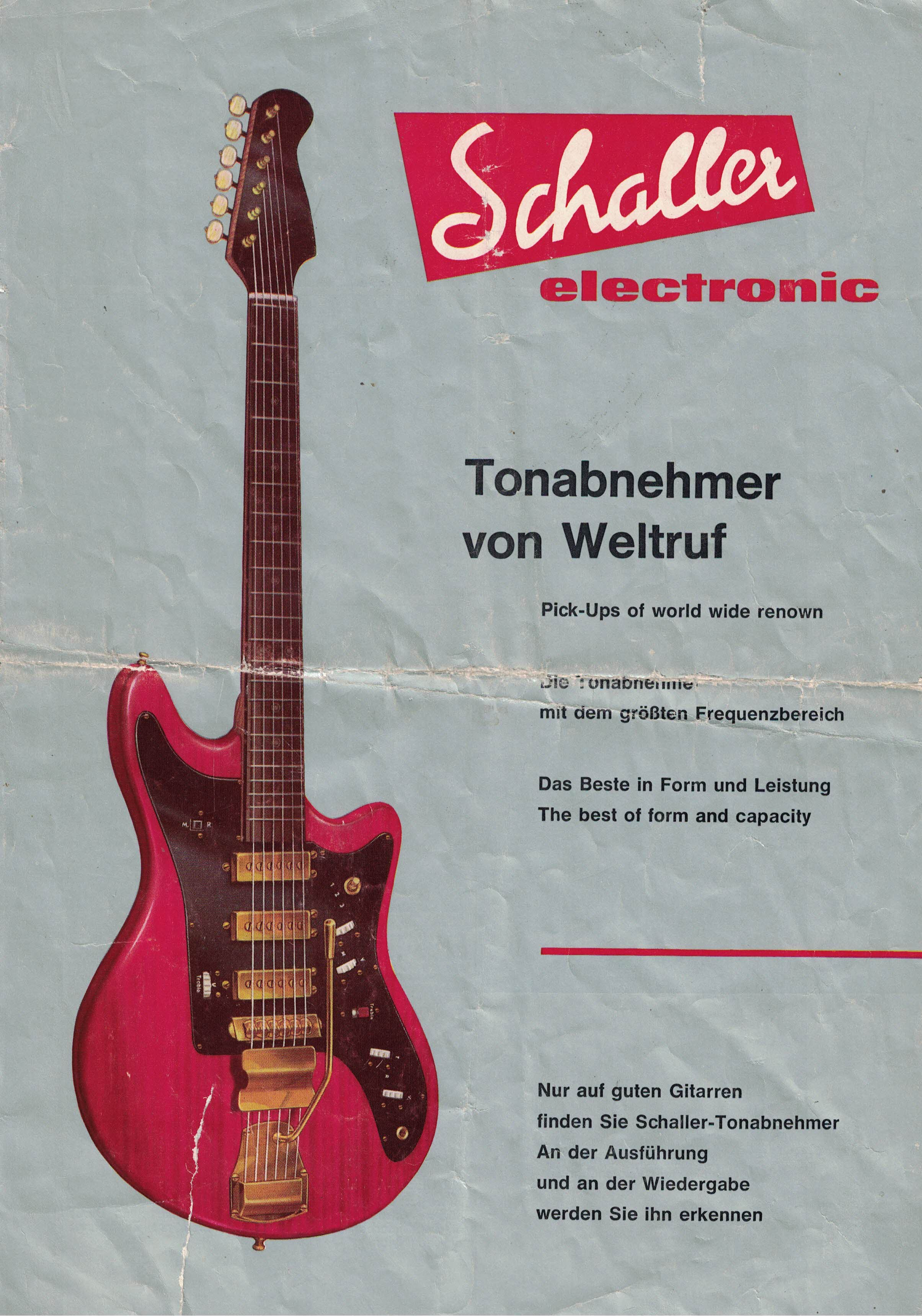
First Advertisement of Schaller for Pickups

The company was founded in 1945 by Helmut Schaller (1923–1999), a toolmaker and radio master mechanic. His radio repair shop prospered in the 1950s, and a department was formed dedicated to the development of amplifiers and loudspeakers. This was so successful that the company was restructured and renamed "Schaller Electronic".

By 1953, Schaller had begun manufacturing at Feucht guitar components such as pickups and switches for Fred Wilfer's guitar company, Framus, in Bubenreuth, Bavaria. Other German guitar manufacturers such as Höfner, Hopf and Hoyer became customers, and by the 1960s, American guitar makers, including Fender, Gibson, C. F. Martin and Ovation were using Schaller products on their guitars and basses.

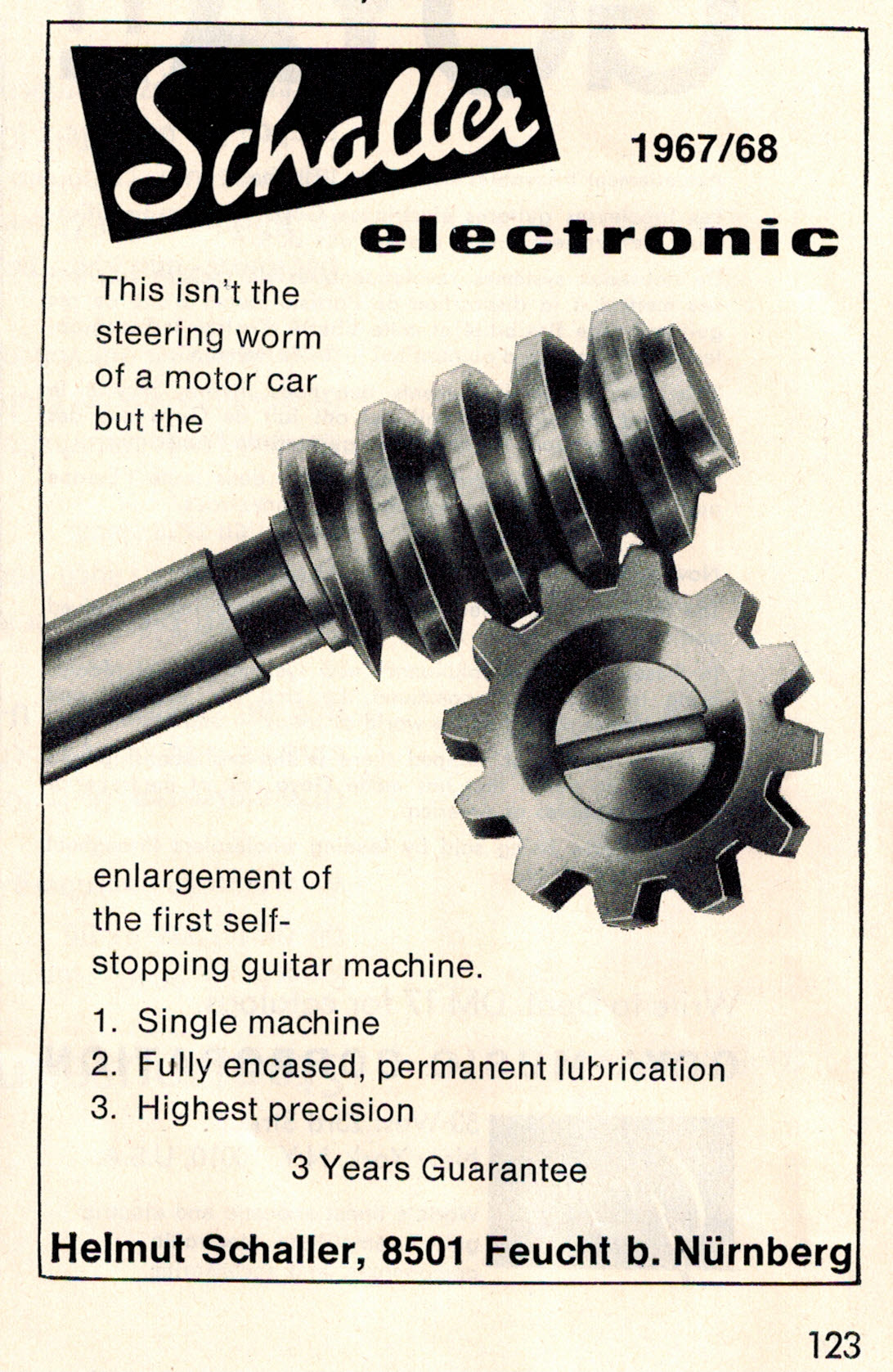
Schaller M6 Machine Head

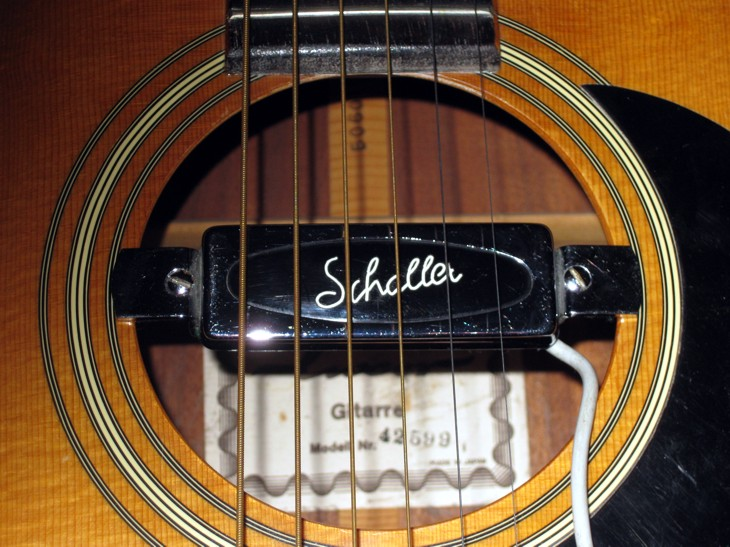
Schaller Pickup from around 1970

Schaller extended its product range to tremolos (1961), bridges (1962) and machine heads (1966). The company's M6 tuning machine was the world's first fully enclosed, self-locking precision tuner.

In 1968, Schaller moved to a site at Postbauer-Heng and set up a new production facility. The product range was expanded in the 1970s to include M4 bass tuners, various bridges, including TOM bridges for Gibson guitars, and numerous other variants of pickups.

The company ceased production of loudspeakers, amplifiers and reverb units at the beginning of the 1980s and focused on producing metal components for guitars. In 1981, Schaller designed and patented a locking device which provided secure connection of strap to guitar. This became the company's most successful product.

From 1983, Schaller became the official manufacturer of genuine Floyd Rose tremolo systems, after Floyd Rose and executives of Kramer Guitars decided not to continue with Fernandes Guitars of Japan who previously held the contract since Rose first started mass-manufacturing at the end of 1981.

The product portfolio expanded steadily during the 1980s and 1990s. Violin accessories and spinning machines for strings and ball ends were added, but the newly introduced products did not achieve the same success as the guitar components. This expansion ended after the deaths of Helmut Schaller in 1999 and his son René Schaller in 1998.

From 1999 to 2006, the company was run by a community of heirs. Grete Schaller (1926–2007), Helmut Schaller's widow, led the company.

In 2006, the Schaller company was restructured. It was renamed as a limited liability company (GmbH) by a partnership. Lars Bünning became managing director of the company and took over the Schaller family's shares of the GmbH in December 2006.

== Current Schaller products ==
=== Machine heads ===
- GrandTune Series
- M4 Series
- M6 Series
- F-Series
- Da Vinci
- BM Series
- Lyra
- Hauser

=== Bridges and tailpieces ===
- Signum
- Hannes
- TOM- and 3D-bridges
- STM and GTM Gibson Les Paul replacement bridges, and accompanying tailpiece

=== Tremolos ===
- LockMeister
- Schaller
- Vintage series
- SureClaw spring tensioner

=== Accessories ===
- S-Locks
- "Flagship" preamp
- "Oyster" piezo pickup
- Megaswitches
- Covers and frames for pickups

The production of pickups by Schaller was discontinued in 2017.

The shift towards machine heads and metal hardware resulted in the company being renamed from "Schaller Electronic" to "Schaller GmbH". All Schaller products are manufactured in the Schaller factory in Postbauer-Heng. Schaller customers are both guitar manufacturers and musicians.
