= Sloan Research Fellowship =

Sloan Research Fellowships
- Awarded for: recognition of distinguished performance by early career researchers and their unique potential to make substantial contributions
- Country: Worldwide
- Presented by: Alfred P. Sloan Foundation
- First award: 1955
- Website: sloan.org/fellowships

The Sloan Research Fellowships are awarded annually by the Alfred P. Sloan Foundation since 1955 to "provide support and recognition to early-career scientists and scholars". This program is one of the oldest of its kind in the United States.

Fellowships were initially awarded in physics, chemistry, and mathematics. Awards were later added in neuroscience (1972), economics (1980), computer science (1993), computational and evolutionary molecular biology (2002), and ocean sciences or earth systems sciences (2012). Winners of these two-year fellowships are awarded $75,000, which may be spent on any expense supporting their research. From 2012 through 2020, the foundation awarded 126 research fellowships each year; in 2021, 128 were awarded, and 118 were awarded in 2022.

== Eligibility and selection ==
To be eligible, a candidate must hold a Ph.D. or equivalent degree and must be a member of the faculty of a college, university, or other degree-granting institution in the United States or Canada. The candidate must have teaching responsibilities and must be tenure-track but untenured as of September 15 of the nomination year. Only candidates with letters of nomination from department heads or other senior researchers are considered.

The foundation has been supportive of scientists who are parents by allowing them extra time after their doctorate during which they remain eligible for the award.

An independent committee of distinguished scientists in each field selects the fellows based upon their research accomplishments, creativity, and potential to become leaders in their chosen field.

Since the inaugural class of 1955, 6,144 fellowships have been awarded, with faculty from the top ten universities representing over 35% of all fellows. MIT counts the most fellows at 309, followed by Berkeley at 291, Harvard at 242, Stanford at 237, and Princeton at 236.

| Institution | Fellows (1955–2022) |
|---|---|
| Massachusetts Institute of Technology | 309 |
| University of California, Berkeley | 291 |
| Harvard University | 242 |
| Stanford University | 237 |
| Princeton University | 236 |
| The University of Chicago | 204 |
| University of California, Los Angeles | 176 |
| Columbia University | 172 |
| Cornell University | 159 |
| California Institute of Technology | 154 |

== Notable award recipients ==
Since the beginning of the program in 1955, 53 fellows have won a Nobel Prize, and 17 have won the Fields Medal in mathematics.

=== Sloan Fellowship recipients who became Nobel or Fields Medal laureates ===
| Name | Field (Note: Field of the Sloan fellowship) | Sloan year | Prize year (Note: Unless stated, the prize was awarded in the same field as that of the Sloan fellowship) |
|---|---|---|---|
| Richard Feynman | Physics | 1955 | 1965 |
| Murray Gell-Mann | Physics | 1957 | 1969 |
| Leon N. Cooper | Physics | 1959 | 1972 |
| Sheldon Glashow | Physics | 1962 | 1979 |
| Steven Weinberg | Physics | 1961 | 1979 |
| Val L. Fitch | Physics | 1960 | 1980 |
| James W. Cronin | Physics | 1962 | 1980 |
| Kenneth G. Wilson | Physics | 1963 | 1982 |
| Jack Steinberger | Physics | 1958 | 1988 |
| Melvin Schwartz | Physics | 1959 | 1988 |
| Frederick Reines | Physics | 1959 | 1995 |
| Alan J. Heeger | Chemistry | 1963 | 2000 (Physics) |
| Carl E. Wieman | Physics | 1984 | 2001 |
| David J. Gross | Physics | 1970 | 2004 |
| H. David Politzer | Physics | 1977 | 2004 |
| Frank Wilczek | Physics | 1976 | 2004 |
| Theodor W. Hänsch | Physics | 1973 | 2005 |
| Donna Strickland | Physics | 1998 | 2018 |
| Roald Hoffmann | Chemistry | 1966 | 1981 |
| Dudley R. Herschbach | Chemistry | 1959 | 1986 |
| Yuan T. Lee | Chemistry | 1969 | 1986 |
| John C. Polanyi | Chemistry | 1959 | 1986 |
| Elias J. Corey | Chemistry | 1955 | 1990 |
| Rudolph A. Marcus | Chemistry | 1960 | 1992 |
| Mario J. Molina | Chemistry | 1976 | 1995 |
| Robert F. Curl, Jr. | Chemistry | 1961 | 1996 |
| Richard E. Smalley | Chemistry | 1978 | 1996 |
| Ahmed H. Zewail | Chemistry | 1978 | 1999 |
| Alan G. MacDiarmid | Chemistry | 1959 | 2000 |
| K. Barry Sharpless | Chemistry | 1973 | 2001 |
| Robert H. Grubbs | Chemistry | 1974 | 2005 |
| Richard R. Schrock | Chemistry | 1976 | 2005 |
| Martin Karplus | Chemistry | 1959 | 2013 |
| Arieh Warshel | Chemistry | 1978 | 2013 |
| John Forbes Nash | Mathematics | 1956 | 1994 (Economics) |
| Eric Maskin | Economics | 1983 | 2007 |
| Roger Myerson | Economics | 1984 | 2007 |
| Alvin E. Roth | Economics | 1984 | 2012 |
| Lars Peter Hansen | Economics | 1982 | 2013 |
| Jean Tirole | Economics | 1985 | 2014 |
| Stanley Prusiner | Neuroscience | 1976 | 1997 (Medicine) |
| Paul Lauterbur | Chemistry | 1965 | 2003 (Medicine) |
| Linda B. Buck | Neuroscience | 1992 | 2004 (Medicine) |
| John Milnor | Mathematics | 1955 | 1962 |
| Paul Cohen | Mathematics | 1962 | 1966 |
| Stephen Smale | Mathematics | 1960 | 1966 |
| Heisuke Hironaka | Mathematics | 1962 | 1970 |
| John G. Thompson | Mathematics | 1961 | 1970 |
| David Mumford | Mathematics | 1962 | 1974 |
| Charles Fefferman | Mathematics | 1970 | 1978 |
| Daniel G. Quillen | Mathematics | 1967 | 1978 |
| William Thurston | Mathematics | 1974 | 1982 |
| Shing-Tung Yau | Mathematics | 1974 | 1982 |
| Michael H. Freedman | Mathematics | 1980 | 1986 |
| Vaughan Jones | Mathematics | 1983 | 1990 |
| Curtis T. McMullen | Mathematics | 1988 | 1998 |
| Andrea M. Ghez | Physics | 1996 | 2020 |
| Vladimir Voevodsky | Mathematics | 1997 | 2002 |
| Andrei Okounkov | Mathematics | 2000 | 2006 |
| Terence Tao | Mathematics | 1999 | 2006 |
| David MacMillan | Chemistry | 2002 | 2021 |
| Guido Imbens | Economics | 1995 | 2021 |
| Moungi Bawendi | Chemistry | 1994 | 2023 |
| John Hopfield | Physics | 1962 | 2024 |

== See also ==
- List of chemistry awards
- List of computer science awards
- List of economics awards
- List of mathematics awards
- List of physics awards
