= Headless guitar =

Type of electric guitar

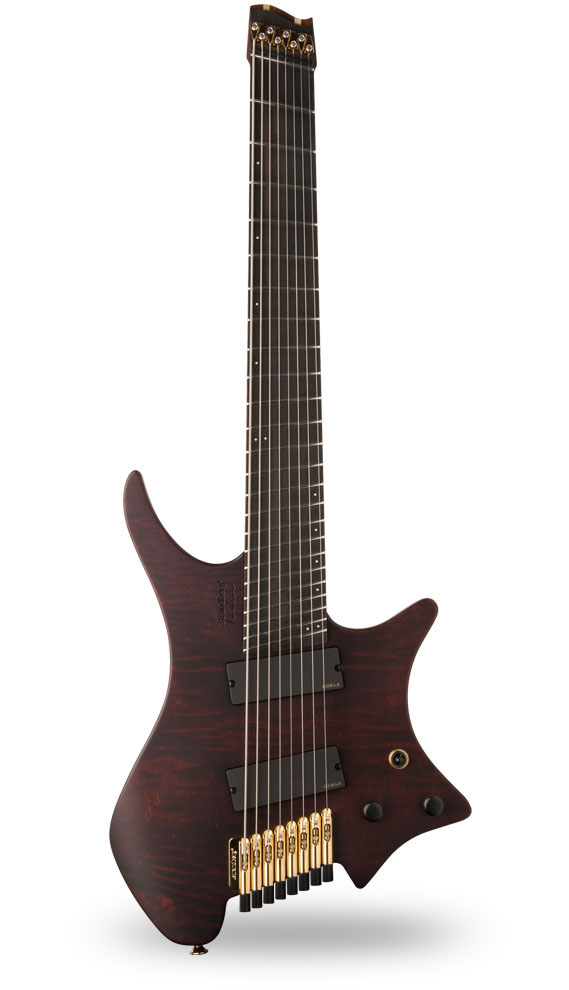
A Strandberg Boden8, an eight-string, multi-scale headless guitar.

A headless guitar is an electric guitar or bass made without a traditional headstock. While string instruments without headstocks have existed for centuries, the idea was not popularized for electric guitars and basses until the early 1980s when Steinberger began producing them. Headless guitars typically employ unique bridge and nut designs to accommodate loading strings, with tuning performed at the bridge. They often use unorthodox body shapes that prioritize ergonomics. Since their popular reemergence in the 2010s, headless guitars have become largely associated with music genres that require high levels of technical precision, like progressive metal.

== History ==
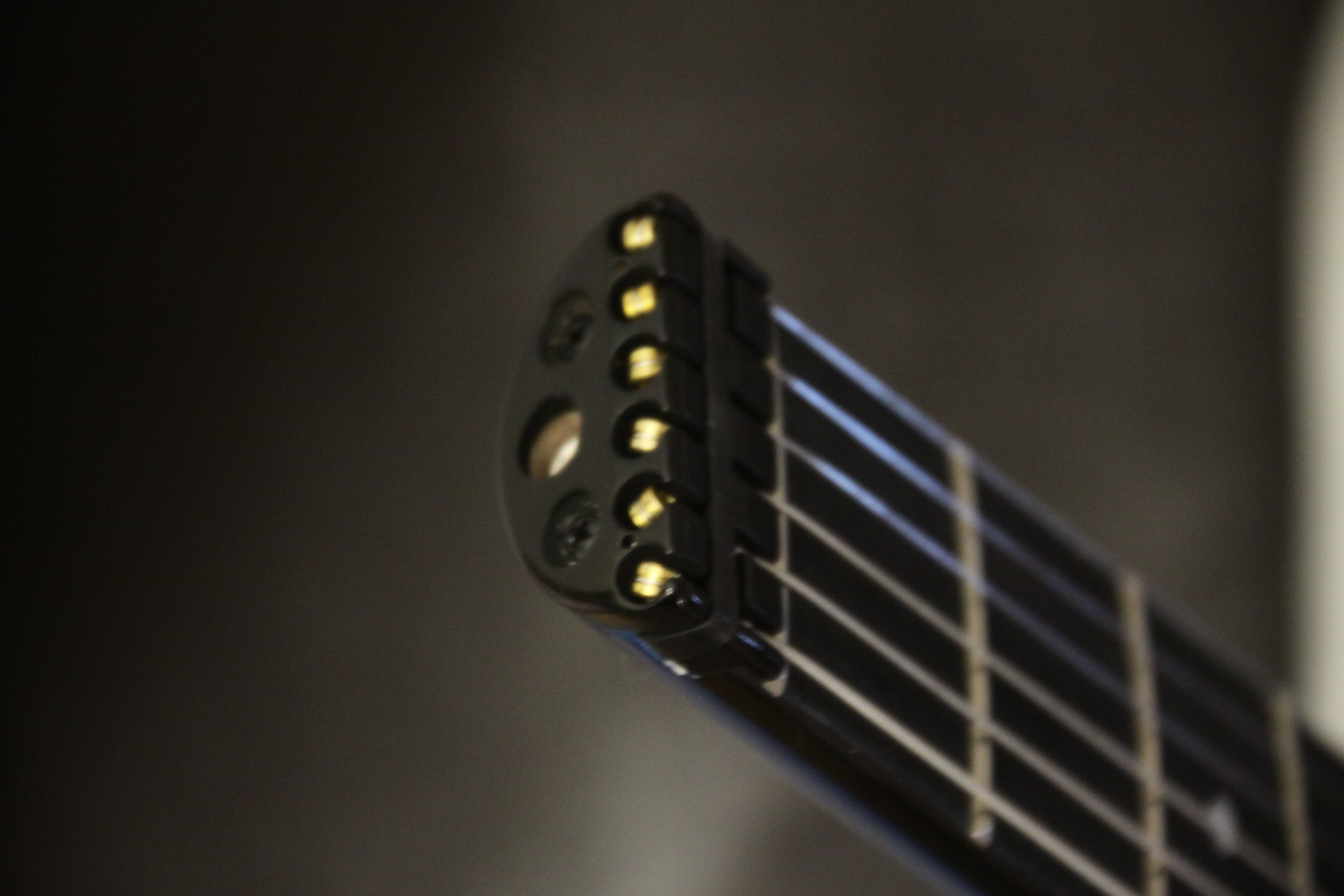
The end of a Steinberger guitar's neck, showing the ball ends of the strings. Other brands' headless guitars load strings through the bridge and lock them at the nut.

Furniture maker Ned Steinberger is often credited with pioneering headless designs in the early 1980s. Having already collaborated with Stuart Spector on the NS-2 bass guitar, Steinberger felt further improvements could be made. To address the common issue of "neck dive"—the tendency of bass guitars to tip forward due to their long, heavy necks—Steinberger decided on a novel solution: to move the tuners to the bridge and omit the headstock entirely. This decision, as well as his use of carbon fiber materials and a small, paddle-shaped body, proved off-putting to the companies he shopped his new design to, and Steinberger reluctantly decided to create his own company to bring his ideas to players. Steinberger debuted his first headless basses at the 1980 NAMM Show and followed with headless electric guitar models two years later. Players like Allan Holdsworth, Mike Rutherford, and Reeves Gabrels soon began playing them, which gave the brand enough exposure for Steinberger to sell his business to Gibson. Holdsworth dubbed headless guitars the industry's "most significant development in the last fifty years" in a 1989 interview.

In the 1990s, tastes in guitar-based music—and equipment—changed abruptly. Headless guitars became widely dismissed as a gimmick by a new generation of musicians, while established Steinberger players like Geddy Lee and Sting returned to using more traditional instruments. One exception was Cynic guitarist Paul Masvidal, whose use of headless guitars during this time introduced them to the extreme metal community. Masvidal was also an early endorser of Strandberg Guitars, which was founded in 2012 with a focus on improving ergonomics through rethinking traditional guitar design, including using headless construction inspired by Steinberger. Starting with the brand's first model, the Boden, Strandberg's work helped de-stigmatized headless guitars and became highly popular in the progressive metal genre thanks to Chris Letchford, Tosin Abasi, and Misha Mansoor.

Ibanez, Schecter, and Kiesel, among other companies, subsequently introduced their own headless guitar models in a "boom" that Guitar World credited to Strandberg. Unlike in the 1980s, however, when Steinberger's guitars and basses were a highly niche product that quickly fell out of favor, demand has remained high for headless guitars in Strandberg's wake, with a much larger retail presence—in large part thanks to Ibanez—and enough notable musicians and experimental builders to maintain the headless concept's legitimacy.

== Purpose ==
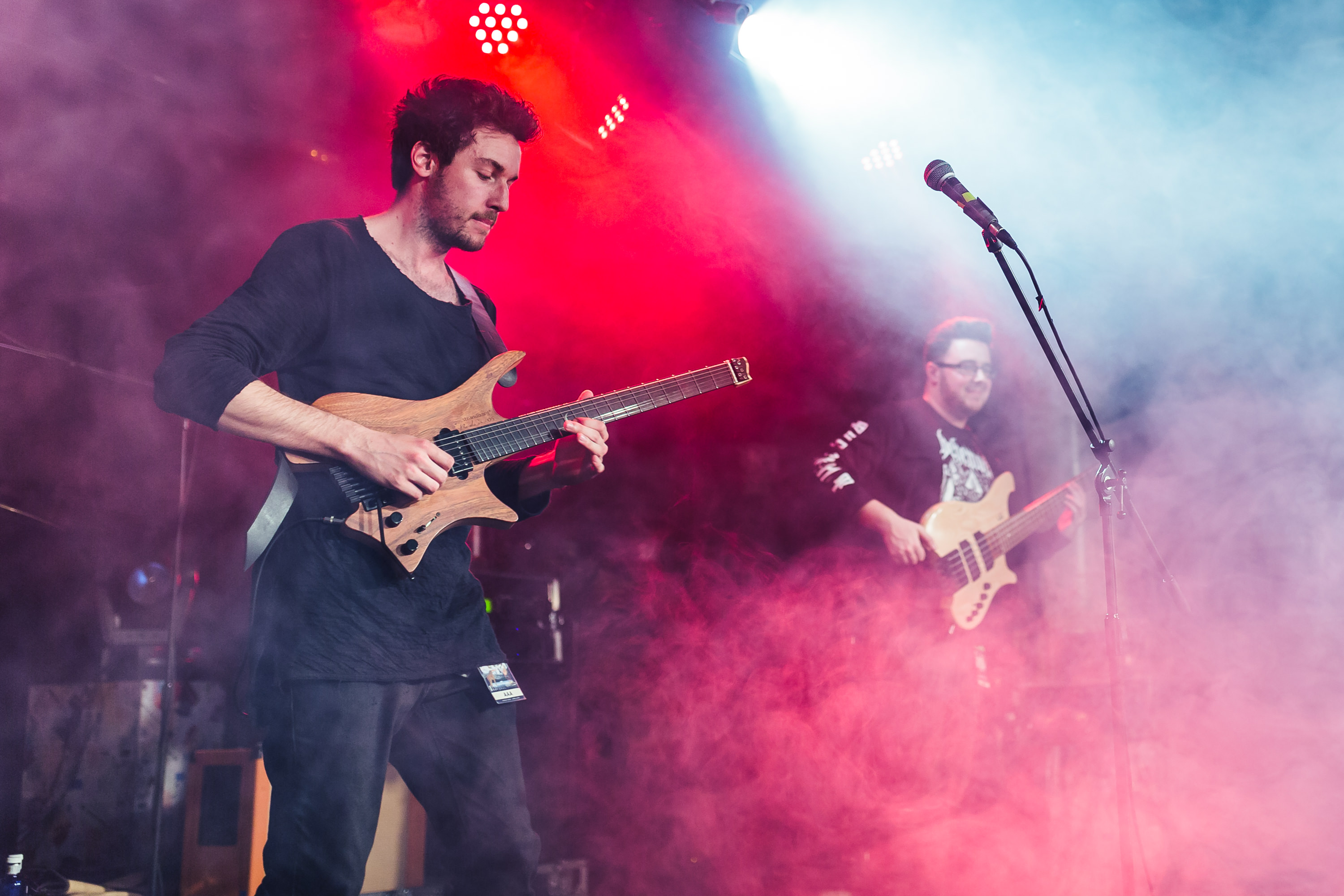
Plini playing a Strandberg

With the advent of solidbody electric guitars and basses, the traditional headstock arguably became obsolete: unlike acoustic guitars with their thin tops, solidbody guitars had the structural integrity to support geared metal tuners integrated into the bridge. Installing tuners in the bridge of an acoustic also would have severely dampened the resonance of the top, another issue rendered moot on a solidbody instrument. With no headstock to accommodate tuners, the majority of headless guitars have the strings threaded through the bridge and locked in place at the nut, where the excess string length can be trimmed. Steinberger guitars are an exception, using special strings with ball ends on both sides.

There are several advantages of headless guitars and basses. The initial goal was achieving better weight balance with basses, as the reduction in weight of the neck—and conversely, the increase in weight of the bridge—meant bassists would no longer have to actively support the neck with their fretting hand while playing. Removing the headstock and transferring tuning to the bridge also maintains string tension more effectively, while the locking nut and lack of gears in the tuners prevents slippage for more stable tuning and shortens the time it takes to re-string the instrument. Some headless guitars use a zero fret, which means open notes will sound similar to fretted notes, although many players do not prefer this.

Following its introduction on electric basses, the headless idea was then extended to electric guitars, where headless construction became part of a larger conversation around improving ergonomics. Manufacturers like Steinberger and Strandberg notably use lighter materials and explore unorthodox, compact body shapes to further reduce weight and position against a player's body more comfortably. These often "weird and beautiful" designs, as described by Plini, are a large part of these instruments' appeal among fans. Ola Strandberg though has said the industry's tendency toward sci-fi-style designs was the primary reason players outside of metal were not gravitating toward headless models, despite their advantages. Masvidal described how using headless guitars affected his playing: "I had no issues with [there being] no headstock. To me, it was groundbreaking. Those guitars felt alien, and I felt like an alien. It was also when my playing started to go into new places. My harmonic vocabulary and soloing style expanded. I started to feel like I was onto something, and that was somehow in tandem with this instrument. With Focus, a voice was emerging, and the headless guitar was the beginning of that for me."

The headless design also allows guitars to be more compact. Some travel guitars omit headstocks in addition to using a collapsible framework to pack as small as possible.
