= Strandberg Guitars =

Swedish guitar and bass manufacturer

- Type: Private
- Industry: Musical instruments
- Founded: 2012; 14 years ago
- Founder: Ola Strandberg
- Headquarters: Uppsala, Sweden
- Area served: Worldwide
- Products: Electric guitars, basses
- Website: strandbergguitars.com/en-US

Strandberg Guitars, stylized as .strandberg*, is a Swedish manufacturer of electric guitars and basses founded in 2012 by Ola Strandberg. The company is known for its unorthodox designs that focus on improved ergonomics and for popularizing headless guitars in the metal community. Guitar World included Strandberg's flagship Boden model in its 2025 list of the 50 greatest pieces of guitar gear of the century so far.

== History ==
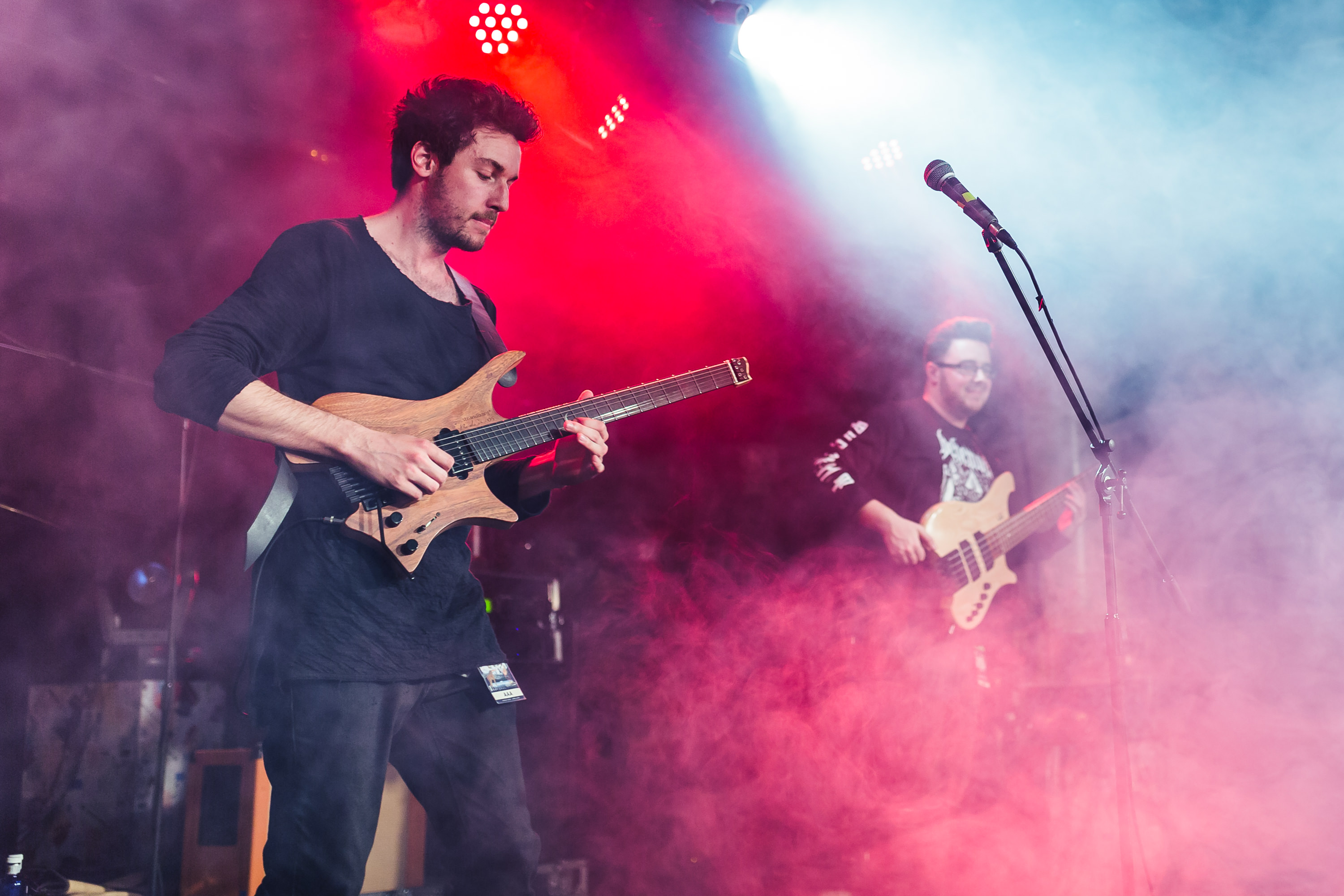
Plini playing a Strandberg

Ola Strandberg began building guitars as a childhood hobby, inspired by Allan Holdsworth having built a guitar from jelutong, an atypical choice as a luthier. Strandberg studied mechanical engineering in school and had his first job in a workshop, learning metalwork and CAD drawing. He later moved into administrative software design and then product management marketing. By this point, Strandberg was experiencing a midlife crisis and found a distraction in returning to guitar building. He was fascinated by Steinberger's headless guitar designs and hardware of the 1980s, but wanted to improve the player experience through incorporating more ergonomic design principles. In particular, he wanted to improve balance and use a neck shape that promotes more natural wrist and hand positioning. Strandberg secretly built his prototype guitar in the basement workshop of the biotech company he worked for in 2007. While his work garnered interest online, it was not until he created his EndurNeck profile in 2012 that Strandberg felt confident enough to found his namesake company. Finding a contractor to build his guitars, however, took time and it was not until 2014 that Strandberg's first batch of mass-produced instruments was released.

With their ergonomic focus and "game-changing" neck profiles, Strandberg quickly established a reputation as one of the most forward-thinking brands in the industry. While brands like Steinberger had previously experimented with headless guitars, the concept was not widely accepted until Strandberg resurrected and legitimized the idea. Companies like Ibanez, Schecter, and Kiesel subsequently introduced new headless guitar models in a "boom" that Guitar World credited to Strandberg. The company's guitars have been used by artists like Plini, Jacob Collier, and Jordan Rudess, and are considered a "go-to" in the progressive metal genre.

== Design ==
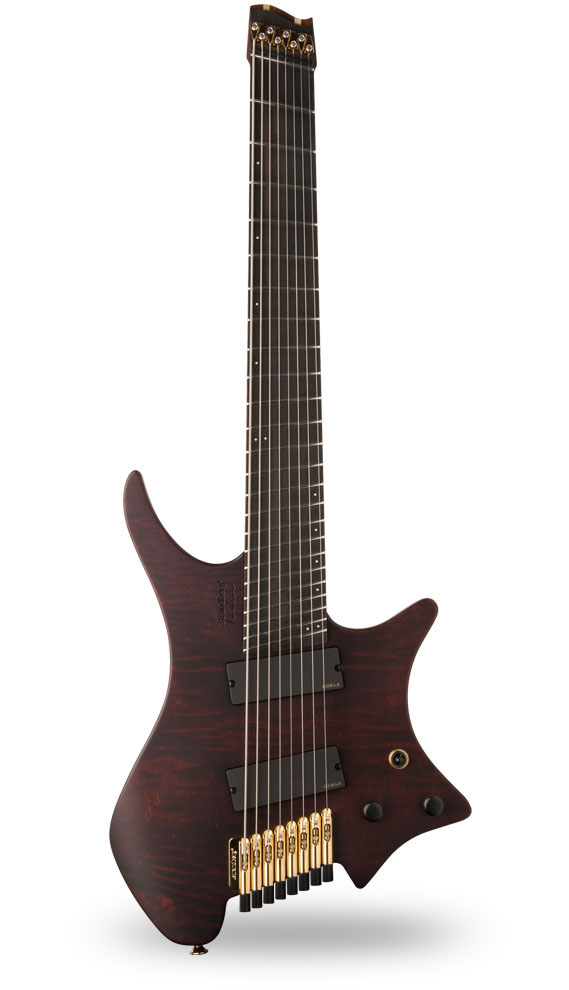
A Boden eight-string guitar

Ola Strandberg has stated that his company's identity stems from innovation over tradition. According to him, "It was never about reinventing the guitar for the sake of novelty, it was about removing anything that didn't help you make music, and refining everything that did." To that end, he developed new construction techniques, prioritized lighter materials, and engineered new hardware in the name of optimizing comfort and playability.

One of Strandberg's most identifying design elements is the omission of a traditional headstock. While this has become a popular trend in the industry, Ola Strandberg noted that his guitars are designed from the ground up for this purpose, whereas other manufacturers have capitalized on the trend by simply removing the headstock on existing models and changing the hardware. This headless construction reduces weight and promotes better balance and tuning stability. Another identifying feature is the brand's EndurNeck profile, which uses flat surfaces in an asymmetrical trapezoidal shape rather than a traditional rounded shape. This shape, inspired by a TV remote, promotes a more "restful" grip that aids performance.

Models like the brand's flagship Boden series also use a radically different bodyshape that Music Radar likened to a puddle drawn by Salvador Dalí.
