= Jack Steinberger =

German-American physicist, Nobel laureate (1921–2020)

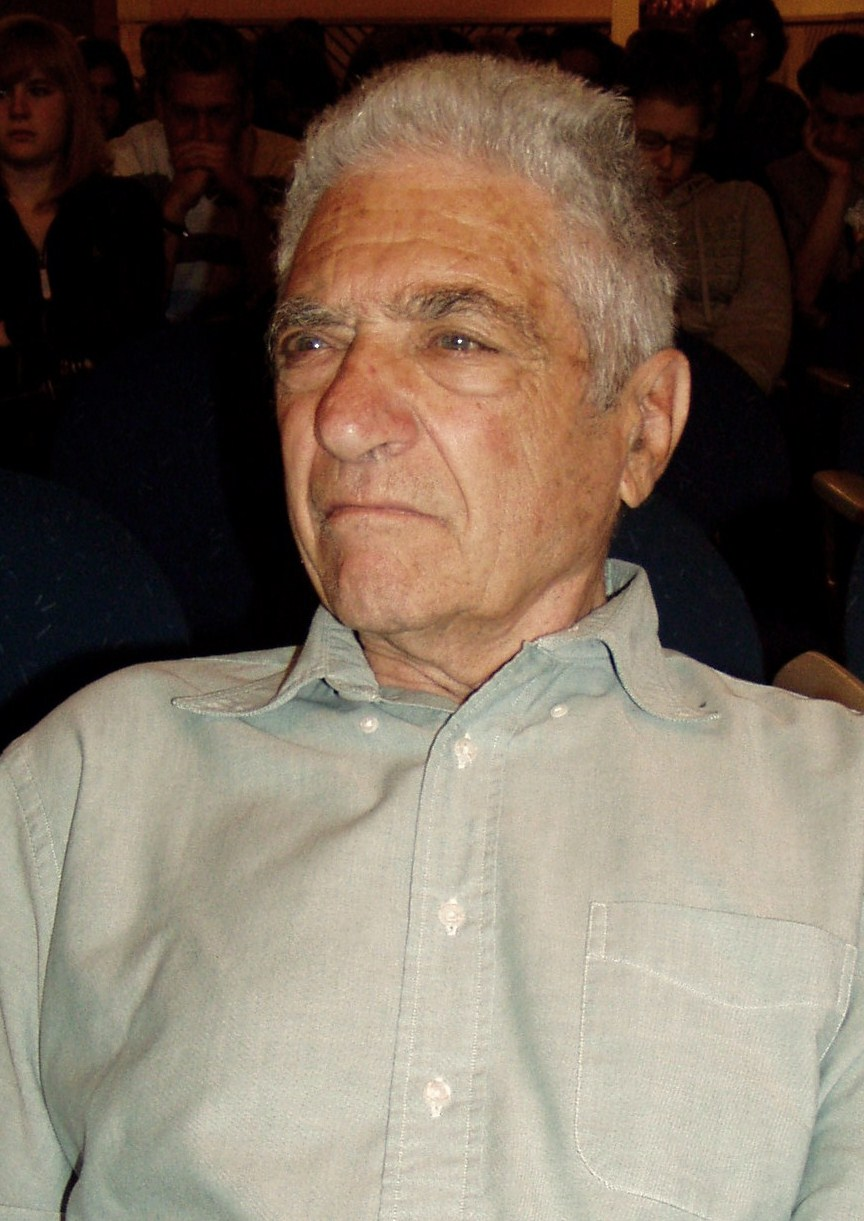
- Steinberger in 2008
- Born: Hans Jakob Steinberger; May 25, 1921; Bad Kissingen, Germany
- Died: December 12, 2020 (aged 99); Geneva, Switzerland
- Education: University of Chicago
- Known for: Discovery of the muon neutrino
- Spouse(s): Cynthia Alff; Joan Beauregard (1920-2009)
- Children: 4, including Joseph, Ned, Julia, and John
- Awards: Nobel Prize in Physics (1988); National Medal of Science (1988); Matteucci Medal (1990)
- Scientific career
- Fields: Particle physics
- Workplaces: University of California, Berkeley; Columbia University; CERN
- Thesis: On the range of the electrons in meson decay. (1949)
- Academic advisors: Edward Teller; Enrico Fermi
- Notable students: Melvin Schwartz; Eric L. Schwartz; Theodore Modis; David R. Nygren

Jack Steinberger (born Hans Jakob Steinberger; May 25, 1921 – December 12, 2020) was a German-born American physicist noted for his work with neutrinos, the subatomic particles considered to be elementary constituents of matter. He was a recipient of the 1988 Nobel Prize in Physics, along with Leon M. Lederman and Melvin Schwartz, for the discovery of the muon neutrino. Through his career as an experimental particle physicist, he held positions at the University of California, Berkeley, Columbia University (1950–68), and the CERN (1968–86). He was also a recipient of the United States National Medal of Science in 1988, and the Matteucci Medal from the Italian Academy of Sciences in 1990.

== Early life and education ==
Steinberger was born in the city of Bad Kissingen in Bavaria, Germany, on May 25, 1921, into a Jewish family. The rise of Nazism in Germany, with its open anti-Semitism, prompted his parents, Ludwig Lazarus (a cantor and religious teacher) and Berta May Steinberger, to send him out of the country.

Steinberger emigrated to the United States at the age of 13, making the trans-Atlantic trip with his brother Herbert. Jewish charities in the U.S. arranged for Barnett Farroll to care for him as a foster child. Steinberger attended New Trier Township High School, in Winnetka, Illinois. He was reunited with his parents and younger brother in 1938.

Steinberger studied chemical engineering at Armour Institute of Technology (now Illinois Institute of Technology) but left after his scholarship ended to help supplement his family's income. He obtained a bachelor's degree in chemistry from the University of Chicago, in 1942. Shortly thereafter, he joined the Signal Corps at MIT. With the help of the G.I. Bill, he returned to graduate studies at the University of Chicago in 1946, where he studied under Edward Teller and Enrico Fermi. His Ph.D. thesis concerned the energy spectrum of electrons emitted in muon decay; his results showed that this was a three-body decay, and implied the participation of two neutral particles in the decay (later identified as the electron ($\nu_e$) and muon ($\nu_\mu$) neutrinos) rather than one.

== Career ==
=== Early research ===
After receiving his doctorate, Steinberger attended the Institute for Advanced Study in Princeton for a year. In 1949 he published a calculation of the lifetime of the neutral pion, which anticipated the study of anomalies in quantum field theory.

Following Princeton, in 1949, Steinberger went to the Radiation Lab at the University of California at Berkeley, where he performed an experiment which demonstrated the production of neutral pions and their decay to photon pairs. This experiment utilized the 330 MeV synchrotron and the newly invented scintillation counters. Despite this and other achievements, he was asked to leave the Radiation Lab at Berkeley in 1950, due to his refusal to sign the so-called non-Communist Oath.

Steinberger accepted a faculty position at Columbia University in 1950. The newly commissioned meson beam at Nevis Labs provided the tool for several important experiments. Measurements of the production cross-section of pions on various nuclear targets showed that the pion has odd parity. A direct measurement of the production of pions on a liquid hydrogen target, then not a common tool, provided the data needed to show that the pion has spin zero. The same target was used to observe the relatively rare decay of neutral pions to a photon, an electron, and a positron. A related experiment measured the mass difference between the charged and neutral pions based on the angular correlation between the neutral pions produced when the negative pion is captured by the proton in the hydrogen nucleus. Other important experiments studied the angular correlation between electron–positron pairs in neutral pion decays, and established the rare decay of a charged pion to an electron and neutrino; the latter required use of a liquid-hydrogen bubble chamber.

=== Investigations of strange particles ===
During 1954–1955, Steinberger contributed to the development of the bubble chamber with the construction of a 15 cm device for use with the Cosmotron at Brookhaven National Laboratory. The experiment used a pion beam to produce pairs of hadrons with strange quarks to elucidate the puzzling production and decay properties of these particles. In 1956, he used a 30 cm chamber outfitted with three cameras to discover the neutral Sigma hyperon and measure its mass. This observation was important for confirming the existence of the SU(3) flavor symmetry which hypothesizes the existence of the strange quark.

An important characteristic of the weak interaction is its violation of parity symmetry. This characteristic was established through the measurement of the spins and parities of many hyperons. Steinberger and his collaborators contributed several such measurements using large (75 cm) liquid-hydrogen bubble chambers and separated hadron beams at Brookhaven. One example is the measurement of the invariant mass distribution of electron–positron pairs produced in the decay of Sigma-zero hyperons to Lambda-zero hyperons.

=== Neutrinos and the weak neutral current ===
In the 1960s, the emphasis in the study of the weak interaction shifted from strange particles to neutrinos. Leon Lederman, Steinberger and Schwartz built large spark chambers at Nevis Labs and exposed them in 1961 to neutrinos produced in association with muons in the decays of charged pions and kaons. They used the Alternating Gradient Synchrotron (AGS) at Brookhaven, and obtained a number of convincing events in which muons were produced, but no electrons. This result, for which they received the Nobel Prize in 1988, proved the existence of a type of neutrino associated with the muon, distinct from the neutrino produced in beta decay.

=== Study of CP violation ===
The CP violation (charge conjugation and parity) was established in the neutral kaon system in 1964. Steinberger recognized that the phenomenological parameter epsilon (ε) which quantifies the degree of CP violation could be measured in interference phenomena (See CP violation). In collaboration with Carlo Rubbia, he performed an experiment while on sabbatical at CERN during 1965 which demonstrated robustly the expected interference effect, and also measured precisely the difference in mass of the short-lived and long-lived neutral kaon masses.

Back in the United States, Steinberger conducted an experiment at Brookhaven to observe CP violation in the semi-leptonic decays of neutral kaons. The charge asymmetry relates directly to the epsilon parameter, which was thereby measured precisely. This experiment also allowed the deduction of the phase of epsilon, and confirmed that CPT is a good symmetry of nature.

=== CERN ===
In 1968, Steinberger left Columbia University and accepted a position as a department director at CERN. He constructed an experiment there utilizing multi-wire proportional chambers (MWPC), recently invented by Georges Charpak. The MWPCs, augmented by micro-electronic amplifiers, allowed much larger samples of events to be recorded. Several results for neutral kaons were obtained and published in the early 1970s, including the observation of the rare decay of the neutral kaon to a muon pair, the time dependence of the asymmetry for semi-leptonic decays, and a more-precise measurement of the neutral kaon mass difference. A new era in experimental technique was opened.

These new techniques proved crucial for the first demonstration of direct CP-violation. The NA31 experiment at CERN was built in the early 1980s using the CERN SPS 400 GeV proton synchrotron. As well as banks of MWPCs and a hadron calorimeter, it featured a liquid argon electromagnetic calorimeter with exceptional spatial and energy resolution. NA31 showed that direct CP violation is real.

Steinberger worked on the ALEPH experiment at the Large Electron–Positron Collider (LEP), where he served as the experiment's spokesperson. Among the ALEPH experiment's initial accomplishments was the precise measurement of the number of families of leptons and quarks in the Standard Model through the measurement of the decays of the Z boson.

He retired from CERN in 1986, and went on to become a professor at the Scuola Normale Superiore di Pisa in Italy. He continued his association with the CERN laboratory through his visits into his 90s.

=== Nobel Prize ===
Steinberger was awarded the Nobel Prize in Physics in 1988, "for the neutrino beam method and the demonstration of the doublet structure of the leptons through the discovery of the muon neutrino". He shared the prize with Leon M. Lederman and Melvin Schwartz; at the time of the research, all three experimenters were at Columbia University.

The experiment used charged pion beams generated with the Alternating Gradient Synchrotron at Brookhaven National Laboratory. The pions decayed to muons which were detected in front of a steel wall; the neutrinos were detected in spark chambers installed behind the wall. The coincidence of muons and neutrinos demonstrated that a second kind of neutrino was created in association with muons. Subsequent experiments proved this neutrino to be distinct from the first kind (electron-type). Steinberger, Lederman and Schwartz published their work in Physical Review Letters in 1962.

He gave his Nobel medal to New Trier High School in Winnetka, Illinois (USA), of which he was an alumnus.

He was also awarded the National Medal of Science in 1988, by the then US president, Ronald Reagan and was the recipient of the Matteucci Medal in 1990, from the Italian Academy of Sciences.

== Selected publications ==
- Steinberger, J. & A. S. Bishop. "The Detection of Artificially Produced Photomesons with Counters", Radiation Laboratory, University of California-Berkeley, United States Department of Energy (through predecessor agency the Atomic Energy Commission), (March 8, 1950).
- Steinberger, J., W. K. H. Panofsky & J. Steller. "Evidence for the Production of Neutral Mesons by Photons", Radiation Laboratory, University of California-Berkeley, United States Department of Energy (through predecessor agency the Atomic Energy Commission), (April 1950).
- Panofsky, W. K. H., J. Steinberger & J. Steller. "Further Results on the Production of Neutral Mesons by Photons", Radiation Laboratory, University of California-Berkeley, United States Department of Energy (through predecessor agency the Atomic Energy Commission), (October 1, 1950).
- Steinberger, J. "Experimental Survey of Strange Particle Decays", Columbia University, Nevis Laboratories, United States Department of Energy (through predecessor agency the Atomic Energy Commission), (June 1964).
- Steinberger, J. (2005). Learning about particles : 50 privileged years. Berlin: Springer. ISBN 3-540-21329-5. OCLC 56654442.

== Personal life ==
Steinberger's first marriage to Joan Beauregard ended in a divorce, after which he married his former student, biologist Cynthia Alff. He had four children, two from each of his marriages. His son Ned Steinberger is the founder of the eponymous company for headless guitars and basses, and his daughter Julia Steinberger is an ecological economist at the University of Lausanne. As an atheist and a humanist, Steinberger was a Humanist Laureate in the International Academy of Humanism. In his own words, he is noted to have enjoyed tennis, mountaineering and sailing.

In the 1980s Steinberger resumed relations with his native town Bad Kissingen. He often visited Bad Kissingen after that. The school he had attended there was named Jack-Steinberger-Gymnasium in 2001. In 2006 Steinberger was made honorary citizen of Bad Kissingen. "I feel welcome in Bad Kissingen. This is my hometown and I was raised there. I feel as a German again now" he told the Bavarian broadcasting company Bayerischer Rundfunk in 2013.

He died on December 12, 2020, at his home in Geneva. He was aged 99.

== See also ==
- List of Jewish Nobel laureates
