= Eric L. Schwartz =

Eric L. Schwartz (1947 – December 31, 2018) was Professor of Cognitive and Neural Systems, Professor of Electrical and Computer Engineering, and Professor of Anatomy and Neurobiology at Boston University. Previously, he was Associate Professor of Psychiatry at New York University Medical Center and Associate Professor of Computer Science at the Courant Institute of Mathematical Sciences at New York University.

He introduced the term Computational Neuroscience through the organization of a conference with this title which took place in Carmel, California in 1985, under the sponsorship of the Systems Development Foundation. Encouraged by program director Charles Smith, this conference (whose proceedings were later published by MIT Press (1990)) provided a summary of progress in the related fields which were until then referred to as neural networks, neural modeling, brain theory, theoretical neuroscience and a variety of other terms. Organizing these fields along the dimensions of spatial and temporal measurement, the conference (and its later publication in book form) introduced the use of the term "Computational Neuroscience". In the subsequent decades, dozens of university departments and programs have adopted this umbrella title.

During the late 1980s Schwartz founded the Computational Neurosciences Labs, with support from the Systems Development Foundation, and then Vision Applications, Inc. in 1990, with support from the Defense Advanced Research Projects Agency (DARPA), for the purpose of developing actuators, sensors and algorithms for miniaturized space-variant vision systems. Patents developed at Vision Applications included a novel spherically actuated motor, a CMOS VLSI log-plar sensor prototype and algorithms for real-time synthesis of space-variant images.

This work culminated in the construction of a miniature autonomous vehicle which was the first vehicle to drive, unassisted by human backup, on the streets of Boston (1992).

== Biography ==
Eric Schwartz was born in New York City in 1947 to Jack and Edith Schwartz. He attended the Bronx High School of Science, Columbia College (majoring in Chemistry and Physics), where he was a member of the 1965 Ivy League, ECAC, and NCAA Championship Columbia Lions fencing team (saber), and Columbia University (PhD, High Energy Physics, spon. J. Steinberger [22]).

Following completion of his physics degree, he joined the laboratory of E. Roy John as a post-doctoral fellow in neurophysiology, and moved with John's laboratory to New York University as a Research Associate Professor of Psychiatry in 1979 and was promoted to Associate Professor of Psychiatry and Computer Science in 1990, leaving for Boston University in 1992 to assume the positions of Professor of Cognitive and Neural Systems, Electrical and Computer Engineering, and Anatomy and Neurobiology. He lived in Brookline, Massachusetts with wife Helen and daughter Anna Molly.

== Research ==
=== Visuotopic mapping in monkey and human visual cortex ===
Although it has been known since the turn of the century that the visual image recorded by the retina is relayed to visual cortex in the form of an orderly two dimensional pattern of neural firing (visuotopy, topographic mapping, retinotopy), the first two dimensional mathematical description of this mapping in primates was provided by Schwartz in 1976 and 1977, and together with collaborators Al Wolf and Dave Christman he provided the first direct visualization of human cortical retinotopy via positron tomography.

These theoretical papers demonstrated that the complex logarithmic mapping, the log-polar mapping, or the monopole mapping, was a good approximation to the retinotopy of monkey visual cortex, and was later extended to include a second logarithmic singularity to represent the peripheral visual representation, the dipole model This description, which is the current de facto standard model for the large scale functional architecture of visual cortex, was extended recently(2002–2006), with graduate students Mukund Balasubramanian and Jonathan Polimeni, to describe multiple areas of human and monkey visual cortex—the wedge dipole mapping. This model has been verified for human visual cortex, together with Jon Polimeni, Oliver Hinds, Mukund Balasubramanian and colleagues Bruce Fischl and Larry Wald, using high resolution functional magnetic resonance imaging, establishing the wedge-dipole model as one of the very few mathematical models of neuroanatomical structure with a detailed experimental verification.

=== Computerized brain flattening ===
A critical aspect of this work was the development of methods of brain flattening. The first fully accurate method of cortical flattening was developed by Schwartz in 1986, based on the computation of exact minimal geodesic distances on a polyhedral mesh representing the cortical surface, together with metric multidimensional scaling. Variants of this algorithm, especially the recent improvements contributed in the thesis work of Mukund Balasubramanian (see) underlie most current quantitatively accurate approaches to cortical flattening.

=== Cortical columnar structure ===
==== Orientation vortices ====
In 1977, Schwartz pointed out that the hypercolumn model of Hubel and Weisel implied the existence of a periodic vortex like pattern of orientation singularities across the surface of visual cortex. Specifically, the angular part of the complex logarithm function, viewed as a spatial map provided a possible explanation of the hypercolumn structure, which in current language is termed the "pinwheel" structure of visual cortex. In 1990, together with Alan Rojer, Schwartz showed that such "vortex" or "pinwheel" structures, together with the associated ocular dominance column pattern in cortex, could be caused by spatial filtering of random vector or scalar spatial noise, respectively. Prior to this work, most modeling of cortical columns was in terms of somewhat opaque and clumsy "neural network" models—bandpass-filtered noise quickly became a standard modeling technique for cortical columnar structure. In 1992, Rojer and Schwartz demonstrated that the formation of cortical orientation vortices was a topological consequence of the definition of orientation—any local correlation, including low-pass filtering, would cause apparent "vortex" formation. This observation was later used, via monte-carlo simulation of photon scattering in brain tissue, to demonstrate that much of modern optical recording "pin-wheel" structure is significantly contaminated by artifact due to the topological production and annihilation of spurious cortical pin-wheels, due to the low-pass nature of current optical recording, which has an intrinsic physical smoothing in the range of 300 micrometres.

=== Space variant active computer vision ===
In addition to this work in brain imaging and functional neuroanatomy, Schwartz has developed a number of algorithms and robotic devices, related to the field of space-variant computer vision. The key motivation for this work is the observations of detailed spatial structure in biological visual systems, related to the strongly space-variant (i.e. foveal) architecture. Algorithms for space-variant computer vision and non-linear diffusion have been developed together with students Giorgio Bonmassar[20], Bruce Fischl [19], and Leo Grady [21]. Unpublished work by George Kierstein was completed during their doctoral degree program before completion upon graduating with a Masters [See External Links for Bio].

== See also ==
- visuotopy
