= Ned Steinberger =

American inventor

- Born: Richard Ned Steinberger; 1948 (age 77–78); Princeton, US
- Occupation: Inventor
- Known for: Steinberger; NS Design

Ned Steinberger (b. Princeton, New Jersey, 1948) is an American creator of innovative musical instruments. He is most notable for pioneering headless guitars and basses, which were first introduced under his namesake brand in 1980. Steinberger contributed to the design of the first-ever Spector bass, and later founded NS Design, a company which markets and sells guitars, basses, and string instruments of his own design.

== Early life and education ==
Steinberger grew up in the New York City suburb of Hastings-on-Hudson and attended the Maryland Institute of Art, where he earned a BFA in sculpture. He completed training in furniture design at the Cooper Hewitt museum, beginning his design career creating custom cabinetry and designing commercial seating.

== Career ==
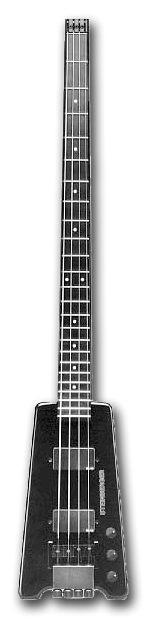
A Steinberger electric bass guitar

In 1976, while working as a member of the Brooklyn Woodworkers Co-op in a shared factory space, he became interested in the guitars and basses that fellow co-op member Stuart Spector was building. Steinberger offered to help design a bass, resulting in his first instrument (and Spector's first NS bass guitar, the NS-1, introduced in 1977, followed by its two-pickup variant, the NS-2, introduced two years later. The Spector NS quickly became and has remained Spector’s most popular bass guitar design.

Inspired by that first creation, Steinberger set out to maximize ergonomics and functionality in a bass guitar design. His search led to alternate materials, like carbon fiber and the headless concept. Together with Robert Young, Hap Kuffner and Stanley Jay, he founded Steinberger Sound in 1980. The company found immediate success with the L2 bass, and Steinberger headless guitars and other bass models followed.

In 1987, Steinberger sold his namesake company to Gibson, and remained with the company for several years. The company continued to manufacture guitars until production was halted in 1998.

In 1990 Steinberger started a new company, NS Design. NS Design continues Ned Steinberger's designs with a family of bowed electric instruments as well as headless guitars and basses.

In 2022, Gibson announced that Ned Steinberger was again collaborating with the company, and a new Ned Steinberger-designed model would be announced.

== Personal life ==
Steinberger's father is 1988 physics Nobel laureate Jack Steinberger (born May 25, 1921 in Germany – December 12, 2020) and his mother was artist Joan Beauregard. His half-sister is ecological economist Julia Steinberger.

== See also ==
- Steinberger
