= Spector (company) =

Bass guitar manufacturing company

Spector Musical Instruments
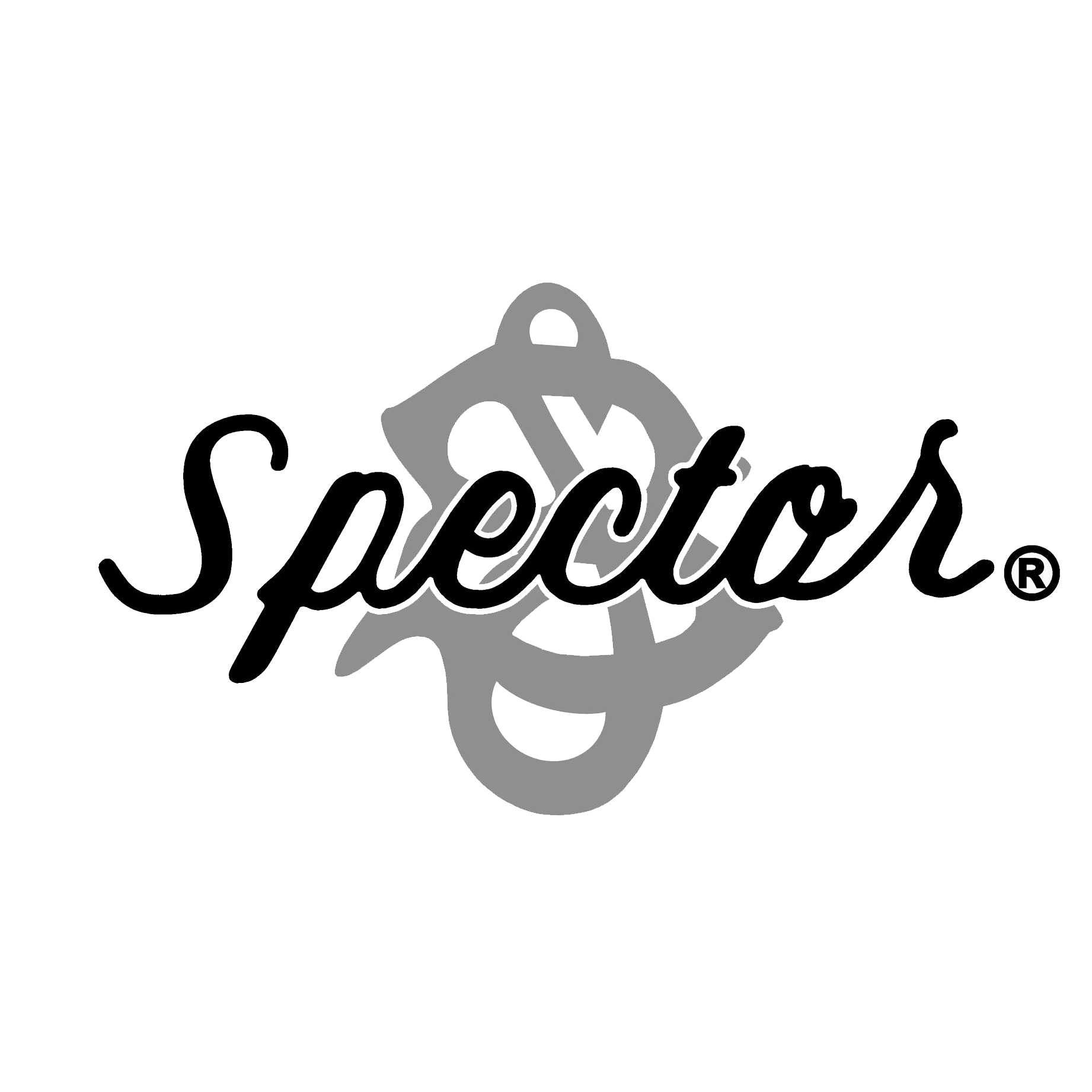
- Formerly: Stuart Spector Designs, LTD
- Industry: Musical instruments
- Founded: 1976; 50 years ago in Brooklyn, New York, United States
- Founder: Stuart Spector
- Headquarters: Shokan, New York, United States
- Area served: Worldwide
- Key people: Stuart Spector; PJ Rubal
- Products: Bass guitars, guitars
- Parent: Korg
- Website: www.spectorbass.com

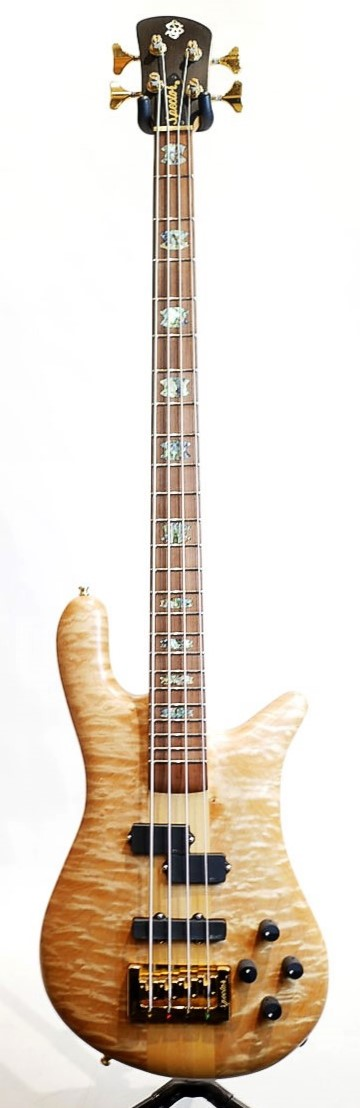
Debuted in 1979, the NS-2 is Spector's most recognized instrument.

Spector Musical Instruments (or simply Spector) is an American manufacturer of musical instruments. While Spector has produced electric and acoustic guitars, it is best known for its solid-body electric basses, particularly the NS-2. The company was founded by Stuart Spector in 1976 in Brooklyn, New York. Its current headquarters are in Shokan, New York.

== History ==
=== Origins ===
Spector Guitars was founded in Brooklyn, New York in 1976 by Stuart Spector and Alan Charney, both of whom were members of the Brooklyn Woodworkers Co-op that shared space in an old factory building at 444 12th Street in the Park Slope area. It was there that Stuart learned machine woodworking from Billy Thomas, a friend and founder of the co-op. Business started in 1976 with sales to Gracin Music on 48th St in NYC. Both G-1 electric guitars and SB-1 basses, designed by Stuart, were in the original product line.

Among the other members of the co-op was Ned Steinberger, who had recently completed training in furniture design at Cooper Hewitt museum. He became interested in the work Spector was doing and offered to design a bass. Ned had learned that “form follows function,” and used that philosophy in designing the NS bass guitar, with an elegant, ergonomically curved design and the neck-thru-body construction that Spector was already utilizing. The first NS-1 bass was built in March, 1977, and was later followed by the two-pickup model, the NS-2, in 1979.

=== Spector Expands ===
By 1977, Spector had expanded to renting an entire floor just below the co-op, with the first full-time employee being Vinny Fodera, who eventually went on to start his own highly esteemed line of Fodera basses.

The first venture into mass production techniques was fostered by a contract to supply replacement guitar necks for sale by the DiMarzio Company, best known today for their world-class pickups. This led to the development of equipment to sand the finished shape of the neck and advances in mounting frets. Involvement in OEM operations were curtailed in late 1982 in order to concentrate on Spector bass production. 1982 also saw the addition of Harold “Hap” Kuffner as the domestic and international sales manager for Spector, which significantly increased the number of both domestic and foreign dealers and distributors.

In addition to Spector's increasing public awareness through the broader worldwide dealer network, the brand struck pop-culture gold in 1983, when a white Spector NS-2 bass was sold to Sting, at the start of The Police's Synchronicity tour. At the peak of their popularity, The Police and Sting introduced the brand to a mainstream audience as that white NS-2 was played, photographed and filmed for the rest of the worldwide tour. Years later, that bass was donated to the museum of the Rock n’ Roll Hall of Fame in Cleveland, Ohio where it has been on display. At one point, it was displayed as one of four instruments in the Welcome Center, and stood shoulder-to-shoulder with one of Leo Fender's earliest guitars.

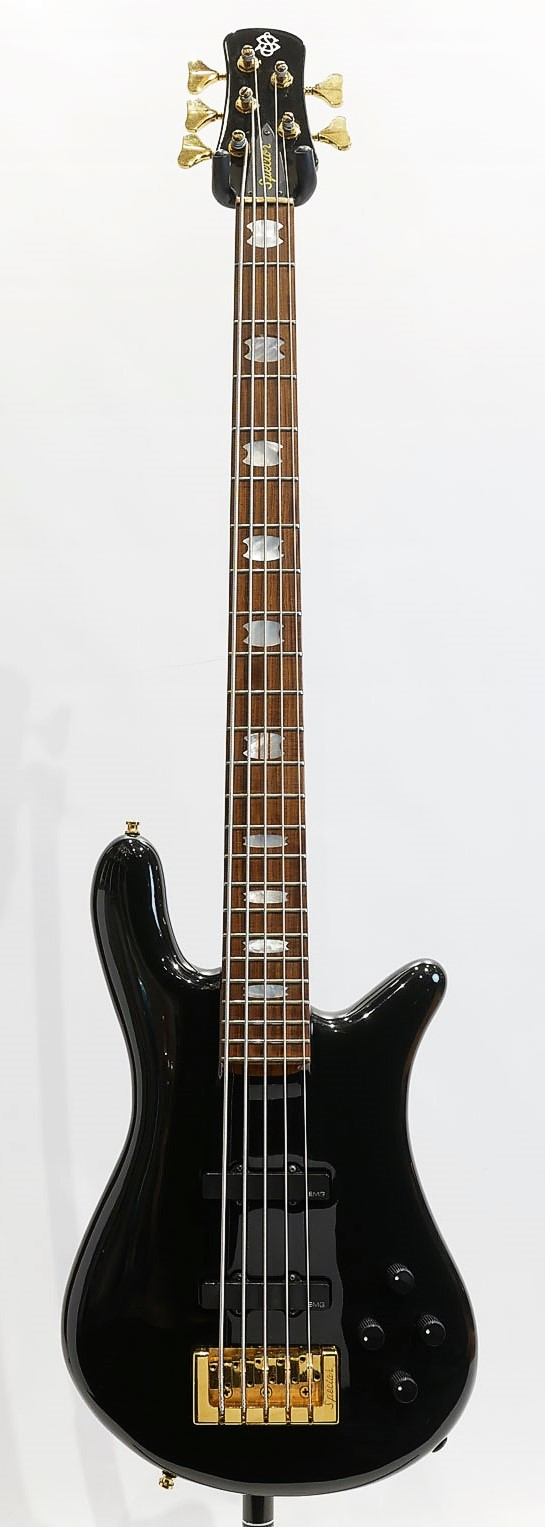
Spector NS-5 bass

=== Sale to Kramer ===
In late 1985, the Spector brand was sold to Kramer Guitars of Neptune, New Jersey, and all equipment and production were moved to the new Kramer facility. Stuart and Alan remained on as supervisors and consultants, and production was greatly expanded, reaching a maximum of 100 guitars per month. During this period, production of the NS-2 model started in Korea, providing Spector instruments to players of any budget, and enabling the brand to enter the mass market. However, by 1990, Kramer was forced into bankruptcy and all Spector production ceased.

=== After Kramer ===
In addition to the Performer models made in Asia, a consulting visit to Czechoslovakia in 1987 eventually led to a long-term relationship with a factory there that is now known as NBE Corp, and produces the Euro line of Spector basses, which are also sold worldwide.

After a two-year hiatus, Stuart started a new company as Stuart Spector Designs Ltd. near Woodstock, New York, and introduced the SD bass, which debuted at the NAMM International Music & Sound Expo in Atlantic City, New Jersey. He rented a workspace just outside of Woodstock, which is still in use today. With the addition of business partner, PJ Rubal, Stuart and PJ continued to grow the company's instrument model offerings, sales and artist roster.

By 1998 Stuart was finally able to purchase back the rights to the Spector trademark and resume producing basses in their complete, original format.

=== Sale to KORG ===
In 2015, KORG, USA took over distribution in the USA & Canada, and eventually purchased Spector Bass in 2019. Now, under the name Spector Musical Instruments, the brand is headquartered on Long Island, NY, with USA basses still coming out of the same Woodstock, NY woodshop that Stuart moved into decades ago.

=== A New Era ===
Though the model has received subtle design tweaks over the years, its signature look, tone, and playability have remained unchanged.
