= Steinberger =

Brand/Instrument associated with headless guitar design

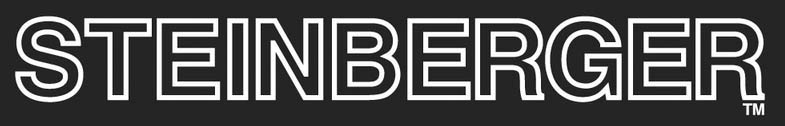
- Type: Subsidiary
- Industry: Musical instruments
- Founded: 1979; 47 years ago
- Founder: Ned Steinberger
- Headquarters: Brooklyn, New York, U.S.
- Area served: Worldwide
- Products: Electric guitar Basses
- Parent: Gibson
- Website: steinberger.com

Steinberger is a series of distinctive electric guitars and bass guitars, designed and originally manufactured by Ned Steinberger. The name is primarily associated with a minimalist "headless" design of electric basses and guitars.

== History ==
The first Steinberger basses were produced in 1979 in Brooklyn, New York by Ned Steinberger alone. While attempting to source materials in an industrial area of New York City, he visited Lane Marine, a lifeboat builder, where he met with Bob Young, an engineer with deep knowledge of carbon fiber. Though Young was more than twice Steinberger's age and had no experience with musical instruments, he joined forces with Steinberger after getting positive feedback about the instrument from his musician sons who tried it, Rory Young and Gary Young.

A company, Steinberger Sound, was set up to manufacture the basses and later the guitars on a larger scale at Newburgh, New York. The company was eventually sold to Gibson in 1987, although Steinberger remained part of the company for some time. Gibson still retains rights over the "Steinberger" name, precluding Ned Steinberger from calling his new instruments "Steinbergers". Ned Steinberger has operated a company called "NS Design" since 1990 and produces electric violin family instruments: double basses, cellos, viola, violin. An NS Bass Guitar was added later to the production line.

With changing musical fashions, complex manufacturing, and high prices putting off buyers and producers, Gibson stopped selling Steinberger guitars in the mid-1990s. Enthusiasm for the instruments later returned, leading to the instruments being sold again, although the newer versions share few commonalities with the original "Newburgh" designs.

Steinberger Spirit, a low-end line of all-wood guitars and basses, was introduced in 1992 and has been in production since, with occasional interruptions. Steinberger Synapse was introduced in 2006 and consisted of two guitars and one bass guitar model. Synapse was manufactured in South Korea for several years before production ended. As of 2026, only Steinberger Spirit guitars and basses are in production, having been manufactured for longer than any other model.

== Instrument design ==
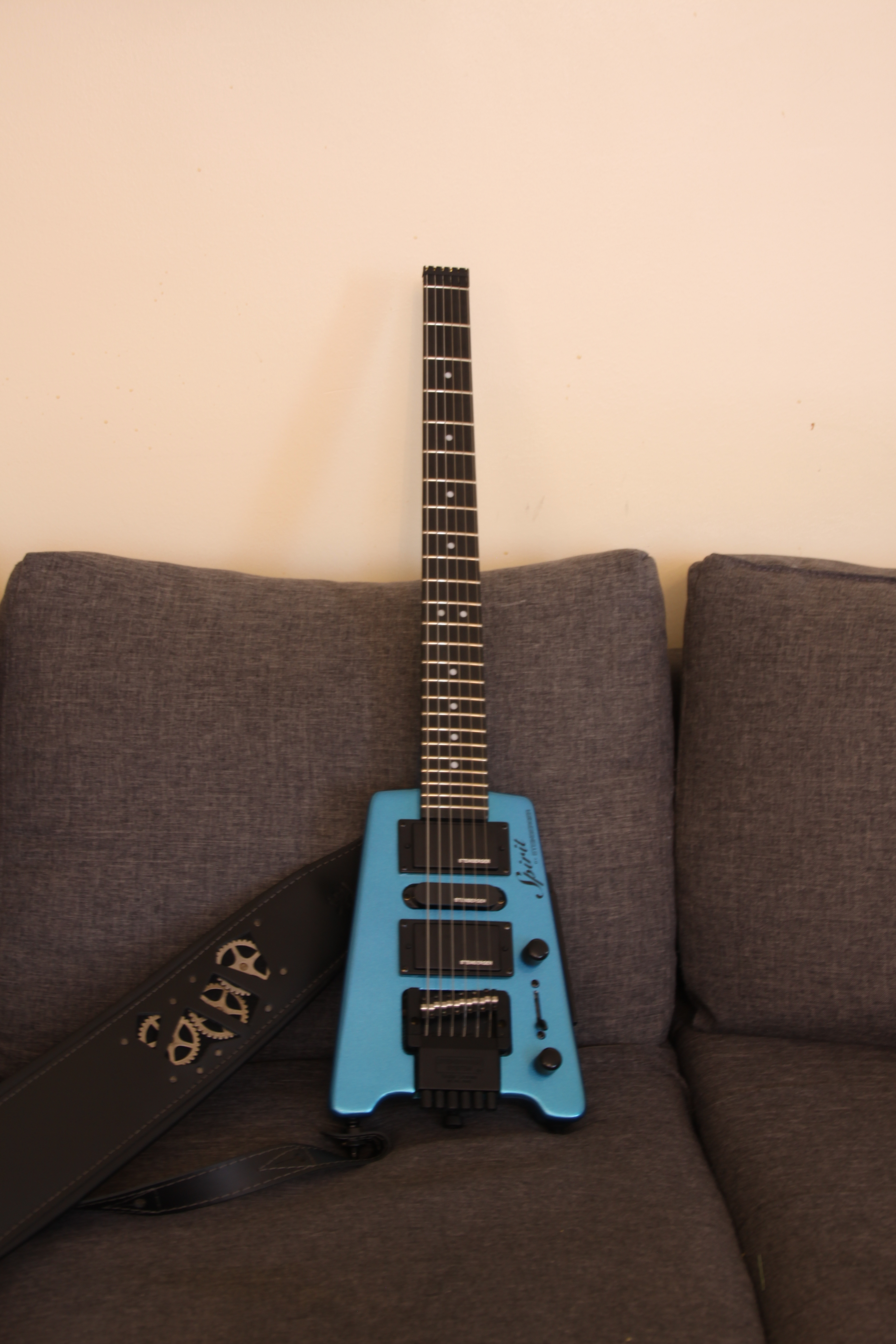
Spirit electric guitar

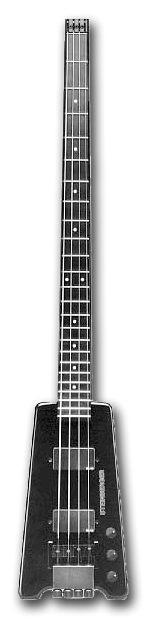
L-series bass

The best-known Steinberger design is the L-series instrument, sometimes described as shaped like a broom, boat oar, or cricket bat. Initially produced as an electric bass and later as a guitar, the instrument was made entirely of "Steinberger Blend", a "proprietary" graphite and carbon-fiber mix in two pieces: the main body and a faceplate (the "blend" being an off-the-shelf carbon fiber "system" from the DuPont product line). The headstock was eliminated, with the tuning hardware instead installed on a tailpiece mounted to the face of the guitar body. The tuners utilized a finer than normal 18:1 gear ratio, with 40 threads per inch, which gave slower but more precise adjustment and helped reduce string slippage. Depending on the tailpiece, calibrated or uncalibrated double-ball end strings were used, with the former required in order to use the transposing feature of the TransTrem vibrato unit. The rationale for the overall design was the elimination of unnecessary weight, especially the unbalanced headstock, and the use of modern materials, such as graphite, for their advantages over wood. L-series basses came with one or two pick-ups; a high-impedance DiMarzio or two low-impedance EMGs, with the L2 having two EMGs. In 1990, the design won Ned Steinberger a "Design of the Decade" award from the Industrial Designers Society of America.

The all-synthetic construction's sound drew mixed reactions from listeners, with some finding the instrument sonically clean and others describing the sound as synthetic and unnatural. Steinberger celebrates the dichotomy in one of their slogans: "We don't make 'em like they used to."

Another innovation for some of these instruments was the TransTrem, a patented (now long lapsed) transposing vibrato assembly that proportionally adjusted the string tensions to enable immediate accurate retuning of the instrument with the transposing vibrato lever. The TransTrem provided the functionality of a capo in addition to vibrato effects. Bass and guitar versions were available.

Later designs included:

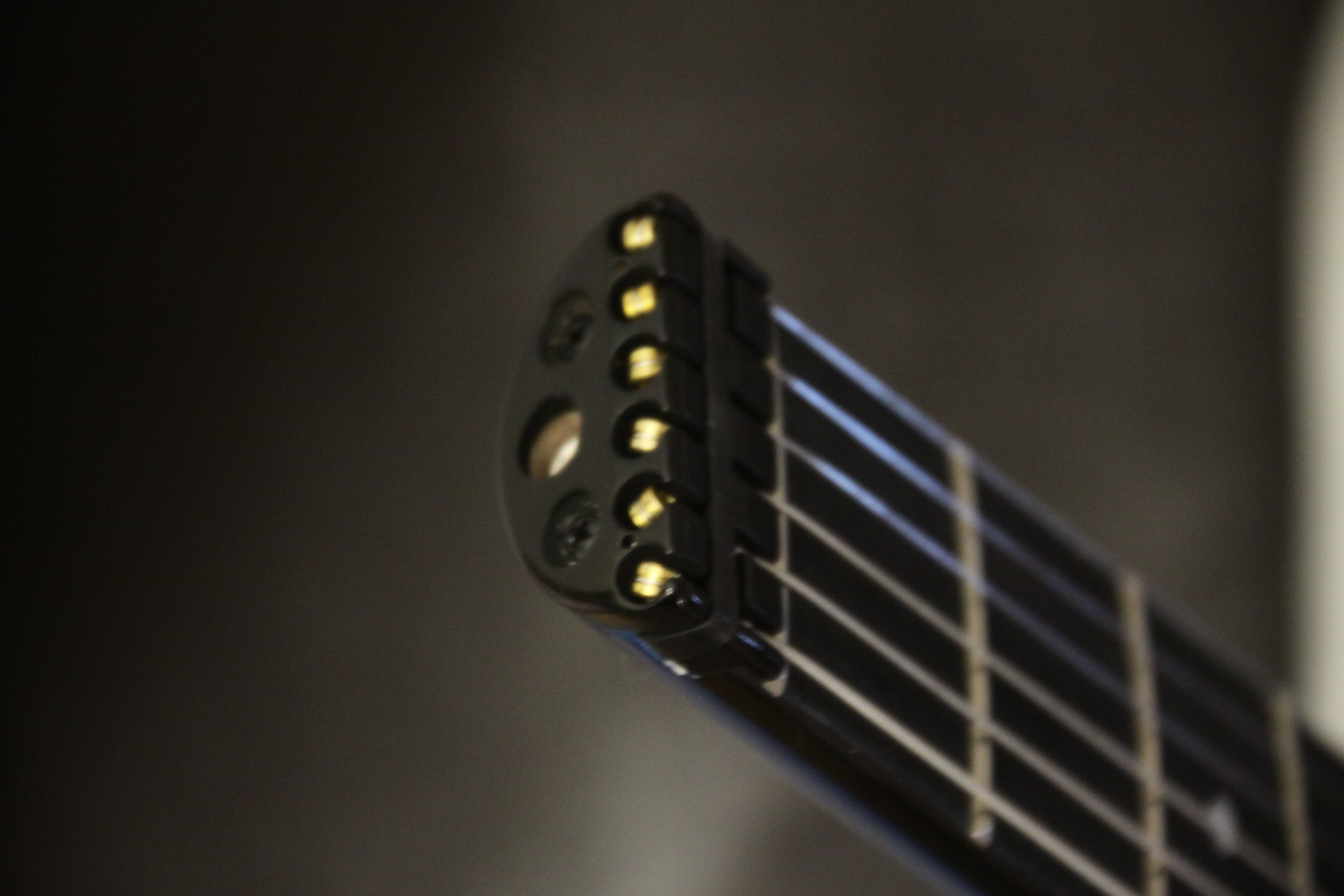
Steinberger-electric guitar's nut and the ball ends of strings

- P-series guitars and basses featured a smaller wooden body with bolt-on composite neck. The body was shaped more like an arrow or mini-A than the rectangular L series body.
- S-series featured the only Steinberger with a headstock. The S-series are very rare, with about 300–350 built. The guitar featured Ned Steinberger's 40:1 gearless tuners.
- M-series guitars and basses, designed by English luthier Roger Giffin. These had a twin-cutaway wooden body and a bolt-on graphite neck, resulting in a more traditional look, yet still with the headless tuning system and optional TransTrem.
- K-series guitars designed by American luthier Steve Klein. These featured an ergonomically designed body of non-standard shape attached to a headless graphite neck. A similar version is still made by luthier Lorenzo German, an employee of Klein who currently owns and runs Klein Electric Guitars.
- Q-series basses featured twin cutaway bodies and a bolt-on graphite neck. The body style was more modern than the M series. Introduced in 1990, the body underwent a significant revision in the mid '90s but kept the same moniker.
- Synapse guitars and basses were manufactured by Gibson under the Steinberger name, with Ned Steinberger contributing to the design. The bodies are through neck maple construction with maple wings. The truss rod is in a graphite channel with a phenolic resin fretboard. They have a non-tremolo fixed bridge. These guitars can use double ball or standard guitar strings without an adapter. Fitted with two active EMG pickups, the on-board pre-amp is able to boost and cut treble and bass frequencies. There is a mix pot for the built in piezo under the bridge pickups. The Synapse line also included a baritone guitar branded Transcale, featuring a built-in adjustable capo. By moving the capo closer to the end of the neck, one can play notes lower than standard guitar tuning without having to detune, allowing guitarists to maintain consistent tone while playing in a lower-than-standard range. The Transcale guitar can be strung with standard guitar strings or baritone strings. The Synapse series was introduced in 2006 and is no longer in production, although not formally discontinued; by 2018 the Steinberger website was no longer promoting it.
- Spirit guitars and basses were introduced in 1992, discontinued in the late 1990s, resumed production in 1999, and is the only Steinberger series currently manufactured. The bodies and necks have no carbon fiber. For current models, the bodies are neck-through construction with three-piece maple necks and basswood bodies, and fingerboards are made of "engineered hardwood". Some discontinued models have bolt-on necks. There are two current base models: GT Pro Deluxe guitar and XT-2 bass. Pickups are Steinberger-branded passive, and the tone controls are passive. Guitars have a locking tremolo rather than the Steinberger TransTrem. The GT Pro Deluxe has humbuckers in the bridge and neck positions and a single coil between them. A GT Pro Standard version, with a bridge humbucker and two single coil pickups, has been discontinued. The GT Pro Deluxe Quilt Top also has a quilted maple veneer. The XT-2 bass is available in four and five string (XT-25) versions. All guitar and bass models are available in both left and right hand versions except for the GT Pro Deluxe Quilt Top and the XT-2DB, which has a drop-tuner allowing the player to change the lowest string's tuning up or down one whole step.

Several companies licensed the headless technology from Steinberger and produced numerous all-wood clones or similar instruments. Hohner produced licensed all-wood L-series copies and Cort produced headless guitars with different body designs.

== Imitations and licensed copies ==
The Washburn Bantam was an unlicensed 1980s imitation of the Steinberger headless style. The Bantam did not require the double-ball end strings of the Steinberger.

The Hohner B2 and Jack Basses were licensed imitations, the Jack with a full wooden body, and using the same patented locking and tuning system as the L series, although without the graphite neck. As such, it required double-ball end strings in the same way as the Steinberger originals. Hohner continues to offer the G3T Steinberger licensed guitars, which have been available since "the late 1980s". The G3T is a wooden rendering of the Steinberger composite guitar in appearance, with maple neck and rosewood fingerboard, and licensed tremolo bridge.

A wooden licensed solid bass inspired by Steinberger's designs was produced by Cort Guitars in the mid-1980s.

In the early 1980s, Kramer Guitars also manufactured a headless bass called the Duke series. Although the overall form was similar to Steinberger's, the Duke series had an aluminum/wood neck and wood body. Standard geared tuning pegs were located at the bridge-end of the instrument.

== Notable players ==
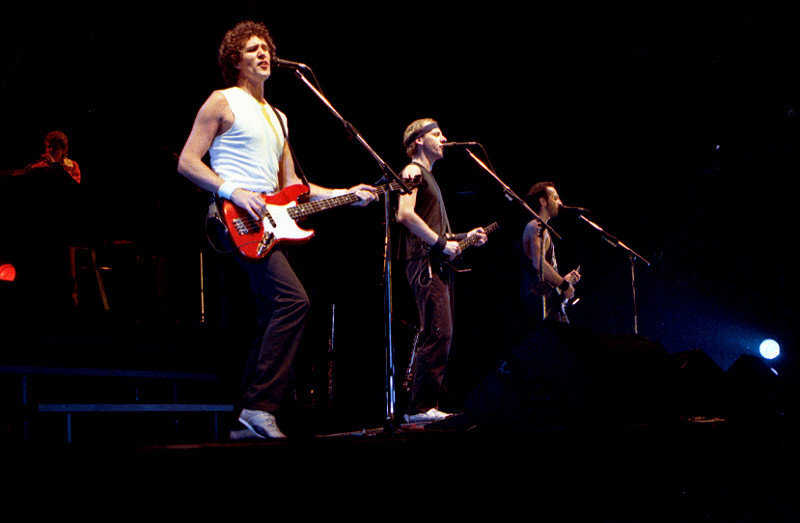
Mark Knopfler, guitarist of Dire Straits

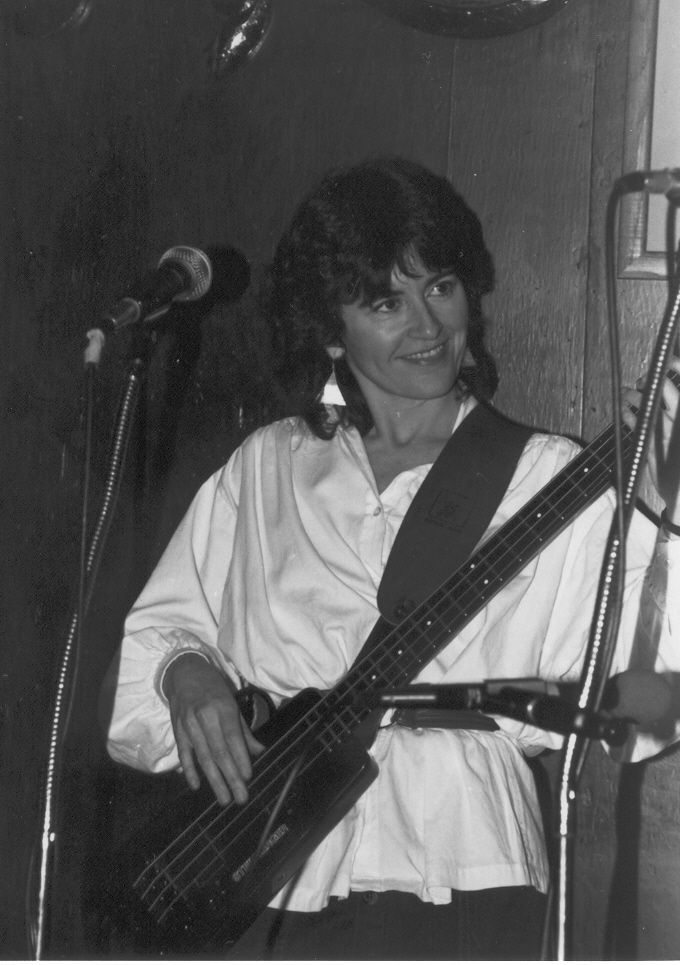
Markie Sanders, bass player

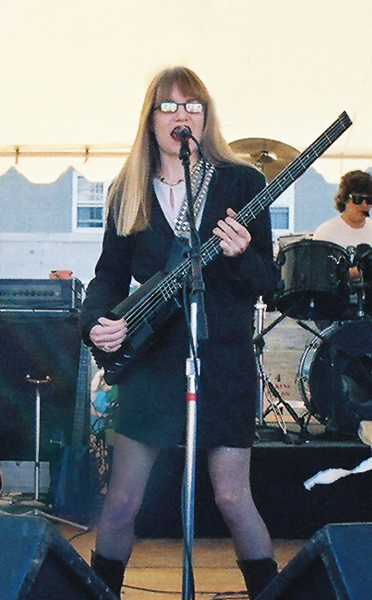
Tina Weymouth, bassist of Talking Heads

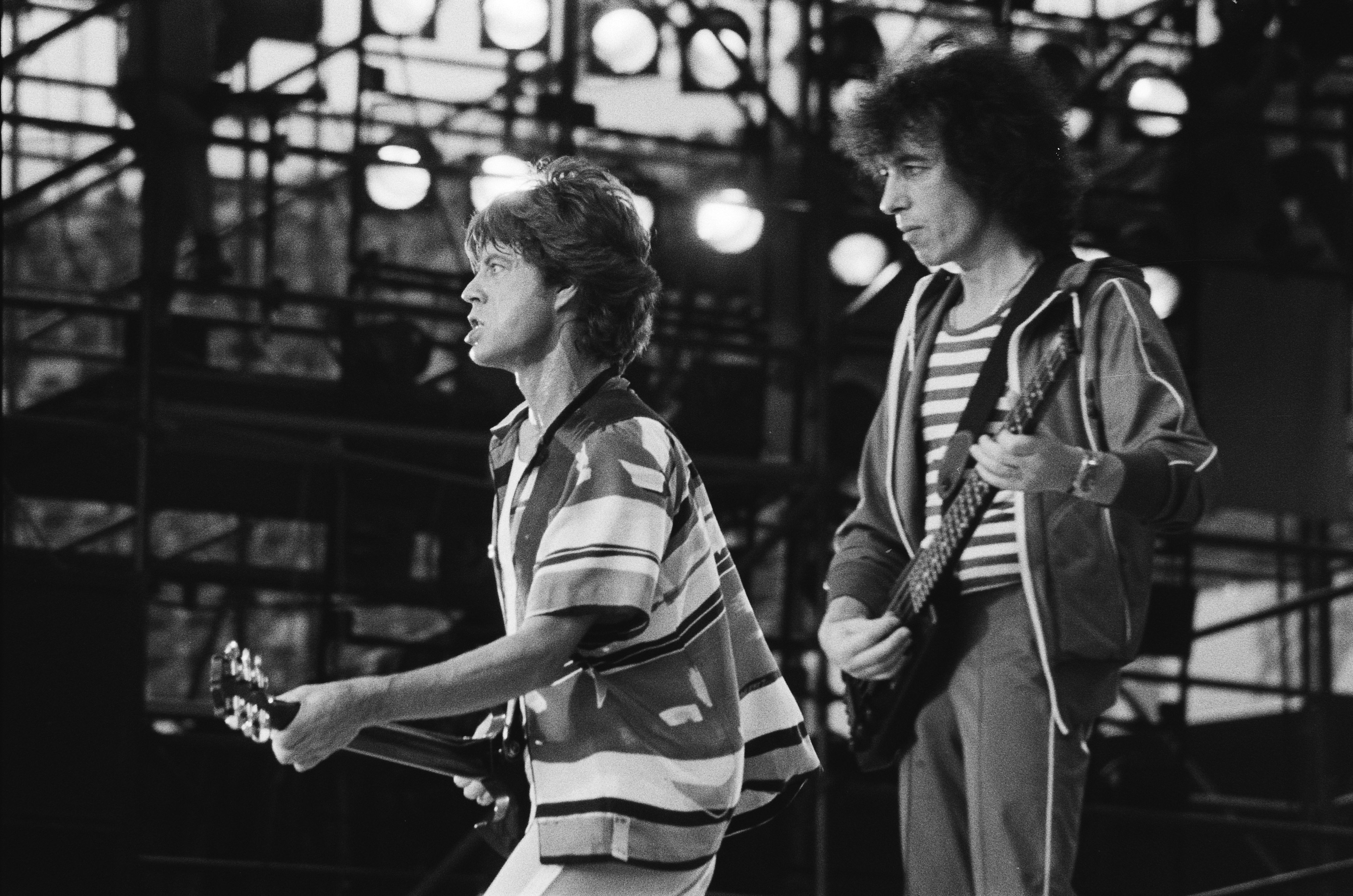
Bill Wyman, bassist of the Rolling Stones
