= Petillo =

Petillo is an Italian surname. Notable people with the surname include:

- Kelly Petillo (1903–1970), American racing driver
- Phil Petillo (1945–2010), American luthier

== See also ==
- Pétillon
