= Vigier =

Vigier is a surname. Notable people with the surname include:

- J. P. Vigier (born 1976), Canadian ice hockey player
- Jean-Pierre Vigier (born 1969), French politician
- Jean-Pierre Vigier (1920–2004), French physicist
- Jean Touzet du Vigier (1888–1980), French army officer
- Philippe Vigier (born 1958), French politician
- Riley Vigier (born 1986), Canadian professional wrestler
- Wilhelm Vigier (1823–1886), Swiss politician

== See also ==
- Vigier Guitars, French guitar manufacturer
- Vigier Surfreter, electric guitar
- Prix Vicomtesse Vigier, French horse race
