= Showmaster =

Showmaster may mean:

- Pseudo-anglicism for a TV show host
- Fender Showmaster, an electric guitar by Fender
- ShowMaster Whiteboard, a kind of upscale glass whiteboard
