= Kramer Guitars =

Electric guitar manufacturer

- Type: Subsidiary
- Industry: Musical instruments
- Founded: 1976; 50 years ago in Neptune Township, New Jersey, U.S.
- Founder: Dennis Berardi, Gary Kramer, Peter LaPlaca, Phil Petillo
- Headquarters: Nashville, Tennessee
- Area served: Worldwide
- Products: Electric guitars and basses
- Parent: Gibson Guitar Corporation
- Website: kramerguitars.com

Kramer Guitars is an American manufacturer of electric guitars and basses. Kramer produced aluminum-necked electric guitars and basses in the 1970s and wooden-necked guitars catering to hard rock and heavy metal musicians in the 1980s. Kramer has been a division of Gibson since 1997.

== Formation ==
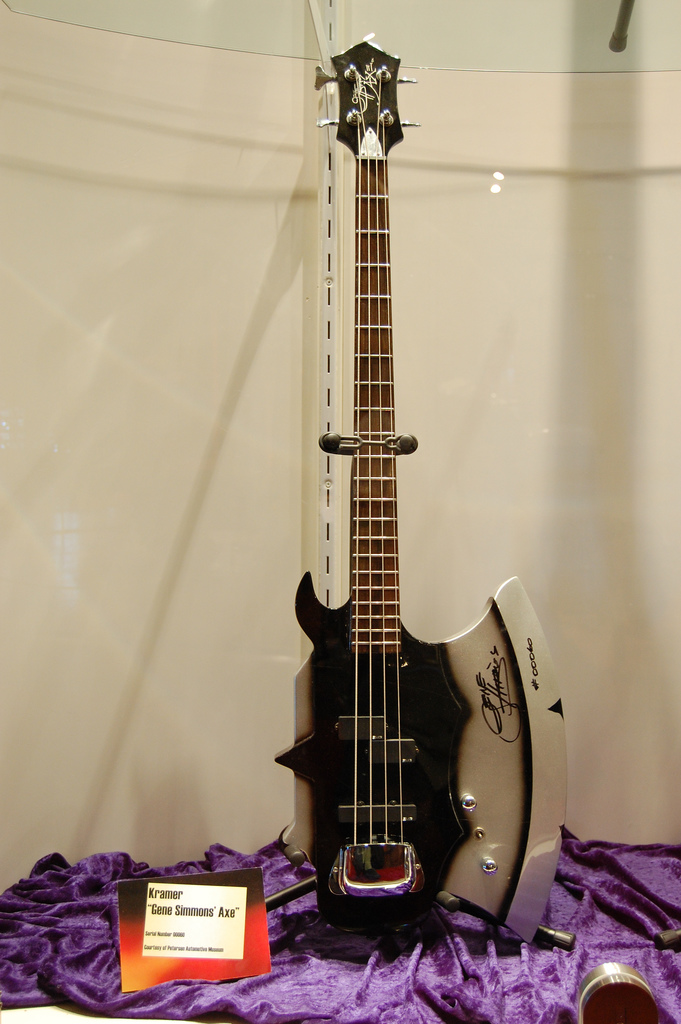
Gene Simmons axe bass guitar

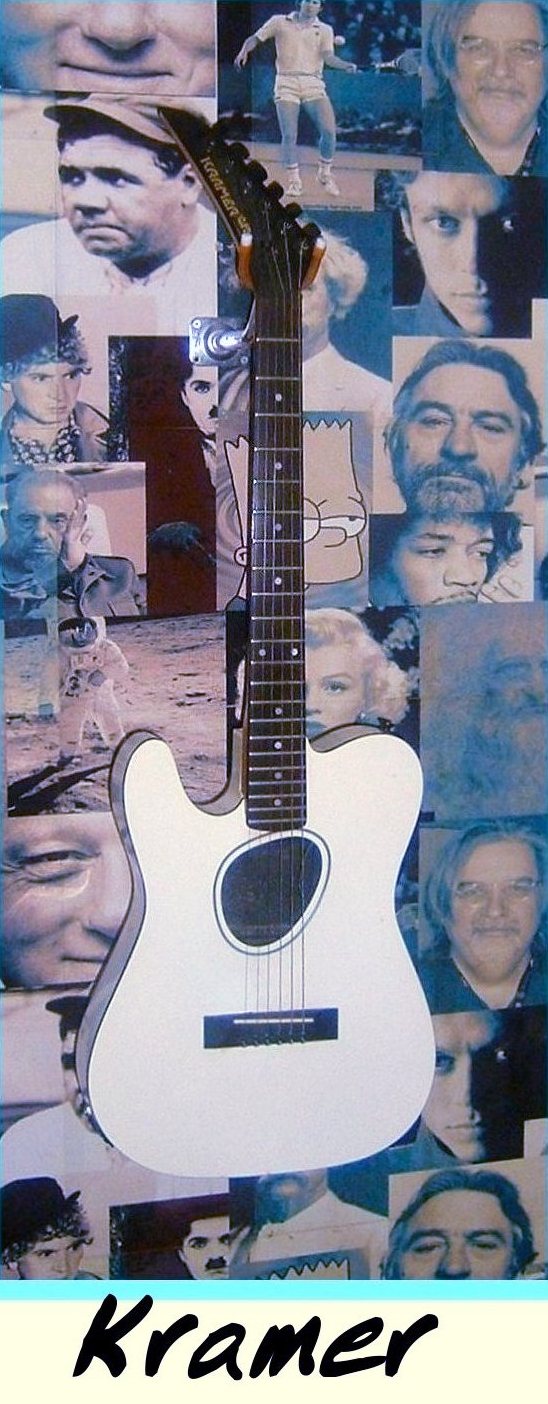
Ferrington acoustic

There is some dispute over the company's early history but it begins with Travis Bean, a California luthier who was building guitars with aluminum necks. Bean and Gary Kramer started the Travis Bean guitar company in 1974, in Sun Valley in Los Angeles. While their guitars did well, Bean lost interest and left most of the business aspects to Kramer and so the two parted ways.

Kramer then founded the company which still bears his name, improving on the Bean design—Bean's necks were heavy and the material felt cold to the touch. Kramer's improvement consisted of two wooden inserts in the back of the neck. By 1975 he had partnered with a friend from New York City, Dennis Berardi, and the two founded BK International, which engaged luthier Phil Petillo to make prototypes for them. Other involved parties were Henry Vaccaro, a real estate businessman who invested money in the venture and Peter LaPlaca, who had experience with Norlin, the company that owned Gibson Guitar Corporation from 1969 to 1986. The rest of the account is murky: Kramer says he was supposed to increase production but was too inexperienced in that area so he wanted to move back to the West Coast. He was to sell back his interests and receive royalties then represent the company out west but none of this seems to have happened.

== 1970s: aluminum necks ==
Introduced in 1976, early models featured the trademark "tuning fork head" aluminum-reinforced necks with a fretboard made of Ebonol—material similar to one used in bowling ball production. Other features of the necks included aluminum dots, and a zero fret. Gary Kramer's inserts, set in epoxy, were usually walnut or maple. The bodies were usually made of high grade Walnut or Maple, with the earliest instruments made of exotic tonewoods including Koa, Afromosia, Swietenia, Shedua, and Bubinga. The hardware was also from a known quality brand: Schaller tuning keys and bridges; Schaller and DiMarzio pickups; custom-made strap pins; aluminum cavity covers. Kramer's "alumi-neck" line lasted roughly until 1982.

Generally, the ratio of basses to guitars produced was about 4:1, primarily because bass players were more willing to experiment. By 1981, Kramer had the tools, and the experience, to take guitar mass production to a new level. Switching to wooden-necked instruments both held the promise of keeping production costs low as well as being able to appeal to traditionally minded guitar players.

== Wooden neck period ==
Kramer first released wooden-necked guitars in late 1981, following Charvel's lead on producing instruments that essentially copied the Stratocaster headstock shape from Fender, in violation of Fender's US trademark and design patent. After only a thousand or so instruments were built, in May 1981, Kramer received a cease and desist order from Fender to halt the production of guitars imitating the Stratocaster head shape. Kramer opted to switch to a "beak" headstock reminiscent of 1960s Kent guitar headstocks.

Wooden-necked instruments represented Kramer's first foray into offshoring the production of guitar components to Eastern Asia. Tuning keys and vintage fulcrum tremolos were made by Gotoh in Japan, while the necks were made by Japan's ESP Guitars and shipped to New Jersey for fretting and finishing. Kramer executives saw that the guitar techniques of the early 1980s demanded a high-performance tremolo system. Kramer partnered with a German inventor named Helmut Rockinger, and installed his bulky tremolos, precursors to Floyd Rose systems, on its instruments.

== Early to mid-1980s ==
A chance encounter between Dennis Berardi and Eddie Van Halen's Artist Development Executive from Warner Bros., Ted Cohen,on an airplane flight set the foundation for Kramer's meteoric rise in the 1980s. Eddie was interested in a tremolo that stayed in tune, which the Rockinger system offered. A meeting between Eddie Van Halen and Kramer execs took place, and Eddie was sold. At the meeting, he reportedly quipped that he would help make Kramer the "#1 guitar company in the world."

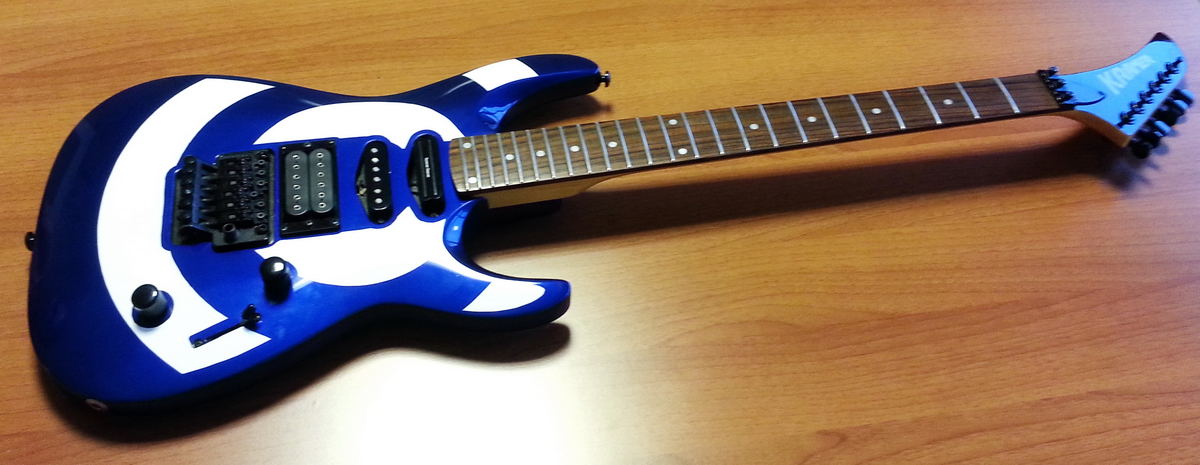
Korean Kramer

By 1983, the Rockinger tremolo (sometimes dubbed "The Eddie Van Halen tremolo") had been widely replaced by the Floyd Rose system. In addition, Kramer once again offered Schaller tuners on their guitars. Floyd Rose had been using Fernandes Guitars of Japan to produce his first non-fine tuner tremolo system and further prototypes.

After initial talks during a meeting at the 1982 NAMM Show, Kramer executives and Floyd Rose struck a deal for Floyd Rose tremolos to be exclusively fitted to Kramer guitars in early 1983, thus giving Kramer a competitive advantage over other guitar manufacturers of the period. As part of the deal, Kramer sidelined Fernandes in favor of Schaller to produce Floyd Rose tremolos for their new guitar lineup. ESP in Japan was increasingly used to build the necks and bodies of Kramer guitars which were supplied to Kramer for U.S assembly. Eventually ESP built whole guitars including the Focus Series which were built to be a cheaper alternative to the U.S line.

In late 1983, Kramer switched from the "beak" headstock design to the Gibson Explorer-like "hockey stick" headstock design. The distinctive look also helped rank Kramer highly with guitar enthusiasts. One notable Kramer guitar was the Baretta model, which was a single-humbucker instrument similar to guitars Eddie Van Halen used on stage. The Kramer Baretta was the flagship of the Kramer line and helped popularize the single-pickup 1980s superstrat guitar design.

Eddie Van Halen's Signature Model

By late 1985, Kramer began installing Seymour Duncan pickups in its guitars, in preference to the more vintage-sounding Schaller pickups. When the sales figures came in, Kramer was the best-selling guitar brand of 1985. In 1986, Kramer switched to the radically drooped "pointy headstock" design. Schaller tuners, Floyd Rose tremolos, Seymour Duncan pickups and exciting graphics by talented factory artists such as Dennis Kline helped propel Kramer to become the best-selling guitar brand of 1986.

== Late 1980s ==
Kramer continued to have success into the late 1980s, promoting hard rock and glam metal artists from Mötley Crüe's Mick Mars to Whitesnake's Vivian Campbell as major endorsees. By 1987, Kramer was using ESP Guitars exclusively for manufacturing its necks and bodies. The "American Series" of instruments were ESP parts, assembled in Neptune, New Jersey. The Aerostar series were made completely in Korea, while the Focus series was made and assembled by ESP. Some early Focus guitars were also made in Japan by the Matsumoku company.

During 1987, Kramer also commissioned guitarist Rich Excellente to create a series of guitars based on the patented features Excellente developed on his "1957 Chevy Tail-Fin" guitar. Kramer, under license from Excellente, manufactured a line of guitars which were marketed as "The Kramer American Showster Series". The guitars were sleeker versions of the more traditional shapes of the day, and utilized Excellente's patented "tear-drop" body taper and "metal loading" insert feature to increase tone and sustain.(U.S.Pat.4,635,522). Fewer than 1,000 of these guitars were produced between 1988 and 1990, and the line was discontinued during 1990 due to manufacturing problems which began to plague Kramer during that time. In addition, Kramer embraced the excess of the late 1980s—producing slick and fluorescent guitars, losing its thought leadership in the guitar manufacturing arena, and damaging the image of the brand. Similarly, the image of the Kramer brand was being tarnished by the release and influx of Kramer Aerostar guitars, lower in quality and made with cheap parts.

By 1989, Dennis Berardi had founded Berardi/Thomas Entertainment, Inc, an artist management company. Seeing promise in a young band out of the Soviet Union, Gorky Park, BTE started managing the group. To help promote the band, the infamous triangle-shape "Gorky Park" guitars were made, reportedly to be given to guitar dealers as promotional pieces. BTE banked on the Gorky Park guitars to help promote the group. When the Russian band achieved only a mild measure of success, and the radical shape of the guitars proved to be unpopular, this was a significant, and final blow to the first incarnation of the Kramer company.

== 1990–present ==
The original Kramer company effectively came to an end in January 1991, mostly due to financial problems. The company had been spending huge amounts on advertising and endorsements, and then lost a lawsuit with Floyd D. Rose over royalties. A notorious firesale of surplus necks, bodies and hardware was held out of New Jersey.

To recover their losses, ESP in Japan assembled their surplus bodies and necks, using their own and locally sourced hardware such as Gotoh tuners, and sold them exclusively in the Japan domestic market as "Kramer by ESP". By 1995, Henry Vaccaro Sr. owned the Kramer brand; in addition, he was the only one of the original partners interested in continuing in the guitar business. He tried one last time to produce Kramer guitars from surplus parts, in the Neptune plant, but only a few hundred were made.

The Kramer brand was sold out of bankruptcy to Gibson Guitar Corporation in 1997. Gibson's Epiphone division has produced guitars and basses under the Kramer brand since the late 1990s, mostly factory-direct through the now-defunct MusicYo.com website. Encouraged by the resurgence of interest in the Kramer brand, Epiphone has been reissuing classic Kramer models, including the "1984 Model", a homage to Eddie Van Halen's famous "5150" guitar used from 1984 to 1991; the "Jersey Star", a homage to the Richie Sambora signature 1980s Kramer; and most recently, the "1985 Baretta Reissue", a standard slant-pickup Baretta. The high-end instruments are assembled in the US from American components. In January 2009, Gibson shut down the MusicYo.com website, instead promising that Kramers would be available through dealers and in music stores by the end of 2009. But supply was not consistent and promised new models were either seriously delayed or never produced.

However, more recently under guidance from a dedicated Kramer team at Gibson, new models have made it to stores, and now includes the budget priced Baretta Special (a model touted on the MusicYo pages but never released until now), plus new designs such as the Pariah & Assault styles. While homages to vintage models like the Stagemaster in the form of the SM-1 and Classic Pacer Imperial, now simply called the Pacer Vintage are also still produced.

In 2007, a Kramer Striker controller was created for Guitar Hero III for the PlayStation 2, under a licensing agreement with Gibson. A Kramer Focus was also available as an in-game guitar, as was one of the earlier aluminum neck model Kramers. The Kramer Fatboy has been featured in Guitar Hero III: Legends of Rock and Guitar Hero: Aerosmith. In 2023, Lzzy Hale (the lead singer for Halestorm) became the first woman to have an artist model Kramer guitar. Hale had previously been named the first female brand ambassador for Gibson, Kramer’s parent company.

Original Kramer guitars today have become highly collectable, after the Kramer name was the butt of jokes for decades and original guitars were considered worth "nothing more than firewood" during the 1990s especially.
