= Red Special =

Electric guitar played by Brian May

Red Special The Fireplace Old Lady
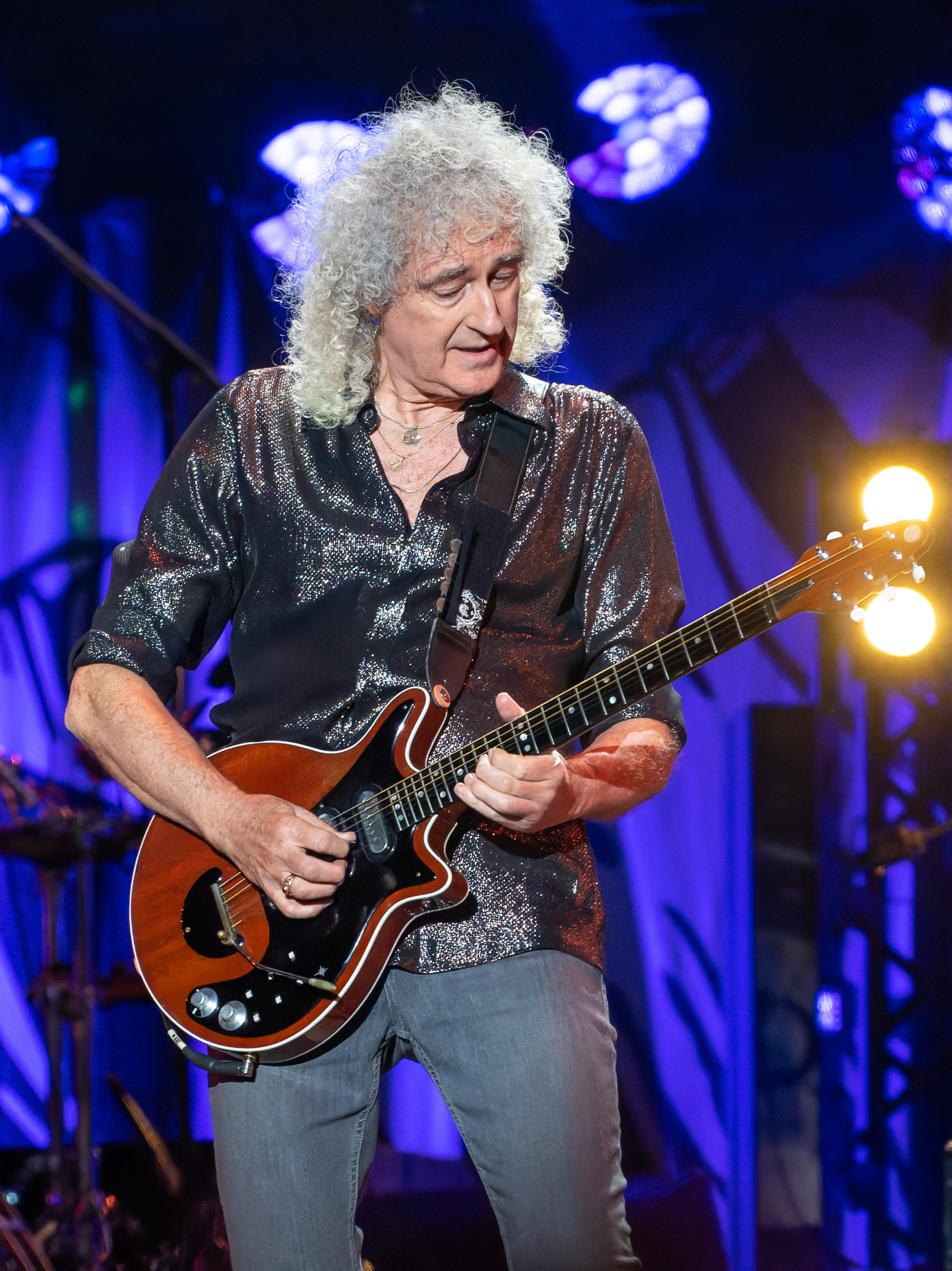
- Brian May on-stage with the Red Special at the first Taylor Hawkins Tribute Concert in London in 2022
- Manufacturer: Brian May, Harold May
- Period: 1963–1965

Construction
- Body type: Semi-hollow
- Neck joint: Straight through/bolt-on
- Scale: 24-inch (610 mm)

Woods
- Body: Oak, blockboard with mahogany marquetry veneer
- Neck: Mahogany
- Fretboard: Oak painted black

Hardware
- Bridge: Custom made aluminium with roller saddles.
- Pickup: 3 × 1967 Burns Tri-Sonics modified (originally homemade pick-ups)

The Red Special is the electric guitar designed and built by Queen's guitarist Brian May and his father, Harold, when Brian was a teenager in the early 1960s. The Red Special is sometimes referred to as the Fireplace or the Old Lady by May and by others. The name Red Special came from the reddish-brown colour the guitar attained after being stained and painted with numerous layers of Rustins Plastic Coating. The name Fireplace is a reference to the fact that the wood used to make the neck came from a fireplace mantel.

A guitar that would define May's signature style, it was intentionally designed to feed back after he saw Jeff Beck playing live and making different sounds just by moving the guitar in front of the amplifier. He wanted an instrument that would be alive and interact with him and the air around him. May has used the Red Special almost exclusively, including on Queen albums and in live performances, throughout the band's entire career.

In celebration of the instrument's 50th anniversary, a book about its construction and history, Brian May’s Red Special: The Story of the Home-Made Guitar that Rocked Queen and the World, was written by Brian May with Simon Bradley.

== Construction ==
Unlike the main instruments of most musicians, the Red Special was built by its player, May, along with his father. The inspiration struck when May realized he could not afford a Fender, Gibson or Höfner guitar. They began to work on the guitar in August 1963, with the project being finished in October 1964. The neck was constructed from wood from a "hundred-year-old-ish" fireplace mantel that a friend of the family was about to throw away. The neck was hand-shaped into the desired form, a job that was made more difficult by the age and quality of the wood. May revealed there are worm holes in the neck of the guitar that he filled in with matchsticks.

The neck was finished with a 24-fret oak fingerboard. Each of the position inlays was hand shaped from a mother-of-pearl button. May decided to position them in a personal way: two dots at the 7th and 19th fret and three at the 12th and 24th.

The body was made from blockboard (strips of softwood sandwiched between two plywood skins) with oak inserts in the top and bottom layers sourced from an old table. It was covered with mahogany marquetry veneer on the top, bottom and side to give it the appearance of a solid-body guitar. It was originally intended that the guitar would have f-holes but this was never done.

White plastic shelf edging was then applied to the top and bottom edges to protect them from damage. The guitar features three single-coil pick-ups and a custom-made aluminium bridge. May purchased a set of Burns Tri-Sonic pick-ups and covered the coils of two with Araldite epoxy to reduce microphonics. The middle pickup remained uncoated and this is understood to have been modified in the early 1980s when DiMarzio examined the Red Special when designing pickups for the first Guild replica. The magnet was turned over to change its polarity and the wires on the solder posts swapped (to mimic a reverse wound coil) which made his favoured pickup combination of bridge and middle in phase humbucking. He originally wound his own pick-ups, as he had for his first guitar, but he did not like the resulting sound because of the polarity of these pick-ups: alternating North-South instead of all North.

Tremolo system of the Red Special

The tremolo system is made from an old hardened-steel knife-edge shaped into a V and two motorbike valve springs to counter the 79 pounds-force (350 N) of string tension. The tension of the springs can be adjusted by screwing the bolts, which run through the middle of the springs, in or out via two small access holes next to the rear strap button. To reduce friction, the bridge was completed with rollers to allow the strings to return perfectly in tune after using the tremolo arm (the arm itself was from a bicycle saddlebag holder with a plastic knitting needle tip). For the same reason, at the other end of the neck the strings pass over a zero fret and through a bakelite string guide.

Originally the guitar had a built-in distortion circuit, adapted from a mid-1960s Vox distortion effects unit. The switch for this was in front of the phase switches. May soon discovered that he preferred the sound of a Vox AC30 distorting at full power, so the circuit was removed. The switch hole is now covered by a mother-of-pearl star inlay, but was originally covered by a red dot in the 1970s, and some insulation tape in the 1980s.

== Appearances ==
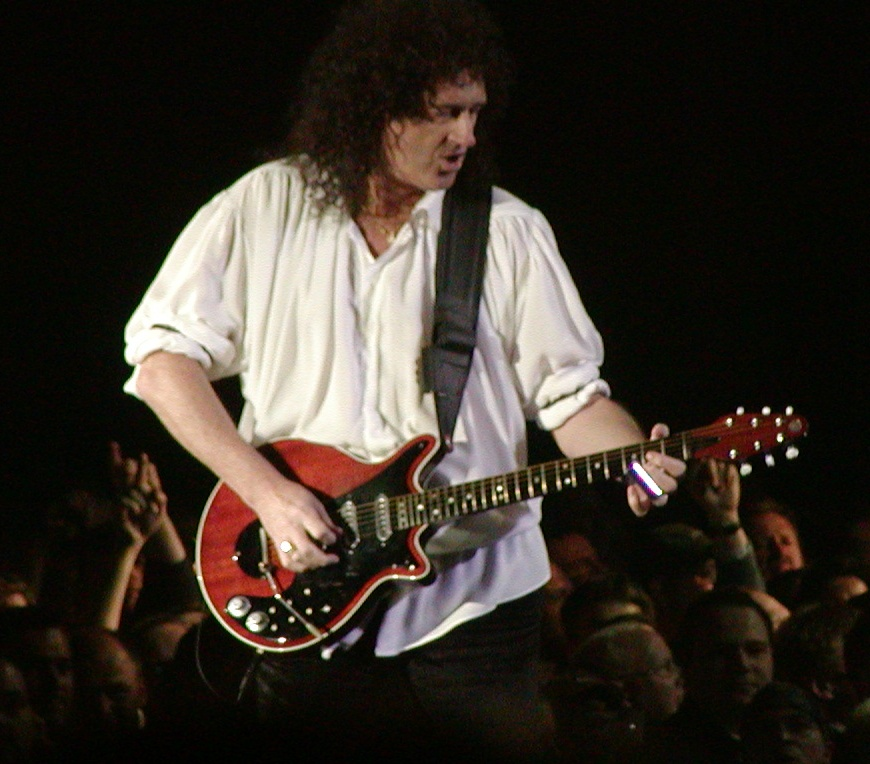
Brian May playing the Red Special in Frankfurt on 19 April 2005, during the Queen + Paul Rodgers Tour

May still uses the original but he has used replicas in some performances. Notably, the original guitar was not used in the videos "We Will Rock You", and "Spread Your Wings", instead using his John-Birch-made Red Special copy (see Replicas section below) which differs from the original in its all-maple construction and natural maple color, since he did not want to expose the Red Special to snow. The Birch was also used live as a back-up for the Red Special until it was destroyed by May in a fit of rage due to the tuning stability issues. Similarly, he opted not to use the Red Special for the "Play the Game" video, instead using a budget Satellite-badged replica of a Fender Stratocaster, since at one point in the video, Queen singer Freddie Mercury would snatch the guitar from May and "throw" it back to him. The Red Special was omitted from the video for "Princes of the Universe", in which May used a white Washburn RR11V (This guitar is often mistaken for a Jackson Rhoads). He recorded the original of "Crazy Little Thing Called Love" on Queen drummer Roger Taylor's Fender Esquire, but performed the accompanying video and live performances of the song until 1992 with a Fender Telecaster.

== Replicas ==
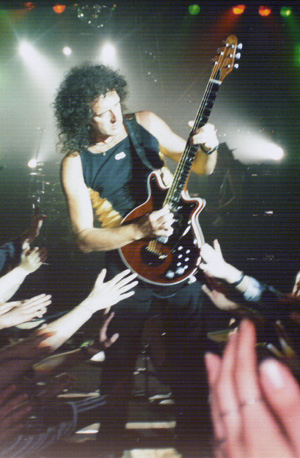
Brian May performing with the Greg Fryer Red Special "John" Replica (note the Fryer logo on the headstock) in Warsaw, 1998.

=== Official replicas ===
The first official copy of the Red Special was made by British luthier John Birch and was used as a back-up for live performances until it was accidentally destroyed by May during a concert in August 1982. The Birch was used in place of the Red Special in the music videos for "We Will Rock You" (however, it was not used to record the song), and "Spread Your Wings". The guitar differs from the original in its all-maple construction and natural finish except for the back which is gold finished. After its destruction May sent the guitar to American luthier John Page, who kept the remains for over 20 years before sending them back to May. May then had the guitar glued back together by Andrew Guyton and still owns it; however, it hardly functions anymore.

Other official replicas of the Red Special have been manufactured in varying numbers and in multiple models (i.e. a higher-end full-featured model, and a lower-cost one lacking some of the intricacies of the former) several times during the 1980s and 1990s, most often by the Guild Guitar Company from 1983 to 1985 and again from 1993 to 1995, and by Burns Guitars from 2001 (mass-produced models made in Korea). The Burns model, produced with guidance from May, was awarded "Best Electric Guitar of the Year 2001" by Guitarist Magazine. Currently, only Brian May Guitars (taking over manufacture from Burns) manufacture authorised replicas, the Special at a budget price point and the Super Mk 2 at a higher price point aimed at enthusiasts.

KZ Guitar Works manufactured the original Red Special Super model which was hand-made in Japan by master luthier Kazutaka Ijuin. This model has been discontinued and production of the revised Super model taken up in the Czech Republic for Brian May Guitars.

The Brian May Guitars version differs from the Burns original in several ways; for example, the tremolo was a two-point synchronised tremolo with rear access plate. These models also feature a half-moon scratch plate behind the bridge to emulate the original. The switches were also changed from black to white to match May's guitar. They still use the Burns Tri-Sonic pick-ups. 24 guitars were made in a rare baby blue color with a pearloid pickguard and gold hardware. The guitars come in Antique Cherry (a similar color to that of the Red Special), White and 3-Tone Sunburst with chrome hardware. They also have Honey Sunburst, Black and Gold with gold hardware and other various finishes.

Greg Fryer, of Fryer Guitars an Australian luthier, produced three replicas of the Red Special in 1996–97, and with permission from May, made exhaustive measurements of the original guitar. Fryer named his three replicas John, Paul and George Burns (after two members of The Beatles and the famous American comedian). May has two of these guitars, John and George Burns; Fryer kept Paul for some years and used it for testing modified Vox AC30 amplifiers and his range of treble boosters until he sold it to a Japanese collector for an undisclosed sum. While the woods used in John and Paul are more faithful to the original, George Burns was built with New Guinea rosewood for a "more aggressive edge" tonally. John is May's main back-up Red Special, and is tuned to standard. His green Guyton has replaced George Burns for Drop D tuning duties to play "Fat Bottomed Girls" live.

In 2004, Andrew Guyton of Guyton Guitars, a luthier in the UK, manufactured 50 authorised, limited edition replicas of the Red Special: 40 in red to celebrate the 40th anniversary of the guitar, and ten in green, as he had previously seen a green Guild copy that he liked.

=== Unofficial replicas ===
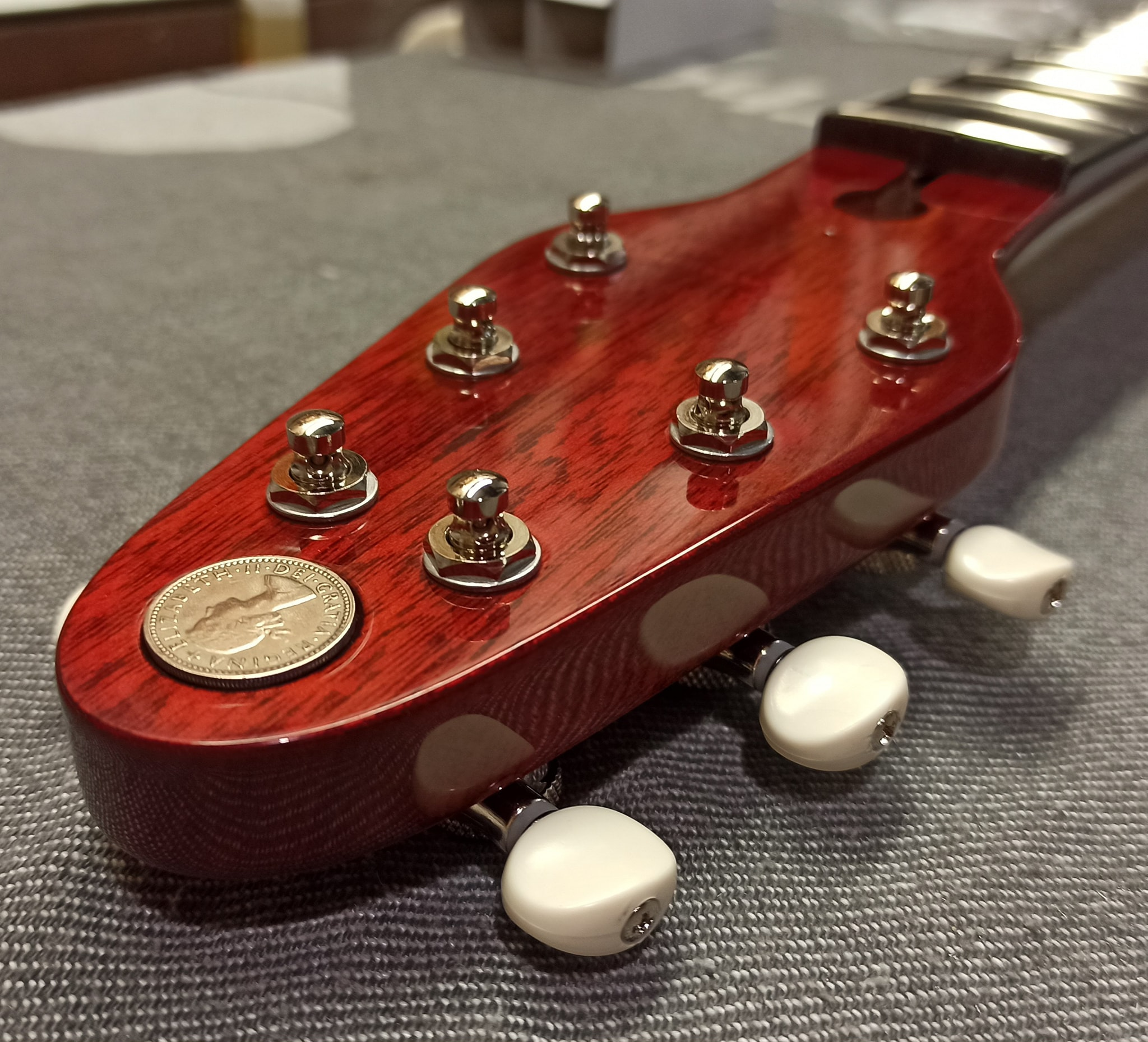
A Scheithauer Mayday in construction in May 2021.

In the 1970s, Japanese guitar manufacturer Greco was the first company to market a line of mass produced Red Special copies, albeit unofficial and unlicensed. They did, however, send one to May himself, which he used in various mimed performances the most well known being the Top of the Pops performance for "Good Old Fashioned Lover Boy". CQuadro Guitar Works (now Carpinteri Guitars) in Italy makes Red Special replicas (the Bohemian and the Extreme). Dansan Guitars makes Red Special replicas hand built in France. Dillion Guitars (prior to 2014 were built in Korea) making "Tribute Guitars" in two models. Dillion Guitars are manufactured in Vietnam by Inyen Vina of Ho Chi Minh City. RS Custom Guitars run by Everett Wood makes a variety of Red Special style replicas hand-built in Nashville, Tennessee. RS Guitars, which were hand-built in Arizona by Steve Turpin, discontinued production of their models in January 2011. In Germany Scheithauer Guitars makes a Red Special style replica called "Mayday" in Mühlhausen. Harley Benton Guitars make replicas of the Red Special, however, their model has a single five-way switch in place of the three individual pickup switches, as well as having a 25-inch (640 mm) scale rather than 24 inches (610 mm).

== Variations ==
In 2006, Brian May Guitars introduced a "Mini May" guitar, based on a three-quarter-sized Red Special body shape with a 24-fret, 19-inch (480 mm) scale (but with no zero fret) featuring a single pick-up, no switches and a maple neck. In 2017, the "Mini May" was upsized with a 22 3/4-inch (580 mm) scale neck.

An acoustic guitar, featuring a 24-fret neck and the body outline of the Red Special went into production in 2007. This model is named the "Rhapsody", after the Queen song "Bohemian Rhapsody".

A bass guitar called the Bri-Bass was announced on May's website and is available. It looks like his normal guitar but with four bass strings. It features a bound mahogany body and 31 1/2-inch (800 mm) scale neck, topped with a 20-fret ebony fingerboard. Pickups are a Gibson EB-0 type chrome-covered humbucking neck pick-up and a rear-position single coil pick-up hooked up to a passive volume/volume/tone circuit.

The Guild models of the early 1990s featured three major configurations. Of the three, the "Signature" model was closest to May's guitar, although it was made of mahogany (body and neck) and ebony (fingerboard) and sported Trisonic-styled "Brian May" pick-ups made by Seymour Duncan and hardware (including the unique bridge) from Schaller. The "Special" model featured a stop-tailpiece rather than a vibrato, the middle pick-up was moved back next to the bridge pick-up for a humbucking look, and the back of the guitar had no binding. The "Standard" model featured a more common Stratocaster-style 5-way pick-up selector switch, a longer scale neck, and a deeper headstock angle. Andrew Guyton made May a double-neck version, which has never been a production model.

== Restoration ==
After viewing the replicas and taking note of the wear and tear the Red Special had suffered during nearly 30 years of constant touring, May had Fryer restore the original Red Special in 1998 using as much original and time-period specific material as possible. Damaged veneer on the back of the guitar was removed and new pieces scarfed in. The binding was removed and various nicks and dents in the top were repaired. Fryer re-finished the neck and body in the original Rustin's Plastic Coating used in the creation over the existing finish, and fretboard wear was repaired and dot-markers replaced. The original electrics were also re-wired and overhauled, and cosmetic work was done, such as filling in holes and worn areas on access panels, pick-up covers (worn by May's use of a sixpence as opposed to a standard plectrum) and the front scratchplate.

The restored Red Special is prominently featured during a series of video interviews with Guitarist in 1999, in which May also demonstrated its feedback capabilities.

At the end of the Queen + Paul Rodgers tour in 2005, May had several revisions made to the original Red Special, including having the zero fret replaced for the first time (this had been judged unnecessary at the time of the 1998 restoration) and making a larger opening for a new, modern 1/4-inch jack socket. Despite all of this work, the original frets (other than the zero fret) have never been replaced.

Andrew Guyton of Guyton Guitars, carried out a limited restoration in April 2016. This work involved making good all the cracks in the Rustins Plastic Coating lacquer finish, repairing damage to the end and edge, and touching in of the fretboard and replacing one of the mother-of-pearl marker dots. Various parts, including the tremolo and bridge assembly were removed, serviced, cleaned and lubricated then refitted. The zero fret was also replaced again.

== Specifications ==
=== Body ===
- Oak from an old table and blockboard (with a mahogany veneer), semi-solid body
- Depth: 1 9/16 inches (40 mm)

=== Neck ===
- Bolt on, one large bolt which sits beneath the fingerboard and goes through a hole in the body then a nut is then attached; it is also screwed down by two wood screws at the tenon end which ends just before the bridge pick-up. The Greg Fryer, Burns/Brian May Guitars, Guild, John Birch and Greco replicas feature a set (glued) neck.
- Mahogany from a Victorian fireplace surround mantel that was going to be thrown out.
- Neck pitch: 2°
- Headstock angle: 4°
- Width at nut: 1 7/8 inches (47 mm)
- Width at 12th fret: 2 inches (51 mm)
- Depth at 1st fret: 1 inch (25 mm)
- Depth at 12th fret: 1 1/16 inches (27 mm)
- Though using a 24-fret fingerboard, the scale length of the Red Special is a short 24 inches (61 cm); compared to the Gibson standard of 24 3/4 inches (63 cm) and Fender's common 25 1/2-inch (650 mm) scale lengths, this creates a looser feel for the strings, which is conducive to May's extensive use of string bending and his wide vibrato.

=== Fretboard ===
- Black-painted oak
- Radius: 7 1/4 inches (180 mm)
- Scale length: 24 inches (610 mm)
- Number of frets: 24
- Fret gauge: 3/32 by 3/64 inch (2.4 mm × 1.2 mm)
- Inlays: 3rd, 5th, 9th, 15th, 17th, 21st frets (one dot), 7th and 19th frets (two dots), 12th and 24th frets (three dots)

=== Nut ===
- Zero fret with Bakelite string guide

=== Strings ===
- String spacing at nut: 1 13/16 inches (46 mm)
- String spacing at bridge: 2 inches (51 mm)
- Strings: Optima Gold Brian May Custom Gauge (.009, .011, .016, .024, .032, .042)

=== Other ===
- Pickups: three modified Burns Tri-Sonic
- Tremolo arm: self-made from bicycle saddlebag parts
- Pickguard/pickup surrounds/tailpiece: black Perspex
- Controls: master volume, master tone, on/off (slide) switch for each pick-up, in/out of phase switch for each pick-up
- Plectrums: copper-nickel sixpence
- Weight: approximately 8 pounds (3.6 kg)

== See also ==
- Deacy Amp
- List of guitars
