= Floyd Rose =

Guitar vibrato system

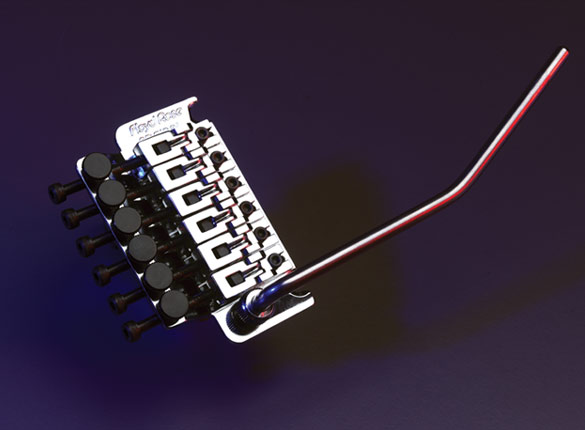
Floyd Rose Original

The Floyd Rose Locking Tremolo, or simply Floyd Rose, is a type of locking vibrato arm for a guitar. Floyd D. Rose invented the locking vibrato in 1976, the first of its kind, and it is now manufactured by a company of the same name. The Floyd Rose gained popularity in the 1980s through guitarists like Eddie Van Halen, Neal Schon, Brad Gillis, Joe Satriani, Steve Vai, Mick Mars, and Alex Lifeson, who used its ability to stay in tune even with extreme changes in pitch. Its tuning stability comes through the double-locking design that has been widely regarded as revolutionary; the design has been listed on Guitar World's "10 Most Earth Shaking Guitar Innovations" and Guitar Player's "101 Greatest Moments in Guitar History 1979–1983."

== History ==
Floyd D. Rose first started working on what became the Floyd Rose Tremolo in 1976. He was playing in a rock band at the time, inspired by Jimi Hendrix and Deep Purple. He frequently used the vibrato bar but could not make his guitars stay in tune using traditional approaches like lubricating the nut, or winding the strings as little as possible around the tuning pegs.

At the time, Rose made and sold jewelry, and so had the skills and tools to fabricate small metal parts. After noticing the strings moved freely with the regular nut design, he made a brass nut that locked the strings in place with three U-shaped clamps. He installed this nut in his 1957 Fender Stratocaster. Later he improved this design by using hardened steel—otherwise the strings wore the clamps down too quickly—and redesigned the bridge, which also locked the strings with clamps.

Rose hand-made the first bridges and nuts, which were quickly picked up by some influential guitarists at the time, such as Eddie Van Halen. Other well-known guitarists who picked it up early were Neal Schon, who purportedly got serial number 3, Brad Gillis (serial number 4), and Steve Vai.

The first patent was awarded in 1979, with Fernandes Electric Sound Research Group Co. Ltd. contracted as the initial supplier from 1981, producing early models (FRT-1 and FRT-3) via Japanese manufacturers for supply to Kramer Guitars in the U.S. and Fernandes/Burny guitars domestically. Following suggestions from Eddie Van Halen, the bridges were modified by extending and bending the rear of the base plate, firstly vertically (prototype FRT-4) and then at an angle (final version FRT-5) to form a "whale tail" with a row of vertical finger screws for each string to allow for fine-tuning the guitar after the strings are locked at the nut.

Production shifted to Schaller GMB in Germany by the end of 1983, marking the transition to European manufacturing for subsequent Original Floyd Rose units. Kramer's guitar models with the Floyd Rose bridge became very popular, leading them to drop the earlier Rockinger vibrato in favor of the Floyd Rose between June 1982 and January 1983. The Floyd Rose design's popularity led to other companies making similar bridges, thus violating the patent. To combat this Floyd Rose and Kramer went on to make licensing agreements with other manufacturers, and there are now several different models available based on the double-locking design. The licensed units made by other manufacturers were stamped "Licensed Under Floyd Rose Patents" or similar. By the mid-1980s OEM units were supplied directly, made exclusively by Schaller, before being replaced by the Floyd Rose "1000 Series", made in Korea in the early 2000s.

Original supplier Fernandes Guitars went on to produce their "Headcrasher" and subsequent "FRT"-series versions for their own brand of guitars until 1997. Takeuchi produced licensed tremolos for Japanese-built Ibanez, Jackson, Charvel, Yamaha, Fernandes, Aria Guitars, and Washburn guitars, among others, until the mid-2000s. They also made lower-cost units for Ibanez's entry-level guitars up to 2010. Gotoh made their own licensed tremolo as a direct replacement for an Original Floyd Rose and also supplied theirs as an OEM unit to Aria Guitars, B.C. Rich, Peavey, and Fernandes. In collaboration with Ibanez, Gotoh also developed and produced the "Edge" series for Ibanez guitars. ESP made their "ESP Synclear Tremolo" for their Japanese-made guitars during the 1980s. Yamaha made their "Rocking Magic" series of tremolos until the mid-2000s. Kahler produced the renowned "Steeler," "Killer," and "Spyder" variants during the 1980s while developing their own cam-based Kahler Tremolo System for which they are best known for today. Notably, courts found that the Kahler Tremolo System infringed on Floyd Rose's patents, and awarded a judgment in excess of $100 million against Gary Kahler.

In January 1991, Kramer's exclusive distribution agreement with Rose ended when Fender announced they would be the new exclusive distributor of Floyd Rose products. While Fender used Floyd Rose-licensed vibrato systems previously, this move allowed Fender to offer a few models with the original Floyd Rose Tremolo, such as the Richie Sambora Signature Strat in 1991, the Floyd Rose Classic Stratocaster in 1992 and the Set-Neck Floyd Rose Strat in 1993. Floyd Rose collaborated with Fender to design a Fender Deluxe Locking Tremolo, introduced in 1991 on the Strat Plus Deluxe, the USA Contemporary Stratocaster, and the Strat Ultra. Fender used the Floyd Rose-designed locking vibrato system on certain humbucker-equipped American Deluxe and Showmaster models until 2007.

In 2005, distribution of the Floyd Rose Original reverted to Floyd Rose, whereas the patented designs were licensed to other manufacturers to use.

== Principles ==
The basic principles of the action of a double-locking floating bridge are shown. Its proportions are exaggerated to demonstrate the effect.

Position I illustrates the normal position of an ideally tuned Floyd Rose bridge. The bridge (orange in the diagram) balances on a pivot point, being pulled counter-clockwise by the strings' tension and clockwise by typically one to five springs. Controlled by special tuning screws (purple in the diagram), these two forces are balanced such that the bridge's surface is parallel to the guitar body (olive in the diagram). The strings are locked tightly with a special mechanism at the nut (green in the diagram) as well as at the bridge (turquoise in the diagram), hence "double-locking".

Position II illustrates the position of the bridge when the vibrato arm is pushed down towards the guitar body. The bridge rotates around a pivot point counter-clockwise and the tension in each string decreases, lowering the pitch of each string. The sound of any notes being played becomes flat. While the tension of the strings decreases, the tension of the springs increases. It is the balance between string tension and spring tension, as well as the fact that the strings' points of contact are, typically, locked, at the bridge saddles and nut (eliminating "play" in the string, which would negatively affect tuning), that brings the strings reliably back into tune when force on the bar is removed.

Position III illustrates the position of the bridge when the vibrato arm is pulled up away from the guitar body. The bridge rotates clockwise, the tension in the strings increases, the pitch of the sound increases and so notes sound sharper than normal. Due to the limitations on the assembly's movement imposed by the guitar's body, the amount of available pitch change is much larger when the bar is depressed than when it is lifted.

Note that when using the vibrato bar, string action (the distance between the strings and the fretboard) is affected, and this can sometimes cause the strings to unintentionally touch the frets and create unwanted sounds on instruments set up with extremely low action and heavily recessed vibrato installations.

== Advantages and disadvantages ==
The main advantage of the Floyd Rose vibrato system is its double-locking design. This makes the guitar stay in tune through large pitch changes, e.g., forcing the vibrato bar all the way down to the guitar body, or pulling up on the bar to raise the tone by as much as a fifth or a seventh.

A typical bridge set-up has it "float"—so the player can both raise and lower the pitch with the vibrato bar. However, if a string breaks, the balance of tensions on the bridge is disrupted, leaving the bridge out of position and therefore the guitar out of tune. Moreover, since the tension of one string affects the tension of all the others, it can take several iterations through the tuning process before the instrument is tuned.

Some players, including Eddie Van Halen, prefer to instead have a "half-floating", or, "flush-mounted", bridge, which allows only downwards motion. This means the cavity of the tremolo pocket is not fully milled away underneath—and if the tension of the rear springs is slightly stronger than the tension of the strings, the tremolo always rests flush with the body. In this set-up, a broken string has no effect on the pitch of the other strings, as the reduced overall string tension from the broken string doesn't make the bridge move, since it already presses against the body of the guitar. This also allows fitting a device to the bridge that can drop the low E-string down to D to extend the tonal variety of the guitar, even during live performance. Bending, however, still affects the rest of the strings, which makes some double-stop ('diad'), techniques more difficult to achieve.

The bridge's effect on the tone of the guitar is a topic of much disagreement. Some players find that the Floyd Rose bridge has a "thin" tone, which has led to the development of replacement sustain blocks. These blocks are generally larger in size than the standard block and may be constructed from a similar brass alloy or an alternative like titanium or copper. According to reviews this modification might lead to a preferable change in the tonal quality of the guitar.

== Genuine models and varieties ==
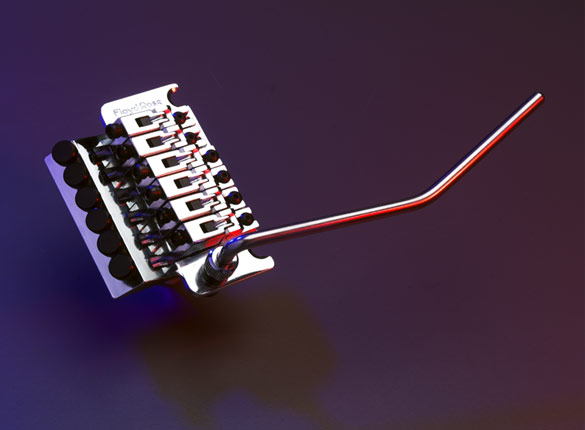
Floyd Rose Pro

Floyd Rose SpeedLoader

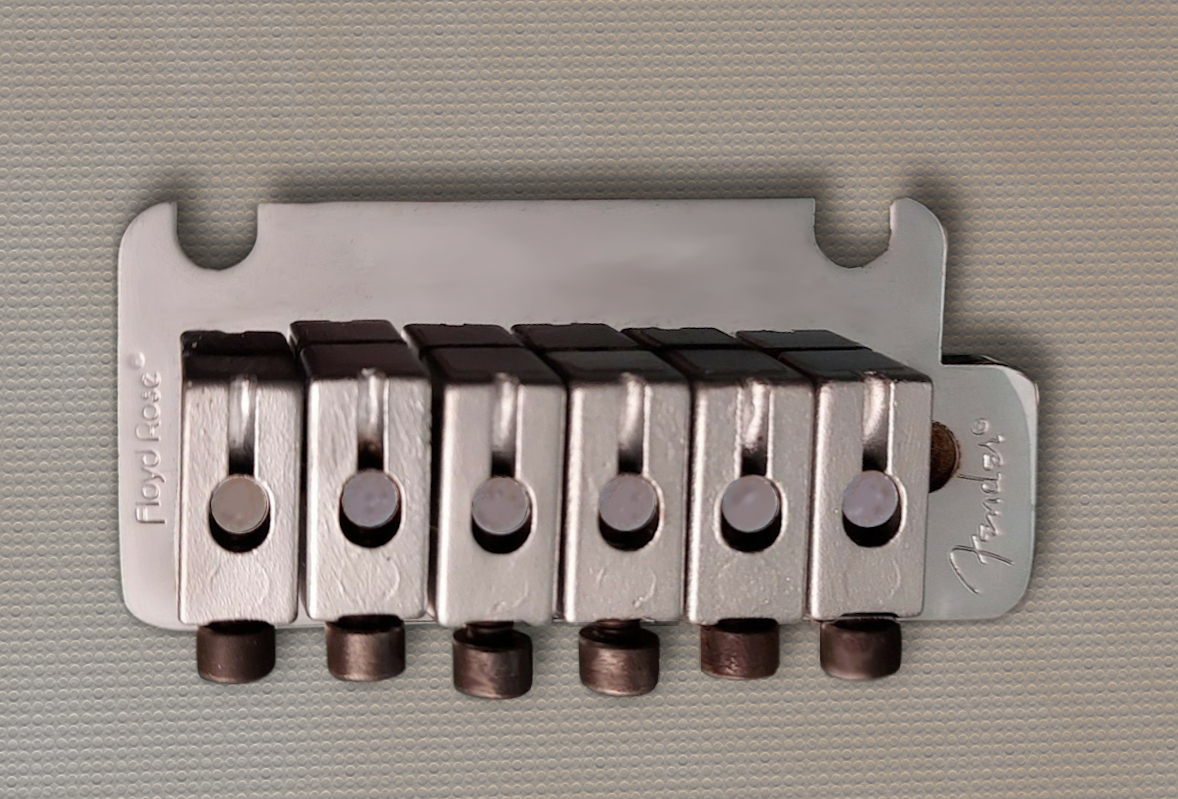
Fender Deluxe Locking Tremolo

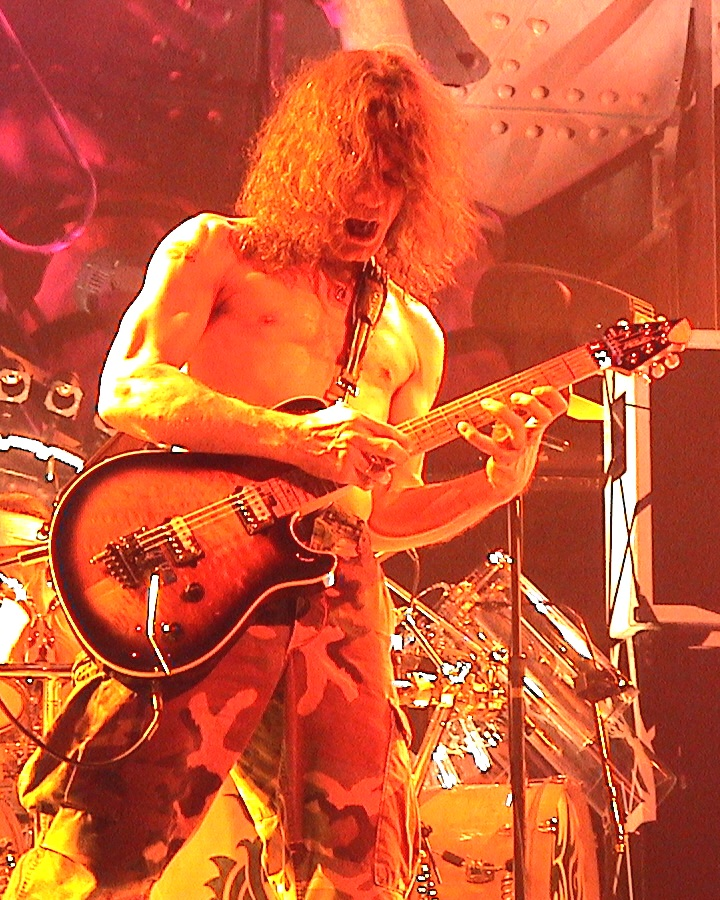
Eddie Van Halen with guitar fitted with Floyd Rose EVH 1000 Series tremolo

- Floyd Rose Original is the double-locking tremolo system with fine tuners. It became the flagship model which has been in constant production since 1983 and is referred to as the 100-Series. It has remained largely consistent with the original design, featuring only minor updates such as improved alloys and manufacturing tolerances. The name "Floyd Rose Original" distinguishes this system from licensed versions produced under patent. Early production Floyd Rose Originals were double-locking at the bridge and nut but initially lacked fine tuners on some units, requiring players to unclamp the nut for retuning. The non-fine tuner version was reintroduced in 2015 after some modern players, including Guthrie Govan and Brad Gillis, advocated the model as a matter of preference. Originally manufactured by Schaller in Germany from 1983 to 2024, the Floyd Rose Original is now produced by Floyd Rose in the United States.
- Floyd Rose II was a lower end version of the Original Floyd, also made by Schaller, used mostly on import Kramer guitars and as an OEM unit on mid-range instruments by multiple brands throughout the 1980s and 1990s. Originally, Floyd IIs were single locking, with strings not needing to have the ball ends cut off and locking only at the nut. Later versions were made double locking and all Floyd Rose II versions used die cast zinc baseplates (a cheaper and weaker material than the Original Floyd Rose's steel baseplate) paired with replaceable steel knife edge modules. Schaller produced its own licensed version under the name "Schaller Licensed Floyd Rose", which is still produced today under the simpler moniker "Schaller Tremolo"(see below in Licensed models section).
- Floyd Rose Pro is a low-profile version of Floyd Rose Original. The bridge and arm design is changed in such a way that the guitarist's hand is generally closer to the strings while holding the vibrato arm. The bridge has a narrower string spacing (0.400 inches or 10.16 mm in this design versus 0.420 inches or 10.66 mm of the Floyd Rose Original) and is made in Korea.
- Floyd Rose SpeedLoader was a redesign developed in 1991–1999, first introduced on select B.C. Rich guitars in 2002, and released as a standalone bridge in January 2003. It combined Floyd Rose Original with the SpeedLoader system, and required special double bullet-ended strings that snapped into the bridge without the need to wind or tune them. It was manufactured under license of McCabe US Patents for "macrotuners", i.e. full-range tuners. The proprietary strings were manufactured by Dean Markley, but the bridge was discontinued by the late 2000s, having been available for less than a decade.
- Floyd Rose 1000 and Floyd Rose Special are made with the same design as the Original but manufactured in South Korea. In the early days of mass manufacturing in China, factories sourced musical instrument hardware from established Korean OEM suppliers via a shared manufacturing pool that continues to this day. As China built its own domestic production capabilities in the late 2000s, including its own OEM pool, a flood of inexpensive counterfeit and low-quality copies emerged following the expiration of key Floyd Rose patents in 2003. To compete directly with these knockoffs, Floyd Rose introduced the affordable "Floyd Rose Special" around 2008. The Floyd Rose 1000 is built with the same materials as the Original (premium steel components), however, the Floyd Rose Special utilizes substitute materials, such as zinc alloy saddles, zinc alloy string insert blocks, and zinc alloy fine-tuner screws instead of steel, and a zinc alloy sustain block instead of brass, which significantly decreases the cost of the Special model while delivering reliable performance expected from an authentic Floyd Rose product.
- Fender Deluxe Locking Tremolo. A specially designed system that was made by Fender Musical Instruments Corporation in 1991 in conjunction with Floyd Rose, utilizing locking tuners, a modified Fender 2-point synchronized vibrato with locking bridge saddles and a special low-friction LSR Roller Nut that lets strings slide during vibrato use. This is a double locking system, except the other locking point is at the tuner instead of nut.

=== Well-known Floyd Rose Licensed Models ===
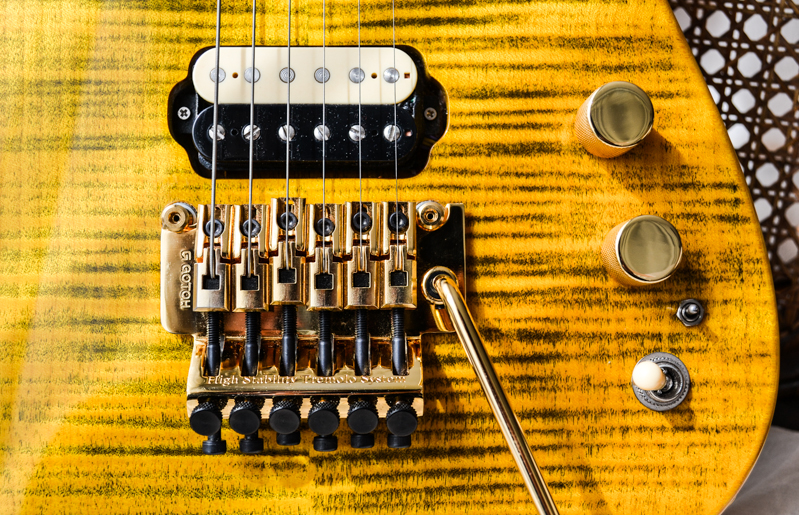
Gotoh GE1996T

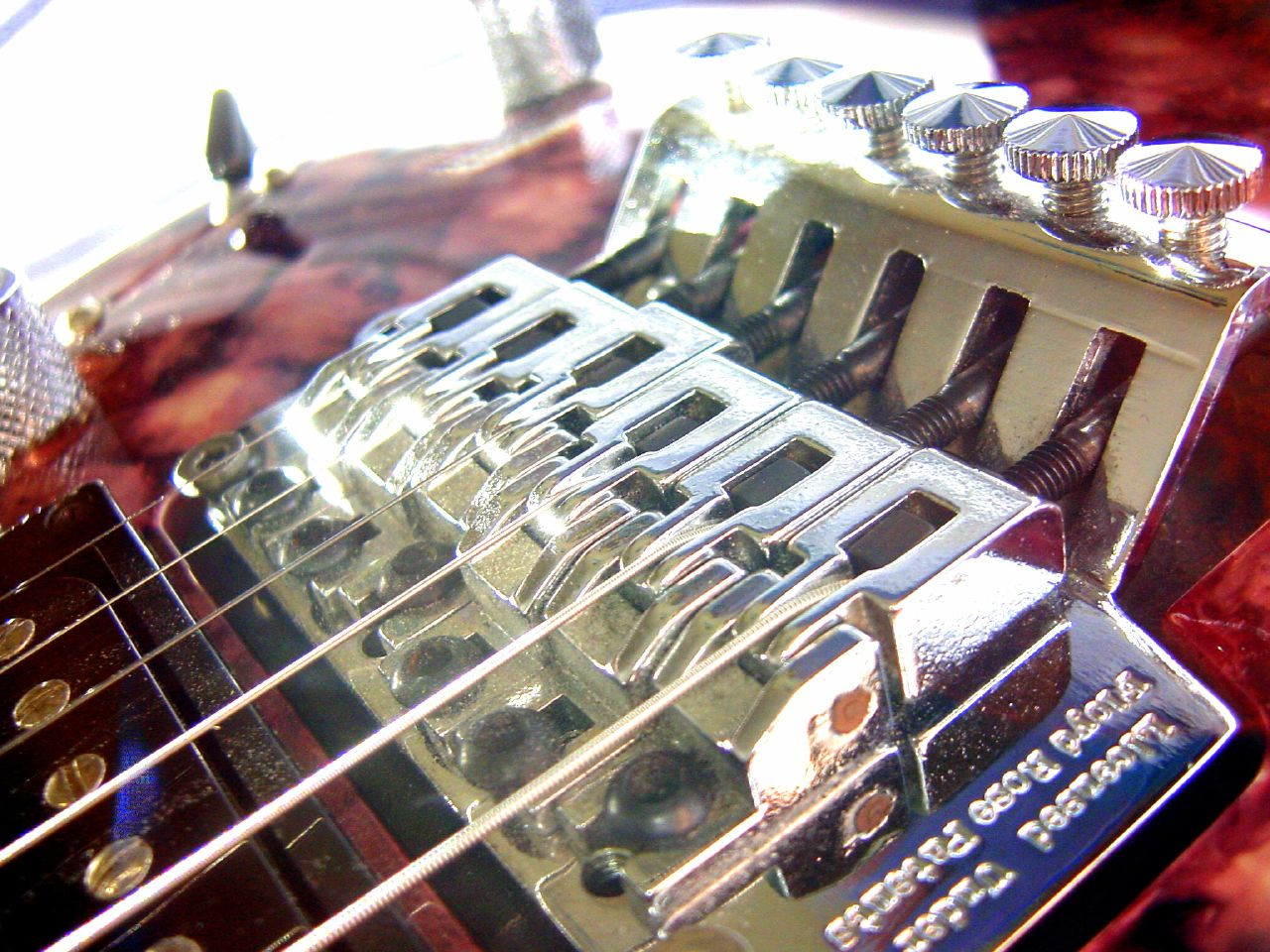
KKT-3 licensed Floyd Rose tremolo manufactured by Jin Ah in Korea

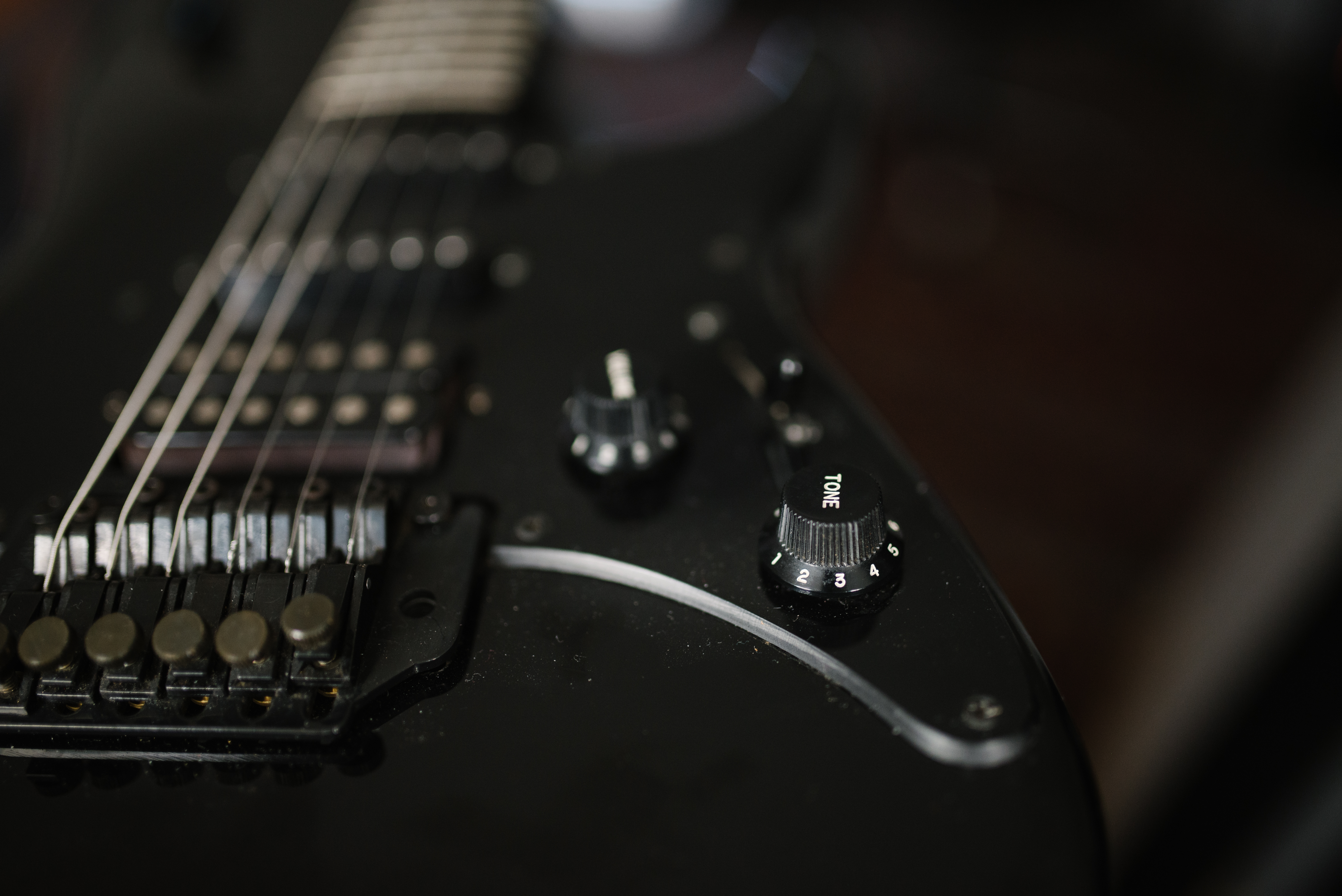
Fernandes FRT-8 'Body Crasher' tremolo, also used on Aria Pro II and Yamaha guitars (1980s)

Ibanez Edge Tremolo, introduced 1986.

Previously, all similar double locking vibrato systems were produced under license from Floyd Rose, and marketed as such, but in 2002 the relevant patents expired.

- Gotoh GE1996T is an alternative made by Japanese guitar hardware company Gotoh. It was a refinement of Gotoh's earlier licensed double-locking GE1988T released in 1988. The GE1996T shares the same materials as the Floyd Rose Original and adds new advancements to the design, including an Allen key adjustable push in arm and stud locks, which lock the studs to the body. It is a straight swap for an Original Floyd Rose or Schaller Licensed Tremolo. The product name comes from the year it was introduced, 1996.
- Schaller Licensed Tremolo, the original makers of the Floyd Rose Original between 1983 and 2024, also makes their own bridges which share the design of the Floyd Rose, but with minor differences and their own branding. The Schaller Licensed Tremolo is simply a Schaller stamped version of the Floyd Rose II and uses the same zinc die-cast baseplate & hard steel swappable knife edge modules. It was momentarily phased out after 2012 for the Schaller proprietary Schaller LockMeister (see below), but has been back in production since then. A non locking version for Fender Stratocaster format existed as well but was discontinued, without the fine tuners but with roller saddles. An example of famous Charvel & Jackson OEM versions of Schaller's Licensed Tremolo, made by the latter, are the JT-570 & JT-590
- Schaller Low Profile Tremolo had a completely revised baseplate based on the low profile "Floyd Rose Pro" concept, but used the same die cast zinc alloy material for the base plate as the Schaller Licensed Floyd Rose / Floyd Rose II, and had the same replaceable steel knife edge inserts.
- Schaller Lockmeister is a proprietary double-locking tremolo made in Germany which is a direct drop-in for Original Floyd Rose. It replaced Schaller's own Schaller Licensed Tremolo around 2012. It is manufactured with CNC-machined C45-steel components, black-zinc corrosion-resistant hardware, shim-free height-adjusted saddles, and steel (not zinc) baseplate for improved sustain/durability. Features radius options (14 combinations for straight/compound boards) and longer fine-tuner screws; available in 6/7-string, multiple finishes, and block depths (32/37/42 mm); primarily aftermarket. Previously, a non locking version for Stratocaster style guitars existed, called the "Schaller Vintage Tremolo", with similar roller saddles as the non locking version of the Licensed Floyd Rose (see above), but with a steel baseplate similar to that of the later LockMeister instead of the cast zinc of the cheaper Licensed/Floyd Rose II.
- Takeuchi TRS-101: A Japanese-made licensed double-locking tremolo system based on the Floyd Rose Original design, manufactured by Takeuchi from the 1980s to the late 2000s. Characterized by its trapezoid base plate, screw-in arm, and hardened construction, it was supplied as OEM for brands such as Ibanez, Jackson (JT580), Washburn (600-S), and Yamaha. It was also sold as an aftermarket kit. Widely replicated, it is considered the most copied Floyd Rose-style system outside official production.
- Gotoh Lever Lock and Yamaha Finger Clamp: Japanese proprietary double-locking tremolo systems developed as tool-free, string-through alternatives to the Floyd Rose, allowing strings to be inserted without cutting ball ends and locked via levers after initial tuning. The Gotoh Lever Lock, introduced around 1986–1987 and manufactured by Gotoh, featured saddle levers for locking, fine tuners on the tail, a standard Floyd Rose-compatible locking nut, and a base plate stamped "Licensed Under Floyd Rose Patents" (often upside down), with Gotoh markings on the sustain block. It appeared on models such as B.C. Rich NJ Series Warlock and ST-III guitars (1986–1989 and 2000s Japanese production), Lag Rockline (1987 French-made), and the limited-edition Gibson WRC (1987–1988 collaboration with Wayne Charvel). The Yamaha Finger Clamp, launched in 2007 as a proprietary refinement, retained the core lever-lock saddle mechanism but added cosmetic updates, rear horizontal hex screws for intonation, and a unique lever-based locking nut that could be pulled out and rotated out of the way for easier access—no tools required for string changes, with no inscriptions on the unit. It equipped Yamaha models like the CV820 WB Wes Borland Signature and RGX-520DZ (Taiwan-made, 2007 into the 2010s). Both systems were discontinued (Gotoh version after short production; Yamaha by around 2010.)
- Vigier Floyd Rose : Vigier Guitars produced the "Tune Lock Vibrato" in the late '80s, a hefty unlicensed unit mounted on ball bearings, often found on Vigier Passion guitars. It was discontinued save for replacement parts. In the beginning of the '90s, Vigier had Schaller produce in Germany a customized version of the latter's die-cast licensed model (see above): this revised system instead uses force-tolerant needle bearings for improved wear on the bridge and enhanced tuning stability. The same molds as the Schaller Licensed Floyd Rose were used, the bearing modules are mounted in specific cutouts near where the knife edges were located, the right module interfering with the stamped relief "made in Germany by S[challe]r". Non-Locking versions were made as well, the earliest having a die cast base and still produced today, under the name "Non Locking Vibrato Vigier 2011" while the updated "+" version of the latter replaces all die cast elements with machined & plated brass. The ball-bearing and global tuner features are manufactured under license to American Inventor and recording artist, Geoffrey Lee McCabe—see U.S. Patent Nos. 6,175,066 5,965,831, 6,891,094, 5,986,191, 6,563,034 and 7,470,841.
- Kahler 2700 Series (Killer, Steeler, and Spyder) made in the late 80s by Kahler, designed by David Petschulat, this system used a knife-edge fulcrum bridge (unlike the typical Kahler cam system). The Steeler was Kahler's licensed Original Floyd Rose whereas the Spyder and Killer used both Floyd Rose and proprietary Kahler technologies. The string locks at the bridge were embossed FLOYD ROSE LIC.
- Ibanez Edge is a licensed Floyd Rose variant manufactured by Gotoh and adopted by Ibanez in 1986. There are 4 primary versions: Edge, LoPro Edge, EdgePro, and EdgeZero with numbered variants denoting budget models of the main lines, and also "Double" variants of many of these, the moniker denoting the inclusion of Piezo pickups. The Edge and LoPro Edge were discontinued in 2003 but were subsequently reintroduced on the signature models of Steve Vai and Joe Satriani. (Some special edition guitars used these trems prior to their reintroduction; however, the vibratos used were new old stock (NOS), rather than production runs.) These two vibratos, whether old or new, bear a mark of Floyd Rose Licensing, as they are produced using the same tooling, by Japanese guitar parts manufacturer Gotoh. All ibanez Edge models have a zinc alloy die cast base and tone block, with replaceable hard steel knife edge inserts (similarly to Schaller's Licensed Floyd Rose & Low Profile models), while the Edge Pro models have additional "sound chip" elements in the saddles supposed to enhance sustain and sound transfer according to Ibanez.
- Ibanez Zero Resistance aka ZR Tremolo uses a ball-bearing pivot system instead of knife-edge as the joint, and a felt dampened stop-bar to help the guitar stay in tune after diving the vibrato. Ibanez claims this system improves tuning stability after breaking a string. These springs, including their orientation, are referred to as the ZPS system, with variants numbered 1 to 3, and are also present as part of the EdgeZero design. The Zero Resistance tremolos feature a single intonation adjustment screw mounted on the baseplate itself when not in use and meant to adjust all tuner saddles, the intonation could thus be performed on-the-go without the need of a device such as the "Floyd Rose The Key Intonation Tool" as the latter requires partial disassembly of the saddles. Variations include: a non locking, tuner-less Fender Stratocaster format "SynchroniZR" (2008), a 7 string "ZR-7"(2007), but also a ZR tremolo with a detuning device similar to the "EVH D-Tuner", and in 2015 a "ZR2" model with an updated arm system, but ultimately all ZR models were discontinued gradually between 2015 and 2018 due to licensing legal disputes centered around the implementation of ball bearings. The ball-bearing and global tuner features were manufactured under license to American Inventor and recording artist, Geoffrey Lee McCabe—see U.S. Patent Nos. 6,175,066 5,965,831, 6,891,094, 5,986,191, 6,563,034 and 7,470,841.
- PT 505, by OEM producer Ping Well Industrial Co. Ltd of Taiwan. This licensed Floyd Rose unit is most similar to the Gotoh GE1996T and was produced as an OEM product for Peavey Guitars and Fernandes Guitars as well as available as an aftermarket kit. Ping Well was also the manufacturer of the original Floyd Rose Speedloader system and the original Graph Tech GHOST LB-63 tremolo bridge with integrated piezo saddles, the base of which is a slightly modified PT 505.
- Body Crasher FRT-8 was a proprietary tremolo system introduced by Fernandes in 1986 after the end of their licensing agreement with Floyd Rose. It featured a simplified design distinct from the traditional Floyd Rose, consisting of a string-through bridge with fine tuners mounted vertically on six individual pivoting arms, each corresponding to a string. Strings passed horizontally through these arms and were held in place by string tension, with the tremolo arm screwed directly into the bridge block. Early models were marked with "Body Crasher." Later versions were marked "FRT8-PRO." Unlike Floyd Rose designs, the Body Crasher did not use locking mechanisms and had a more rudimentary construction. It was used on Fernandes guitars from 1986 through the mid-1990s and also adopted by other brands such as Aria Pro II and Yamaha.
- Bendmaster FT is a proprietary Floyd Rose-style locking tremolo designed by St. Louis Music (SLM) for Westone guitars introduced in 1984. It was a rudimentary system featuring unique "J-shaped" saddles and fine tuners. In 1987 SLM shifted its production to Korea and the Bendmaster was thereafter manufactured by Jin Ah Industrial Co. in Korea under license for SLM, which owned the design. Further to its use on Westone guitars, it became an OEM product adopted by guitar brands with Korean production lines including Aria Pro II, B.C. Rich, Charvette by Charvelle, Epiphone, and Memphis. During the 1990s, the Bendmaster was a popular entry- to mid-range alternative to the original Floyd Rose tremolo, balancing cost and performance and expanding access to locking tremolo technology beyond high-end instruments.
- KKT-3 is a licensed Floyd Rose double-locking tremolo bridge that was manufactured in Korea by Jin Ah Industrial Co. during the late 1980s and 1990s. Produced under official Floyd Rose patents, it served as an OEM component for guitars manufactured in Korea by Samick, Cort, and World Musical Instrument Co. It has a die-cast trapezoid-shaped baseplate with one straight knife-edge, conical fine tuners, and the distinctive licensing statement in "Courier New" typeface on the base plate. Aside from the one straight knife edge and unique saddle height adjustability, the KKT-3 is essentially a Takeuchi TRS-101 copy. It was distributed worldwide as a complete aftermarket replacement kit, notably through WD Music in the United States.

== Popular use ==
The Floyd Rose Tremolo rose to popularity in the early 1980s. Many popular artists quickly adopted the device, making it difficult to measure how much each individual artist contributed to that popularity. Most sources consider Eddie Van Halen a pioneer of Floyd Rose usage. Other players frequently cited as influential Floyd Rose users are Steve Vai, Joe Satriani, Kirk Hammett, Brad Gillis, Tom Morello, Allan Holdsworth, Dimebag Darrell and Synyster Gates. Brad Whitford of Aerosmith and Alexander Julien of Vision Eternel were noted users of the Floyd Rose SpeedLoader bridge.

== Patents ==
Floyd Rose holds a number of patents on floating bridge design:

- US patent 4171661, Floyd D. Rose, "Guitar tremolo method and apparatus", issued 1979-10-23 — bridge mechanism patent;
- US patent 4497236, Floyd D. Rose, "Apparatus for restraining and fine tuning the strings of a musical instrument, particularly guitars", issued 1985-02-05 — first fine tuners and saddle patent;
- US patent 4549461, Floyd D. Rose, "Apparatus for restraining and fine tuning the strings of a musical instrument, particularly guitars", issued 1985-10-29 — second fine tuners and saddle patent;
- US patent 4555970, Floyd D. Rose, "Tremolo apparatus capable of increasing tension on the strings of a musical instrument", issued 1985-12-03 — spring and claw mechanism;
- US patent 4882967, Floyd D. Rose, "Tremolo apparatus having broken string compensation feature", issued 1989-11-28 — early patent for a tremstopper device;
- US patent 4967631, Floyd D. Rose, "Tremolo and tuning apparatus", issued 1990-11-06 — patent for Floyd Rose Pro, low-profile version;
