= Floyd D. Rose =

American musician and engineer (born 1948)

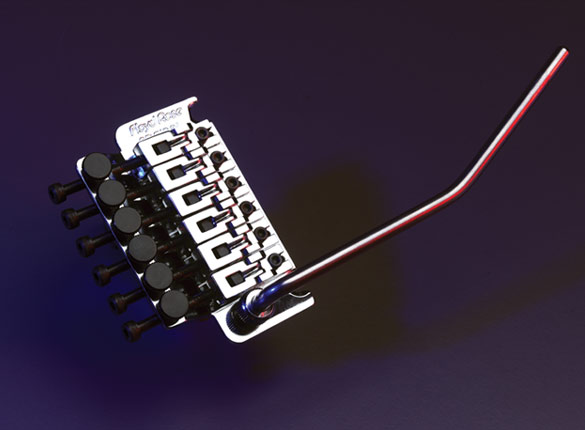
Floyd Rose Original Locking Tremolo designed by Floyd D. Rose

Floyd D. Rose (born 1948) is an American musician and engineer who invented the Floyd Rose Locking Tremolo System in the late 1970s, eventually founding a company of the same name to manufacture and license his products. This double locking system was notable for its ability to stay in tune despite repeated use and wide variations in pitch. His design was later recognized on Guitar World's "10 Most Earth Shaking Guitar Innovations."

== Development of the locking system ==
Rose was a guitarist in a rock band in the 1970s. Like many other guitarists of the time period, he frequently experienced issues with his guitars going out of tune after using the tremolo arm. In 1976, after trying several traditional techniques for keeping the guitar in tune, he began developing a locking system to keep the strings from moving freely through the nut. Several improvements soon followed, including using more durable materials to lock the strings down on the nut, and the creation of a similar system of clamps to lock the strings down on the bridge. His double locking system was originally hand-made, but high demand eventually led to Rose commissioning Fernandes Electric Sound Research Group Co. Ltd. of Japan to mass-produce the early designs, and later Schaller of Germany. Following a deal with Kramer Guitars, coincident with the release of the final double-locking design with fine tuners at the beginning of 1983, Rose's tremolo systems were exclusivity featured on Kramer guitars until the company's bankruptcy at the end of the 1980s.

== Musical career ==
In the early 1980s, Rose was playing guitar in a Seattle area hard rock band named C.O.R.E. Eventually, he and vocalist Scott Palmerton (also known as Jonathan K.) left the band in order to form Q5. They were joined by guitarist Rick Pierce, bassist Evan Sheeley and drummer Gary Thompson from another local band named TKO. In 1983, the band gained the attention of the rock band Heart's management team and recorded a seven-song demo. Later that same year, the band recorded their debut album, Steel the Light, which was re-released the following year on the Music for Nations label. The band's follow-up album, When the Mirror Cracks, took a more commercial approach, but failed to achieve the level of success of their previous release. The band disbanded shortly after.
