= Q5 (band) =

American rock band

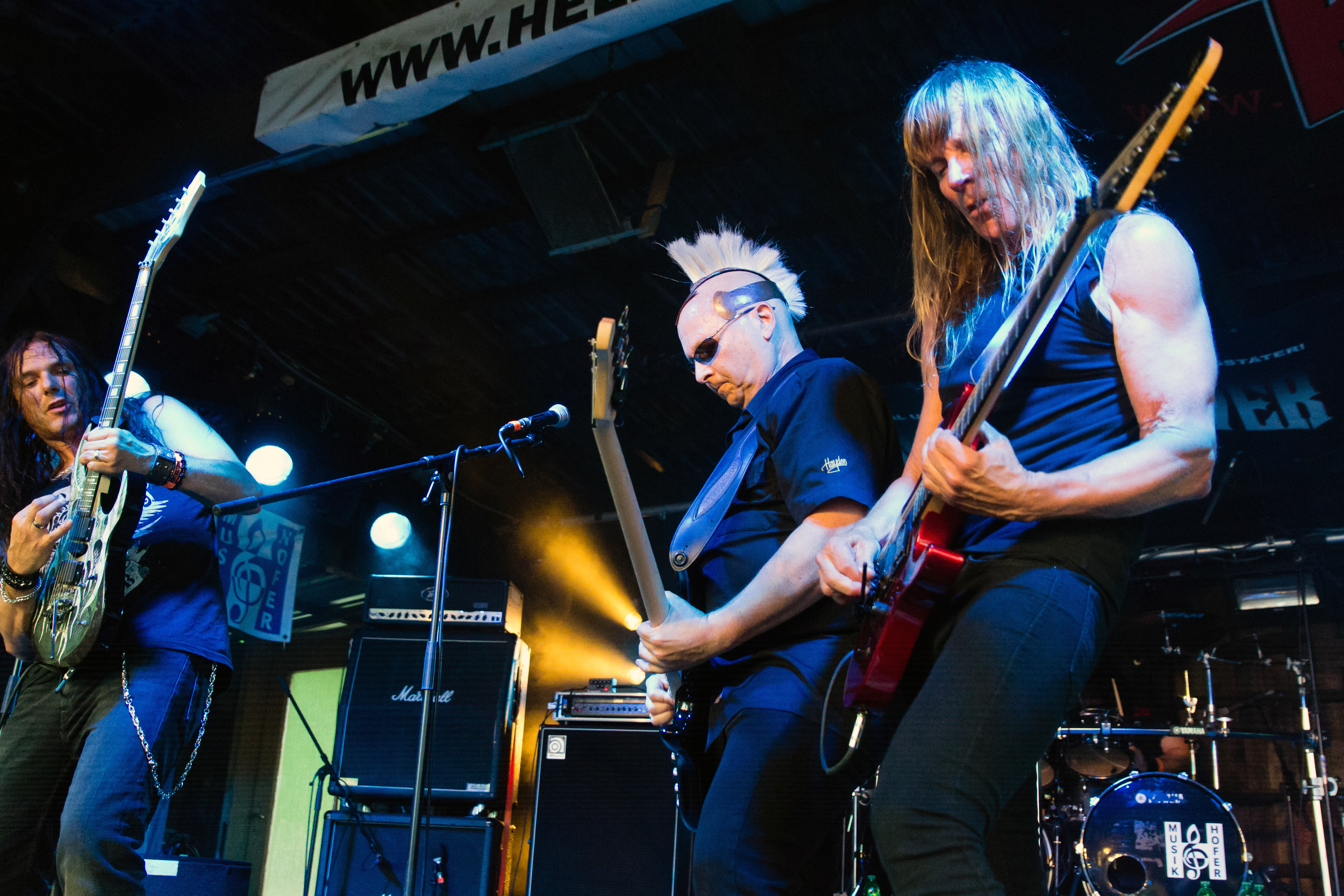
- Q5 at Headbangers Open Air 2016

Background information
- Origin: Seattle, Washington, US
- Genres: Hard rock; heavy metal
- Years active: 1983–1989, 2014–present
- Labels: Frontiers; Music for Nations; PolyGram
- Website: Q5 on Facebook

Q5 is an American hard rock/heavy metal band from Seattle, Washington, which was formed in 1983. Their first studio album, titled Steel the Light, came out in 1984. Picking up critical praise, the outfit toured with the likes of Lita Ford and Twisted Sister. However, the group faced internal musical divisions that ultimately ended the project before the 1980s came to a close. They quickly reformed as Nightshade and played throughout the 1990's and early 2000's as Nightshade/Q5 In 2014, Q5 re-formed to perform at the Sweden Rock Festival, and found that the one-off event was not enough, deciding to continue on with the revamped version of the group.

== Biography ==
Q5 started in 1983. It functioned as a supergroup by mixing together members of two popular Seattle bands of the time. Frontman Jonathan K and guitarist Floyd D. Rose from "C.O.R.E." (or "The C.O.R.E.") picked guitarist Rick Pierce, bassist Evan Sheeley, and drummer Gary Thompson from Seattle band "TKO". Their first studio album, 1984's Steel the Light, earned praise from many critics. Released on Music For Nations in Europe and RCA Records in Canada and Japan it enjoyed decent world wide sales Q5 signed on with Polygram for their 1986 sophomore release, When the Mirror Cracks, but the writing was already on the wall. Personal musical differences broke the group apart not long after said release.

They later regrouped as Nightshade and released another album called released on Music For Nations and later Hellion Records, Dead of Night in 1991. Many of the songs for this album had been written in the Q5 days.

The band recorded two more albums as Nighshade, Men of Iron, Hellion Records, in 2001, and Stand And Be True in 2008. While touring the band continued to play both Nightshade and Q5 songs.

The band has featured a melodic hard rock sound incorporating heavy metal influences, with its songs being covered by the likes of Great White and Wolf. Ex-member Floyd Rose is also better known as the inventor of the guitar locking tremolo system.

== Members ==
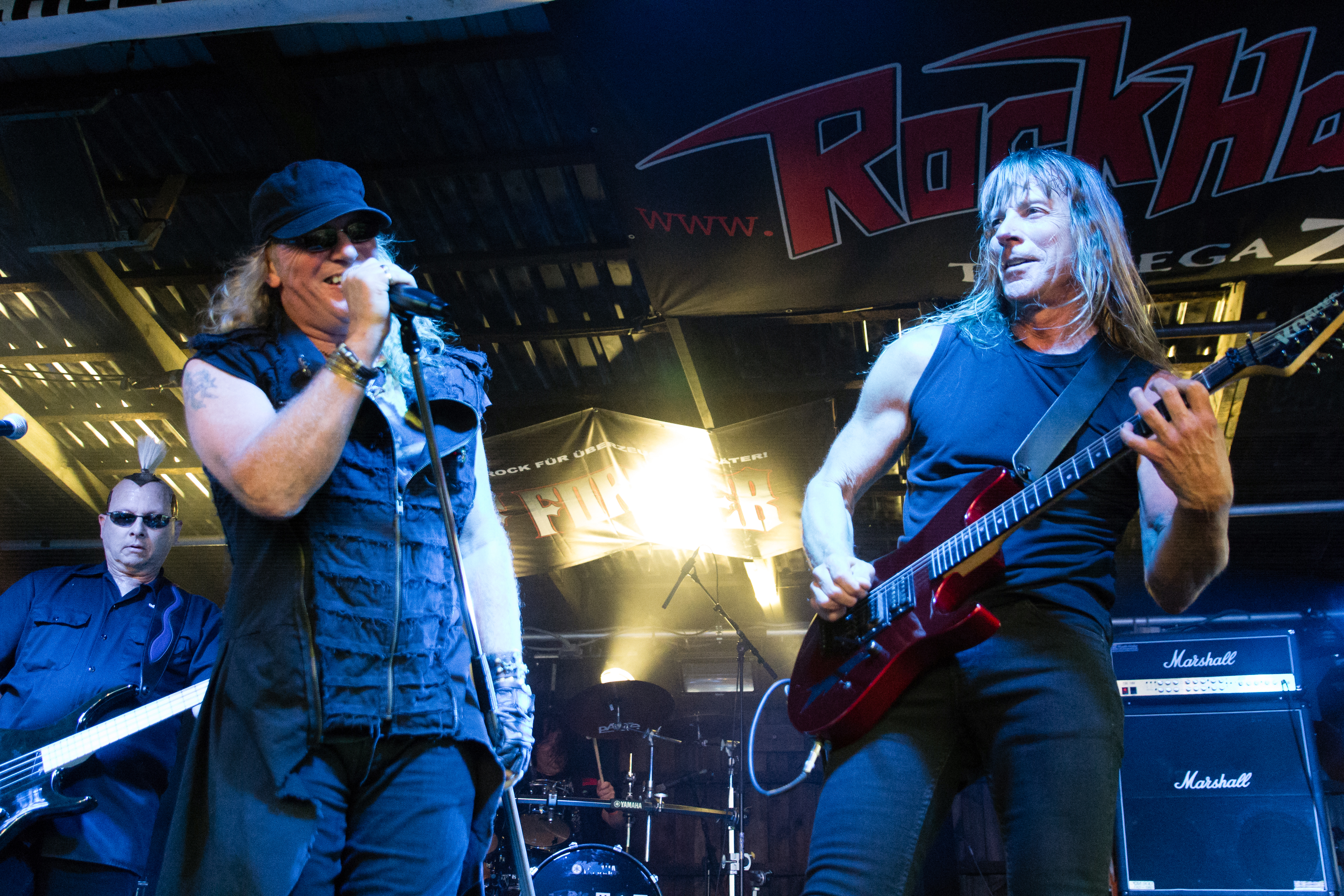
Q5 at Headbangers Open Air 2016

=== Current line-up ===
- Jonathan Scott K. – lead vocals
- Duffy Delgado – guitar
- Michael David – guitar
- Chad Thomas – bass
- Jarratt VanDyke – drums

=== Founding members ===
- Jonathan Scott K. – lead vocals
- Floyd D. Rose – guitar
- Rick Pierce – guitar
- Gary Thompson – drums
- Evan Sheeley – bass/keyboard

=== Reunion tour line-up 2014–2019 ===
- Jonathan Scott K. – lead vocals
- Rick Pierce – guitar
- Evan Sheeley – bass (1984-1989) (2003-2019)
- Dennis Turner – guitar
- James Nelson – guitar
- Jeffrey A. McCormack – drums

== Discography ==
=== Albums ===
- 1984 – Steel the Light (Music For Nations)
- 1986 – When the Mirror Cracks (Polygram)
- 2016 – New World Order (Frontiers Records)

=== Demos ===
- 1983 – Demo
- 1984 – Demo 1984

=== Singles ===
- 1985 – "Steel the Light"
- 1986 – "Living on the Borderline"
- 2016 – "The Right Way"
