= Phil Petillo =

- Born: Phillip J. Petillo; September 4, 1945
- Origin: United States
- Died: August 13, 2010 (aged 64)
- Occupation: Luthier
- Website: www.petilloguitars.com

Phillip J. Petillo (September 4, 1945 – August 13, 2010) was an American luthier. In the 1970s he built prototypes for Travis Bean and Gary Kramer for what would become Kramer Guitars.

== Education ==
Petillo's educational training included a Bachelor of Science degree in Industrial Engineering from Columbia University (1967), a master's degree in Industrial Science from LaSalle University (1969). He later received an honorary bachelor's degree from Eastern Virginia Graduate School of Medicine (1984) and a PhD in Engineering Technology from LaSalle University (1990). He was an apprentice of John D'Angelico and also of D'Angelico's, Jimmy DiSerio.

== Career ==
Aside from his guitar making, he was also the former Director of Engineering at Millennium Cell Inc. and designed and invented hydrogen fuel cells known as Hydrogen On Demand, hydrogen from sodium borohydride generators for DaimlerChrysler. Even after the developing company Millennium Cell closed in 2008, Petillo continued with the product.

== Patent ==
In the guitar circle, Petillo is most famous as the inventor of the "Petillo Precision Fret." In a patent filed on June 22, 1976, the new fret was described as "a substantially T-shaped fret for a stringed instrument which has an elongated stem topped by a triangularly shaped cap." Petillo's triangular frets result in more precise intonation; however, not all guitarists are comfortable with their rigid feel. The Revolutionary Drumstick Patent of Petillo was sold to Ambico at the NAMM Convention in GA, 1977

== Manufacturing ==
In 1970, Dennis Berardi and Gary Kramer asked Phil Petillo Master Luthier-Engineer to design and build 4 prototypes of a new neck made out of aluminum and wood. When Berardi and Kramer first came to the Petillo Home Workshop, they offered the guitar to be called PETILLO and Phil refused for he knew from past experiences in the Music Industry that often one loses one's good name with such offers that are appealing when the need demands it. Petillo designed the guitar with a forked headstock. When La Placa and investor Henry Vaccaro joined forces to open a plant in Neptune, New Jersey, they needed Petillo. The first four prototypes of Kramer Guitars were hand made in 1976 at the 1206 Herbert Ave. Ocean, NJ Studio Workshop by Phil Petillo. These unique guitars were photographed for the first Kramer Brochure that was introduced at the 1977 NAMM show in Chicago, Illinois in 1976. At that show, the fledgling guitar company sold $250,000 based on the interest generated from the 4 prototype guitars. Ironically, they had no guitars since the factory had yet to be set up. Petillo helped design and set up the factory located in Neptune and proceeded to build the First Fingerboard Machine that cut the slots in all fingerboards to Petillo's Trade Secret Scales with Perfect Intonation. These designs and prototypes were kept in a guarded Safe in Dennis Berardi's office at the Neptune Factory.

By the time the next NAMM show, one year later in Atlanta, GA 1977, after Petillo organized the factory, set up, scaled fingerboards, then he was pushed out. Petillo saw things in the factory that were compromised for profit that he could not tolerate as a Luthier of the highest ethical standards. Due to extreme differences regarding payment and quality control, La Placa, Berrardi et al. forced Petillo out after he had given the supreme sacrifice of his own business with Total Responsibility for completing this intense project of design, building from scratch these four guitars that were used to get endorsements from Stanley Clark and others in his home workshop, witnessed by his wife business partner, Lucille Petillo that propelled the Kramer Company under BKL to early success. Later they also eliminated Gary Kramer. Petillo did not receive compensation but instead was methodically forced out after all of his contributions that started the company. Their unethical behavior after Petillo organized the production of the first Kramers keeping quality control as a priority was unethical. Factory quality violations in Neptune, New Jersey plus lack of payment for his contributions of designing, building, and quality control along with disagreements with Peter LaPlaca and Lucille Petillo, Phil was forced out of the company. An article was written by Phillip and Lucille Petillo that appeared in the NAMM issue of Musical Merchandise Review describing in detail how these unique guitars were made featuring the construction of the Kramer Neck. (MMR Issue, October 1, 1976)

The Kramer factory was originally located at 1111 Green Grove Road, Neptune, NJ 07753 before moving to a larger facility at 685 Neptune Boulevard, Neptune NJ 07753.

Notable clients included Bruce Springsteen and members of his band such as Nils Lofgren and Garry Tallent, Tom Petty, Keith Richards, Steve Miller, Jim Croce, Johnny Cash, James Taylor, Loverboy, former Elvis Presley band members, Paul McCartney and Tal Farlow and Paul Stanley of Kiss, a one-off White "Flying V" with a bolt on neck and rewired Guild pickups. Petillo and Springsteen were friends and actually from the same neighborhood when Petillo sold him a Fender Esquire which Springsteen continues to use. In 1985, Springsteen once waited six hours in Petillo's basement for him to finish furnishing his guitar for a concert. A guitar made by Petillo was featured on Springsteen's album Born to Run. Petillo was also friends with Croce and once repaired his Martin D-35. He also invented and promoted a line of strings for Tommy DeVito and The Four Seasons.

He also performed some work for the Smithsonian Institution including a Stradivarius which arrived in an armored truck.

In a 2012 book, luthier Bob Benedetto was quoted as saying "I had an advantage in 1968 when I started, because there were only a few achtop makers including Sam Koontz, Jimmy D'Aquisto, Phil Petillo, and Bill Barker".

In 2004, he was honored for his inventions by the Research and Development Council of New Jersey. His son, David, who worked with him for several years, continued Petillo's work after his death. One of David's feats to Springsteen's guitar was adding "Asbury Park", "New Jersey" and silhouettes of Springsteen's redhead wife, Patti, and E Street Band saxophonist Clarence Clemons.
