= Pétillon =

Pétillon may refer to:

Places

- Pétillon metro station, Brussels, Belgium
- a hamlet near Fleurbaix, Hauts de France, France

People

- René Pétillon (1945–2018), French satirical and political cartoonist
- Léon Pétillon (1903–1996), governor-general of Belgian Congo

== See also ==
- Petillo
