= Fender Showmaster =

Electric guitar

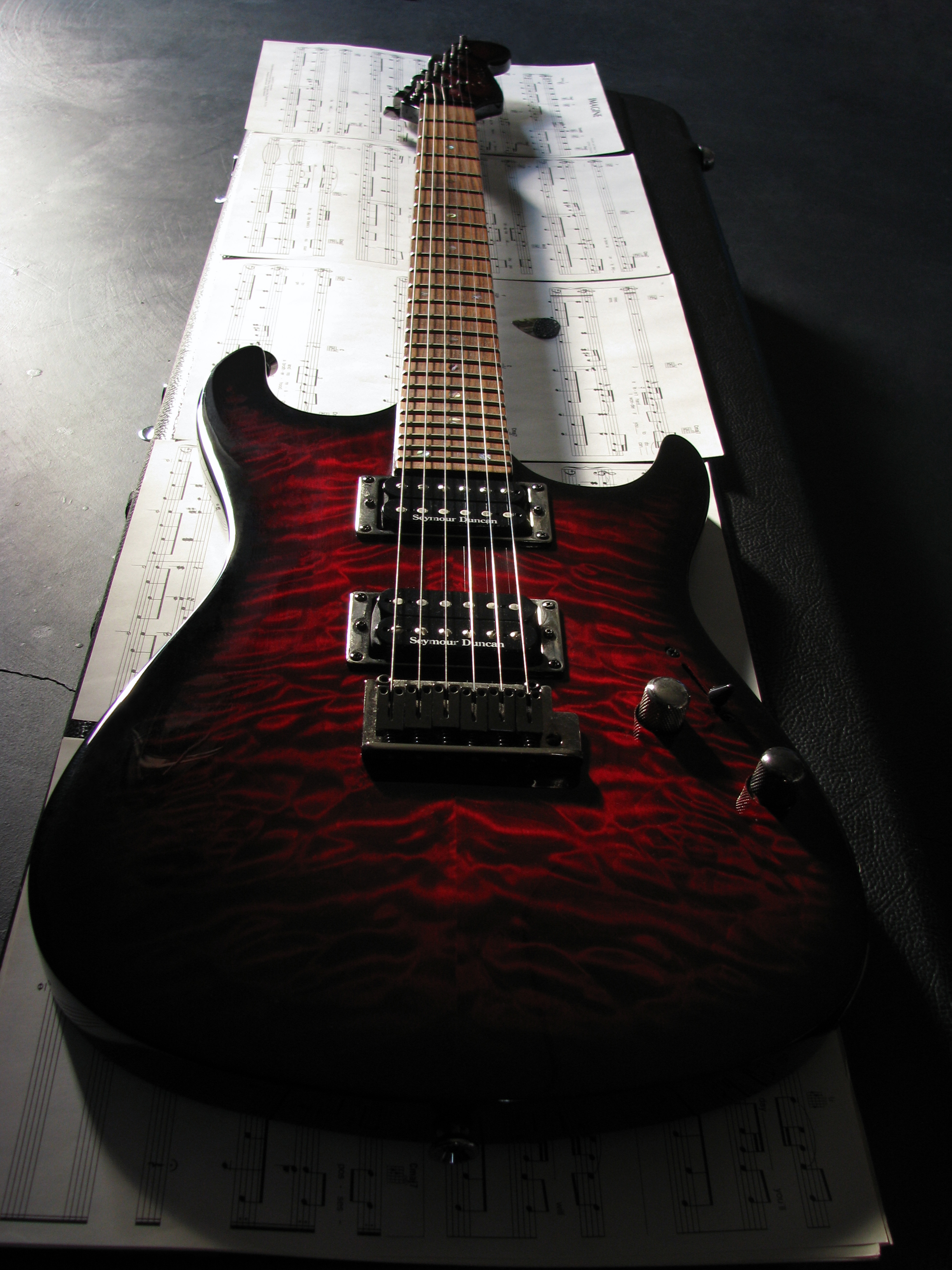
Fender Showmaster

The Fender Showmaster is a discontinued model of electric guitar made by Fender, and is characteristic of a superstrat.

== History ==
The Showmaster was introduced in 1998. The initial Custom Shop Showmaster was a design supplied by John Suhr, a senior Master Builder during that era. It started out as a US version of the Contemporary Stratocaster and featured two Fender Texas Special pickups in the neck and middle positions, a Seymour Duncan '59 Jeff Beck Trembucker in the lead position, a white pearloid pickguard and a deluxe locking tremolo bridge. Later, after Suhr left, the Showmaster was turned into a back-routed, carved-top, and set neck design.

The main distinguishing feature of Fender Showmasters from other superstrats is the carved maple top (quilted or flamed) with cream binding. The Showmaster series also included a short-lived 7-string version with a stop-tail bridge that had been introduced around 1999/2000 and discontinued two years later. Squier, Fender's budget marque, also produced the Showmaster, including a Jason Ellis signature model. In 2009, all Showmaster models were discontinued.
