= Henry Vaccaro =

American businessman and author

Henry V. Vaccaro is an American businessman and author. His primary business was the Henry V. Vaccaro Corporation, located in Neptune, NJ. The construction company, started in 1964, built over $1 Billion in construction projects throughout New Jersey. These projects included hospitals, prisons, schools, and nursing homes.

== Kramer Guitars ==
In 1976, he was the main investor and owner of Kramer Guitars in Neptune, NJ.

In 1993, Henry Vaccaro sold the Kramer Guitar Company to Jackson Communications Inc, formed by the family of superstar Michael Jackson. However, missed payments by JCI led to a lawsuit by Vaccaro, who obtained judgments against many of the family members. Vaccaro, with the help of detective Frank Coonis and attorney Steve Fernandez, uncovered and ultimately seized many of the Jackson family's assets, including the largest collection of Jackson family memorabilia.

Vaccaro was sued by Michael Jackson in 2004, for $100,000,000.00. The cause of action included copyright infringement, cyber squatting, false designation of name, and the Latham Act, among others. Vaccaro won, as the suit was dismissed by the judge "with prejudice."

== Involvement in Asbury Park redevelopment ==
In 1983, Henry, along with his brother Sebastian and friends Johnny Cash and TV news anchor Ernie Anastos purchased and refurbished the Berkeley-Carteret Hotel, a $16 million restoration project. The hotel opened to rave reviews in 1985, and went on to win numerous awards, including a national award in Washington, DC, for the best project in the United States that utilized both public and private funds.

In 1985, Henry and Sebastian purchased over 40 properties in Asbury Park, and formed a partnership with Carabetta Enterprises, Inc., a Connecticut company. The partnership, known as Carabetta Vaccaro Developers LLC, was awarded a waterfront redevelopment contract by the City of Asbury Park, NJ.

The Vaccaro brothers eventually sold their shares in the development to partner Carabetta Enterprises. But due to the real estate collapse in the early 1990s, the project failed. Ultimately, Vaccaro negotiated terms between Carabetta, the City of Asbury Park, and another entity known as Asbury Partners (which was later bought out by iStar Financial).

== Relationship with Johnny Cash ==
In 2013, Henry Vaccaro wrote an autobiography chronicling his 30-year friendship with Johnny Cash (which lasted until Cash's death in 2003). Vaccaro served as an honorary pallbearer at his funeral. Rosanne Cash said of the memoir, "I have wonderful memories of my dad's decades-long friendship with the wonderful Henry Vaccaro, and his book vividly brought them back to life."
