= Zero fret =

Fret in the headstock of a stringed instrument

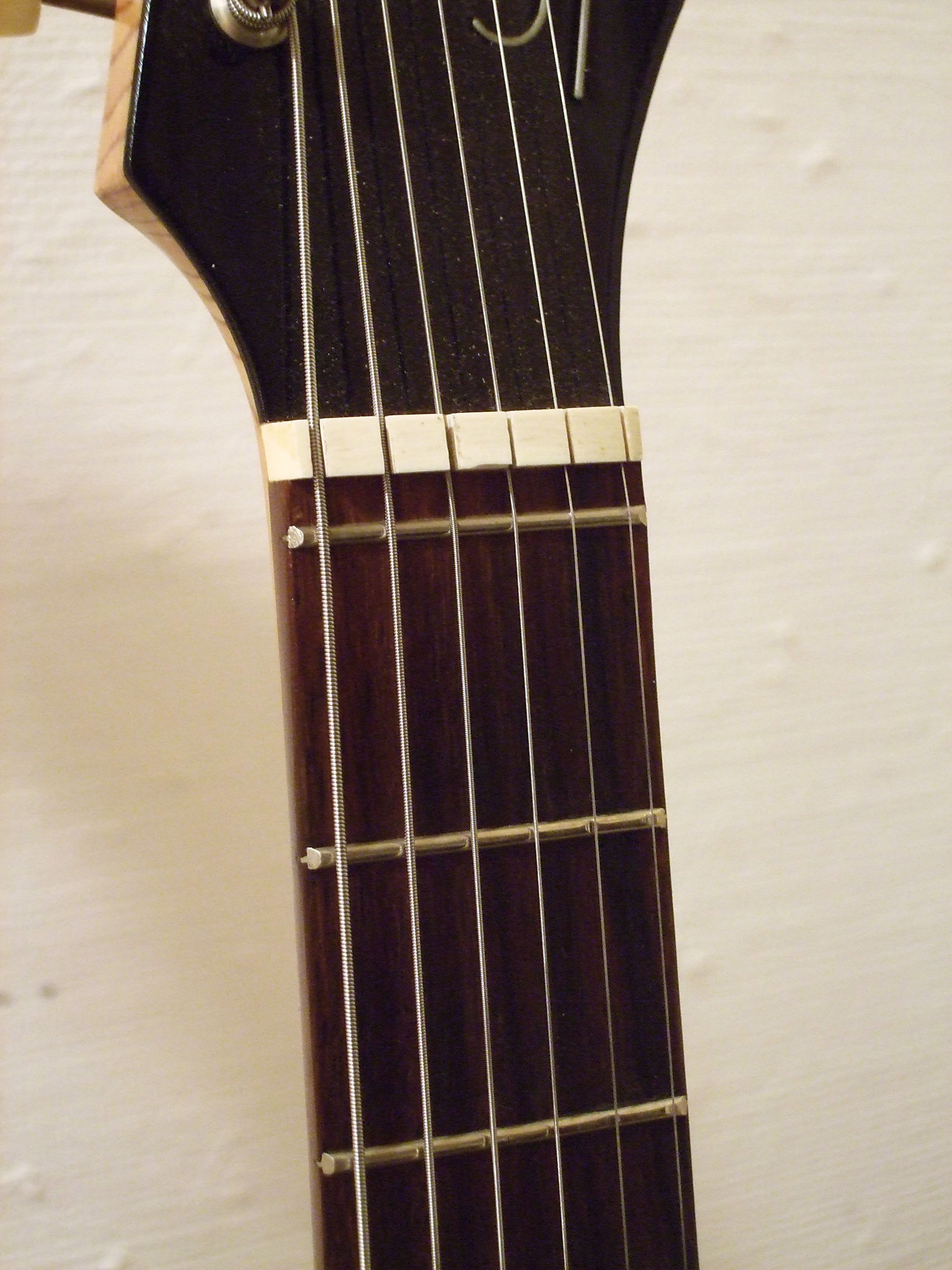
Zero fret on a Hopf Saturn 63 electric guitar.

A zero fret is a fret placed at the headstock end of the neck of a banjo, guitar, mandolin, or bass guitar. It serves one of the functions of a nut: holding the strings the correct distance above the other frets on the instrument's fretboard. A separate string-guide (often a regular nut) is still required to establish the correct string spacing when a zero fret is used.

== Function ==
The zero fret is positioned at the location normally occupied by the nut. On a guitar having a zero fret, the nut is located behind the zero fret and serves solely to keep the strings spaced properly. The strings are bent over the fret and rest on it as if one were pressing on them behind the fret. The zero fret is generally at the same height as all the others. Some people prefer and feel more comfortable with the zero fret slightly taller than the rest of the frets. The zero fret functions as all other frets do.

== Purpose ==
It is claimed that with a zero fret, the sound of an open string more closely approximates the sound of a fretted string as compared to the open string sound on a guitar with no zero fret. This gives all notes a more similar and consistent timbre. Countering this claim are musicians who feel that a bone or even synthetic nut will enhance the overall tone of the instrument regardless of the string being played open or fretted.

Some manufacturers that frequently use(d) a zero fret are Gretsch, Kay, Selmer, Höfner, Mosrite, Framus, Vox, Vigier, Harley Benton and bass guitar manufacturer MTD. Now very few manufacturers use this design and those who do list it as a feature. Steinberger uses a zero fret with their headless guitars but omit the nut; strings are mounted in place where the head would normally be, so there is no need for the string guides that the nut provides. 2015 model year Gibson guitars incorporate a zero fret in order to accommodate a brass adjustable nut, which the manufacturer claims causes better sustain and intonation. The British acoustic guitar manufacturer Fylde Guitars uses a zero fret as standard.

== Drawbacks ==
Low string action (distance between string and fret wire) results from a non-elevated zero fret when using the same fingerboard fret wire size. On some guitars it may be necessary to raise the bridge saddle height by a small amount.

== Advantages ==
A large number of different gauges of strings can be used. Strings reside on top of the zero fret regardless of thickness, and have the same distance travel down to the first fret. If you have cut the grooves into the nut for thick strings, it may be necessary to change the nut out completely in order to go back to lighter gauge strings. On zero fret, this isn't needed.

A conventional nut made of relatively soft plastic or bone will easily clamp the string and make fine tuning difficult. The clamping effect does not only result from too narrow nut slots, but notably more from the impression of the string windings into the nut material at the bottom of the slot. That effect is more prevalent with wire wound nylon strings than with steel strings. Using a zero fret relieves the pressure from the nut material and the nut serves only to center the strings sideways. Tuning is smooth and without sudden movement and intonation jumps. There are only a few manufacturers making metal (bronze) conventional nuts which avoid the string clamping effect.

== Elevated and Straight Zero Fret ==
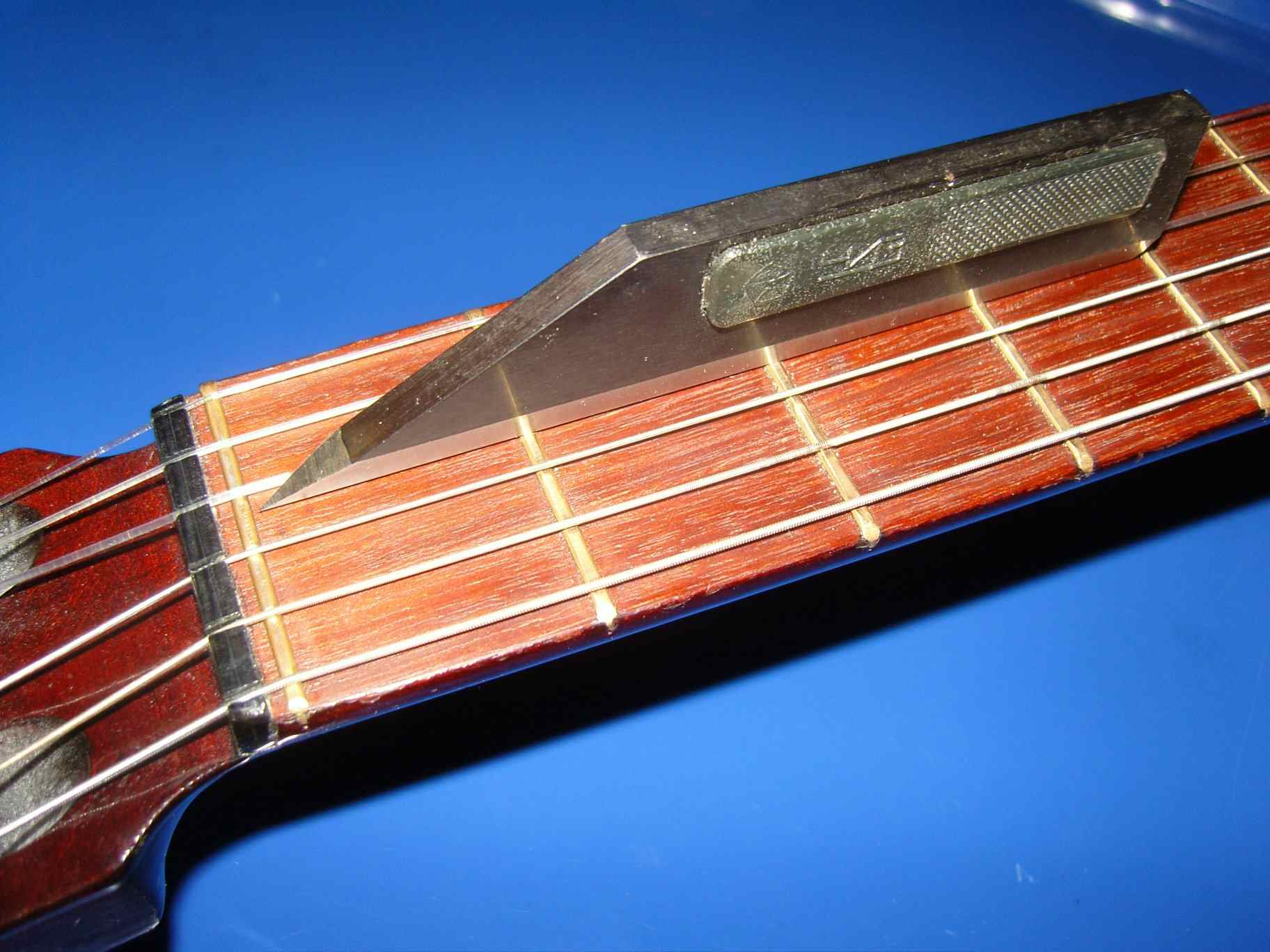
Checking for zero fret height.

When the zero fret is viewed as an extension of the fingerboard by adding one more fret wire before the nut, then the luthier would fit a fret wire of identical dimensions. This will decrease the string action at the lower fret positions. To avoid this effect, luthiers often use a thicker fret wire at the zero fret position. While the straight and level zero fret improves the tuning accuracy along the lower frets (from fret 1 to 3 mainly) the elevated fret keeps the string action higher and helps to avoid string buzz.

== Intonation Issues ==
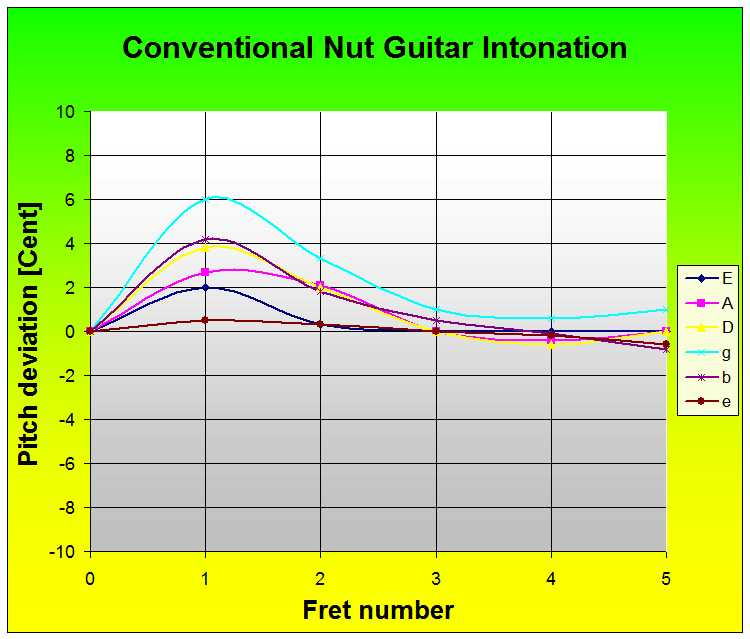
Guitar with nut.

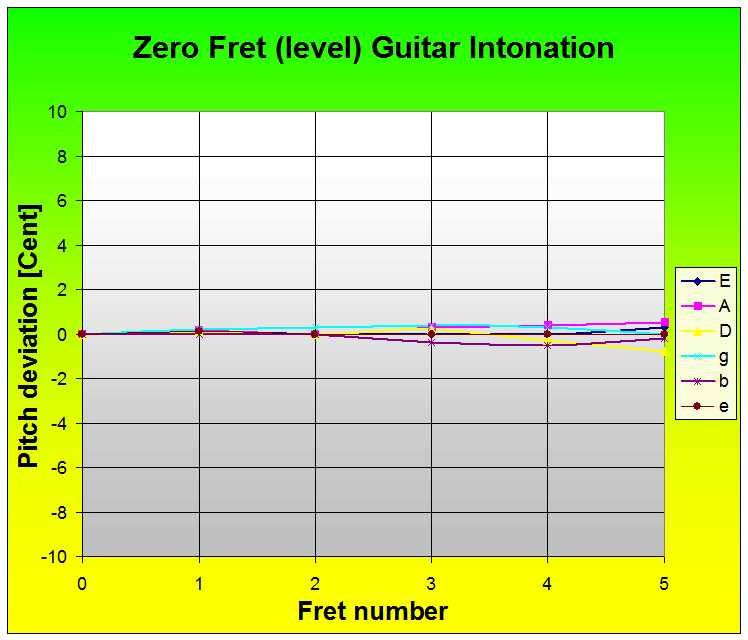
Guitar w. zero fret.

The term "guitar intonation" denotes to what precision the ideal equally tempered musical scale can be produced by a guitar, while "piano intonation" refers to the setup procedure of the individual hammers in the piano keyboard. A conventional nut or an elevated zero fret will cause pitch errors on the lower frets due to the increased pressure on the strings. The fret distances would have to be corrected for that increased tension effect, but with guitars that is not common.

On the contrary, the "level" zero fret will have no pitch errors on the fingered notes. This can be demonstrated by measuring the pitch deviation of each single note on the fingerboard. Players who frequently use the lower frets from 0 to 5 will benefit most from a zero fret. Using mainly the upper range of the fingerboard neutralizes the advantage of the zero fret and conventional nuts are equally suited. Those players usually avoid playing first and second fret positions because of the pitch problems there. For beginners a zero fretted guitar is preferable.

Guitars are often manufactured with rather high string action and high conventional nuts. The end user is expected to adjust nut height to their personal playing style. At a point of sale, the purchaser might be confronted with sales personnel unfamiliar with this type of equipment design that a buyer may have to take extra time to learn to properly set up the guitar. Guitars with zero frets would be helpful in that situation.

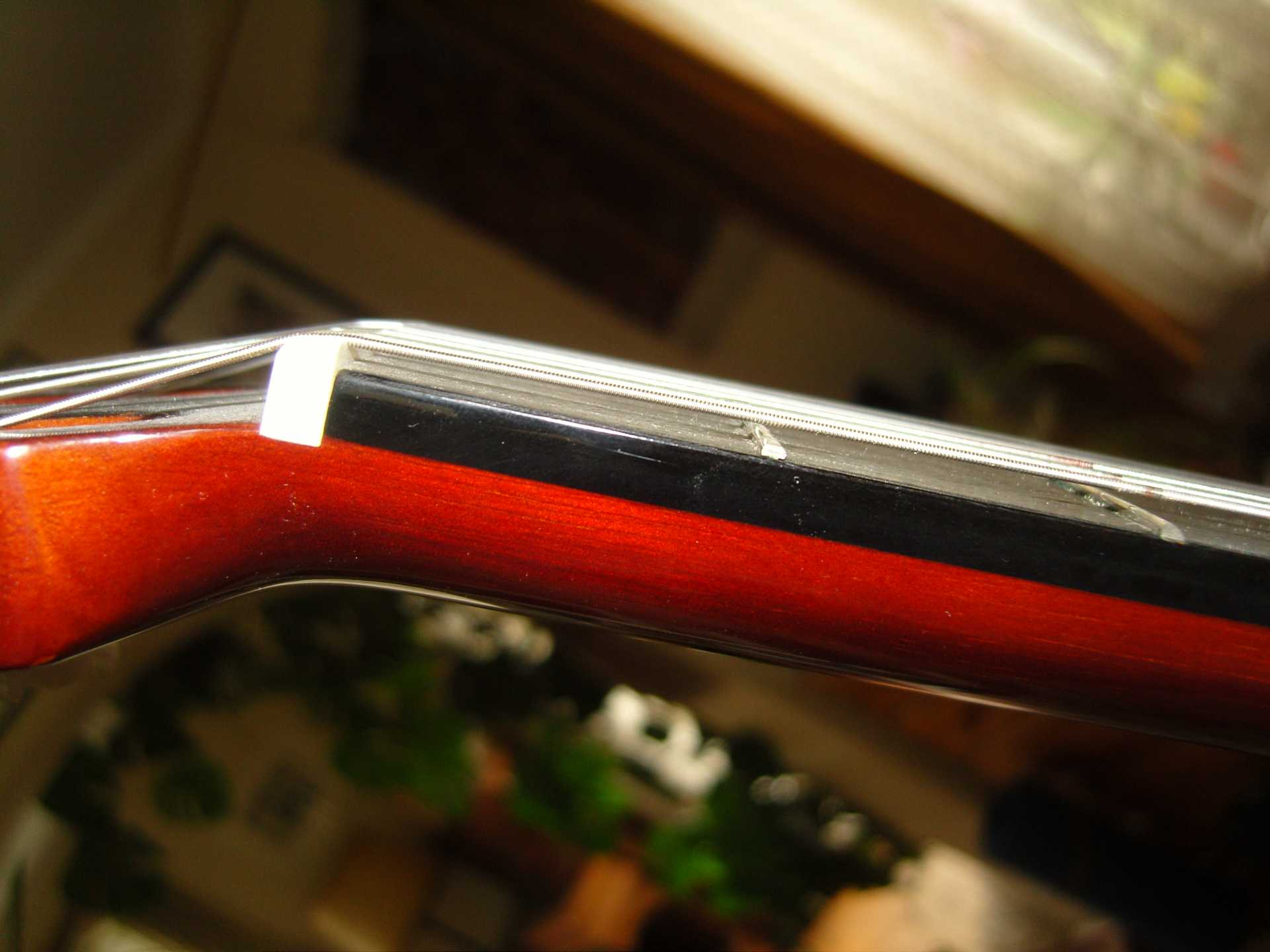
High nut.

The photograph shows a high conventional nut on a factory-made Japanese concert guitar and may serve to illustrate the necessity for evaluating the advantages and the drawbacks of modern guitar manufacturing. The high string tension makes the instrument almost unplayable for beginner students, especially for children, and additionally serves to spoil the ear training for harmonies and tone intervals due to intonation errors. Luthier intervention is required in such cases.

High string action at the nut is often preferred to avoid string buzz with heavy playing style. The lower fret area is therefore out of tune. A partial solution is to apply nut corrections by reducing the distance from the nut to fret one for a small amount and then re-tune the now shorter string. That procedure lowers the tuning of all the other notes on the complete string and compromises have to be found. It may no longer be feasible to tune the open string to its base tone. Some manufacturers suggest tuning at the third or fifth fret using electronic tuners.

== See also ==
- Nut (string instrument)
