= Nut (string instrument) =

Part of a stringed instrument

The nuts of some common instruments

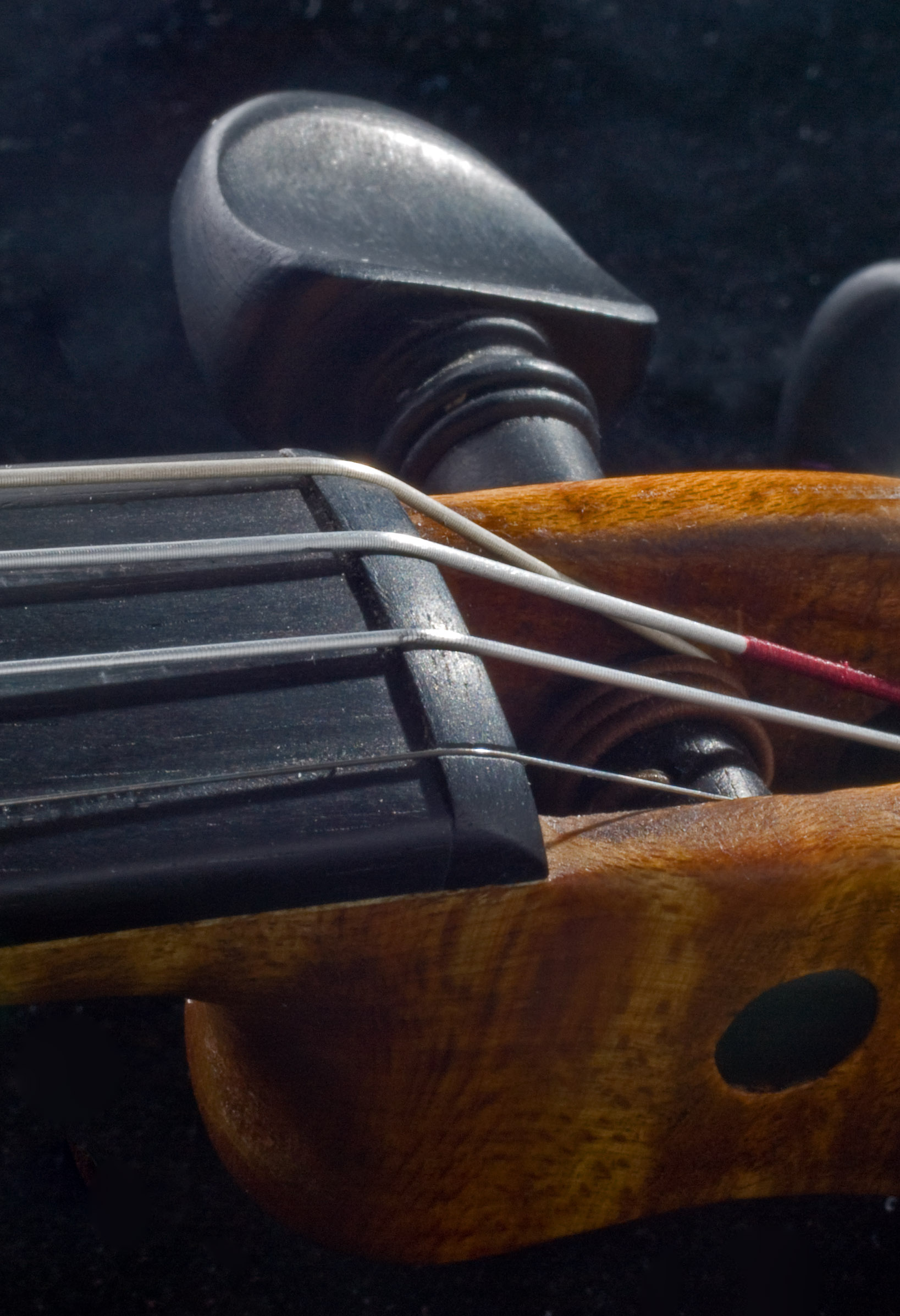
Violin

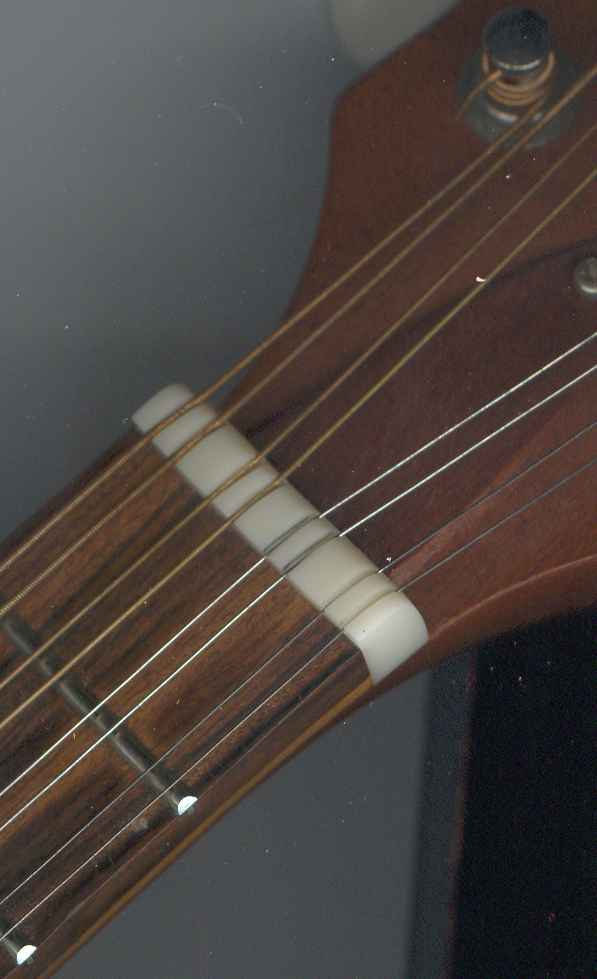
Mandolin

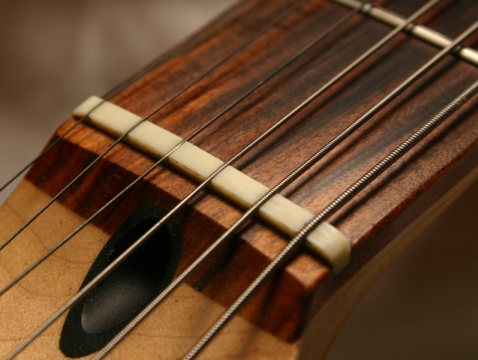
Guitar

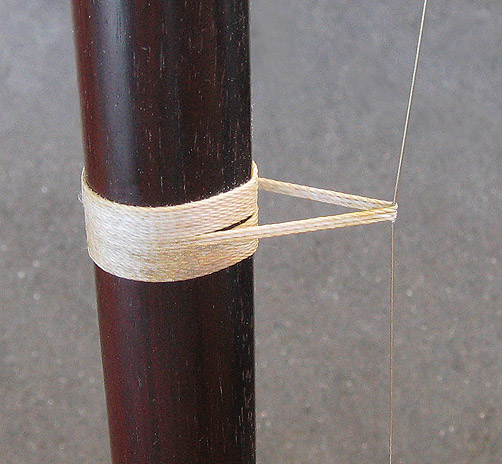
Erhu

A nut, on a stringed musical instrument, is a small piece of hard material that supports the strings at the end closest to the headstock or scroll. The nut marks one end of the vibrating length of each open string, sets the spacing of the strings across the neck, and usually holds the strings at the proper height from the fingerboard. Along with the bridge, the nut defines the scale lengths (vibrating length) of the open strings.

The nut may be made of ebony, ivory, cow bone, brass, Corian, Tusq or plastic, and is usually notched or grooved for the strings. The grooves are designed to lead the string from the fingerboard to the headstock or pegbox in a smooth curve, to prevent damage to the strings or their windings. Bowed string instruments in particular benefit from an application of soft pencil graphite in the notches of the nut, to preserve the delicate flat windings of their strings.

== Etymology ==
The word may have come from the German Nut (pronounced "noot"), meaning groove or slot. The nut, however, is called a Sattel ("saddle"; also Obersattel) in German, whereas the part of a guitar known as the saddle in English, the surface of the bridge on which the strings rest, is called a Stegeinlage or Steg, in German. In French, the nut is known as a sillet, which, like German, can also translate to mean saddle. The Italian term, capo tasto (or capotasto; "head of fretboard"), is the origin of the capo.

== Variations ==
Not all string instruments have nuts as described. The nuts on some instruments are notched deeply enough that they are just string spacers. These instruments use a zero fret—a fret at the beginning of the scale where a normal nut would be that provides the correct string clearance. The zero fret is often found on less expensive instruments, as it is easier to set up an instrument this way. However, a zero fret also makes the sound of the open string similar to fretted notes. A conventional nut can make open strings sound slightly different—and for this reason some high-end instruments use a zero fret.

String slots in a nut without a zero fret must be cut to the proper depth to make string height correct. Strings that are too low at the nut can buzz against the frets, and too high throws off intonation of fretted notes.

An intonation error occurs when the frequency of the note produced at a given fret does not match the intended frequency, such as with equal temperament for a guitar. This happens because the string is stretched slightly as it is pressed down to the fret. The stretching increases the tension, which increases the frequency. Since some distance is required for the string above the frets (called the "action") in order to prevent the string from rattling on the fret as it vibrates, these errors are inherent in the system. This is especially evident on the first few frets of a guitar. Many guitar players notice how 'open position' chords (Such as E, A, C, D and G) never sound in tune with each other. It is common to attempt to compensate for these errors by moving the saddle a small distance beyond the scale length, so that the frequency when the string is pressed to the fret is closer to the target frequency. This helps, but moving just the saddle can never fully compensate for the stretching, leaving an error of about five cents on the first fret.

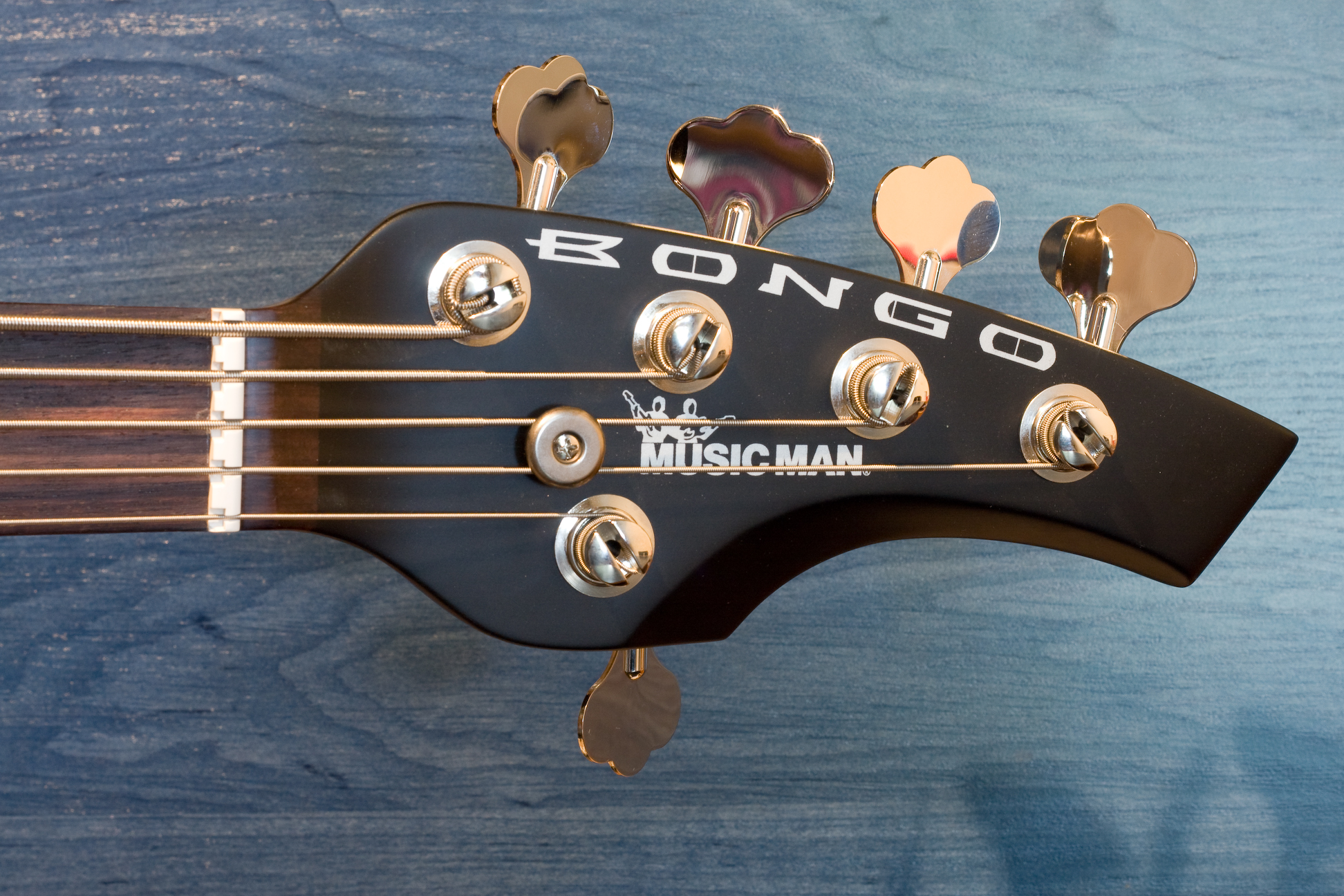
Compensated nut on a Music Man Bongo 5 bass guitar

For this reason, some fretted instruments have a compensated nut. It is a common misconception that moving the nut can not affect a fretted note, since the nut is behind the vibrating portion of the string, but since the cause of the error is the stretching of the string, moving the nut does indeed affect the amount of stretching and so the fretted frequency.

This type of nut provides better average intonation across the instrument, although this improved accuracy may be below the threshold of human ability to hear it and may also be below the threshold of uncontrollable note-to-note intonation variability. A compensated nut aims to correct this, by staggering the starting position of each string according to string mass, tension, action, relief, etc. Some nut compensation systems are approximate but create a noticeable difference in tuning within chords. For example, acoustic guitars have historically moved the nut a small uniform amount, which significantly improves intonation. Some guitar companies, such as Music Man, and ESP, include compensated nuts as standard on most of their instruments, and companies such as Earvana provide retrofittable types. Some systems create nearly perfect compensation, having but a small error (less than 1 cent) only on the first fret, and errors on the other frets of zero. This is also the goal of the true temperament fretboard.

Another type is a locking nut. This nut—usually used in conjunction with a locking vibrato system such as a Floyd Rose or Kahler—clamps the strings against the nut. This improves tuning stability when using the vibrato bar. A drawback however, is that the locking nut must be loosened using an Allen wrench to tune outside the range of the fine tuners on the bridge (if present).

The erhu does not use a hard nut to define the vibrating length of the open string, but rather a qiān jin (千斤), a loop of string, or, less commonly, a metal hook.

Some guitars have a rolling nut. In this design, made popular by Fender, the strings sit on roller bearings instead of nut slots. The rollers let the string freely slide or roll through the nut. The roller nut helps keep the guitar in tune by preventing the strings from getting stuck in the nut.

== Keyboard instruments ==
The term "nut" also refers to bridges on certain keyboard instruments. On harpsichords, it designates the non-sounding bridge located near the tuning pins away from the player. On virginals, the term usually designates the bridge on the left side, away from the tuning pins. The term is not always applied consistently.
