= Vigier Guitars =

French musical instruments company

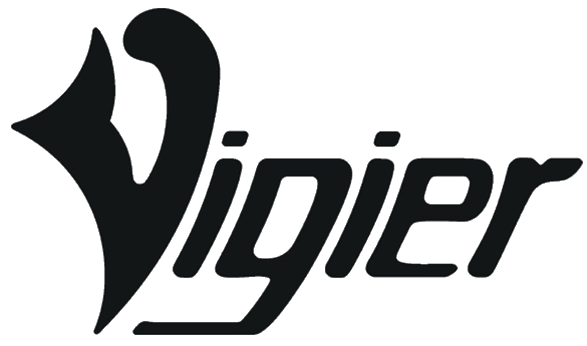
- Company type: Ltd., SARL
- Industry: Musical instruments
- Founded: 1980; 46 years ago
- Founder: Patrice Vigier
- Defunct: 2025
- Headquarters: Grigny, Essonne, France
- Area served: Worldwide
- Key people: Patrice Vigier, DJ Scully, Ben Whatsley
- Products: Electric guitars, basses, strings
- Parent: self-owned
- Divisions: High Tech Distribution
- Website: vigierguitars.com

Vigier Guitars was a French musical instruments company based in Grigny, Essonne and founded by Patrice Vigier in 1980. In addition to manufacturing, the company was also active in the import and wholesale distribution of musical instruments, amplifiers and accessories through its division High Tech Distribution.

The company manufactured electric guitars, basses, and strings.

== History ==
Patrice Vigier, a self-taught luthier from les Ulis, began modifying guitars and building finished necks at the end of the 1970s. He later built his first fretless guitar with a glass fingerboard. Through a friend, Philippe Lacour of Distribution Music, Vigier met his first customers in Montparnasse. In 1980, he founded the company, Vigier, and introduced his first model, the Arpege, at a music fair. That guitar featured:

- Neck-through construction with a trapezoidal extension
- Metal reinforcement board underneath the fingerboard
- Metal fretboard on the fretless version
- Active electronics
- A fixed bridge
- Benedetti custom humbuckers

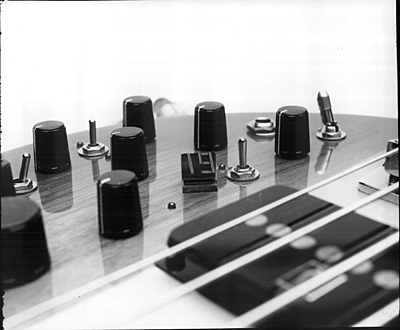
The Nautilus System (1982)

In 1981, instead of using standard batteries, Vigier powered its electronics with a rechargeable power supply. In 1983, another model came equipped with a built-in equalizer and sound memory system called Nautilus. Vigier launched two other models: the Passion in 1983 and the Marilyn in 1985. In 1986, Vigier diversified by creating a wholesale division to import and distribute instruments, amplifiers, and accessories. Distributed brands included Ampeg, DiMarzio, Ernie Ball, Music Man, Orange, Premier, and Trace Elliot. Two years later, Vigier renamed the division High Tech Distribution to separate the manufacturing and distribution operations. In the 1990s, Vigier introduced new models. The Excalibur came in 1991, its fretless variant, the Surfreter in 1998, and the Excess bass in 1996.

In 2000, Vigier celebrated its 20th anniversary with an Excalibur Surfreter adorned with gold, diamonds, sapphires, and emeralds. The instrument was valued at EUR 30,000. In the same year, the company launched the Expert, a model inspired by the classic Fender Stratocaster. Vigier also developed a guitar with a MIDI-controlled selector, volume, and tone knob. The company presented a prototype at the 2003 Frankfurt music fair, but never finalized the project as Patrice Vigier never approved the final version. In the second half of the 2000s, Vigier began introducing signature models—including the Excalibur Shawn Lane in 2005, and the Excalibur Bumblefoot Ron Thal and Excess Roger Glover in 2006. In 2009 Vigier introduced its model singlecut, G.V., in reference to Georges Vigier, Patrice's late father.

In 2025, Patrice Vigier posted on the forums that he has retired and no longer makes any instruments.

== Models ==
=== Electric guitars ===
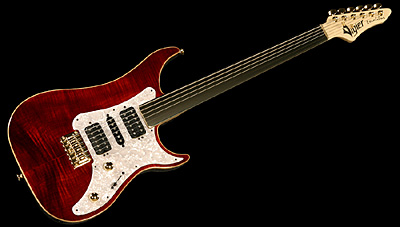
Fretless guitar

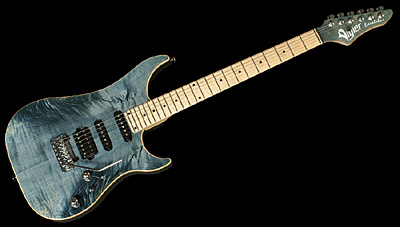
Excalibur Ultra Blues

- Arpege
- Passion
- Excalibur
- G.V.
- Expert
- Marilyn
- Bfoot
- DoubleBfoot

=== Basses ===
- Arpege
- Excess
- Passion

== Manufacturing ==
Vigier produced all their instruments in France. Vigier made each guitar or bass in three to five months—partly by hand and partly with machines. Woods—such as alder, maple, and ash—came from French forests. Rosewood and mahogany were imported from India and Honduras respectively. Pre-cut raw wood logs were sorted and dried naturally for three to seven years to achieve the desired moisture content. Bodies and necks were drawn on the blanks using templates—then cut, dried, and stored in a controlled environment. In addition to wood, Vigier used other materials such as copper and steel alloys (Delta metal and iMetal) and Phenowood, a resin-based composite material.

Vigier built bodies from two pieces. They machined cuts and bevels with CNC tools, and made fingerboards corrected to within 1/100 of a millimeter. The necks are fitted with the 90/10 design (90% wood, 10% carbon) whereby a carbon reinforcement bar replaces an adjustable truss rod. They did the rest of the operations by hand. Instrument weight is maintained between 3 and 3.7 kg. Instruments are hand finished with about ten layers of stain and clear coat to a thickness of approximately 0.7 mm. Glue and finish are dried for five weeks.

Guitars and basses have stainless steel frets, a zero fret, a teflon nut, oversized locking tuners, DiMarzio potentiometers, and Neutrik locking jacks. Cavities are shielded. Straps pegs are secured with deep inserts. For its floating bridge models, Vigier uses a system that rests on needle bearings. The company produced an average of 500 instruments a year.

== Awards ==
In 1992, Patrice Vigier was awarded "Luthier of the Year" in the electric guitar category. In 1993, the Excalibur was awarded the title of "Most Innovative Guitar of the Year" by the American magazine The Music And Sound Retailer. The American magazine Premier Guitar also has nominated Vigier's guitars, twice for the Premier Gear Awards: the G.V. Wood in 2011 and the Excalibur Special 7 in 2013.
