= List of guitars manufactured by ESP =

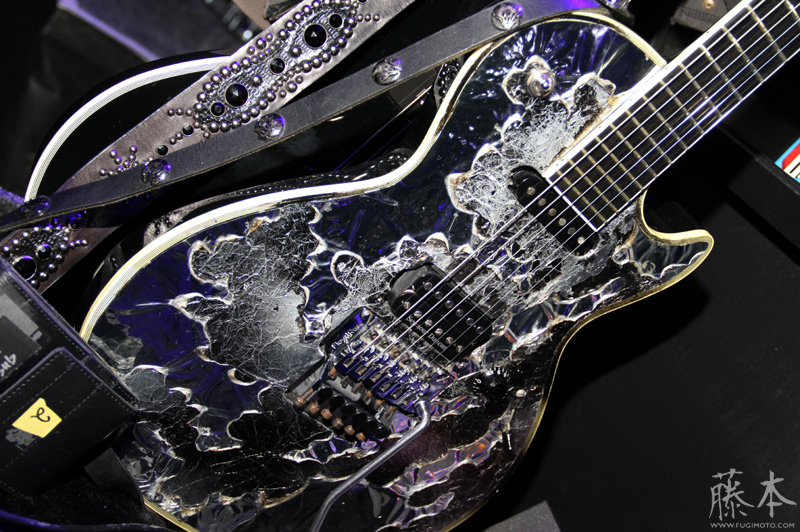
Luna Sea and X Japan guitarist Sugizo's signature ESP Eclipse S-VIII Brilliant MixedMedia guitar

This is a list of guitars manufactured by ESP Guitars.

== ESP Original Series (Japan) ==
=== Guitars ===
- ESP 400 Series - the first production line produced by ESP.
  - ESP S454
  - ESP S465
  - ESP T453
  - ESP T463
  - ESP P457
  - ESP P464
  - ESP J464
- ESP Forest
- ESP XJ
- ESP Horizon
- ESP Mirage
- ESP Maverick
- ESP Potbelly
- ESP Random Star
- ESP Snapper
- ESP SV
- ESP UltraTone
- ESP VIPER
- ESP Antelope
- ESP Throbber
- ESP Arrow
- ESP Aero

=== Basses ===
- ESP AP
- ESP Bottom Bump
- ESP Bottom Line
- ESP Forest
- ESP XJ
- ESP Halibut
- ESP Amaze
- ESP Viper

== ESP Standard Series (United States) ==
=== Guitars ===
- ESP Eclipse
- ESP FX
- ESP Horizon
- ESP M Series
- ESP NV
- ESP Vintage Plus
- ESP Viper
- ESP EX - The Explorer features a 24.75" scale. It has 22 XJ frets. It comes in a variety of colors, including see-through black, black, and white. Usually includes EMG 81/60 pickups.
- ESP Phoenix-II
- ESP SV-II
- ESP V-II

=== Basses ===
Including ESP's budget line, LTD

- ESP AX Series - produced in the United States and Europe. The design of the guitars in the AX Series is similar to that of the B.C. Rich Warlock. All of the AX guitars feature a string-thru body with a Tune-O-Matic Bridge. All of them also feature one volume and one tone control knob with a 3-way toggle with a pickup formation of H-H. The series began in 2003 with only the AX-350. In 2005, the AX-350 was discontinued and was replaced with the AX-400, AX-250, and the AX-50. The AX-250 is very similar to the AX-350 except that it is made with bolt-on neck construction instead of neck-thru like its predecessor and the pickups are not EMG HZs but instead are EMG-ESP LH-300's. Notable users of models in the AX Series include Makro, Peter Scheithauer, and Robb Flynn.
  - ESP LTD AX-50 - The AX-50 features bolt-on neck construction in a 25.5" scale. The fingerboard features dot inlays with the model name on the 12th fret. It has 24 extra jumbo frets. It comes in silver satin and black satin with black hardware.
  - ESP LTD AX-250
  - ESP LTD AX-260 - features neck-thru construction in a 25.5" scale. The fingerboard features a custom tribal inlay. It has 24 extra jumbo frets. It comes in black with black hardware.
  - ESP LTD AX-350
  - ESP LTD AX-400 - features set-in neck construction in a 25.5" scale. The fingerboard features a custom tribal inlay. It has 24 extra jumbo frets and an Earvana compensated nut. It comes in see-through black or see-through red with black hardware and white binding on the neck.
- ESP Bottom Line
- ESP D
- ESP Eclipse
- ESP EX Series
  - ESP EX-50 - comes in black or silver. It is the cheapest in the ESP/LTD EX range.
- ESP Forest
- ESP Surveyor
- ESP Vintage
- ESP VIPER

== LTD Deluxe Series (U.S. and Europe) ==
The Deluxe Series includes models based on the popular ESP product lines of Eclipse, MH, Horizon, M, and Viper guitars. They include many high-end features. The Deluxe Series began with only four models in 2003.

- ESP LTD EC-1000 BLK
- ESP LTD EC-1000 MGO
- ESP LTD EC-1000 SSB
- ESP LTD EC-1000 VB
- ESP LTD EC-1000FM
- ESP LTD EC-1000FR
- ESP LTD EC-1000QM
- ESP LTD H-1001
- ESP LTD H-1001FM
- ESP LTD H-1001FR
- ESP LTD M-1000
- ESP LTD MH-1000FR
- ESP LTD MH-1000NT
- ESP LTD VIPER-1000
- ESP LTD VIPER-1000FM

== ESP Custom Series ==
- ESP 901 - available in the German market only. Exclusively sold through the ESP Custom Shop in Düsseldorf between 1990 and 1995.
- ESP Alexi Laiho Series
  - ESP Alexi Laiho Arrow Head "Custom Shop" - available in the Japanese market only.
  - ESP Alexi Laiho Pink Saw Tooth "Custom Shop"
  - ESP Alexi Laiho Saw Tooth "Custom Shop"
  - ESP Alexi Laiho Signature Model - based on the guitar that Laiho plays, but with a longer lower section. It come in white with black pinstripes or black with yellow pinstripes.
  - ESP Alexi Laiho Scythe "Custom Shop"
  - ESP Alexi Laiho Scythe "Standard" - features an ebony fingerboard with scythe inlays.
  - ESP Edwards E-AL-128 Arrow Head
  - ESP Edwards E-AL-120 Saw Tooth
  - ESP Edwards E-AL-120 Scythe
  - ESP LTD Alexi - 200
  - ESP LTD Alexi - 600
  - ESP LTD Alexi - 600 SE
  - ESP USA Alexi Laiho "Custom Shop"
  - ESP USA Alexi Laiho "Standard"
- ESP Dan Jacobs EX - distributed as the ESP LTD DJ-600 - the same model as the guitars in the EX series, with several changes: the headstock is reversed, it uses an EMG 85 pickup in the neck rather than an EMG 60, it has Grover tuners, and it has a Floyd Rose bridge. The tone knob has been replaced by an EMG Afterburner.
- ESP Dave Mustaine - ESP produced several guitars based on the custom models of Dave Mustaine until 2007, when he left the brand for Dean Guitars. The DV models lack a 24th fret inlay.
  - ESP Axxion - fretboard is ebony with XX inlays and available in black.
  - ESP DV8 - fretboard is ebony with 8-Ball Inlay on first fret. It is available in black, snow white and metallic silver.
  - ESP LTD DV-200 - fretboard is rosewood with 8-Ball Inlay on first fret and available in black.
  - ESP LTD DV8-R - fretboard is rosewood with 8-Ball inlay on first fret. It is available in black, metallic silver and snow white, and a SE Flame Burst.
  - ESP LTD V-200
  - ESP LTD V-500
- ESP Kirk Hammett
  - ESP KH-1 - Flying V Model, 22 frets
  - ESP KH-2 - Black finished, Bolt-on construction, Skull-Crossbones inlays, EMG-81(B) EMG-60(N) pickups, 24 frets
  - ESP KH-2 Vintage - Black finished, Neck-thru-body construction, Skull-Crossbones inlays, EMG-81(B) EMG-60(N) pickups, 24 frets
  - ESP KH-3 - Black finished, Spider & Skull-Crossbones inlays, EMG-81(B) pickups, 24 frets
  - ESP KH-4 - Base on ESP M-II model, Black finished with White pearl pickguard, 24 frets
  - ESP KH-DC - STBC (See Thru Black Cherry) finished, EMG-81(B) EMG-60(N) pickups, 22 frets, launched 2012.

- ESP Stephen Carpenter Series
  - ESP Stef Carpenter
  - ESP Stef-B7
  - ESP Stef-B8
  - ESP LTD SC-607
  - ESP LTD SC-607B
  - ESP LTD SC-608B
  - ESP LTD SC-600
  - ESP LTD SC-200
- ESP RZK-1 - A guitar specially for Richard Kruspe, lead guitarist of Rammstein. It has a platinum silver painting and the Rammstein logo on it.
- ESP Eclipse - features neck-thru construction in a 24.75" scale. The fingerboard features flag inlays with ESP at the 12th fret. It has 22 extra jumbo frets and a graphite nut. It comes in black and black cherry with black hardware. The binding is natural on the body and white on the neck and headstock. The tuning pegs are Sperzel locking tuners.
- ESP Horizon - features one volume and one tone control knob with a 3-way toggle, high-end pickups, and other high-end features. The Horizon features neck-thru construction in a 25.5" scale. The fingerboard features pearl offset block inlays with ESP at the 12th fret. It has 24 extra jumbo frets. It comes in see-through aqua and amber sunburst with black hardware. The binding is natural on the body and white on the neck and headstock. The tuning pegs are Sperzel locking tuners.
- ESP Horizon 3 Custom - features neck-thru construction in a 25.5" scale. The fingerboard features dot inlays with ESP at the 12th fret. It has 24 extra jumbo frets. It comes in see-through aqua and amber sunburst with black hardware and white binding on the neck and headstock. The tuning pegs are Sperzel locking tuners. It was discontinued after 2004. It varied from that Horizon in that it was more rounded, with a longer upper claw.
- ESP Michael Paget Signature Series - the successor to the Dave Mustaine/DV series. Its feature new pickups, an EMG-81 in the bridge, and an EMG-85 in the neck. Unlike its predecessor, it no longer has a pickguard.
- ESP VIPER - features one volume and one tone control knob with a 3-way toggle, high-end pickups, and other high-end features. The VIPER features neck-thru construction in a 24.75" scale. The fingerboard features flag inlays with ESP at the 12th fret. It has 24 extra jumbo frets and a graphite nut. It comes in black and black cherry with black hardware and white binding on the neck and headstock. The tuning pegs are Sperzel locking tuners.

== LTD Standard Series ==
- ESP LTD V-50
- ESP LTD V-100
- ESP LTD V-300
- ESP LTD V-401DX
- ESP LTD AX-360
- ESP LTD AX-50
- ESP LTD AX-2E
- ESP LTD B-204SM 4 string
- ESP LTD B-204SMFL 4 string fretless
- ESP LTD BW-1
- ESP LTD EC-500
- ESP LTD EC-401
- ESP LTD EC-401 B
- ESP LTD EC-401 FM
- ESP LTD EC-401 VF
- ESP LTD EC-256 AHB
- ESP LTD EC-256 AVG
- ESP LTD EC-200 QM
- ESP LTD EC-100 QM
- ESP LTD EC-50
- ESP LTD EC-10
- ESP LTD EX-401DX
- ESP LTD EX-360
- ESP LTD EX-50
- ESP LTD F-10
- ESP LTD F-50
- ESP LTD F-100FM
- ESP LTD F-200
- ESP LTD F-200B
- ESP LTD F-2005
- ESP LTD F-207
- ESP LTD F-350
- ESP LTD F-400FM
- ESP LTD F-2E
- ESP LTD FX-260SM
- ESP LTD FX-360
- ESP LTD FX-360SM
- ESP LTD FX-401
- ESP LTD FX-401SM
- ESP LTD H-351R
- ESP LTD H-351NT
- ESP LTD H-101FM
- ESP LTD H-51
- ESP LTD M-300FM
- ESP LTD M-200FM
- ESP LTD M-302FM
- ESP LTD M-103FM
- ESP LTD M-100FM
- ESP LTD M-155
- ESP LTD M-10
- ESP LTD M-53
- ESP LTD M-50
- ESP LTD M-250
- ESP LTD MH-250
- ESP LTD MH-350FR
- ESP LTD MH-327 27 FRET
- ESP LTD MH-103QM
- ESP LTD MH-100QM
- ESP LTD MH-53
- ESP LTD MH-50
- ESP LTD MH-417
- ESP LTD MH-350NT
- ESP LTD MH-100QMNT
- ESP LTD MH-50NT
- ESP LTD PB-401
- ESP LTD PB-500
- ESP LTD ST-203
- ESP LTD ST-203FR
- ESP LTD VIPER-417
- ESP LTD VIPER-300FM
- ESP LTD VIPER-300M
- ESP LTD VIPER-256
- ESP LTD VIPER-100FM
- ESP LTD VIPER-50
- ESP LTD VIPER-10

== ESP Grass Roots Series ==
The ESP Grass Roots brand is solely for the Japanese market. Grass Roots guitars are aimed at the low cost market. Like the other Japan-only line of ESP, Edwards, there are online dealerships for such guitars. When production first started in the early 1990s, Grassroots Guitars were produced in Japan, but they are now produced in Korea.

- Grass Roots G-LS-53
- Grass Roots G-LP-45S/QM
- Grass Roots G-SG-44L
- Grass Roots G-FR-52G
- Grass Roots G-HR-43QM
- Grass Roots G-SE-45SC/R
- Grass Roots G-SE-38R
- Grass Roots G-SE-38M
- Grass Roots G-LP-45S
- Grass Roots G-LP-45C
- Grass Roots G-FR-58GT
- Grass Roots G-SE-39R/H
- Grass Roots G-HR-49S
- Grass Roots G-HR-49QM
- Grass Roots G-MA-49S
- Grass Roots G-7-53HR
- Grass Roots G-7-56MR
- Grass Roots G-FR-48B
- Grass Roots G-JB-44R
- Grass Roots G-PB-45PM
- Grass Roots G-JB-45PM
- Grass Roots G-LB-48CC
- Grass Roots G-PB-42R
- Grass Roots G-UT-43B
- Grass Roots G-VP-43B
- Grass Roots G-FR-58B
- Grass Roots G-PB-45PM Limited Edition
- Grass Roots G-MX-48

== ESP Navigator Series ==
(Japanese-market only guitars)

- Navigator N-LP-580LTD
- Navigator N-LP-380LTD
- Navigator N-LP-350LTD
- Navigator N-LP-400CTM
- Navigator N-LP-380CTM
- Navigator N-SG-320LTD
- Navigator N-FV-300LTD
- Navigator N-EX-300LTD
- Navigator N-ST-300/R
- Navigator N-ST-300/M
- Navigator N-TE-300LTD
- Navigator N-TE-300CTM
- Navigator N-JB-280LTD
- Navigator N-JB-300LTD
- Navigator N-PB-280LTD

Noted musicians and users of ESP Navigator guitars are: Sugizo (Japan), Ramon Goose (UK), Ken Yokoyama (Japan) also Mick Taylor used Arlen Roths Navigator N-LP for the hotlicks video.

== ESP Edwards Series ==
Edwards guitar series consist of very high quality copies of legendary guitars like the Les Paul, Telecaster, and Stratocaster, and also original ESP designs. The Edwards Les Paul, Tele, and Strat guitars are built specifically for the Japanese market, and are not sold in the US as they contravene Gibson and Fender patents; they can however be imported by individual buyers. Many prominent Japanese artists have Edwards series signature models along with a few International artists, such as Alexi Laiho of Children of Bodom, Anchang of Sex Machineguns, and Aiji of LM.C.

- ESP Edwards Thru-neck Series
  - Edwards E-CY-165CTM
  - Edwards E-CY-130D
  - Edwards E-HR-135QM
  - Edwards E-HR-130
  - Edwards E-HR-135
  - Edwards E-FR-130GT
  - Edwards E-FR-145GT/QM
  - Edwards E-RV-148
  - Edwards E-BT-110B
  - Edwards E-FR-110B
- ESP Edwards Original Series
  - E-EX-92D
  - E-EX-110D
  - E-EC-150E
  - E-FV-85D
  - E-LP-112CE
  - E-LP-85SD(Discontinued)
  - E-LP-85CD(Discontinued)
  - E-LP-92SD/QM
  - E-LP-92SD<
  - E-LP-92CD
  - E-LP-92SD/P
  - E-LP-92CD/P
  - E-PO-96D
  - E-PO-108P
  - E-PO-128FR
  - E-PA-125D
  - E-SN-145FR
  - E-SN-150FR
  - E-AM-120M
  - E-AM-120R
  - E-AM-128QM
  - E-AM-138QM
  - E-FV-103B
- ESP Edwards Lacquer Taste Series
  - Edwards E-LP-130LTS/RE
  - Edwards E-LP-98LTS
  - Edwards E-LP-98LTC
  - Edwards E-LS-90LT
  - Edwards E-ML-85LT
  - Edwards E-MM-85LT
  - Edwards E-SA-118LTS
  - Edwards E-SA-130LTC
  - Edwards E-SE-93M/LT
  - Edwards E-SE-93R/LT
  - Edwards E-SG-90LT2
  - Edwards E-SG-110LT2/VT
  - Edwards E-TE-92M/LT
  - Edwards E-TE-92CTM/LT
  - Edwards E-JB-93R/LT
  - Edwards E-PB-83M/LT
  - Edwards E-PB-83R/LT
- ESP Edwards Mini Guitar Series
  - Edwards E-LP-45S/M
  - Edwards E-LP-43C/M
- Artist Models
  - E-7-90HR
  - E-7-90JG
  - E-CY-108D7
  - E-AL-166 Blacky
  - E-C-98V
  - E-CY-115D
  - E-CY-128DT
  - E-CY-130D
  - E-CY-165CTM NAT
  - E-EX-80D
  - E-EX-85LT
  - E-EX-100STD
  - E-EX-125E
  - E-EX-138E
  - E-FR-120B N, SR, SB
  - E-FR-120GT N
  - E-FR-130GT MBK
  - E-FR-145GT
  - E-FV-100STD
  - E-FV-103B DMB
  - E-HR-115D
  - E-HR-120D
  - E-HR-125E
  - E-HR-135FM
  - E-HR-145QM
  - E-JR-85LT
  - E-LP-50S/M
  - E-LP-50C/M
  - E-LP-85SD TSB, BLUE
  - E-LP-85CD Orange
  - E-LP-90LT EVOLUTION Z
  - E-LP-90LTC EVOLUTION Z
  - E-LP-90SD
  - E-LP-90SD/SH
  - E-LP-100LTC
  - E-LP-105CE WHT, BK
  - E-LP-110CTM VHB
  - E-LP-112CE DPS
  - E-LP-117CTM
  - E-LS-90LT BK
  - E-ML-90LT
  - E-PV-143
  - E-RA-110HR
  - E-RV-148
  - E-SA-135LT
  - E-SA-138LTC VW
  - E-SE-93M/LT SOB, TR,3TS
  - E-SE-93R/LT TR, SG
  - E-SG-80D
  - E-SG-90LT2 WN
  - E-US-85D
  - E-SG3-95LTC
  - E-VP-90D
  - E-VP-105D/SL
  - E-VP-98G
  - E-BT-110B
  - E-FR-140B
  - E-JB-110PM
  - E-JB-110JM
  - E-LB-135SD
  - E-LB-135CD
  - E-UT-90B
  - E-UT-93B

== ESP Signature Series ==
- ESP Michael Amott
- ESP Tom Araya
- ESP Stephen Carpenter
- ESP Max Cavalera
- ESP Gabe Crisp
- ESP Gus G
- ESP Page Hamilton
- ESP Kirk Hammett
- ESP Jeff Hanneman
- ESP James Hetfield
- ESP Mark Helymun
- ESP Dan Jacobs
- ESP Dan Kenny
- ESP Alexi Laiho
- ESP Jake E. Lee
- ESP Ahrue Luster
- ESP George Lynch
- ESP Travis Miguel
- ESP Reba Meyers
- ESP Dave Mustaine
- ESP Jardel Paisante
- ESP Wayne Static
- ESP Jesper Stromblad
- ESP Akira Takasaki
- ESP Ronni Le Tekrø
- ESP Metin Türkcan
- ESP Emppu Vuorinen
- ESP Michael Wilton
- ESP Ron Wood
- ESP Richard Z
- ESP Jeff Ling

== Comparison chart ==
Model	Period	Construction		Woods			Hardware		Colors
Model	Period	Body	Neck	Body	Neck	Fretboard	Bridge	Pickup	Colors
Alexi Laiho Arrow Head	2005/07	Solid	Neck-thru	Alder	Maple	Ebony with Arrow Head Inlays	Floyd Rose Original	EMG HZ H-4	White, black
Alexi Laiho Saw Tooth	2005/07	Solid	Neck-thru	Alder	Maple	Ebony with Sawtooth Inlays	Floyd Rose Original	EMG HZ H-4	Black
Alexi Laiho Signature Model	2005/07	Solid	Neck-thru	Alder	Maple	Ebony with Sawtooth Inlays	Floyd Rose Original	EMG HZ H-4	White, black
Alexi Laiho Scythe	2005/07	Solid	Neck-thru	Alder	Maple	Ebony with Scythe Inlays	Floyd Rose Original	EMG HZ H-4	White
AX-50			Bolt-on	Basswood	Maple	Rosewood	Tune-O-Matic	2 ESP LH-150	Silver, black
AX-260			Neck-thru	Agathis	Mahogany	Rosewood	Tune-O-Matic	2 EMG-ESP LH-300	Black
AX-400			Set-in	Mahogany	Mahogany	Rosewood	Tune-O-Matic	2 EMG 81 active pickups	See-through black, see-through red
Dan Jacobs EX (ESP LTD DJ-600)		Solid	Set-thru	Mahogany	Maple	Rosewood	Floyd Rose Original Bridge	EMG 81 & EMG 85	White with blood graphics
Eclipse (Custom series)			Neck-thru	Mahogany	Maple	Maple	TonePros Locking Bridge with Stop Tailpiece	EMG 81 & EMG 60	Black, black cherry
EX-50		Solid	Bolt-on	Basswood	Maple	Rosewood	Tune-O-Matic	2 ESP LH-100	Titanium, black
Kirk Hammett KH-2		Solid	Bolt-on	Alder	Maple	Rosewood	Floyd Rose Original Bridge	EMG 81 & EMG 60	Black
Kirk Hammett KH-2 Vintage		Solid	Neck-thru	Alder	Maple	Rosewood	Floyd Rose Original Bridge	EMG 81 & EMG 60	Black
Horizon 3 Custom			Neck-thru	Mahogany	Maple	Ebony	TonePros Locking Bridge with Stop Tailpiece	Seymour Duncan JB & Seymour Duncan 59	See-through aqua, amber sunburst, transparent green
Horizon (Custom series)			Neck-thru	Mahogany	Maple	Ebony	TonePros Locking Bridge with Stop Tailpiece	Seymour Duncan JB & Seymour Duncan 59	See-through aqua, amber sunburst
LTD EC-1000			Set-in	Mahogany	Mahogany	Rosewood	TonePros Locking Bridge with Stop Tailpiece	Seymour Duncan JB & Seymour Duncan 59 or EMG 81 & EMG 60	Amber sunburst, black, black cherry, white
LTD EC-1000VB			Set-in	Mahogany	Maple	Ebony	TonePros Locking Bridge with Stop Tailpiece	EMG 81 & EMG 60	Vintage black, headstock
LTD EC-1000VHB			Set-in	Mahogany	Mahogany	Rosewood	TonePros Locking Bridge with Stop Tailpiece	Seymour Duncan JB & Seymour Duncan 59	Honey burst
ESP LTD H-1000			Set-thru	Mahogany	Maple	Rosewood	TonePros Locking Bridge with string-thru body	Seymour Duncan JB & Seymour Duncan 59 or EMG 81 & EMG 85	Amber cherry sunburst, black, white
ESP LTD M-1000			Neck-thru	Alder	Maple	Rosewood	Floyd Rose Original Bridge	2 EMG 81	See-through black, white
ESP LTD MH-1000			Set-thru	Mahogany	Maple	Rosewood	TonePros Locking Bridge with string-thru body or Floyd Rose Original Tremolo	Seymour Duncan JB & Seymour Duncan 59 or EMG 81 & EMG 85	Black, dark brown sunburst
LTD VIPER-1000			Set-in	Mahogany	Mahogany	Rosewood	TonePros Locking Bridge with Stop Tailpiece	Seymour Duncan Custom 5 & Seymour Duncan Jazz or EMG 81 & EMG 85	Black, black cherry, vintage sunburst, white
VIPER (Custom series)			Neck-thru	Mahogany	Maple	Ebony	TonePros Locking Bridge with Stop Tailpiece	EMG 81 & EMG 85	Black, black cherry

== See also ==
- ESP Lakland
