= Set-through neck =

Set-through neck (or Set-thru neck) is a method of joining the neck and the body of guitar (or similar stringed instrument), effectively combining bolt-on, set-in and neck-through methods. It involves:

- A pocket in the instrument's body for insertion of neck, as in bolt-on method. However, the pocket is much deeper than usual one.
- Long neck plank, comparable to the scale length, as in the neck-through method.
- Glueing (setting) the long neck inside the deep pocket, as in the set-neck method.

The result is usually told to have combined advantages of all these methods, mostly eliminating their disadvantages. Luthiers frequently cite:

- improved tone and sustain (due to deep insertion and body made of single piece of wood, not laminated as in neck-through),
- brighter tone (due to set joint)
- comfortable access to top frets (due to lack of hard heel and bolt plate),
- better wood stability.

The main disadvantage is relatively complex construction that leads to higher manufacturing and servicing costs. Another cited disadvantage is the inability or relative complexity of adding a double-locking tremolo to the guitar, as the routing for cavities would interfere with deeply set neck.

== Manufacturers ==
Set-through necks are relatively uncommon, and few manufacturers produce such neck joints. Sometimes, especially if neck extension inside a body does not fill full scale length, such neck joint is marketed as an extended pocket set-in neck or deep-set neck.

David Thomas McNaught claims to be the first who proposed a modern version of set-through neck joint. "Set-Thru" is a registered trademark of McNaught Guitars in United States since February 25, 2003.

Despite the trademark, some other companies use the term to describe their products, including Dean Guitars, ESP Guitars, Solar Guitars, and B.C. Rich.

As opposed to popular neck-through designs that emphasize the neck as one piece of wood and the body wings as (laminated) separate pieces by using transparent or semi-transparent finishes and contrasting woods, there's no such trend for set-through guitars. Usually, it's hard to determine if the guitar has set-through neck or neck-through body judging only the general outlook. B.C. Rich's Invisibolt Technology is one notable exception that uses black ("shadow") body and contrasting light neck wood. A second example would be Toone Guitars' deliberate emphasis of the neck joint as an aesthetic choice, in particular the exposed asymmetrical sliding dovetail joint.
