= Star (guitar) =

Electric guitar shape

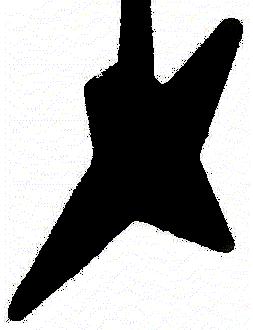
Charvel Star profile

The star is a body shape of solid body electric guitar, particularly favoured for heavy metal music. It blends some features of the Gibson Flying V and Gibson Explorer, both of them much older designs.

Eddie Van Halen hacked his explorer-shaped Ibanez Destroyer to make it look like a shark around 1977, so he is credited as the inventor of the star-shaped guitar.

Wayne Charvel refined the design and those Charvel Stars 79-83 are among the most valued instruments of the brand. The earlier had strat headstocks, later on replaced with the Jackson pointy headstock.

== Models ==
=== Jackson ===
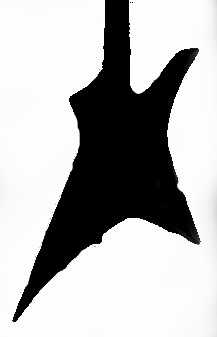
Jackson Kelly Star profile

The earliest known star bodies were built by Jackson Guitars, who produced both through-neck custom models and commercial versions with bolt-on necks.

More recently, Jackson have produced the Jackson Kelly Star KSXT/KS-2 with a similar body shape to the Star, combining the "front" half of a Jackson Kelly with the asymmetric pointed 'V' ends of the Jackson Randy Rhoads. This body shape was only in production for a short time in the early 2000s, with its market niche now being served by the Jackson Warrior, which is less distinctly "star"-shaped at first glance but has a similar general structure. Jackson now makes a "Gus G." signature star in 3 levels, the JS32 bolt on import, the X series neck thru import, and a US made neck thru model.

=== Other major makers ===
A star body produced by Kramer Guitars was known as the Voyager. Kramer also produced another star body guitar model for the Japanese market only: The Kramer JK8000.

Charvel Guitars have also produced some model of star profile, for example the star model of the Charvel Desolation series.

The Dean ML is a similar design to the star, but differs in having symmetrical tail horns (or wings as they are known in Flying V and similar designs). The Washburn Guitars Dime (or Dimebag, after Dimebag Darrell who popularised the Dean design) uses the Dean ML profile.

ESP guitars have the RS series guitar, similar to the star but with a different headstock. It is made by their Edwards guitars subdivision and is only sold in Japan. ESP also produces Gus G and Roope Latvala signature models which have a star shape.

Ibanez built star-shaped models in the mid-1980s in its DT and DG series. As with most other "star" guitars, the body was a variant of the "Explorer" shape (called "Destroyer" by Ibanez) that had a roughly triangular section of its rear end cut out. Since 2008, Ibanez has produced the Xiphos, an x-shape guitar similar to the Jackson Warrior but with reversed cut edges. The first prototype was built for Muhammed Suiçmez of Necrophagist as a signature model; the Xiphos was reintroduced in 2021 as a part of the revival of the Iron Label series.

=== Custom designs ===
The original Jackson star shape remains popular with home constructors and commercial custom-builders.

=== Rosa Hurricane ===
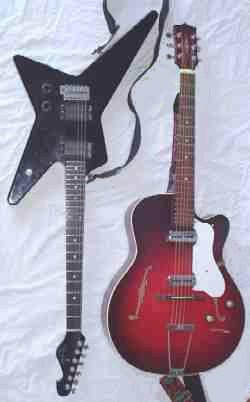
Rosa Hurricane guitar (at left)

The guitar at left in the image at right is a Rosa Hurricane of star design, date and country of manufacture unknown. Two high-output humbuckers, conventional three-position pickup change switch, single passive volume and tone controls. This is because the guitar was built to be played loud to extremely loud and dirty, with most of the tone shaping being done by guitar effects or the guitar amplifier itself.

Scale length is just over 25½" (the longest common scale length for electric guitars) but the body of this example was routed for about 26½", a serious defect which rendered the guitar untunable. Originally equipped with a Stratocaster style tremolo arm, this particular instrument has been converted to hard-tail ("blocked"), which has solved the tuning problem and also improved tuning stability and provided even more sustain.

Rosa was a house brand of Australian importer Rose Music. This model was intended as an entry level electric guitar.

== Similar body shapes ==
The name star has been given to several other guitar shapes unrelated to the Jackson body shape.

Glitter Band Star profile

One example was the guitars played by Gerry Shephard from 1972 in The Glitter Band, the backing band of Gary Glitter. These had bodies in the shape of a regular five-pointed star, in keeping with the glam rock genre of the band. The first, gold in colour, was made by Chris Eccleshall. It was destroyed in a baggage handling accident; the second, silver in colour, was built by John Birch to replace the first.

Steve Carr built a star guitar for Paul Stanley of Kiss around 1980, basically looking like the Glitter Band's body turned 180 degrees, featuring a sparkly body. It can be seen in the German "Talk To Me/She's So European" TV-performance.

A copy of the John Birch star guitar, also silver in colour and produced by First Act, has more recently been played by Martin Gore, touring with Depeche Mode.

BC Rich have their own 'star' shapes. The Ironbird is a much more pointy version of the Star; it holds similar features to a Dean Razorback. The Stealth is another.

ESP Guitars have several star guitars, the Roope Latvala and Gus G signature models in North America, and the Akira Takasaki Random Star, Syu Crying Star, Anchang signature, and George Lynch Kamikaze Star in Japan.

== See also ==
=== Other radical guitar profiles ===
- Gibson Explorer.
- Gibson Flying V.
- Dean ML.
- Jackson Randy Rhoads.
- Jackson Kelly.
- Jackson King V.
- Burns Flyte.
- BC Rich Ironbird.
- ESP Gus G Signature Guitar.
- ESP Roope Latvala Signature Guitar.
- Kramer Voyager.
- Charvel Star.
