= ESP LTD SC-600 =

- Manufacturer: ESP
- Period: unknown

Construction
- Body type: Solid
- Neck joint: Neck-thru

Woods
- Body: Maple
- Neck: 3-piece Maple
- Fretboard: Rosewood

Hardware
- Bridge: TonePros Locking Bridge with String-Thru Body
- Pickup(s): Seymour Duncan JB (Bridge)/Duncan Designed HB-102 (Middle)

Colors available
- Three-Tone Burst, Natural Gloss

ESP LTD SC-600 is a guitar model distributed by ESP.

The ESP LTD SC-600 is a 6-string guitar, constructed using Maple neck-thru design and Mahogany body, 24-fret rosewood fingerboard and reverse headstock. It features Seymour Duncan SH-4 pickups at the bridge and Duncan Designed HB-102N at the neck. Single volume and tone-control knobs, in addition to a 3-way toggle pickup switch. Mother-of-pearl SRC inlay at the 12th fret, also standard. It was available in both natural finish and sunburst, but has since been discontinued.

== See also ==
- ESP Stephen Carpenter
