= Washburn N4 =

1990 electric guitar by Washburn

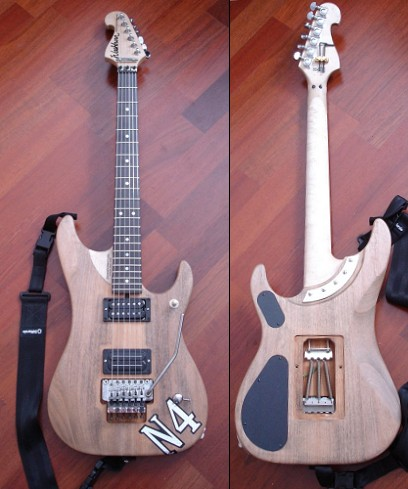
- Washburn N4 vintage
- Manufacturer: Washburn
- Period: 1990–2025

Construction
- Body type: Solid
- Neck joint: Stephen's Extended Cutaway (enhanced bolt-on)
- Scale: 25.5"

Woods
- Body: Alder, Padauk, Swamp Ash (common); Korina, Mahogany, Maple (limited series)
- Neck: Maple (most), Padauk (rare)
- Fretboard: Ebony (most), Padauk (rare)

Hardware
- Bridge: Kahler (early), Floyd Rose Licensed or Original (most)
- Pickup(s): Seymour Duncan SH1N (neck); Bill Lawrence USA L500-XL (bridge)

Colors available
- Natural oil finish

The Washburn N4 is an electric guitar model, developed in collaboration between Nuno Bettencourt, Washburn and the Seattle-based luthier Stephen Davies. Since its introduction in mid-late 1990, it became Bettencourt's primary guitar and it is marketed by Washburn as his signature model. The N4 is the flagship of the Washburn N-prefix guitar models.

(N8 being an "N4 times 2" since it is a double neck guitar).

The N4 features a distinctive superstrat form-factor, two humbucking pickups, floating tremolo system and the Stephens Extended Cutaway enhanced bolt-on neck joint, a patented design that allows easier player access to higher frets.

Since 1990, there have been numerous versions of the N4 using various woods and hardware parts.

== Features ==
=== Body ===
Models have appeared using alder, padauk (padauk, padouk) and swamp ash. Korina, mahogany, sapele, and maple woods also have been used for some limited series.

While all regular N4s have an oil finish, a few limited-edition models have featured lacquered bodies.

=== Neck ===
Generally, the N4 has a maple neck (the N4 Vintage having birdseye maple), excepting padauk models (padauk necks) and sapele models (sapele necks).

The neck has 22 jumbo frets and dot inlays, with the exception of the N4E-MNM Mourning Widows model and the XX model, which have Mourning Widows logo-shaped inlays. That logo reproduces a tattoo Bettencourt has on his left arm.

=== Fingerboard ===
Mourning Widows (Logo based on the letters M and W) inlays of the N4E-MNM

With the exception of the very rare all-padauk models (which have a padauk fingerboard), all N4s have ebony fingerboards. Recent special editions, as well as the derived N5/N6 models have maple fingerboards. Some other derivative such as the N2, N3 and N24 have rosewood boards to reduce costs. Composite fingerboards have been used on prototypes.

=== Neck Joint ===
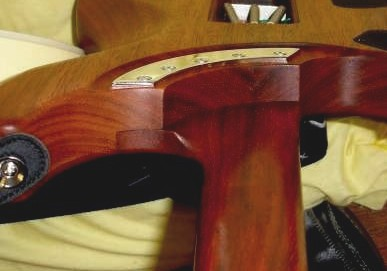
Close view of the Stephens Extended Cutaway

The N4 neck is a bolt-on type using an unusual mounting system, the Stephen's Extended Cutaway, invented by Seattle luthier Stephen Davies and licensed by Washburn. It features a five-bolt curved joint, intended to give the player greater access to upper frets while maintaining proper and comfortable hand position, due to its 'heel-less' design.

=== Pickups ===
The standard N4 bears a Seymour Duncan SH1n (nicknamed the "'59 Model") at the neck position and a Bill Lawrence L500 at the bridge.

Some confusion arises as Washburn has in the past installed pickups from both Bill Lawrence (doing business as Wilde Pickups) and Bill Lawrence USA (owned by Jzchak Wajcman). Bill Lawrence left the company Bill Lawrence USA in 1984.

Bettencourt has stated that he uses an L500 pickup. Actually, his primary N4 (alder) bears an L500XL Bill Lawrence USA pickup—made before Bill Lawrence left the company—rather than the more recent L500. Although similar in appearance, there is controversy among fans over which pickup is genuine in sound to the original pickups Bettencourt used.

A "Bill Lawrence USA" logo may appear on the bridge pickup. Else, if the spaces of the pickup's chrome case have been filled with epoxy resin, it is a Bill Lawrence USA L500 rather than Wilde (which doesn't employ epoxy potting in their design).

The first 20 N4s made in 1990 actually came with a Seymour Duncan JB in the neck and a Bill Lawrence L500 in the bridge.

=== Controls ===
All N4s have a 3-way pickup selector located on the lower horn as well as a single volume pot. Few models also feature a tone control (i.e. the Washburn sunburst as well as the Mourning Widows model).

=== Tremolo ===
While the very first N4 design had a Kahler tremolo, standard Washburn N4s feature a Washburn tremolo made by Schaller in Germany. Vintage and Relic models as well as the "2.0 models" do have the Original Floyd Rose tremolo unit as used by Bettencourt himself.

=== Buzz Feiten Tuning System ===
The Washburns N4 is intonated using the Buzz Feiten system at point of manufacture.

== Series Rundown ==
- N1: Fender-style non-locking tremolo, Washburn-branded pickups, standard four-bolt neck plate
- N2: L500 Bill Lawrence bridge pickup, Washburn-branded neck pickup, standard 4 bolt neck, rosewood fretboard
- N3: direct-mounted Washburn-branded pickups, Stephen's Extended Cutaway—Bettencourt has owned an N3 with 24 frets and Bill Lawrence pickups, but that was a one-off, never offered commercially
- N4: "standard" model
- N5: three single-coil pickups, Stephen's Extended Cutaway, five-way blade switch, Volume and Tone controls, maple fretboard
- N6: similar to the N5, with L500 Bill Lawrence bridge humbucker
- N7: similar to the N4, seven-string variant with a Duncan SH-6 "Distortion" bridge pickup
- N8: double-neck version of the N4
- N24: N3 reissue
- N27: an N7 with Washburn-branded pickups and a standard neck plate

== Model names ==
The N4 model number using a letter suffix to indicate the woods used. The first letter indicates the fingerboard wood (most usually E for ebony). Remaining letters represent body wood and finish.

Examples:

- N4E-SA: ebony fingerboard, swamp ash body.
- N4P-PNM: padauk fingerboard, padauk body, Natural Matte.
- N4E-MNM: ebony fingerboard, mahogany body, Natural Matte.

== Serial numbers ==
The first 20 N4s that were made in 1990 started with serial number 901-920. Nuno bought 901 from a fan in late 2021 which was covered and documented by Guitar World. The serial number was stamped on the back of the headstock and inside the tremolo cavity.

N4s all have a serial number on the back of the headstock using the following form:

- 2 digits for the year
- 2 digits for the month
- at least 3 digits for the actual serial number.

For instance, a 9512nnn would be the nnnth N4 produced in December 1995.

Very early N4s have a different serial number system: 3 or 4 digits for the guitar's number followed by the production year's last two digits.

== Evolution ==
=== Early models-Davies/La Jolla N4s ===
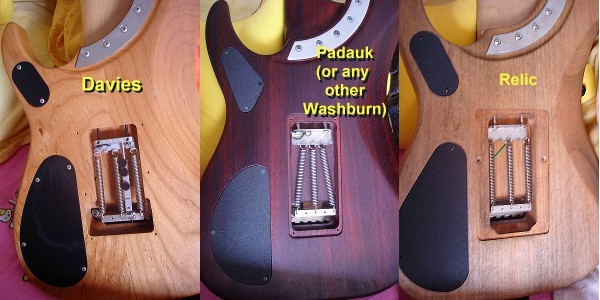
Differences on the back cavities

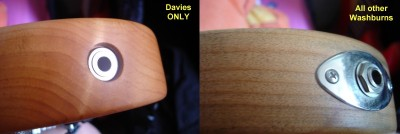
Differences on the output jack

The first run of 20 N4s were built as a limited run in 1990 starting with serial number 901-920 by Stephen Davies. These 20 guitars were much like the later 1991 model Davies except they came with a Seymour Duncan JB in the neck instead of a Seymour Duncan 59. They did not come with a case because Washburn had not produced a molded N4 case until 1991.

All early models were made of Alder, using a Maple neck and an Ebony fingerboard.

Early N4s have a Kahler tremolo, a distinctively large control cavity rout, a rounded-rectangle shaped pickup selector cavity, a sloped Stephen's Extended Cutaway front side, a barrel jack, and a thinner neck.

Washburn models have the Washburn/Schaller tremolo unit, smaller volume-control cavity, a rounded-triangle pickup selector cavity, a 90-degrees 'Stephen's Extended Cutaway' front side, a standard 1/4" jack, and a thicker neck.

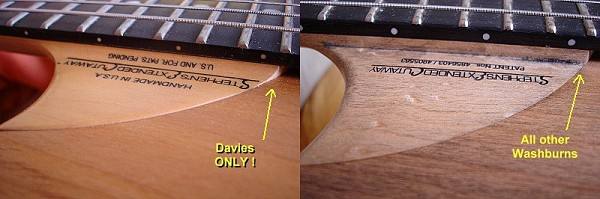

From a recent testimony by Terry Atkins, who was in charge of the early Washburn N4 production, some of these early N4s were not (entirely) made by Stephen Davies : Starting from July '91, some bodies were also produced in La Jolla (California), while necks were produced in a cabinet factory in Chicago. Those parts were then sent to either Washburn or Stephen Davies for assembly. A rough estimation based on the preceding production pace has been made stating that N4s whose serial numbers are over 060091 may not have been entirely made by Stephen Davies.

=== Padauk ===
In early 1993, Washburn released a new version of the N4 made from padauk that was used by Nuno Bettencourt during the tour following Extreme's third album III sides to every story and during the next album (Waiting for the punchline) recording. Padauk is extremely dense and heavy, providing a deeper/darker tone than alder, while still conserving good high end frequencies. These are considered valuable for having gained a reputation for being exceptionally good-sounding.

=== Swamp ash ===
Washburn Guitars also produced a version of the N4 with a body of swamp ash, a wood considered to have an "aggressive" trebly emphasis, granting this N4 a distinctive tone.

After Washburn stopped producing padauk N4, they offered a swamp ash models stained to resemble padauk. These are readily recognized because of the typical swamp ash porous veins showing behind the stain. This models sounds exactly like the (unstained) N4E-SA.

=== Limited editions ===
Since 1990, Washburn produced a few limited editions of the N4.

- Black N4 by Davies : In 1991, six black N4s were constructed by Stephen Davies and his team.
- Korinas (limba wood) : Body made of korina, maple neck, all signed by Nuno Bettencourt and numbered on the back of the headstock.

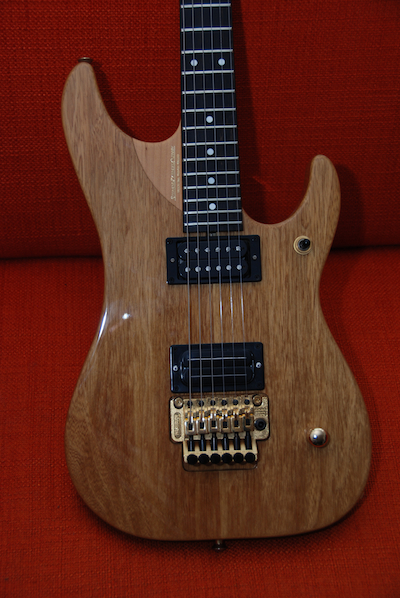

- Mourning Widows: One-piece mahogany body, maple neck, the Mourning Widow logo was used to design the neck inlays.

This model came with two control pots : 1 volume + 1 tone, each of them being a push/pull pot allowing to coil-split each pickup independently. Washburn made 100 of them, all signed by Bettencourt and numbered on the back of the head. Those N4s were reserved for the Japan market.

- various finishes: These fall into two categories. the Washburn ones (which feature various limited-run finishes such as White & Black Stains, solid-colour lacquers, sunbursts & sparkles). These guitars all feature different woods depending on the finish (swamp ash for the stained models, Alder for the solid coloured ones & either alder, maple/mahogany or solid maple for the sunbursts). Then there are the 1992 'Transitional' models, all made of Alder & could be found in various bursts & (to a lesser extent) acid rain finishes. In addition to this, there were also one-of-a-kind iridescent models.
- padauk re-edition models: in the early 2000s, Washburn produced new padauk models. These tend to be lighter in weight than the original-run padauk N4s, and lighter in color (orange to red, as opposed to the red to purple colours of the original run).

Two theories exist for that obvious change in production: quick-grown wood (therefore not giving the time for the wood to age naturally and achieve the full density that padauk would naturally acquire over time) or a change in the wood species (African padauk for the first models, Indian padauk for the later ones). Another reason for the difference in color is the oxidation of the reddish pigments in padouk wood by UV light over time. All padauk darkens with age from a red/orange to a deep purplish brown, and the time between runs likely contributes to the differentiation in color.

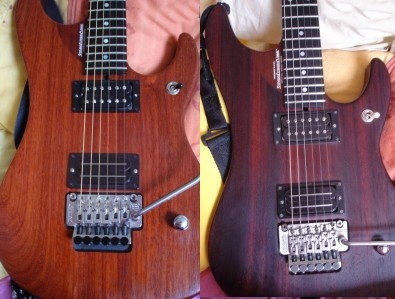

These models don't feature in Washburn's catalogues, as they are produced in limited supply.

- Asian production : While all N4s have been produced in the United States, specific N4s have been produced in Japan for the Japanese market exclusively (also known as Made in Japan "MIJ" N4s).

Even though these models feature all the characteristics of early N4s, they lack any visible serial number and do not have the 'Made in USA' written on the back of the headstock. A red serial number is printed on the hidden part of the Stephen's Extended Cutaway.

Since MIJ N4s are made from an early blueprint, they resemble Nuno's own guitar in many details.

There is also controversy as a number of N4s were made in Asia during the mid-nineties. Washburn tried to pass these guitars off as though they were built in the USA custom shop and therefore do feature the 'Made in the USA' tag line on the cutaway and serial number on the back of the headstock. Washburn consequently faced legal action and closed their Washburn Europe operation as a result of the heavy fines that they were dealt.

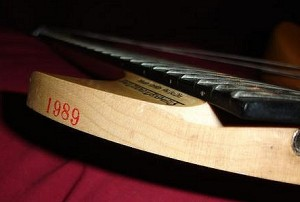

- special N3-like custom production : There has been a special custom run inspired by Nuno's 1990 N3 model.

A very limited run of 20 US-made units based on Nuno's third ever Washburn prototype, which had a maple fretboard and two Bill Lawrence L500 pickups. There was a Korean-produced model called the N3 for a while, but these limited edition N3s are made in the United States. They have 22 frets, unlike Nuno's original which had 24, and feature an original Floyd Rose bridge, a birdseye maple fretboard, the original 1 5/8-inch (41 mm) nut width and the original N4 neck profile. Manufactured in relic and non-relic versions. A Washburn N3 can be seen in the official music video of Extreme's "Decadence Dance".

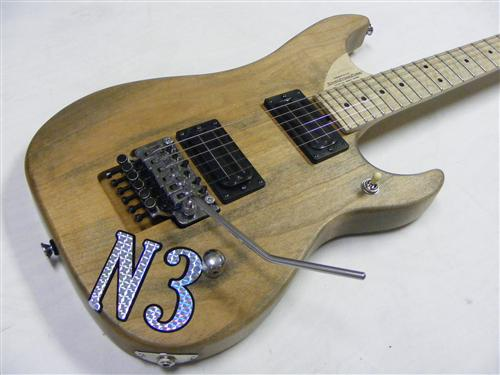

- the 2.0 (Davies-spec) : Mid 2009, Washburn created a new model, using Nuno's main Davies N4 as a model. They moulded Nuno's N4 neck to reproduce its profile exactly. They added a curved Stephen's extended cutaway, and changed the output jack to a barrel one. They also increased the tremolo back routing to give more headspace to the tremolo to be used. These 2.0 specifications will be used on the XX-Anniversary and some other Davies Reissue models.
- the 8 Specials : Built with one-piece padauk bodies, 8 guitars were done as a test run for the 2.0 specification...

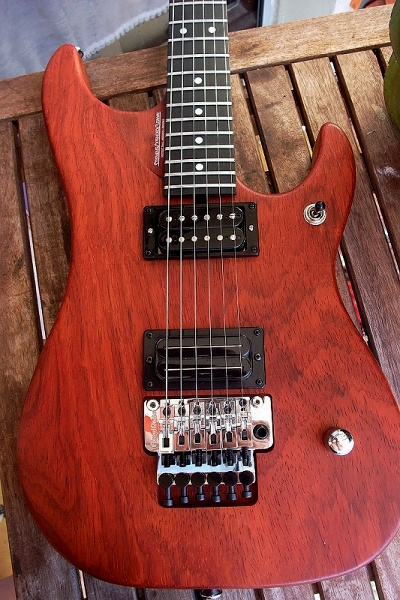
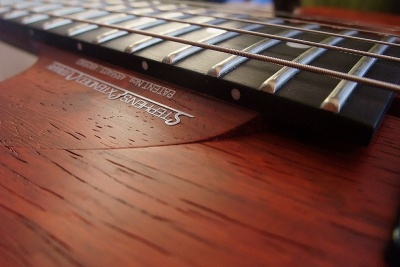

- the XX Anniversary model : This is the deluxe anniversary limited run (100 pieces). Using the 2.0 model specification, with a black limba (Korina) body, a flame Koa top, Mourning Widow inlays, deluxe hard case.

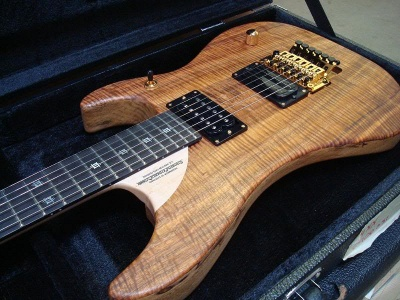

- Various Maple tops on Mahogany bodies: Body made out of Mahogany, with a top layer of Flame Maple or Quilted Maple. Neck made out of Birdseye Maple with either a Birdseye Maple or Ebony fingerboard. These were custom built, sometimes one-of-a kind, mostly in 2009, continued in 2010.

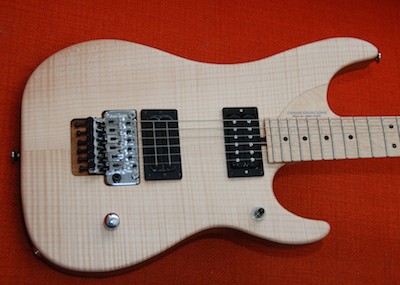

- Sapele: Body and neck both made out of Sapele wood with Ebony fingerboard. There were roughly 15 or so made. Sapele is close to Mahogany in tone. These were produced in 2009.

=== Current editions ===
In 2017, Washburn Guitars offers

- N2: import model, in natural matte or padauk-stain matte finish
- N4EPNM: padauk body
- N4 Authentic: detailed replica of Bettencourt's original N4
- N4 Vintage: birdseye maple neck, alder body
- N24: import model, rosewood fingerboard, agathis body in "vintaged" natural or padauk-stain finish
