= ESP Lakland =

The ESP Lakland brand produces bass guitars made by American bass guitar maker Lakland for the Japanese guitar company ESP. These basses are made solely for the Japanese market.

Products in the brand include:

- ESP Lakland 4 Series Basses
  - Lakland 4-94 Deluxe
  - Lakland 4-94 Standard
  - Lakland 4-94 Classic
- ESP Lakland 55 Series Basses
  - Lakland 55-94 Deluxe
  - Lakland 55-94 Standard
  - Lakland 55-94 Classic
- ESP Lakland Signature Series Basses
  - Lakland Joe Osborn
  - Lakland Bob Glaub
- ESP Lakland Shoreline Series Basses
  - Lakland SL4-94 Deluxe
  - Lakland SL4-94 Standard
  - Lakland SL4-94 Classic
  - Lakland SL55-94 Deluxe
  - Lakland SL55-94 Classic
  - Lakland SL Joe Osborn
  - Lakland SL Darryl Jones
  - Lakland SL Bob Glaub

== See also ==
- ESP Guitars
