= ESP Kamikaze =

ESP Kamikaze 1
- Manufacturer: ESP
- Period: 1986

Construction
- Body type: Solid
- Neck joint: Bolt-On

Woods
- Body: Maple
- Neck: Maple
- Fretboard: Ebony

Hardware
- Bridge: Floyd Rose Original Bridge
- Pickup(s): Seymour Duncan Screamin' Demon (Bridge)/ESP SH-120 single coil

Colors available
- custom Kamikaze design

ESP Kamikaze is a guitar model distributed by ESP.

The Kamikaze was created when George Lynch entered an ESP shop in Tokyo while on tour looking for a replacement neck. He learned that ESP also made custom guitars, so he created the Kamikaze.

The Kamikaze was the first guitar in ESP's Signature Series.

== Different Models ==
Kamikaze I- Original kamikaze model with black/tan/yellow/red color scheme, ebony fretboard, maple body and neck. George Lynch's original did not have a recess cavity for the tremolo system, but it is recessed on the ESP signature Series.

Kamikaze II- Same specs as the Kamikaze I with a blue/red/white color scheme, the Kamikaze II was the first kamikaze model, and therefore the first signature series guitar, that ESP has put on the market. Early examples were available with a Sinclair bridge and without the tremolo unit being back routed.

The Kamikaze II was originally ordered by a guy who worked in a music store in Alexandria, La who wanted a Kamikaze in a different color scheme, but when his guitar arrived at 48th St in New York from Japan, George Lynch happened to be there, saw the guitar and claimed it for himself, so ESP had to make another for the guy in Louisiana.

Kamikaze III- Same as others with a White/black/tan color scheme.

Kamikaze IV- much different from the other models with a fluorescent color scheme, reverse sawtooth headstock (as opposed to a reverse banana). This guitar has the same woods to other Kamikaze models (maple body, maple neck), but has a maple fretboard instead of ebony.
