= Neck (music) =

Musical instrument part

The neck is the part of certain string instruments that projects from the main body and is the base of the fingerboard, where the fingers are placed to stop the strings at different pitches. Guitars, banjos, ukuleles, lutes, the violin family, and the mandolin family are examples of instruments which have necks. Necks are also an integral part of certain woodwind instruments, such as the saxophone.

The word for neck also sometimes appears in other languages in musical instructions. The terms include manche (French), manico (Italian), and Hals (German).

== Guitar ==

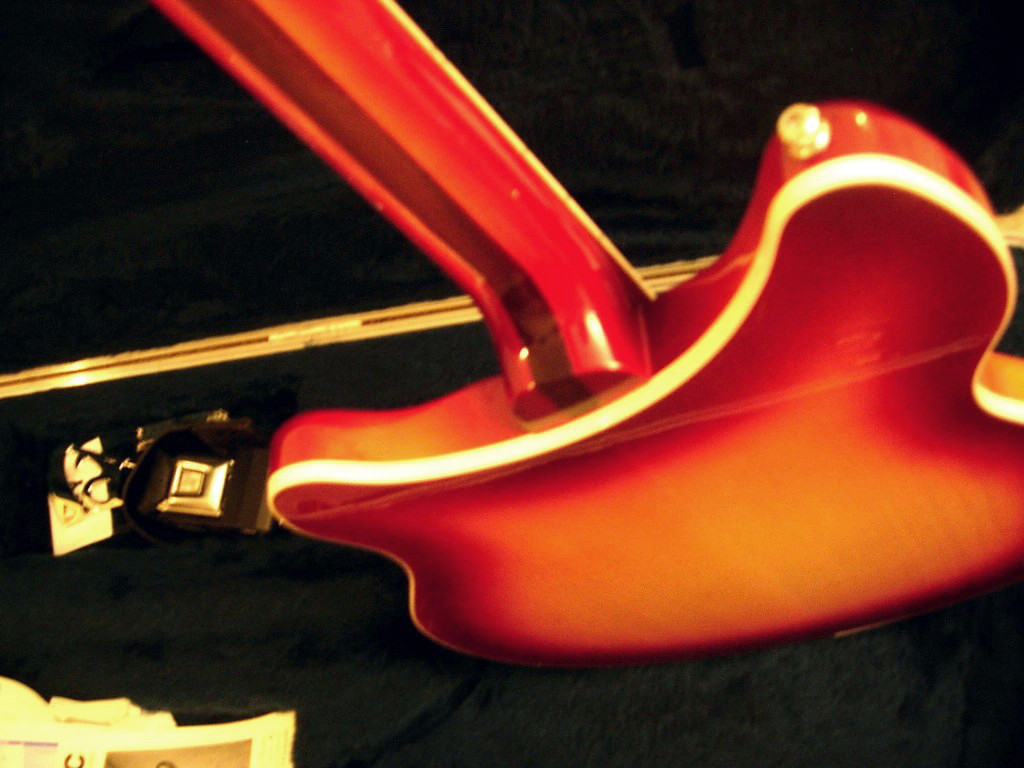
Double truss rod neck, Rickenbacker guitar

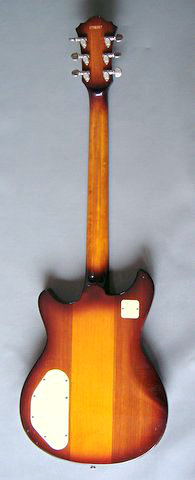
Neck-through construction on Ibanez studio guitar

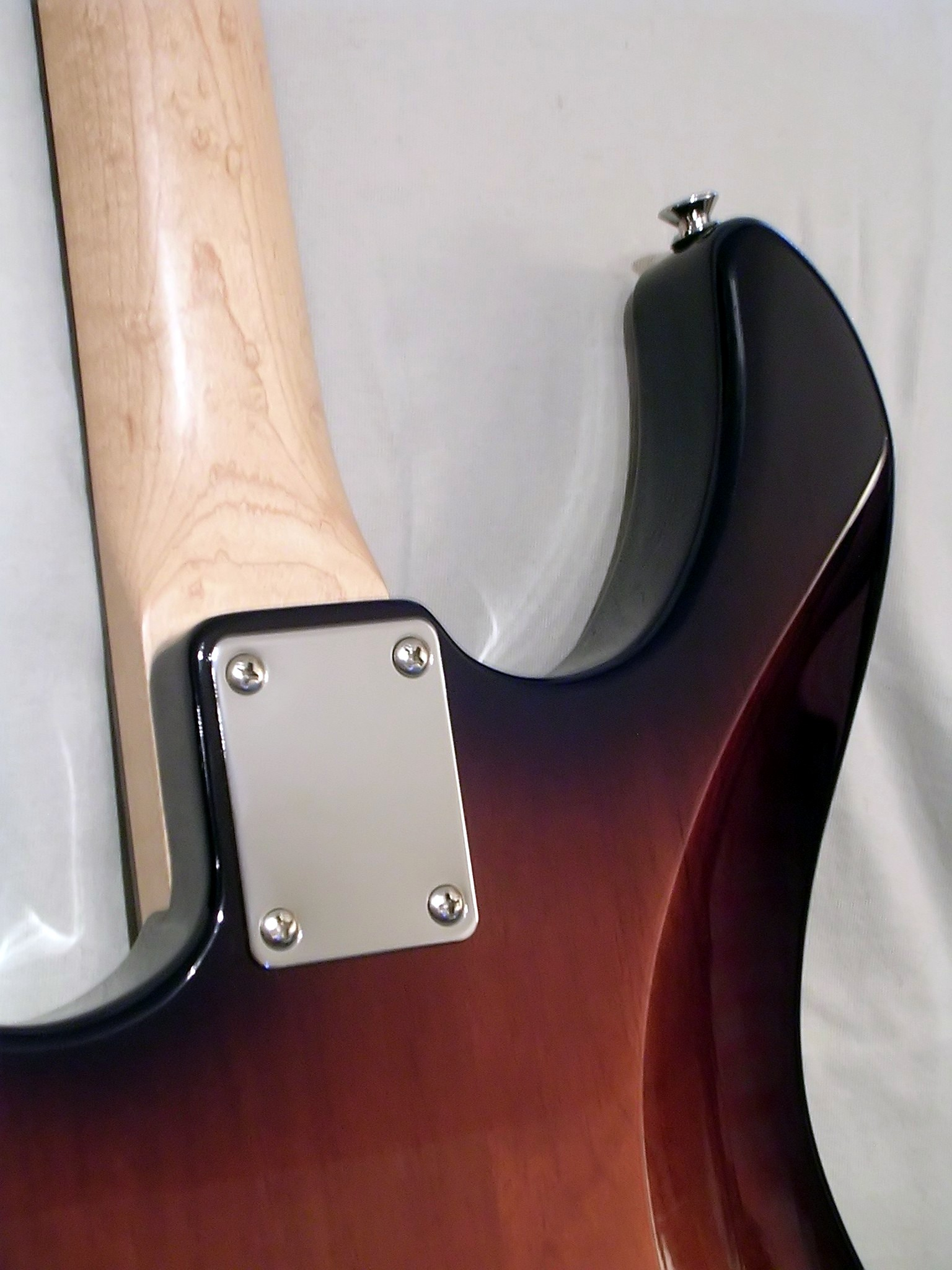
Neck joint with a four-screw plate for the bolt-on neck on a Yamaha Pacifica 112 electric guitar

The neck of a guitar includes the guitar's frets, fretboard, tuners, headstock, and truss rod. The wood used to make the fretboard will usually differ from the wood in the rest of the neck. The bending stress on the neck is considerable, particularly when heavier gauge strings are used, and the ability of the neck to resist bending is important to the guitar's ability to hold a constant pitch during tuning or when strings are fretted. The rigidity of the neck with respect to the body of the guitar is one determinant of an instrument's quality. Conversely, the ability to change the pitch of the note slightly by deliberately bending the neck forcibly with the fretting arm is a technique occasionally used, particularly in the blues genre and those derived from it, such as rock and roll. The shape of the neck's cross-section can also vary from a gentle curve to a more pronounced "V" shape. (On steel string guitars, the fretboard is typically gently rounded across its width. On classical guitars, the playing surface of the fretboard is generally flat.)

Marker dots on the face of the fretboard of modern guitars are usually placed at frets 3, 5, 7, 9, 12 (double dot to indicate the octave), 15, 17, 19, 21, 24 (double dot to indicate the second octave). It's also common that there are marker dots on the "upper" side of the neck, near the edge of the fretboard, where the player can easily see which fret they are on. Sometimes the dots are replaced with bars, the octave positions having a wider bar. Classical guitars almost never feature position markers, especially on the fretboard's face, whereas electric guitars usually do. This is due to several factors:

1) Electric guitars do not rely on a resonating body chamber to produce sound and therefore the inert bodywood may be carved more deeply to allow better access to higher frets.

2) Electric guitars also sport an extended high-end range, due to the above reason. Typically, up to 24 frets are used.

3) Electric guitars vary greatly in terms of scale length, depth of lower and – if present – upper rout and where these connect to the neck at its heel, and number of frets (usually between 21 and 24). In contrast, classical guitar dimensions are standardised, with the 12th fret aligning with the neck-end of the body, use of only 19 frets, and scale length of 25.6".

While it may be perceived that position markers are featured on popular instruments to accommodate their typically lesser-educated users (in contrast to classical instruments), on the contrary, for the above reasons, position markers are of much help to electric guitarists of any level of competence.

== Steel guitar ==
Steel guitars often have multiple necks and were among the first multi-neck instruments; each neck is tuned differently to afford more chord voicings. in the 1940s, lap steel guitars had up to four necks.

== Violin ==
The neck of a violin is usually maple with a flamed figure compatible with that of the ribs and back. The shape of the neck and fingerboard affect how easily the violin may be played. Fingerboards are dressed to a particular transverse curve, and have a small lengthwise "scoop," or concavity, slightly more pronounced on the lower strings, especially when meant for gut or synthetic strings. Many authentic old instruments have had their necks reset to a slightly increased angle, and lengthened by about a centimeter. The neck graft allows the original scroll to be kept with a Baroque violin when bringing its neck to conformance with modern standards.

== Lute ==
The neck of a lute is made of light wood, with a veneer of hardwood (usually ebony) to provide durability for the fretboard beneath the strings.

== Attachment in string instruments ==
The method of connecting the neck to the body of the instrument varies according to the instrument. This ranges from necks that are simply screwed onto the body of the instrument (such as in electric guitars like the Fender Stratocaster) to various types of glued joints.

There are basically four ways of attaching the neck to the body using glued joints:

- With a dovetail joint, where the dovetail is cut into the end of the neck assembly and fits into a mating mortise in the instrument's endblock. This is typically used on acoustic and hollow-body electric guitars.
- With a simpler mortise and tenon joint, which is similar to a dovetail joint, except that the tenon is straight instead of tapered. Sometimes these joints are reinforced with screws, nails or pins. Since this joint is inherently weaker than a dovetail joint, it is usually only found on violins and similar instruments with less string tension.
- With a neck that ends in a "foot" that is glued to the instrument body proper. This method is mostly used in building classical and flamenco guitars. The "foot" is on the bottom of the neck, and affords a large gluing surface to the back of the instrument.
- With neck-through, making the neck part of the body. This method is used on some solid-body electric guitars, where the piece of wood that is the neck runs the entire length of the instrument and is laminated to the rest of the body. This makes an extremely strong joint.

The two factors in deciding what type of neck joint to use are:

1. Its general joint strength; and
2. Its repairability: While the latter two methods (using a "foot" and laminating the neck into the instrument) create very strong joints, they are not very repairable, and require tearing the instrument apart if repairs are needed.

== Profile ==
A profile is the shape of the neck's cross-section. A variety of shapes are used and the choice is a matter of personal taste and preference.

== See also ==
- Bolt-on neck
- Set-in neck
