= Swamp ash =

Wood of ash trees

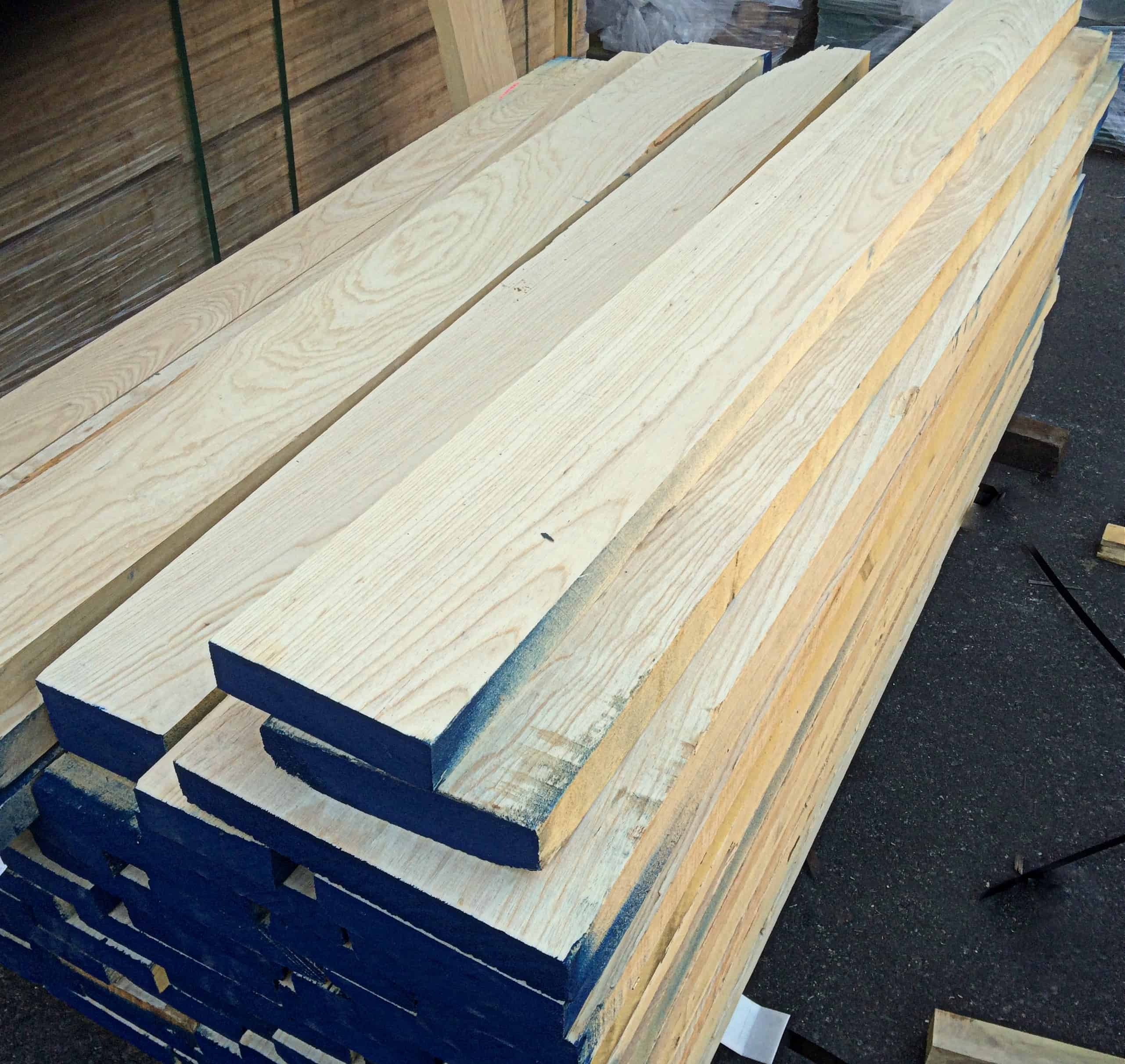
An open bundle of 8/4 Swamp Ash lumber.

Swamp ash is a common name for several North American trees in the genus Fraxinus which may grow in swamps and other wetlands. The wood of swamp ashes is relatively low in density and is used in the construction of musical instruments, particularly electric guitars.

Swamp ash may refer to:

- Fraxinus caroliniana, native to the southeastern United States and Cuba
- Fraxinus nigra, native to the northeastern United States and eastern Canada
- Fraxinus pennsylvanica, broadly distributed in North America east of the Rocky Mountains

As of 2020, climate change is creating a shortage of swamp ash suitable for making electric guitars.
