= Set-in neck =

Stringed instrument construction method

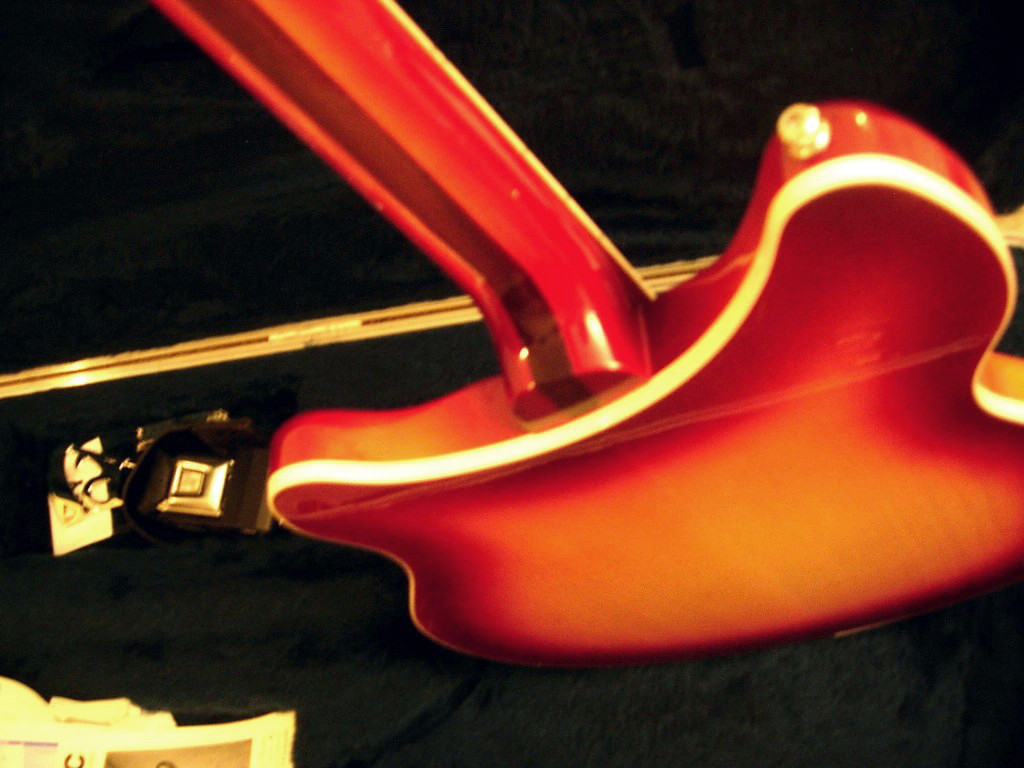
Set-in neck on a Rickenbacker electric guitar

A set-in neck (often shortened to set neck) is a traditional form of joining the neck of a stringed instrument with its body. This is typically done with a tightly fitted mortise-and-tenon or dovetail joint, secured with glue. Sonic qualities often attributed to this style of neck joint include a warm tone, long sustain, and a large surface area to transmit string vibration, leading to a "live" feeling instrument, but hard physical evidence for any of these is lacking, and the attribution of long sustain has been definitively contradicted by experimentation. In guitars it also often allows superior access to top frets closest to the body.

It is a common belief that this yields a stronger body-to-neck connection than an inexpensive mechanically joined bolt-on neck. There's also a third method, neck-through construction, which requires more material to provide an even stronger connection.

Set-in necks are the most popular method for acoustic guitars. Almost all major acoustic guitar manufacturers (but with exceptions) use set-in necks and have applied this method also to their electric guitars; most notably, Gibson and Gretsch. With hollow body set-in neck electric guitars of the 1940s being rather expensive to buy and repair, newcomer Fender in 1950 introduced electric guitars that were easier to manufacture, combining a simple solid body with a bolt-on neck. Fender also introduced the electric bass guitar by adding a longer neck bolted to a solid guitar body.

== Advantages ==
Typically cited advantages of set-in neck include:

- Warmer tone
- More sustain
- Often, better access to top frets compared to bolt-on necks that use a square metal plate
- Because the increased surface area results in more transmission of strings vibration, set in necks can feel more "alive" than if bolted on.

== Disadvantages ==
- Harder and more expensive to mass manufacture than bolt-on necks
- Harder and more expensive to repair or service because the glue must be steamed or melted with a hot knife
- No control over the neck-to-body angle; changing it requires a luthier to disassemble and re-glue the neck.

== Manufacturers ==
Notable manufacturers of guitars with set-in necks include:

- Gibson
- Gretsch
- Paul Reed Smith
