= Neck-through-body construction =

Method of electric guitar construction

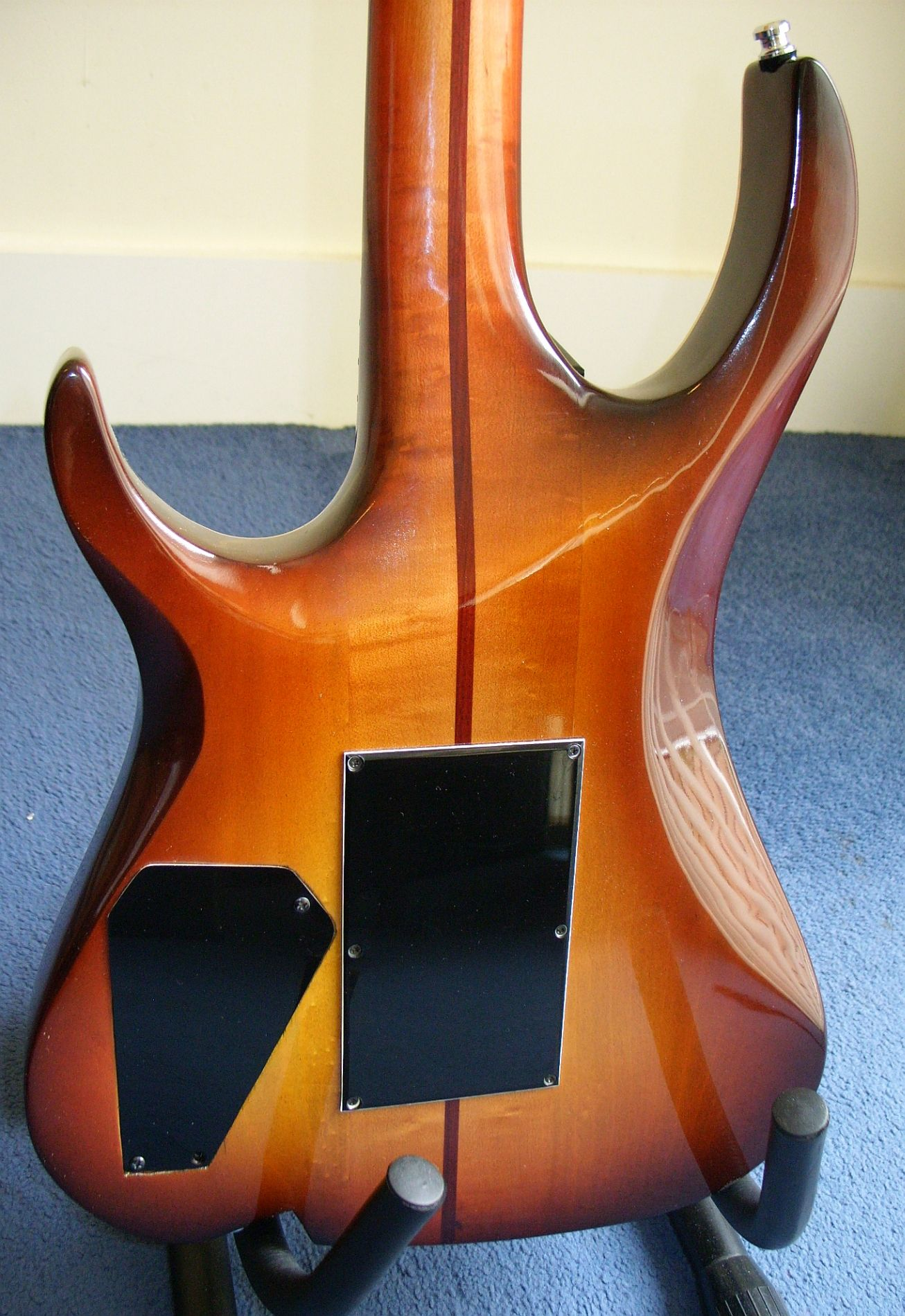
This JJ Hucke Antarctica model guitar has neck-thru construction with no discernible heel. This greatly facilitates high fret access. The neck is bird's eye flamed maple and purpleheart, while the "wings" are poplar.

Neck-through-body (commonly neck-thru or neck-through) is a method of electric guitar construction that combines the instrument's neck and core of its body into a single unit. This may be made of a solid piece of wood, or two or more laminated together. The strings, nut, fretboard, pickups and bridge are all mounted on this central core. Additional body side components (if any) that fill-out its shape are glued or mechanically attached to this central core. These are referred to as "wings". The construction technique is also used on electric bass guitars.

Neck-through-body construction is considerably more expensive than the traditional glued set-in neck and bolt-on neck style construction methods. However, it is less costly than the very rare and difficult "one-piece" fabrication of an entire instrument from a single piece of material.

== History ==
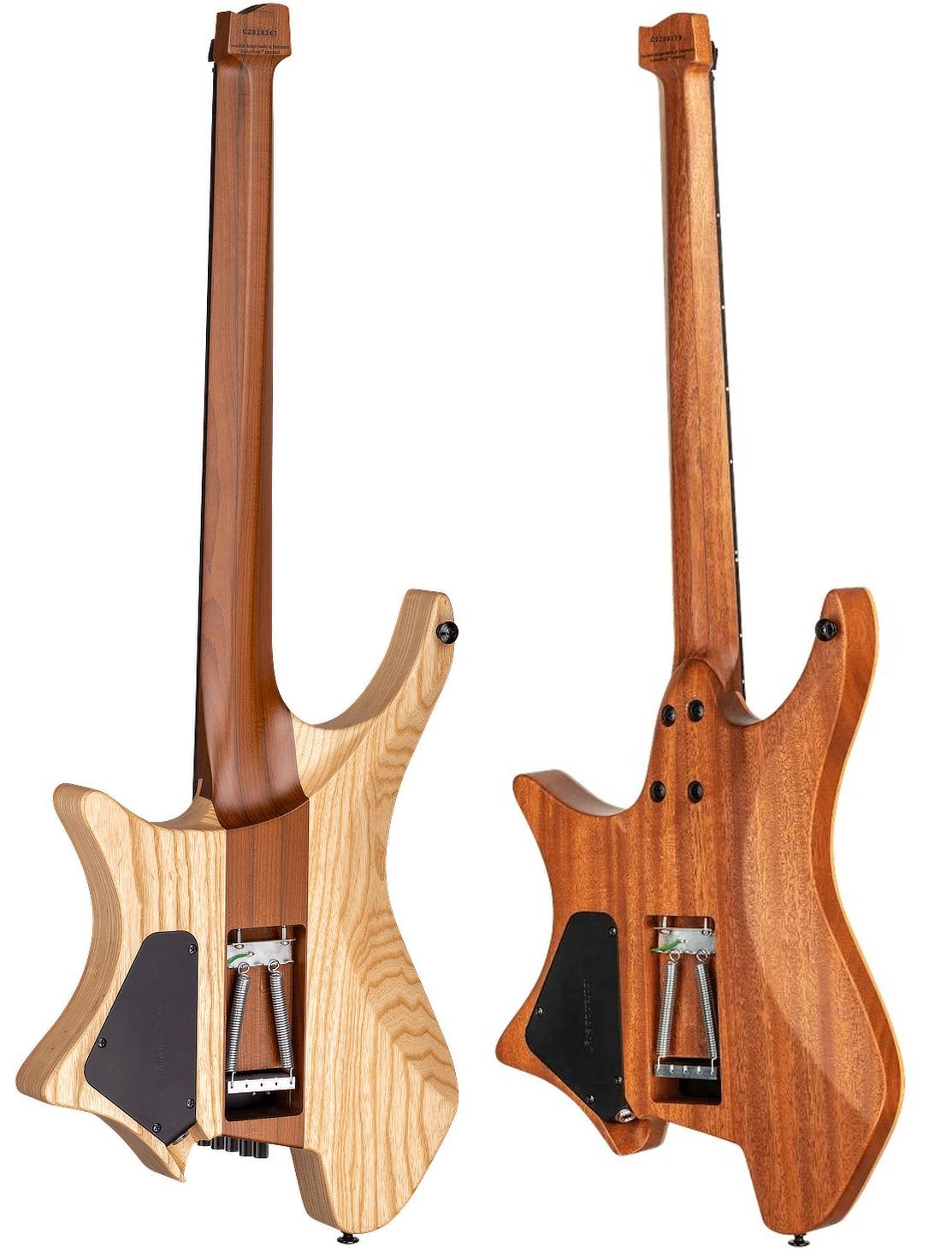
Two headless Strandberg Boden Plini model guitars with differing construction methods. On the left is neck-through construction with a quartersawn roasted maple neck and swamp ash wings. On the right is chamfered bolt-on quartersawn mahogany neck and mahogany body. Notice the flush mounted screws to reduce heel profile. Both necks have carbon-fiber reinforcement strips.

The first electric bass guitar, the solid-body "Audiovox 736" created by Paul Tutmarc circa 1937, had a neck-through construction.

"The Log", a prototype solid-body guitar built by Les Paul in 1941, can be considered as a forerunner of neck-through designed instrument. Les Paul built the model using a recycled 4x4 fence post as the neck and body core, and mounted the disassembled parts of an Epiphone and Gibson archtop guitar onto it.

The 1952-57 Harmony H44 had this construction feature.

In 1956 Rickenbacker was one of the first guitar manufacturers to use the modern variant of this technique, although this was originally restricted exclusively to semi-hollowbody guitars.

== Benefits and drawbacks ==
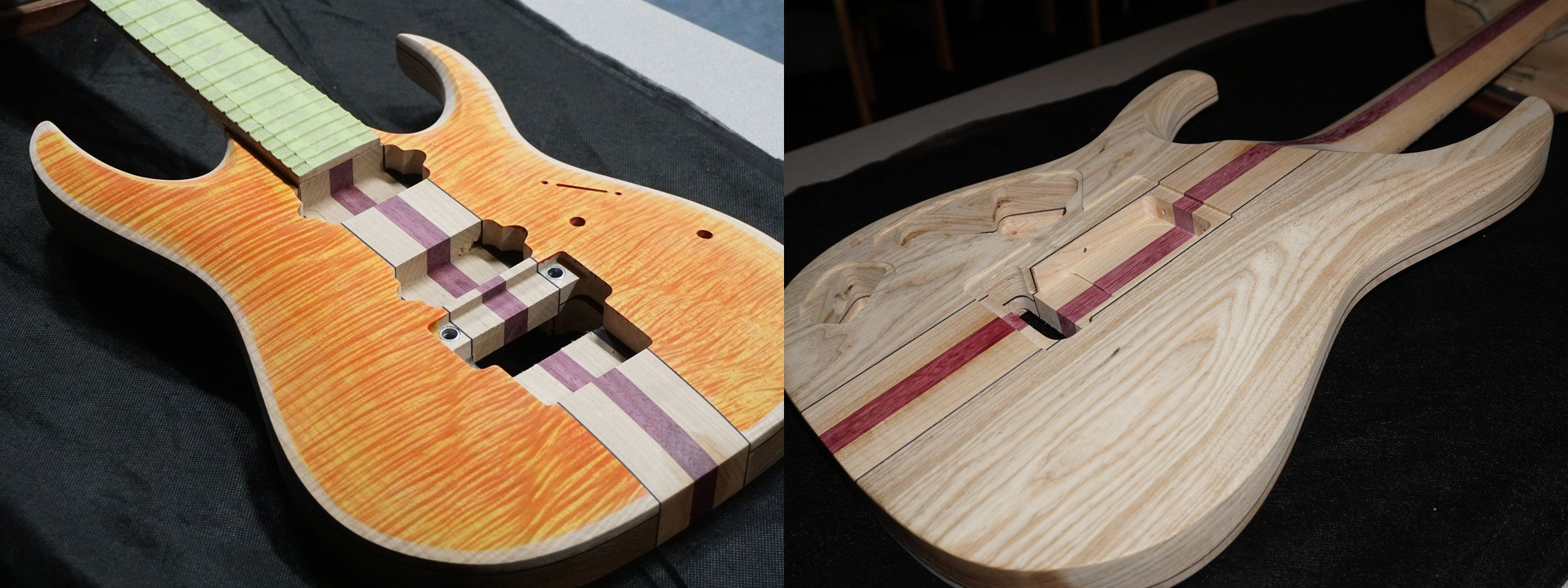
Front & back of an Ibanez RG model with a central neck-through core laminate constructed of maple/purpleheart/maple running the length of the instrument. The glued-on wings are made from swamp ash. The top has a stained AAA grade flame maple cap. The heel of this instrument has been significantly chamfered to improve high-register access.

A neck-thru guitar may sound warmer than a bolt-on construction instrument, with more sustain as well as better tuning stability and more easily attainable low fret action. Scientific studies on the subject are lacking, and at least one experiment seemed to contradict the logic.

The construction of a neck-thru instrument makes it inherently more rigid than a bolt on instrument and therefore somewhat less susceptible to temperature and humidity changes. All guitars require maintenance and benefit from careful monitoring of humidity, but perhaps, electric neck-thru guitars require the least monitoring of all wooden guitars, and perhaps all wooden fretted instruments.
