= Bolt-on neck =

Stringed instrument construction method

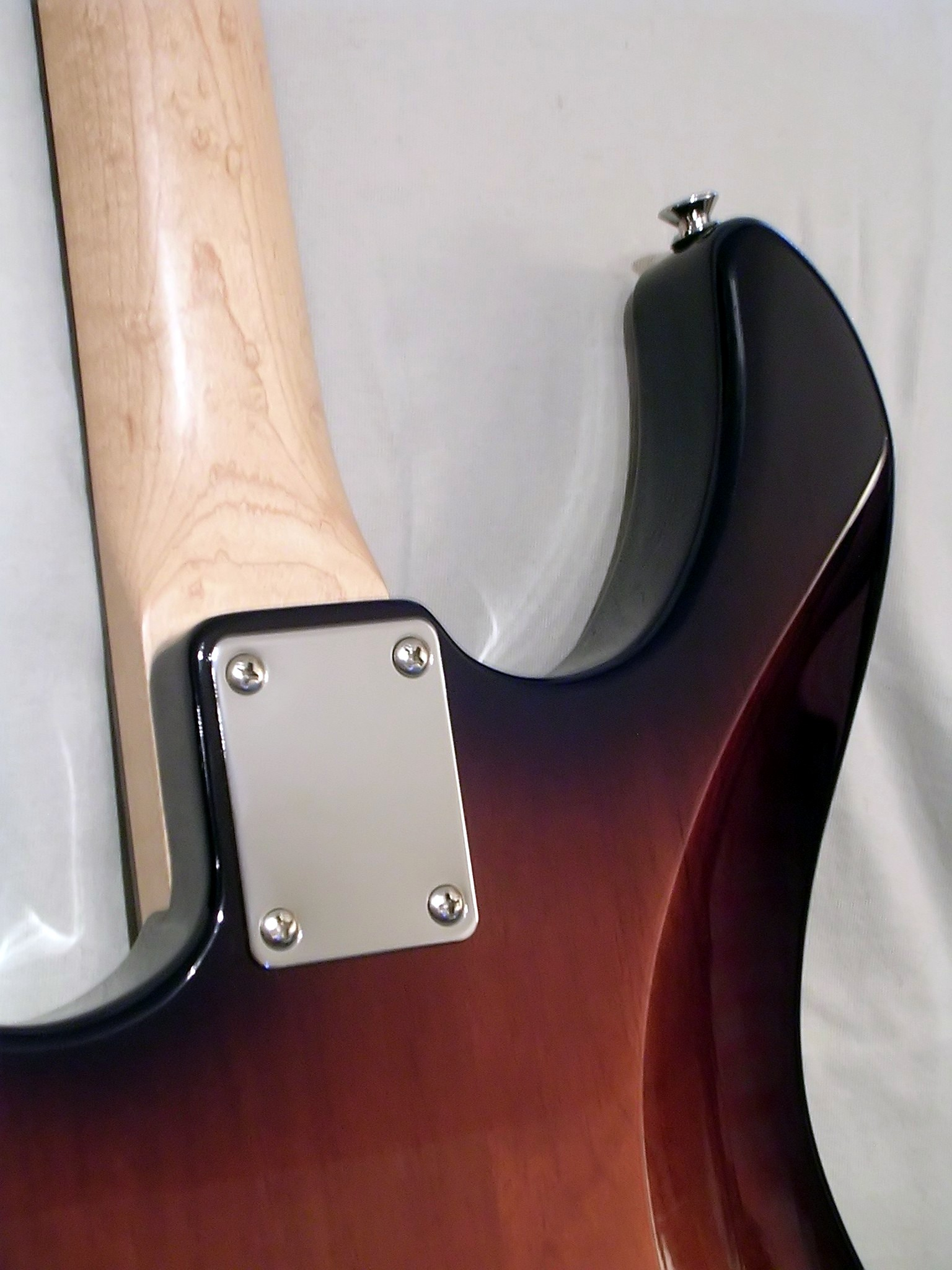
Neck joint with a four-screw plate on a Yamaha Pacifica 112 electric guitar

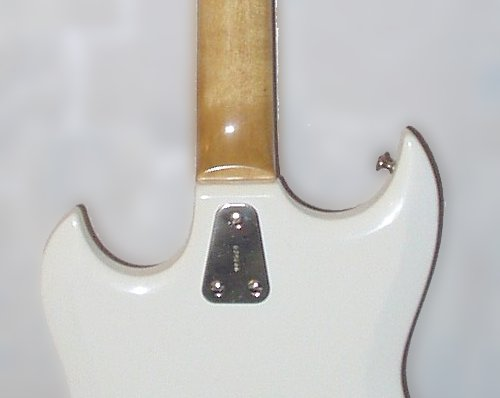
Less-common three-screw assembly with plate, on a Hagström III guitar

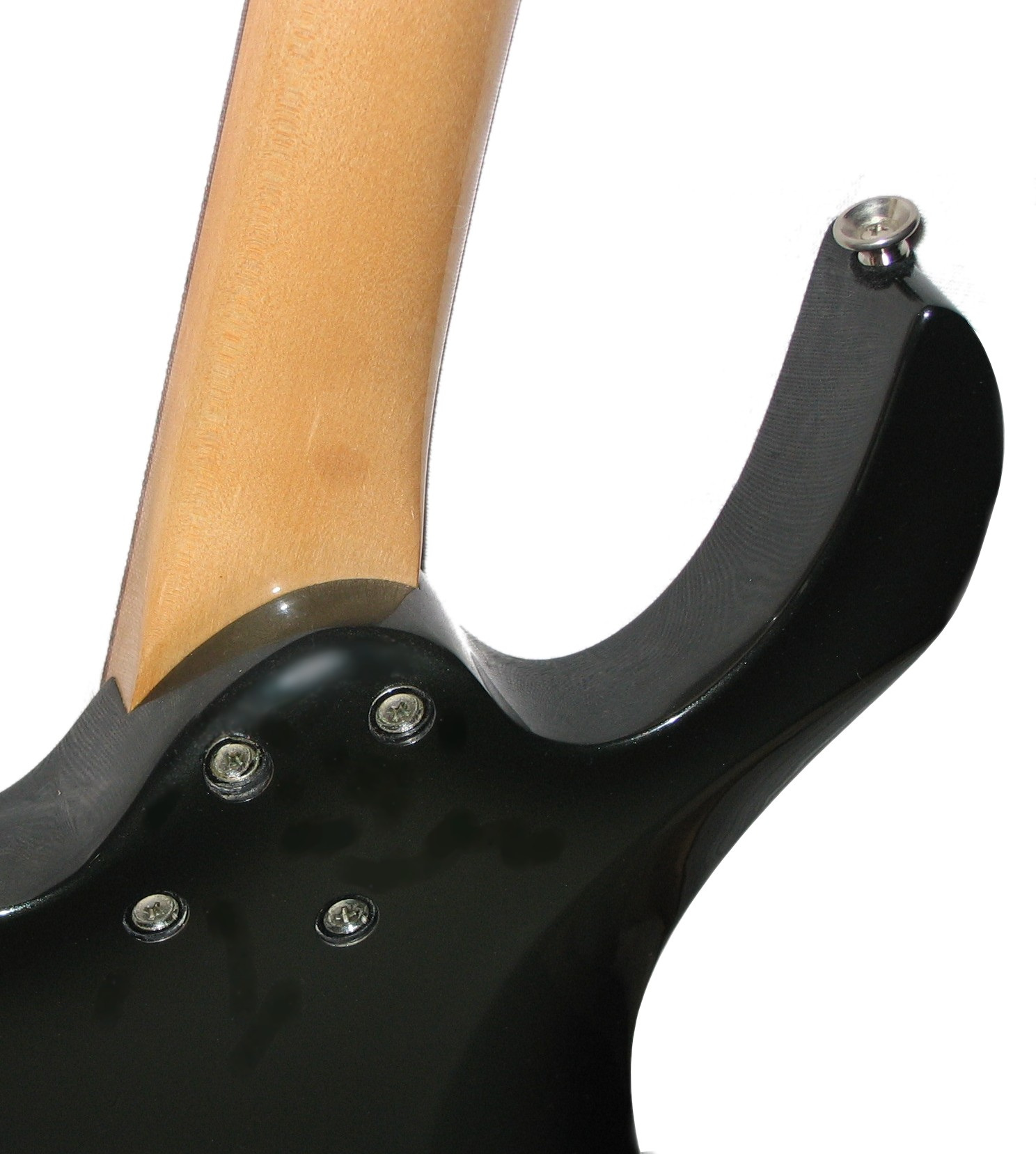
Slim bolt-on neck join with chamfered heel and countersunk ferrules on a superstrat electric guitar allows for more comfortable access to top frets

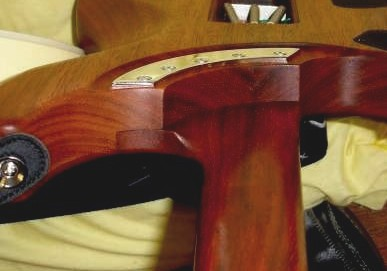
Stephen's Extended Cutaway (on Washburn N4 electric guitar) is another version of bolt-on neck joint

A bolt-on neck is a stringed musical instrument neck that attaches to the instrument body with either bolts or screws, as opposed to glue and joinery as with set-in neck joints.

== Methods ==
The "bolt-on" method is used frequently on solid body electric guitars and on acoustic flattop guitars. In the typical electric guitar neck joint, the body and neck cross in horizontal plane. The neck is inserted into a pre-routed opening in the body (which is commonly called a "pocket"), and then joined using three to four screws. Certain designs may use more than four screws.

As the pressure of screw heads damages the wood surfaces, and the undistributed stress could put the instrument body at structural risk, typically a rectangular metal plate (or a pair of smaller plates) is used to secure the joint and re-distribute the screw pressure more evenly. The plate can then be used to emboss a manufacturer's logos, stamp serial numbers, or include decorative artwork.

Some makers of electric guitars with bolt-on necks (Fender in particular) write a production date on the heel of the component neck, where it is hidden when the neck is attached to the body. The neck can then be removed to check the date, which is often cross-referenced with the serial number to accurately date and identify the guitar.

=== Methods of attachment ===
The term "bolt-on" is often a misnomer, introduced mostly by Fender whose electric guitars and basses have largely had component necks held to the instrument's body with wood screws. Actual bolted joints (i.e., a bolt coupled with a nut) exist — particularly in acoustic guitars — but are less common in electric guitars. One particular example of a bolt-on neck using an actual bolt is Brian May's homemade Red Special, which uses a single bolt held in place by the guitar's truss rod and secured with a nut on the rear of the body.

An acoustic guitar bolt-on neck popularized by Taylor Guitars includes threaded inserts in the heel of the neck. Bolts inserted through the neck block of the body from inside the instrument attach the neck to the body.

== Pros and cons ==
=== Advantages ===
Luthiers and guitar players cite both advantages and disadvantages of bolt-on neck construction. Many of these views are highly subjective and relative; instrument manufacture varies widely and, lacking parallel objective factors, any particular claim might not be applicable generally.

Cited advantages of bolt-on neck include:

- easier and cheaper to mass produce. If a guitar of neck-through-body construction is damaged during the assembly process or otherwise fails its final quality evaluation, the instrument might need to be entirely scrapped; for instance, an irreparable neck flaw requires destruction of an otherwise perfect body, or a finish flaw would require that the entire instrument be refinished. This costs the manufacturer not only materials but the time and manpower involved (at best, salvaging only the hardware). Set-neck instruments (including most acoustic guitars) may be more readily repairable than neck-through, but separating the glue-set joint takes a skilled luthier away from productive duties. The bolt-on style is ideally suited to large-scale assembly lines, defective components are readily separated or replaced by unskilled workers, and recovery costs are minimized.
- easier to repair (if damaged) or to modify. Necks that allow Fender "standard" four-screw joint are widely interchangeable (provided they are intended for the same style of guitar, e.g., either Stratocaster or Telecaster). An aftermarket neck may be readily ordered, selected for the specific preferences of the player (neck shape, fingerboard radius, types of wood, finish, fret profile) and installed by someone relatively unskilled, using only commonly available tools. As well, if a guitar's body is damaged beyond practical repair, the neck is easily paired with another body. Ready removal significantly eases the repair process, whether of neck or body.

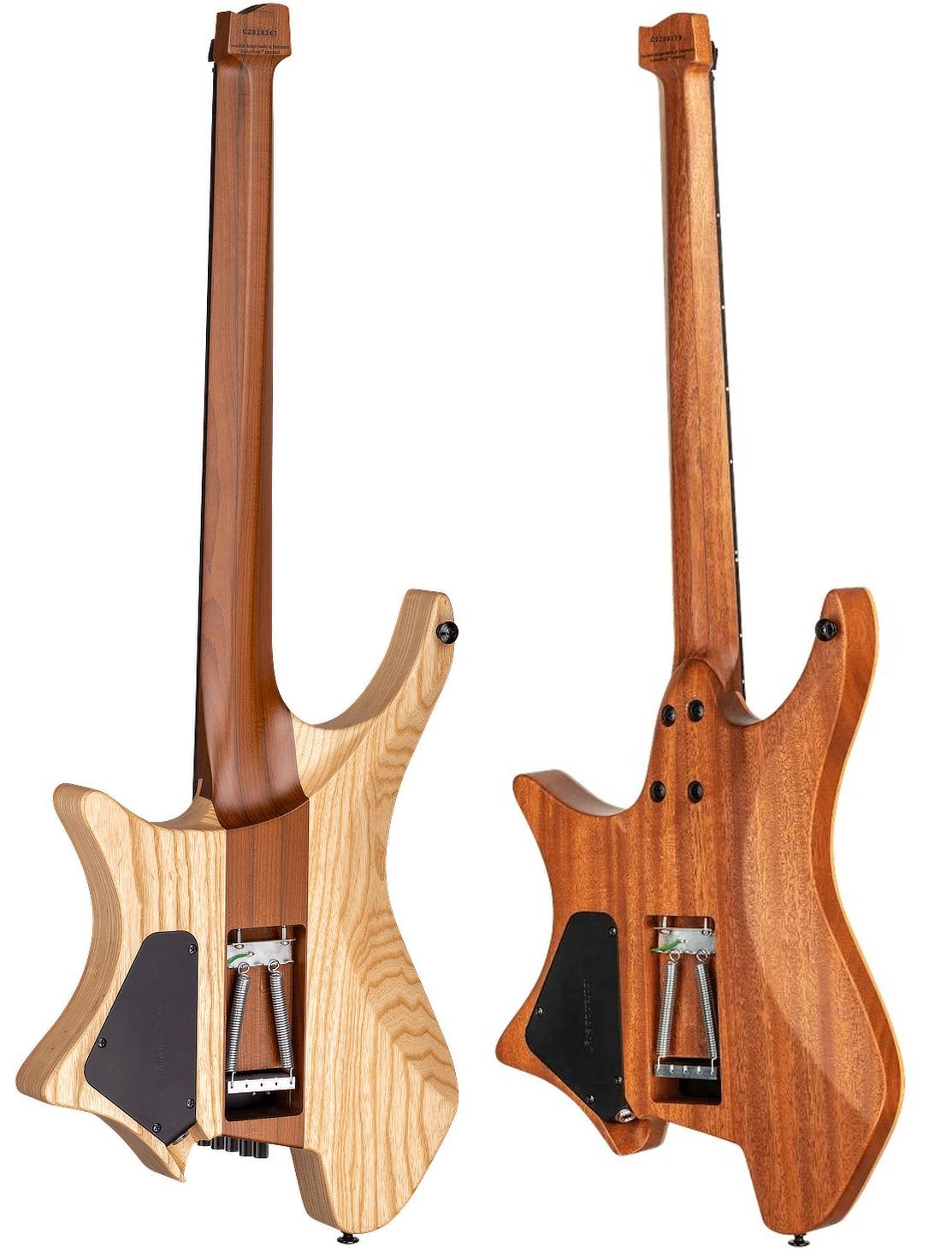
Two headless Strandberg Boden Plini model guitars with differing construction methods. On the left is neck-through construction with a quartersawn roasted maple neck and swamp ash wings. On the right is a chamfered bolt-on quartersawn mahogany neck, with countersunk ferrules and screws, and mahogany body. Both necks have visible carbon reinforcement strips.

- easy to control. The height of a guitar's strings at the bridge is not always ideal, and varies in a mass-production environment. The solution is to change the neck-to-body angle, which is impossible with a neck-through design and difficult with a set-neck. A bolt-on neck can readily have a shim inserted between the heel and body, or even have the heel planed fractionally to change the angle (this method is much superior to shims both structurally and tonally). Some bolt-on designs incorporate an adjustment screw that provides fine adjustment for the neck-to-body angle, such as the Fender "Micro-Tilt" adjustment as used on their Deluxe American Stratocaster.
- more attack and "snap", slightly brighter tone, more resonance and sustain. All of these are debated.

=== Disadvantages ===
Disadvantages of bolt-on construction include:

- upper-fret restriction. Because of the structural necessity of attaching the body to the neck, the result is that the heel area is required to be comparatively thick. In addition, the hardware (particularly a heel plate) adds obstruction. These factors limit how much material can be removed in a cutaway, and then block access to part of whatever room can be achieved. Various designs have been employed to mitigate this, from a contoured heel plate or replacing the plate with a countersunk ferrule under each screw head, up to idiosyncratic neck joint designs such as the Ibanez AANJ (All Access Neck Joint), the Music Man Silhouette, and the Stephen's Extended Cutaway as used by Washburn (particularly the higher-end Nuno Bettencourt signature models). It's for these reasons that a neck-through construction, although costly and difficult to make, is desirable, removing the heel joint altogether.
- sloppy construction or assembly exacerbates any of its inherent disadvantages.

== Manufacturers ==
Manufacturers of guitars with bolt-on necks include:

- B.C. Rich
- Fender
- Squier
- Music Man
- Yamaha
- Ibanez
- Kiesel Guitars/Carvin
- ESP Guitars
- Epiphone
- G&L
- Suhr
- Hagström
- Taylor acoustics, using a patented bolt-in construction process with three bolts
- Seagull, an acoustic guitar brand manufactured by Godin
- Jackson
- Charvel
- Cort Guitars
- Washburn Guitars
