= ESP Guitars =

Japanese guitar manufacturer

ESP Guitar Company
- Native name: 株式会社イーエスピー
- Type: Private
- Industry: Musical instruments
- Founded: 1975; 51 years ago
- Founder: Shibuya Hisatake (1937–2024)
- Headquarters: Tokyo, Japan
- Area served: Worldwide
- Key people: Yamada Masanori (president); Todd Binder (CEO)
- Products: Electric guitars, bass guitars
- Owner: Hisatake Shibuya
- Subsidiaries: LTD Guitars; Grassroots Guitars; Edwards Guitars; Navigator Guitars
- Website: Espguitars.com (Global); Espguitars.co.jp (Japan)

ESP Company, Limited (株式会社イーエスピー, Kabushiki Gaisha Ī Esu Pī) is a Japanese guitar manufacturer, primarily focussed on the production of electric guitars and basses. They are based in both Tokyo and Los Angeles, with distinct product-lines for each market. ESP Company manufactures instruments under several names, including "ESP Standard", "ESP Custom Shop", "LTD Guitars and Basses", "Navigator", "Edwards Guitars and Basses", and "Grassroots".

== History ==
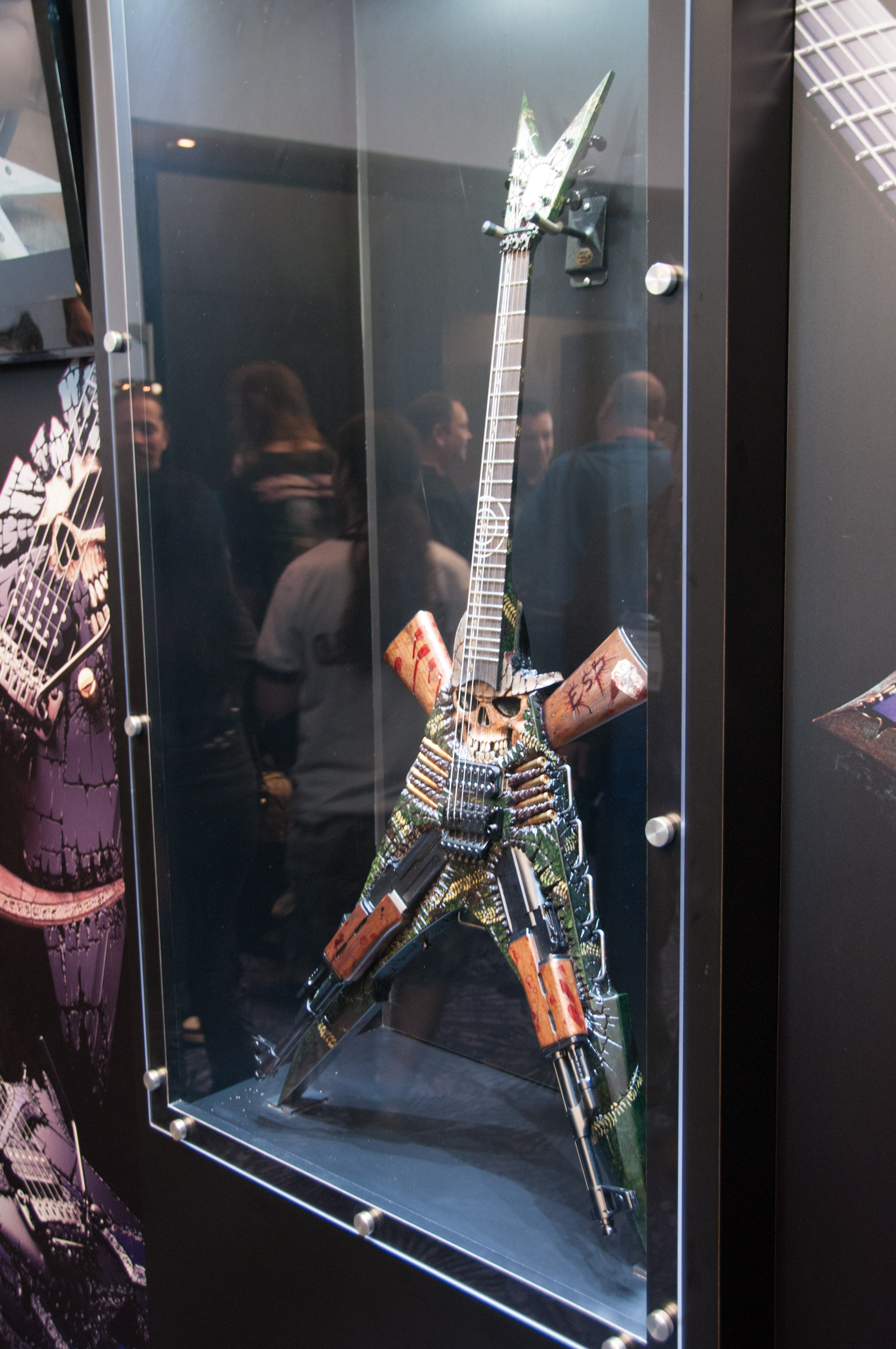
ESP Custom Shop "Ghost Soldier"

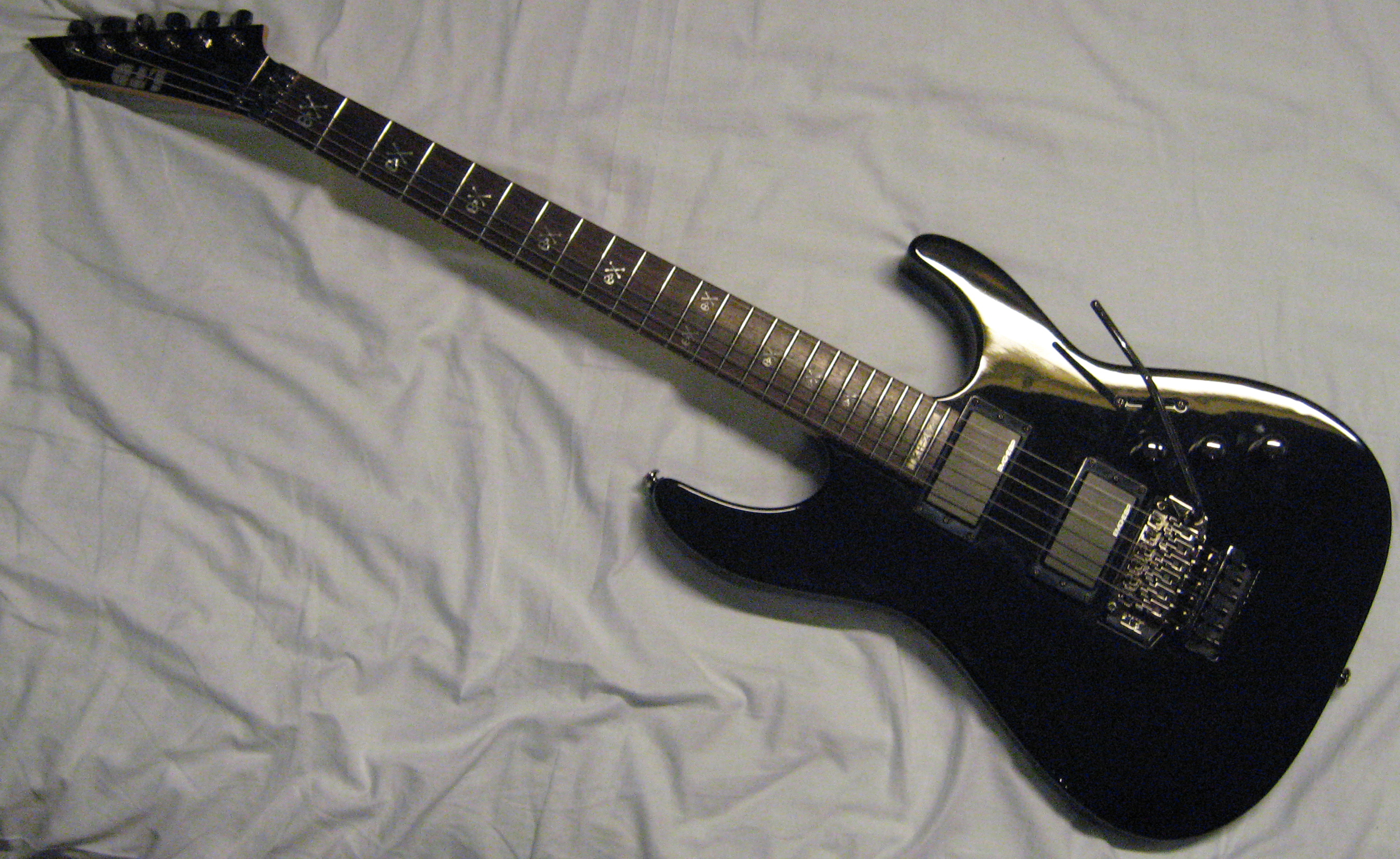
ESP LTD KH202

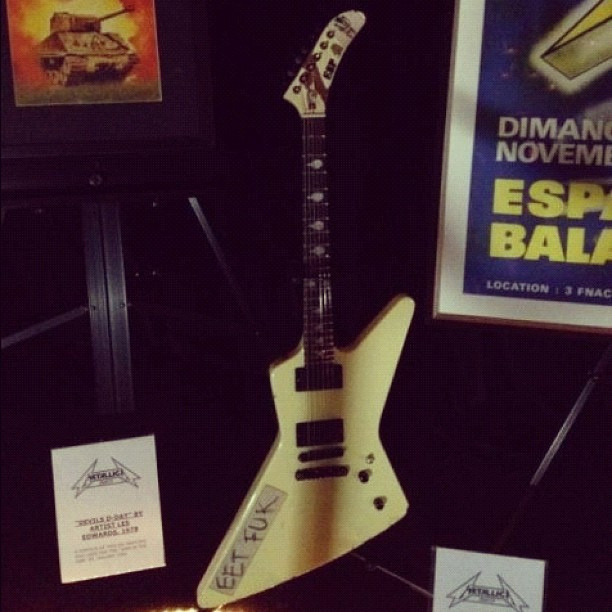
James Hetfield's Eet Fuk Guitar

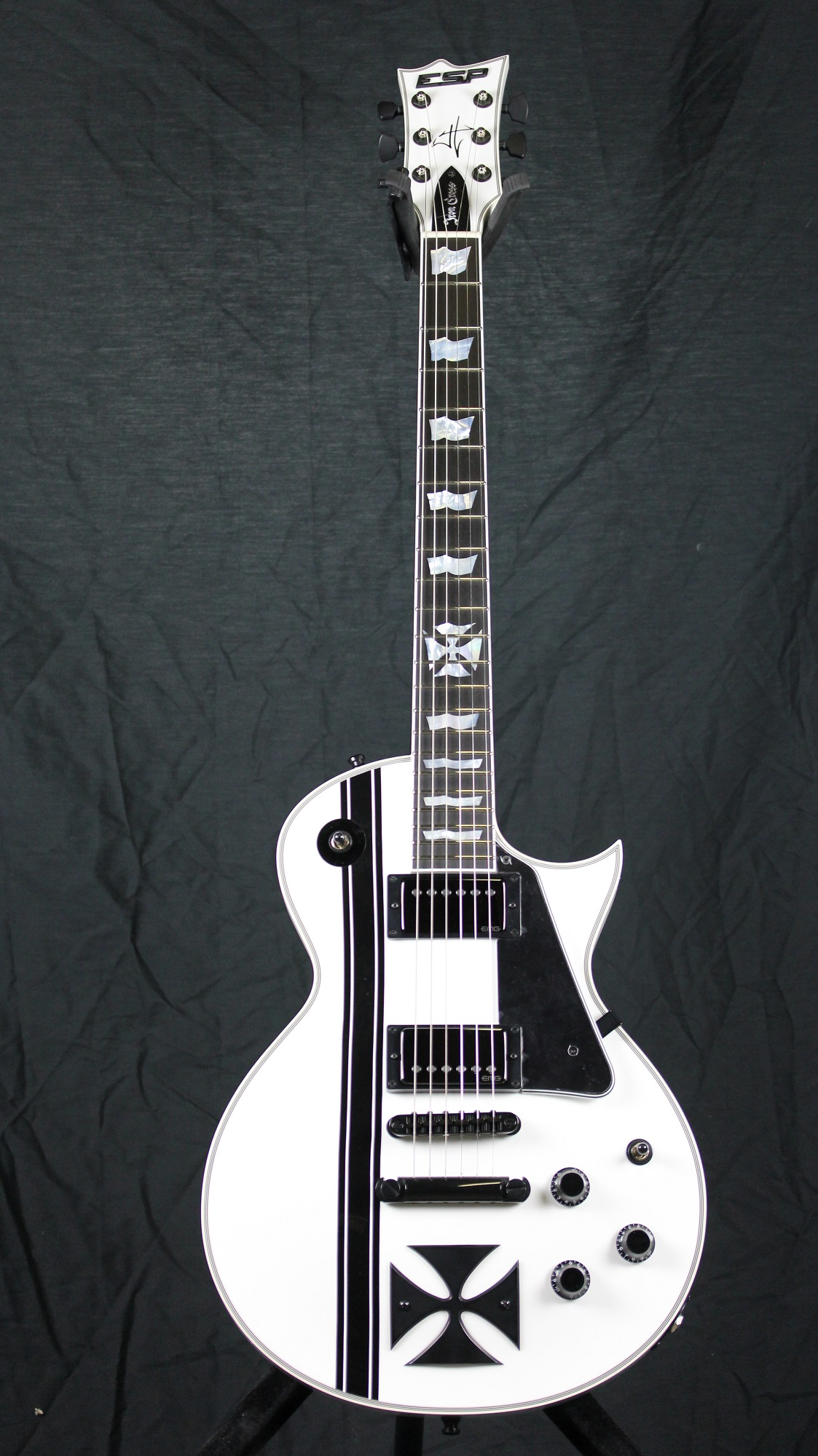
"Iron Cross" model

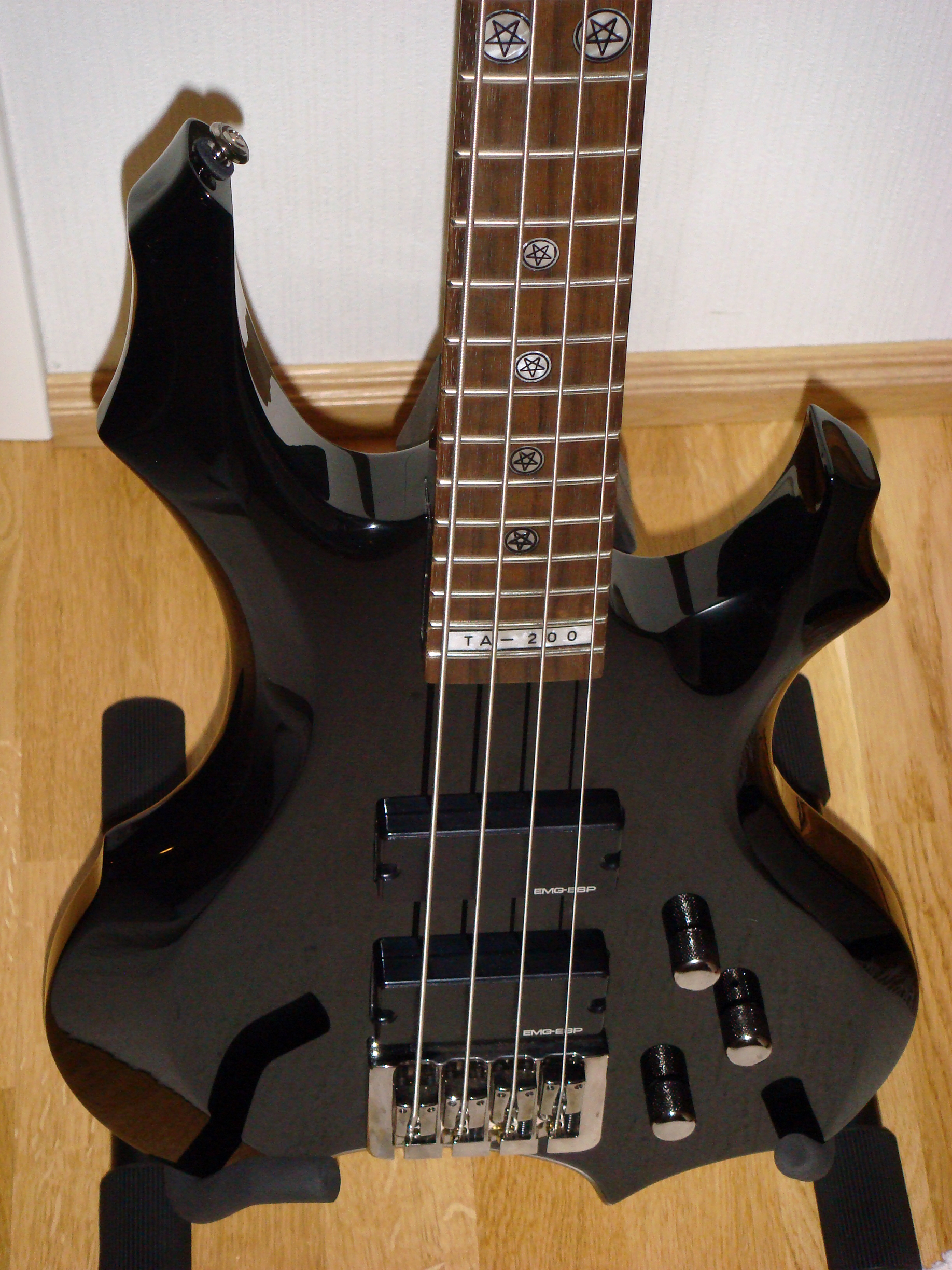
TA-200 bass guitar

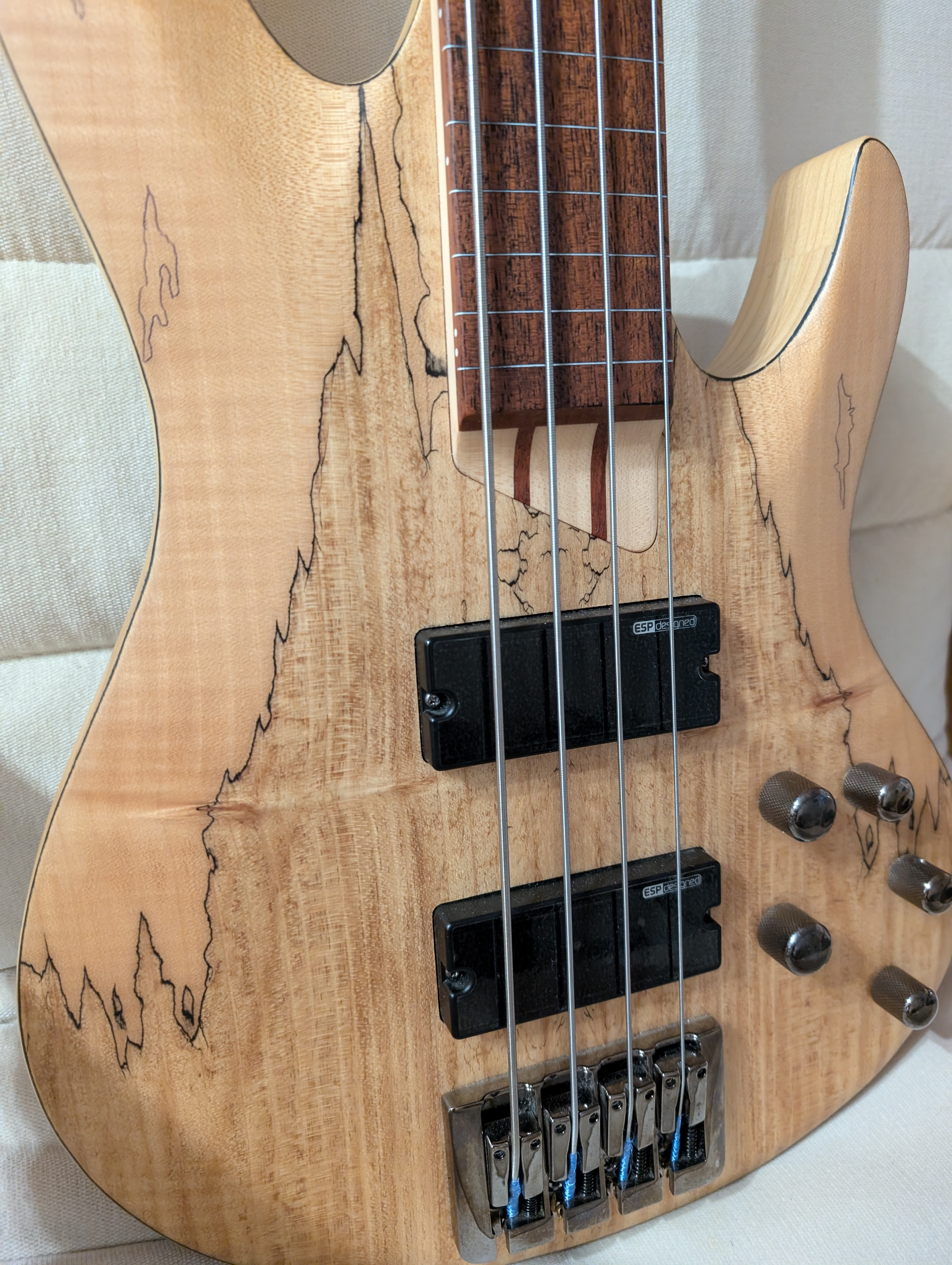
ESP Ltd. B204 SM FL fretless bass

In 1975, Hisatake Shibuya opened a shop called Electric Sound Products (ESP) in Tokyo, Japan, which provided custom replacement parts for guitars. At this time, ESP also began making guitars under the ESP and Navigator brand in the Japanese market.

ESP replacement parts were first introduced into the US in 1983 and began crafting custom instruments for local New York artists between 1984 and 1985. Among these artists were Vernon Reid (Living Colour), Vinnie Vincent and Bruce Kulick (KISS), Sid McGinnis of Late Night with David Letterman and Ronnie Wood (The Rolling Stones). At this time, ESP also introduced the 400 Series as the first production line to be distributed in the US.

During this same period, ESP began making the bodies and necks for Kramer Guitars and other manufacturers were using ESP as an OEM such as Robin Guitars, Schecter Guitar Research and DiMarzio. Many traits of the Kramer line are still visible including neck construction and body bevels. ESP tooled up for Tom Anderson's shaved bolt on neck heel on the Schecter bodies and this has since become a feature of their house brand.

In 1985, George Lynch discovered ESP while on tour in Tokyo. Lynch walked into an ESP shop looking for a replacement neck and learned that ESP also built custom guitars. As a result, his famous ESP Kamikaze was made and ESP released George Lynch's Kamikaze as its first signature model. ESP soon introduced the M1 Standard, MI Custom, Horizon Custom, and the Surveyor bass.

At this time, ESP based its headquarters in a loft in downtown New York City on 19th Street. In 1989, the headquarters were moved to 48th Street near other music stores.

Between 1990 and 1992, ESP expanded its Signature Series as well as its standard product line. The US replacement parts business was discontinued in order to focus solely on their guitar and bass line, as well as the Custom Shop series. There are about 41 signature series guitars.

In 1993, ESP moved its headquarters again but this time to Los Angeles, on Sunset Boulevard in Hollywood. In 1995, the LTD series was created to sell ESP's products at a more affordable price. Soon after the introduction of the Korean and Indonesian-made LTD lines, ESP stopped selling the majority of its Japanese-made flagship guitars in the United States, due to the high prices involved in exporting to the Americas. The lone exception was ESP's artist signature series, which remained ESP (rather than LTD) models. In the early 2000s, ESP resumed exporting the standard Japanese-made lines to the United States (where they are popular among heavy metal and hard rock players), though at greatly increased prices compared to the early 1990s.

Similarly to Ibanez, ESP's chief competitor in Japan, ESP was initially known for making high-quality and customized replicas of famous American guitars, including Strats and Teles, as well as Gibson Explorers. The Explorer replica, known as the EXP/MX, shot to fame when avid ESP user James Hetfield's band Metallica rose to popularity in the late 80s/early 90s. Models similar to Hetfield's white ESP even today sell for thousands of dollars beyond the original retail price. However, just like with Ibanez, when Gibson realized the extent to which ESP was cutting into sales of its own guitars, it threatened a lawsuit to prevent sales of these guitars in the Americas. ESP redesigned its lines to be less similar to the American models.

In 2002, ESP was ranked among the music industry's fastest-growing companies. This is largely due to the Fender buyout of Jackson Guitars, whom ESP had struggled to compete with throughout the 1980s and 1990s. After the buyout, many Jackson endorsers switched over to ESP.

As of March 2015, ESP began distributing Takamine Guitars in the United States.

Hisatake Shibuya died on late September 2024 at age 87.

== Manufacturing-operations ==
Original series and Custom Shop ESPs are handcrafted in Japan while the Standard Series ESPs are factory-made in Japan.

In 1996, ESP started its "LTD" series. are more affordable and cater mainly for markets outside Japan. The 1000 series LTDs are made on an assembly line in Korea whereas the 401 series and below are made in Indonesia.

LTD basses are instruments mainly aimed at beginners. Over the years manufacturing has moved between various locations, including Vietnam, China and Indonesia. Intermediate models were manufactured in Korea in the early 2000s (decade). The quality from these has led to continued demand for the LTD series.

Additionally, ESP has two separate Japan-only lines of guitars, the Grassroots (lower end) and Edwards (Mid-range). The Grassroots line is manufactured in Korea and are the equivalent or better than the Sub-400 series LTDs and can be considered a budget line. The Edwards guitars, on the other hand, the final setup is made in Japan but the bodies and painting are made in China (except for very few Edwards models that are made in Japan, but those are the exception to the rule) and boast similar hardware as their higher-end ESP counterparts but are not handcrafted. In terms of quality, in contrast to the USA lines (i.e. ESP Standard & LTD), the Edwards line generally lies in between the more upmarket LTDs and ESP Standards.

ESP guitars cater to a wide range of players. There are a variety of models including Superstrat-styled guitars, Les Paul-styled guitars, Flying V-styled, Star-shaped and others. ESP technically has two lines, one for USA and Japan, but there are slight differences. The ESP USA line does not include the Strat-like Snapper, the Forest GT, as well as some of the Japanese rock artist models but their custom line has been known to produce some of the most unusual designs such as a Gundam Beam-rifle replica guitar, as well as the "ESP Machinegun" used by the Japanese band Alfee.

ESP not only make guitars, they also produce various hardware parts themselves, like bass bridges or the ESP Flicker tremolo, ESP Labs Pickups, as well as sustainers, equalizers, etc. Usually these parts are only available for OEM use and not to the ordinary customer.

== Popularity ==
ESP found fame by making and endorsing guitars for guitarists who went on to become leading exponents of thrash metal in the 1980s, along with other guitar manufacturers Jackson and Dean, with bands Metallica, Slayer, Anthrax and Megadeth. As a result of these endorsements, ESP has become one of the most popular suppliers of guitars for heavy metal. ESP instruments are endorsed by musicians numbering in the hundreds. A complete list of them can be found on the Artists section of ESP Guitars' website.

The bass signatures by J, founder of Luna Sea, are one of the most influential models manufactured by ESP, with over 50,000 copies sold. From the same band, Sugizo also contributed significantly to the brand with his design ideas.

== Guitars and bass series ==
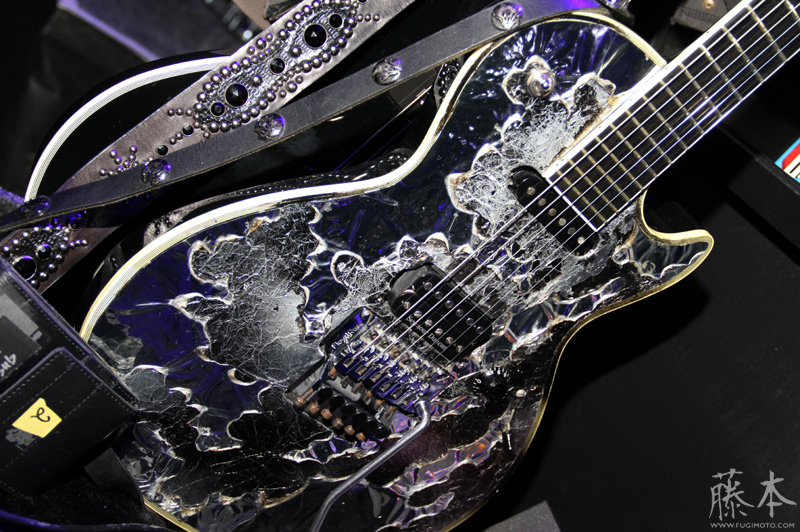
Luna Sea and X Japan guitarist Sugizo's signature ESP Eclipse S-VIII Brilliant MixedMedia guitar

Dependent on the target market (i.e. Asia, US, Europe) and brand (ESP, LTD or Xtone), various models are organized in marketing series.

The ESP Original series has three other lines of guitars, the Edwards, Grassroots and Navigator series and are largely based on these models as well as some ESP Standard series Models. ESP Edwards Series produces mid-to-high range guitars, at a quality near the ESP Standard series, whilst ESP Grass Roots Series cater towards a more value-oriented segment of the market and are more akin to the 400 series of LTDs, however these can vary. The ESP Navigator Series on the other hand is a line which produces mainly replicas of Gibson and Fender guitars and basses, to a very high standard.

ESP USA features the ESP Standard line (which was replaced in 2014 by E-II), as well as the lower end LTD and Xtone series. ESP USA's standard series generally caters more towards to metal players, with characteristics such as active pickups.

Another line of guitars, called LTD Elite, was introduced in 2013 for overseas markets, as the ESP Standard line was slowly being phased out. LTD Elite guitars are made in Japan, and initially offered alongside the ESP standard replacement brand E-II in the export market in 2013 while a limited range of ESP Standards were sold in the US to be phased out for E-II in 2014. The ESP Standard line had been completely discontinued by this time. E-II guitars initially resembled several Edwards designs, however in 2015 many new models and finishes not available to Edwards were released. In 2016, E-II receives many new and first-time models, including Eclipse guitars with a sculpted neck joint similar to Gibson's Axcess heel to improve playability. According to ESP, E-II is the direct successor to ESP Standard with no difference between the two except the name.

ESP Custom series

ESP also builds custom guitars and basses, made to the specifications of the customer and the quality of such custom guitars exceed that of the Original series. These can be ordered from ESP USA but they are made in Japan. Generally speaking custom guitars cost as much, or even more than Navigators depending on the choices of the consumer and are considered to cater for the top-end of the market. There is flexibility with the orders, as the guitars produced, do not have to be based on existing lines of guitars and basses.

ESP Artist series

The ESP Artist, or Signature series guitars are mass-produced versions of artist's personal guitars and basses. The quality of the ESP Artist/Signature models lie between Navigator/Custom Shop and the ESP Original series.

The Edwards, Grassroots and LTD artist models are in the higher-end segments of the respective lines of guitars and basses.
