= Dean Razorback =

Electric guitar model

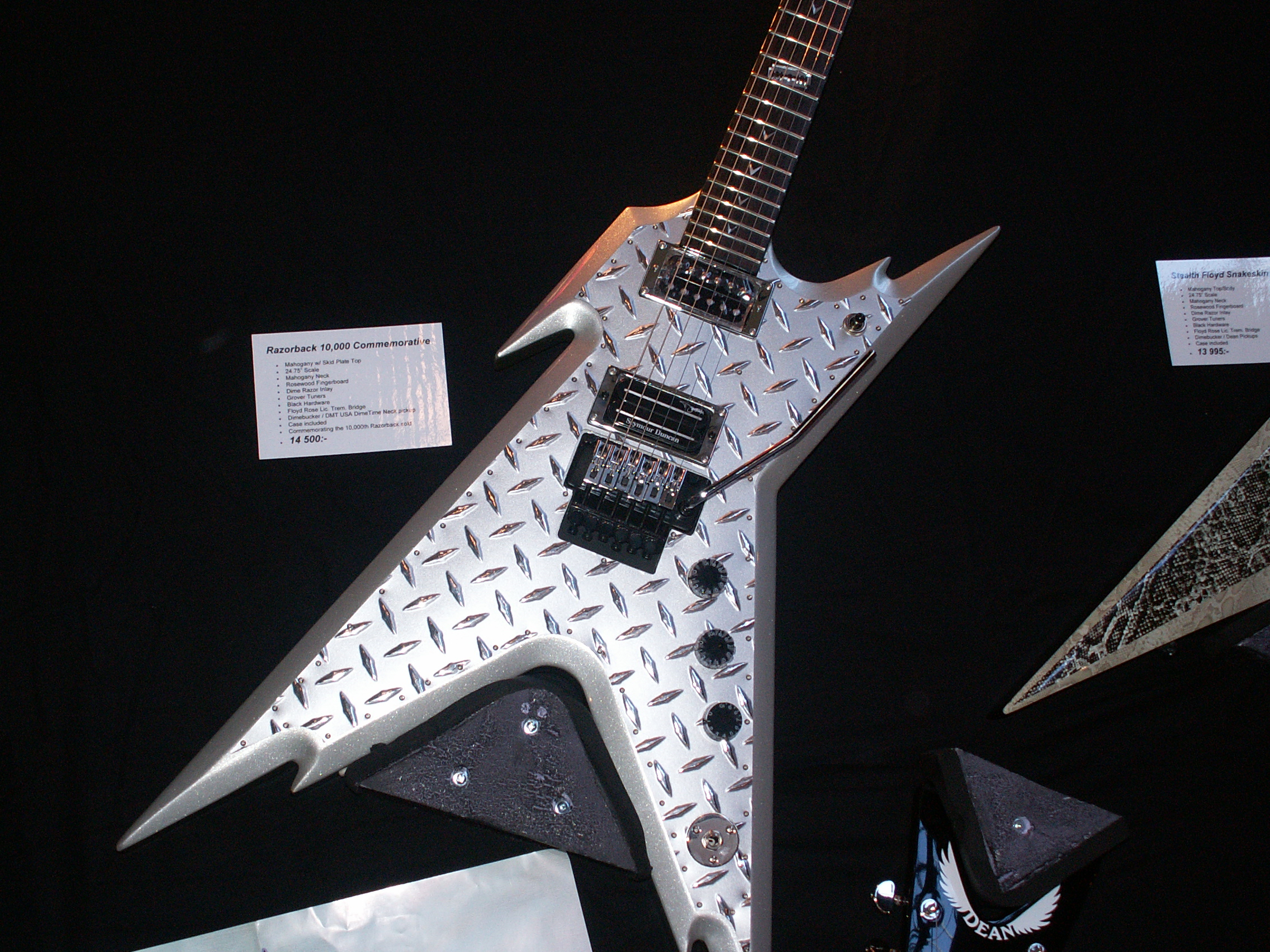
- Dean Razorback 10,000 Commemorative
- Manufacturer: Dean Guitars
- Period: 2004 — 2021

Construction
- Body type: Solid
- Neck joint: Set, Bolt on

Woods
- Body: Mahogany, Maple, Basswood
- Neck: Mahogany. Maple
- Fretboard: Ebony, Rosewood

Hardware
- Bridge: Floyd Rose tremolo, string thru
- Pickup(s): 2 EMG, Seymour Duncan, Dimarzio

Colors available
- Black, Black with outlines, Rust, Explosion, Slime Bumblebee, Rebel, Metallic Red, Metallic White, Metallic Black, Flametop, Camouflage, Skulls, Shards, Bio Mech, Lone Star, Cemetery Gates and Lightning

The Dean Razorback is an electric guitar made by Dean Guitars. It is a variation of the Dean ML, and was designed by Dimebag Darrell, guitarist for the bands Pantera and Damageplan. The Razorback was at first a USA only model, but was subsequently sold as an import model.

== Models ==
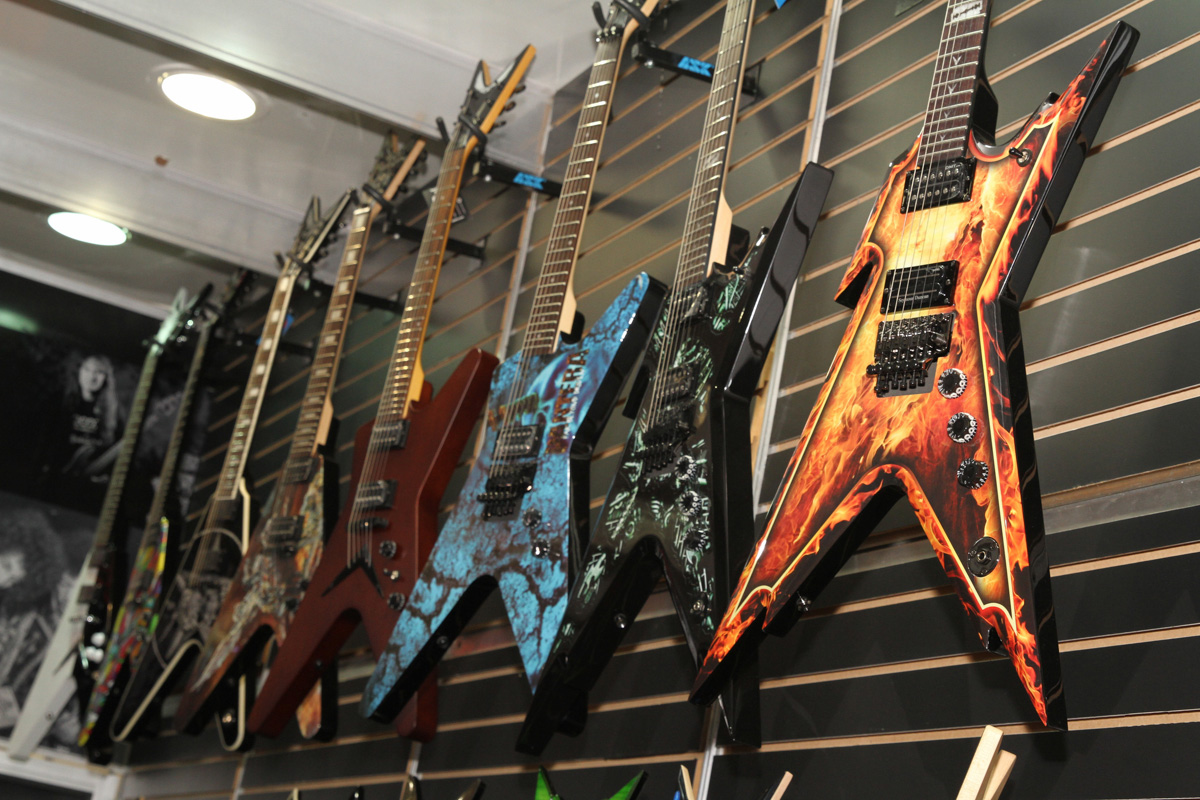
Some customized Razorback models, at right

The Dean Razorback V consists of a standard "ML' shape, with the signature points of the Razorback on each of its legs; the Razorback also has an unusual forked headstock, as with the rest of the Razorback range of Dean guitars.

Abbott asked that a special Razorback should be made in the style of Eddie Van Halen's "Frankenstrat" guitar; this was done, but the standard black, white and red Van Halen style guitar has remained in the company's museum at their headquarters in the US, while the yellow design was given to Van Halen.

In 2007 three new designs were added. The Razorback DB has a lower specification and price, with Dean pickups instead of the EMG or Seymour Duncan and DiMarzio on the Razorback. It does not have a tremolo; it has a bolt-on neck construction instead of the set-in construction of the Razorback, and is not made of mahogany as used in the rest of the range. The Razorback 255 has a 25.5 scale length neck with 24 frets and is designed for easier access to the higher notes. The Razorback 7 has seven strings, normally tuned B E A D G B E, instead of the standard six used on most other guitars. The Razorback has a double edged razor, similar to one worn by Abbott on a necklace, on the twelfth fret of the neck.

On January 19, 2008 three more Razorback designs were announced, one in tribute to the Pantera song Cemetery Gates. Written across the body of the guitar are the words from the chorus: "will unlock my door, and pass the cemetery gates". Another was the 10,000th Commemorative Razorback, with a diamond-plated steel finish. The third was a left-handed version of the Razorback Explosion.

In 2021 Dimebag's estate headed by his girlfriend Rita Haney sued Dean Guitars for a breach of contract relating to royalties owed in relation to the production of the Razorback models, as a result all production of the Razorback and Dimebag related signatures ceased and the company no longer lists Darrell as an endorsee, as of 2024 Razorback guitars can usually only be found by private sellers online.

== Players ==
Razorback players include Black Label Society guitarist Zakk Wylde, whose Razorback has the 'bullseye' finish used on his Gibson Les Paul, "Flying V" and Epiphone Les Paul guitars. Wylde also uses a Dean Split Tail with this design, a cross between the standard Gibson SG and "Flying V" shapes used by other companies.

Matt Heafy of Trivium played a white and gold U.S.-made custom Razorback, which was subsequently made as a limited edition import model, with approximately 24–48.

Other players have included Vince Minogue of Wireless Soul, Glen Alvelais, Eddie Van Halen, Alex Nuñez of Black Tide, Edsel Dope, and Jonas Kjellgren.

Abbott never used the guitar onstage, as it was released by Dean posthumously, but had played it in a few recorded videos.

== See also ==
- Dean Razorback V
- Dean ML
- Dean V
- Dean Z
