= Dean Razorback V =

Electric guitar model

- Manufacturer: Dean Guitars
- Period: 2007—2012 Discontinued

Construction
- Body type: Solid
- Neck joint: Set

Woods
- Body: Mahogany, Maple
- Neck: Mahogany
- Fretboard: Ebony, Rosewood

Hardware
- Bridge: Floyd Rose (Tremolo)
- Pickup: 2 EMG/Seymour Duncan/Dimarzio Humbuckers

The Razorback V is an electric guitar designed by Dimebag Darrell shortly before his death in December 2004. It is a more aggressive looking version of the Dean V, and similar to the Dean Razorback. Corey Beaulieu of Trivium is known for using this guitar It is the more pointy version of the Dean Guitar headstock and the body is an enlarged reversed image of the head. There is also a bass guitar version of the Razorback V shape.

The Razorback V Standard (STD) is offered in two finish options and were only produced for one year 2007 as an import model. They were made in N.Korea at the UnSung factory.

Classic Black, Metallic Red,

The Razorback V was offered in 5 finish options and were also only produced for one year 2007. They were produced in the same Korean factory as the Standard models and also offered as USA models with choice of pickups and other craftsmanship and hardware options that were not available on the import model.

Two Tone Black w/ Red Bevels, Two Tone Black w/ Green Bevels, Two Tone Silver Blast ( Not mentioned in catalog 2007) Two Tone Metallic-White w/ Black Bevels. Two Tone Red w/ Black Bevels (not mentioned in the 2007 catalog)

The Razorback V 255 has a longer scale length neck & 24 frets, that extra length is designed to appeal to guitarists that like down-tuned riffing. This model strayed away from Dime's original design. This model is offered in 5 finishes as an import and 6 finish options as a USA model and came with form fitted V hardshell case. These were produced from 2007-2012 and then discontinued but from 2010 to 2012 the only finish option offered was the Explosion Graphic.

Two Tone Silver Blast (TTSB), Two Tone Yellow Bevels, Explosion Graphic, Blades Graphic, Two Tone Red with Black Bevels (not mentioned in catalogs), Skullz (USA ONLY), Limited Edition - Metallic-Explosion Finish (USA ONLY)

== Corey Beaulieu ==
Corey Beaulieu, one of the guitarists in Trivium, was one of the first guitarists to use the Dean Dime Razorback V. He used to use the USA Razorback V Explosion, USA Razorback V Red with Black Bevels, the USA made Razorback V with the Skull graphics, USA Blood Angel V Razorback, and his own signature model, the CBV 1122, a drastic variation on the original design. Corey Beaulieu sported the first ever made red Razorback V. Corey no longer plays Dean. He changed to Jackson Guitars when Matt Heafy moved on to Gibson. He now plays a Jackson V and a Jackson Randy Rhoads V. Matt Heafy plays a Gibson Les Paul Custom.

== Notable players ==
- Corey Beaulieu (Trivium)
- Matt Heafy (Trivium)
- Alex Nuñez (Black Tide)
- Beefcake the Mighty (Gwar)
- Virus
- Kerry King (Slayer)

== See also ==
- Dean V
- Dean ML
- Dean Razorback
- Flying V
