= Soltero =

Soltero (Spanish "bachelor") may refer to

== People ==
- Soltero (musician), the musical project of radio producer Tim Howard
- Victor Soltero (born 1938), American politician from Arizona
- Gonzalo Soltero, Mexican author
- Susan Soltero (born 1961), Puerto Rican weather forecaster
- Javier Soltero (born 1974), Puerto Rican entrepreneur

== Film and TV ==
- El soltero, 1977 film by Carlos Borcosque Jr.
- Soltero, 1984 film with Jay Ilagan

== Other ==
- Dean Soltero, a guitar manufactured by Dean Guitars

== See also ==
- Solero (disambiguation)
