= ESP LTD TA-200 =

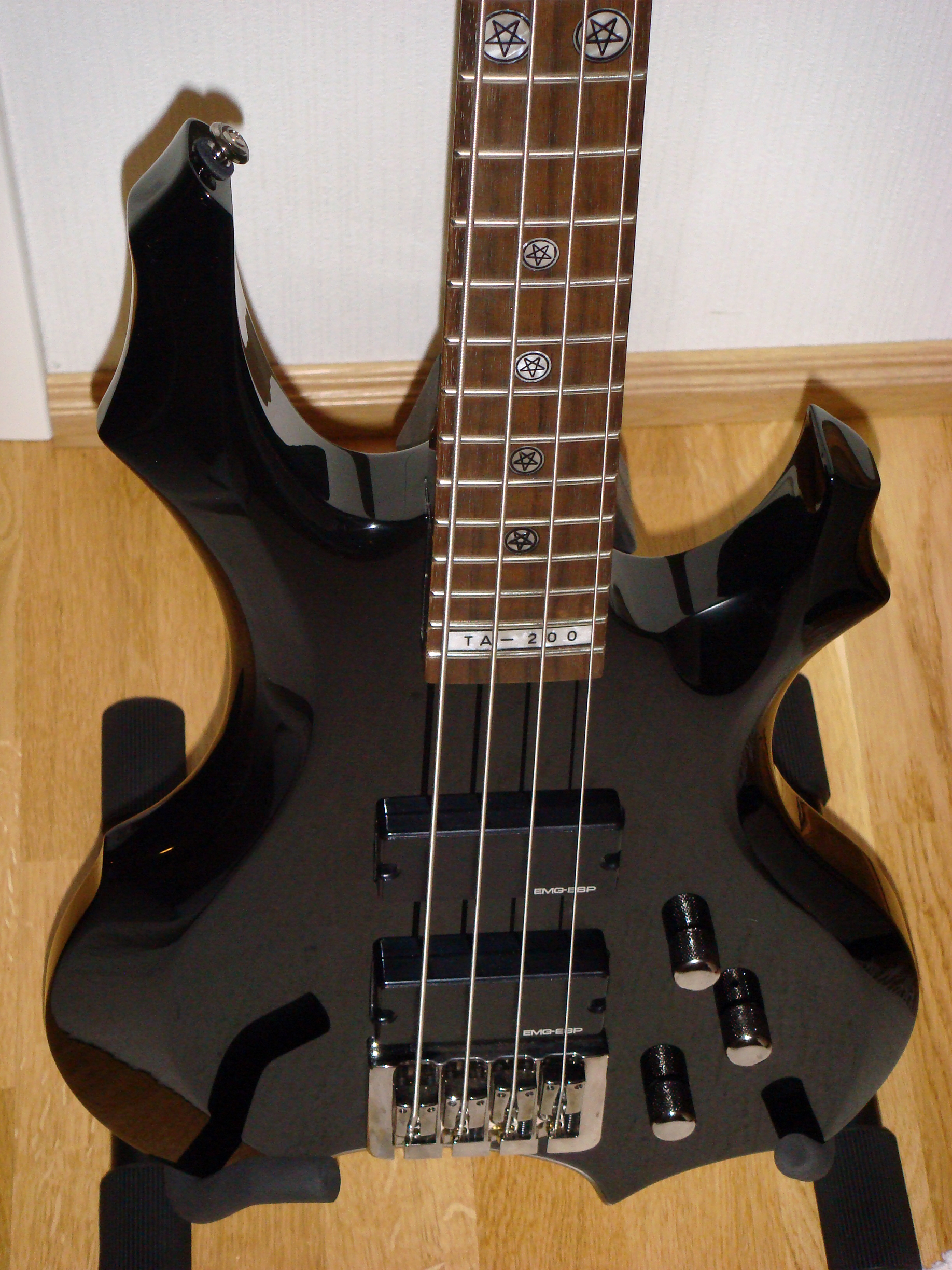
- Manufacturer: ESP
- Period: 2003–

Construction
- Body type: Solid
- Neck joint: Bolt-On

Woods
- Body: Basswood
- Neck: Maple
- Fretboard: Rosewood

Hardware
- Bridge: ESP BB-604
- Pickup: 2 EMG-ESP LHB-4

Colors available
- Black

ESP LTD TA-200 is an electric bass model distributed by ESP. It is the mass-produced version of the custom signature model ESP Tom Araya, endorsed and used by Tom Araya of Slayer.

The four-string bass guitar features passive humbucker pickups jointly designed and produced by ESP and EMG and a fixed bridge. Electronics are controlled by master volume, master tone and pickup balance knobs. Pentagram inlays decorate the rosewood fretboard.

== See also ==
- ESP Tom Araya
