= DBZ =

DBZ may refer to:

- dBZ (meteorology), decibels of Z, a meteorological measure of equivalent reflectivity (Z) of a radar signal
- dB(Z), zero-weighted decibel
- Dean Zelinsky (born 1957), American guitar designer and founder of DBZ Guitars
- Dragon Ball Z, the anime adaptation of the second portion of the Dragon Ball manga
- Dolderbahn, a rack railway in the city of Zürich, Switzerland
- Division by zero, a term used in mathematics if the divisor (denominator) is zero
