= Dean Zelinsky =

American musical artist

- Born: Dean Barrett Zelinsky; February 20, 1957 (age 69)
- Other names: Dean Z. Dean B. Zelinsky; DBZ
- Occupation: CEO of Dean Zelinsky Private Label
- Years active: 1976–present
- Known for: Dean Guitars; DBZ Guitars; Dean Zelinsky Private Label
- Website: Deanzelinsky.com

Dean B. Zelinsky (born February 20, 1957), also known as Dean Z, Dean Barrett Zelinsky or DBZ, is an American guitar luthier who founded Dean Guitars in 1977 and DBZ Guitars in 2008 and today owns Dean Zelinsky Private Label started in 2012.

== Early years ==
Zelinsky was the second of three boys born to Robert and Sylvia Zelinsky in Chicago, IL. Robert was a successful executive and business owner, whose company designed and manufactured custom fasteners; some of which wound up in early United States space program rockets. Dean began tinkering with electronics early on in his childhood; he was taking radios apart to see what made them work & reassembling them at age eight. When Dean was 12 years old, his father died in a plane crash while piloting his own twin-engine plane. His widow raised three boys, Dean, Glenn, and Roger in the wake of this tragedy.

== History ==
Dean's guitars have been played by various artists: Dimebag Darrell, Michael Schenker, Helloween, Kansas, Leslie West, Glenn Dean (Motor City Bad Boys), The Cars, Heart, The Doobie Brothers, Jefferson Starship, Dave Mason, Triumph, Iron Maiden, Sammy Hagar, Def Leppard, Nils Lofgren, Larry Crane (John Mellencamp Band), ZZ Top and Karl Sanders of Nile. Many others can be seen playing Dean’s guitar designs in photographs, on the Internet, in music videos, and in concerts. Dean’s guitar designs have been featured on the Howard Stern Radio Show, on TV at the Grammys Awards show, in books including a recent book by James Bond novelist Raymond Benson, and in countless magazine articles spanning over 33 years.

Anheuser-Busch once commissioned Dean (DBZ) to design and make a limited set of specially shaped Budweiser and Busch Beer guitars used in promotions across North America.

Dean Zelinsky created the spinning fur guitars for the "Legs" video from ZZ Top. Blender.com lists the "Spinning Furs" along with the ML as part of "The 28 Most Recognizable Guitars".

In 2008, Dean Zelinsky, founder of Dean Guitars, parted ways with Dean Corporate. He then founded DBZ Guitars in partnership with Diamond Amplification, and subsequently left in 2012. DBZ Guitars became Diamond Guitars after his departure.

== Today ==
Dean Zelinsky currently owns and operates Dean Zelinsky Private Label Brand Guitars under the corporate name The Real Dean LLC.

== Influences ==
When the Rolling Stones, The Beatles, and Johnny Winter came upon the music scene, Dean’s attention quickly turned to Rock & Roll and became interested in guitars. He began playing electric guitar and learned what he liked and what he did not like. More importantly, while some would have paid anything to get their hands on a vintage Gibson Flying V, Dean not only had one in-hand, but he also sawed it in two, right down the middle to start measuring and setting his sights on making a better instrument. As bands became more avant-garde in the 1970s, it was Dean’s opinion that the design of the guitars they were playing was not keeping pace with the times.

While attending high school in Highland Park IL, Dean began offering his services to local music shops and to Chicago area guitar players for repairs, custom paint jobs and soon gained a reputation among local storeowners as someone to turn to for services that went beyond what most of them could offer in-house. It was because of this that Dean learned to actually sell guitars. It was actually “a first” in the history of his high school that a senior left school for the day to complete their student work program at their own company; a disagreement over receiving credit for this was something that almost drove Dean to leave prior to graduating. However, he earned his diploma.

== Starting Up ==
Having had several years of repairing and re-building guitars under his belt, Dean set out to create a guitar that would sound better and equally important, play better than what he had experienced testing all the brands he could get his hands on in the repair business. In the 1970s Gibson Guitars had a factory in Kalamazoo Michigan, where they used to provide tours for people. Dean took one such tour to learn what machinery one would need in order to accomplish setting up a production run of their own designs. Unimportant to the design of guitars, he later prevaricated his actions. After two trips to the Kalamazoo factory, this quick study yielded a plan to seek out similar equipment to start his own company.

During this time, Dean’s best friend (Mathew Lynn) was battling cancer, and although he did not live to see the success that Dean would soon attain, Mathew was honored posthumously. The sadness of losing his best friend turned into a bittersweet tribute to a young man who fought cancer valiantly. What began as a tribute to his fallen friend was a guitar that in 1977, took off and is still revered today; known as the Dean ML, taking its name from Dean’s fallen childhood friend’s initials.

Dean set up his first manufacturing shops in the Chicago area, with all work being closely supervised personally by him on a daily basis. Getting people to notice the new designs was easy, and as his other designs, including the V, Z, and Cadillac started being played by the top touring bands of the day, the reputation of Dean was cemented and quickly grew.

== Marketing 101 ==
While on an airplane once, Dean saw an advertisement in a magazine for a liquor company featuring a beautiful woman standing in water in a provocative pose holding a drink similar to the way Playboy posed models. This led to an idea that changed the way guitars were marketed. Dean created his own ads that caused a wave of controversy. Guitar ads for Dean’s company were featuring bikini-clad models wearing guitars. His early music magazine print ads and trade show marketing used female models from Playboy, and it was this marketing that filled NAMM Show event aisles with merchants seeking to get a better look at the guitars (and models) that were quickly becoming the talk of the industry. When Dean was warned by the trade show officials at one show that he had better tone it down in order to help keep the aisles clear, he knew he was on to something.

Prior to Dean starting Dean Guitars, most guitar manufacturing figures kept a low public profile. With the possible exception of Leo Fender, nobody outside the industry knew their names. Dean broke this mold with his designs and marketing, leading People Magazine to do a feature story on Mr. Zelinsky when he was only 21 years old. Rather than just a young man who happened to make guitars for a living, he had become a celebrity in his own right. In fact, Kerry Livgren of the rock band Kansas (Dust in the Wind, Carry on Wayward Son), proclaimed at one time that Dean was the first guitar maker to achieve Rock Star status. Sales and endorsers increased.

== Globalization ==
In the mid 1980s Guitar manufacturers were seeking to meet an ever-increasing demand for musical instruments. This led to major manufacturers like Gibson and Fender as well as others to begin importing guitars from the Orient. Dean was determined to keep production in the U.S.A. in order to maintain quality; at least until he could assure that the (import) quality was as good as he knew he could deliver. While he did import for a time, he wound up selling the company in 1986 to take some time off to raise a young family of his own, with his wife, Playboy Playmate - Suzi Schott (Zelinsky).

== Dean re-enters the guitar business ==
In February 2000 Dean Zelinsky returned to Dean Guitars on a consultant basis primarily to oversee Marketing, USA production and Artist Relations. Zelinsky also designed new models for the Dean Guitars line up. Zelinsky used his past connections to bring top artists to the company including Dimebag Darrell, Michael Schenker, Leslie West and Dave Mustaine...all who received artist models with the company. In May 2008, Zelinsky left the company over a contract dispute. In August 2008 Zelinsky founded his new company DBZ Guitars. He remained CEO until he left, to form yet another company - Dean Zelinsky Private Label.

Dean had been designing custom entertainment centers and high-end furniture under the business name of Dean Barrett for clientele that ranged from CEO’s on Chicago’s North Shore, to superstars like Michael Jordan from the Chicago Bulls. Dean was lured back into the music industry, taking on the challenge of helping to re-build the brand he started nearly two decades earlier when the offer came. Dean built up the business with his team of Internet professionals.

Dean also did some mentoring, which was the case when he spent some time at an in-store event in Dallas, TX with a young guitar player that appeared asking for his autograph. Darrell Abbott (Dimebag Darrell from Pantera, DamagePlan) from Arlington, TX had won a Dean ML Guitar when he was a teenager, but the chance encounter between Dimebag and Dean Zelinsky would forge a lifelong friendship that started back in the 80’s and picked up in 2004 when Dean signed Dimebag to an endorsement deal. Dean was supposed to meet up with Darrell in December 2004 to unveil the guitar they worked on together but unfortunately, their plans were cut short on December 8, 2004 minutes after Dime took to the stage at the Alrosa Villa club in Columbus, OH when a crazed fan shot him. This tragedy had a profound effect on the music world, as well as on some of the greatest guitar players in the world including longtime friends of Darrell’s, Eddie Van Halen, and Zakk Wylde, and also on Dean. Dean has written extensively about his sense of loss based on the events surrounding Dime’s passing. Dean's son, Tyler, coincidentally had conducted the last video interview with Dimebag just weeks before his untimely demise. It has been featured on the Internet and also excerpts were licensed by VH1 for a special on Rock Wives. The video has also been published in Guitar World Magazine.

== Guitars designed by Dean Zelinsky ==
=== Dean Guitars ===
- Dean ML
- Dean V
- Dean Z
- Dean Cadillac
- Dean Soltero
- Dean Evo
- Dean HardTail
- Dean SplitTail
- Dean Sledgehammer Bass

=== DBZ Guitars ===
- DBZ Barchetta
- DBZ Bird of Prey
- DBZ Bolero
- DBZ Bolero "Croc Skin"
- DBZ Cavallo
- DBZ Cavallo "Peacemaker"
- DBZ Hailfire
- DBZ Halcyon
- DBZ Imperial
- DBZ Imperial Aliento
- DBZ Mondial
- DBZ Royale
- DBZ Tuscan
- DBZ Venom
- DBZ Venom "Snake Skin"
- DBZ Verona

=== Dean Zelinsky Private Label Guitars ===
- Dean Zelinsky Private Label Tagliare
- Dean Zelinsky Private Label StrettaVita
- Dean Zelinsky Private Label Dellatera
- Dean Zelinsky Private Label Zenyatta
- Dean Zelinsky Private Label LaVoce
- Dean Zelinsky Private Label Paloma Acoustic
- Dean Zelinsky Private Label Salón Parlor Acoustic
- Dean Zelinsky Private Label Mule Bass
