= ESP Tom Araya =

ESP produces several bass guitar models based on the custom models of Tom Araya, the bassist for thrash metal band Slayer.

Current ESP models:

- ESP Tom Araya
- ESP LTD TA-600
- ESP LTD TA-200

== See also ==
- Slayer
