= Solero =

Solero may refer to:

- Solero (ice cream), an ice cream brand
- Solero, Piedmont, a comune (municipality) in the province of Alessandria in the Italian region Piedmont

== See also ==
- Soltero (disambiguation)
- Soulero (disambiguation)
