= EMG 85 =

Electric guitar pickup by EMG, Inc

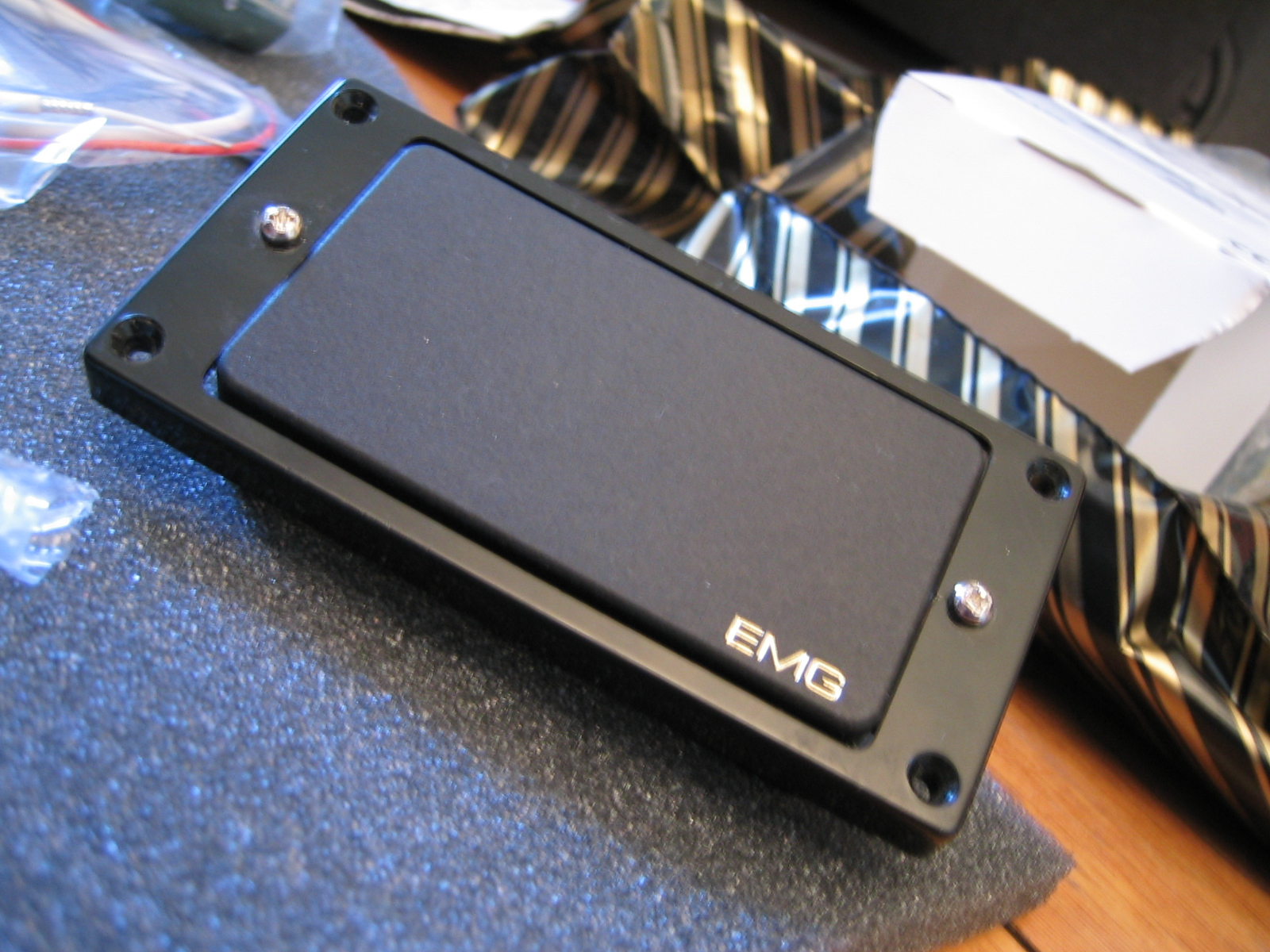
- Manufacturer: EMG, Inc.
- Period: 1979–present
- Type: Active humbucker
- Magnet type: Alnico 5

Output specifications
- Voltage (RMS), V: 3.10
- Voltage (peak), V: 4.50
- Noise, dBV: -101
- Impedance, kΩ: 10
- Current, µA: 80

Power requirements
- Power source: 9 V battery
- Battery life, hours: 3000

Sonic qualities
- Resonant frequency, Hz: 1870

The EMG 85 is a popular active humbucker guitar pickup manufactured by EMG, Inc. It is paired with the 81 in the Zakk Wylde signature EMG set. It was originally designed to be used in the bridge position but is typically installed in the neck position by modern guitar producers.

The EMG 85 can be recognized by a humbucker form-factor and gold embossed EMG logo.

The EMG 85-7 is the seven string version of the 85.

== History and design ==
The EMG 85 changed the previous EMG 58 pickup in the EMG product lineup as a popular rhythm pickup. Technologically, EMG 85 is an active humbucker with bar-shaped Alnico 5 magnet. The bar-shaped magnet affects strings uniformly, without irregularities known in more traditional design with separate pole pieces. Alnico 5 magnets also contribute to a warmer tone than that normally associated with ceramic magnets, which is why some players often use the 85 in the bridge, as opposed to the 81.

As the EMG 85 is an active humbucker, its two coils are not just connected in series or parallel with single output. Instead, they have two separate outputs and are summed electronically in the preamp. However, such sealed solution makes it impossible to do coil taps or coil splits. The EMG 89 is a recommended pickup with a coil tap/split option.

As is the case with most other modern EMG pickups, the EMG 85 has a 3-wire quik-connect output, which consists of a 3-pin male connector on the pickup body and a 3-wire cable to connect it. The easy wire color code scheme that is the same for all EMG products simplifies soldering and installation.
