= Dean Cadillac =

1977-present electric guitar by Dean Guitars

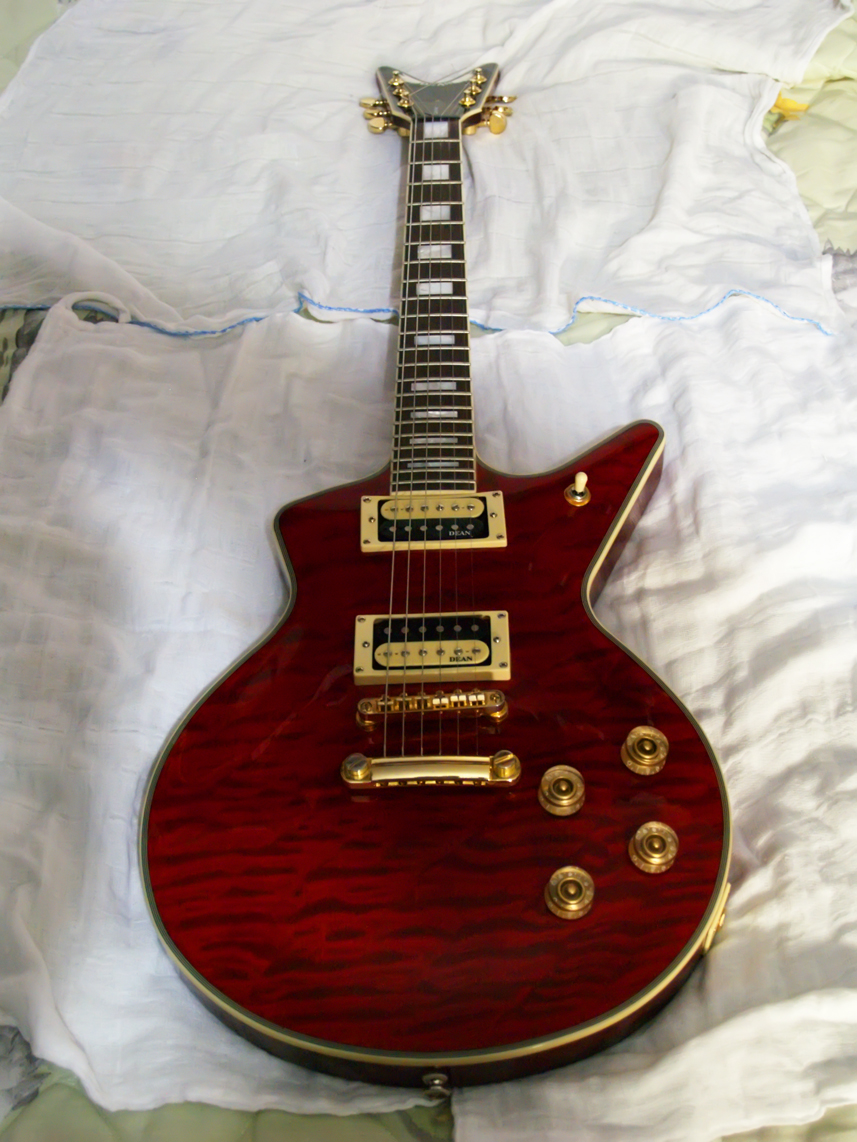
- A Dean Cadillac Select
- Manufacturer: Dean Guitars
- Period: 1977 — present

Construction
- Body type: Solid
- Neck joint: Set-in
- Scale: 24.75"

Woods
- Body: Mahogany (some models feature maple tops)
- Neck: Mahogany
- Fretboard: Ebony, rosewood (22 frets)

Hardware
- Bridge: Usually hardtail (Tune-O-Matic)
- Pickup(s): 2 or 3 humbuckers (DiMarzio, Seymour Duncan, EMG, DMT)

Colors available
- Various

Originally called E'Lite, the Dean Cadillac is a guitar designed and created by Dean Guitars. It has a resemblance to the Dean ML, the Gibson Les Paul and the Gibson Explorer. It was released alongside the Dean ML, V and Z. Glen Drover of the band Megadeth is known for using this guitar, as well as Rob Barrett of Cannibal Corpse, Rich Williams and Kerry Livgren of Kansas from 1979 to 1983, John McFee of The Doobie Brothers, Pig Benis a.k.a. Jack Kilcoyne of Mushroomhead, Sascha Gerstner of Helloween and Jesse Penny of Steel Mistress. Also Eric Peterson from Testament used one of this guitar model in live performances.

The Dean Cadillac shape was also available as a bass guitar.

== 25th Anniversary model ==
The 25th Anniversary model of the Dean Cadillac was released in 2002, in a limited quantity of 100 guitars. The model had a flame-maple top, abalone fingerboard inlays, 24-karat gold plated hardware and a 25th Anniversary emblem on the headstock. The model claimed to be of the same quality that was originally reserved for Dean's top artist customers; the suggested retail price was below $3,000.

== See also ==
- Dean Soltero
