= Diamond Guitars =

American guitar manufacturer

- Formerly: DBZ Guitars, DBZ Diamond
- Type: Privately held company
- Industry: Musical instrument
- Founded: 1996; 30 years ago
- Founder: Dean Zelinsky, Jeff Diamant, Terry Martin
- Headquarters: Muncie, Indiana, United States
- Area served: Worldwide
- Products: Electric guitars, amplifiers, pickups
- Owner: Jason Struble
- Divisions: Diamond Amplification
- Website: diamondguitars.com

Diamond Guitars is an American guitar manufacturer owned and operated by Mountain High Holdings LLC, Jason Struble, the president and CEO, along with Jeff Diamant of Diamond Amplification.

The company has gone by 3 names throughout its history (DBZ, DBZ/Diamond, Diamond) and was purchased and moved from Houston, TX to Muncie, Indiana in late 2018. The DBZ brand was rebranded in 2013 into Diamond Guitars.

== History ==
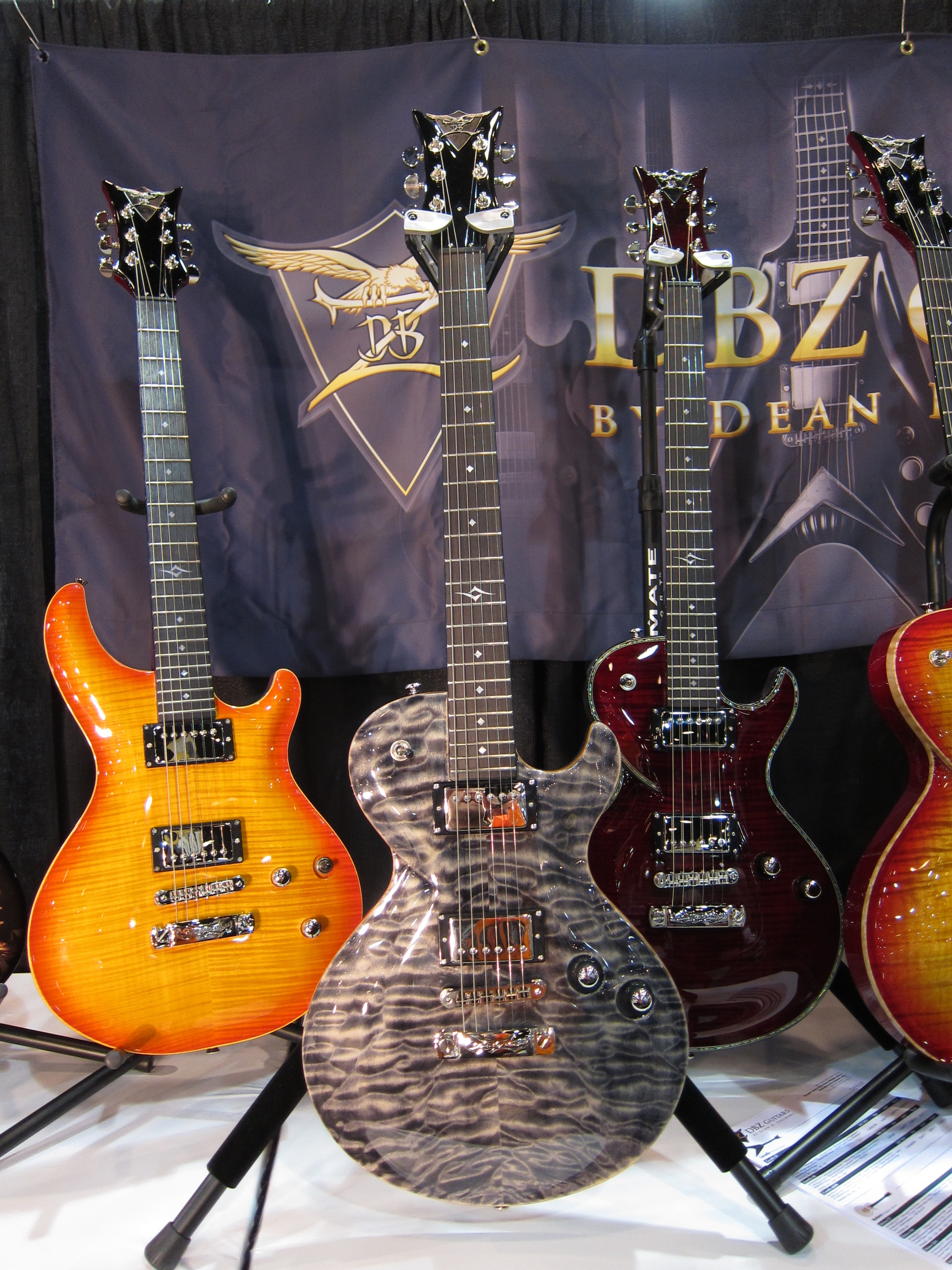
DBZ Guitars exhibited at the 2010 Summer NAMM Show in Nashville, Tennessee

On August 26, 2008, Dean Zelinsky announced the launch of his new company, DBZ Guitars, in partnership with Diamond Amplification owner Jeff Diamant, and Diamant's Texas partner, Terry Martin.

On January 9, 2009, DBZ Guitars' founders announced the official launch of their debut website in order to premier their new electric and acoustic guitar models.

Rumors about Zelinsky leaving the DBZ Guitars company began circulating in January 2012. On February 9, 2012, a lawsuit was filed by DBZ Guitars against Zelinsky for a breach of fiduciary duties.

On April 19, 2012, it was reported that Zelinsky was founding a new company, "Dean Zelinsky Private Label Guitars", further signaling his shift away from the DBZ company.

At some point between Zelinsky's departure in 2012 and the following NAMM show in 2013, the company was rebranded to DBZ/Diamond. This shift in branding coincided with new headstock designs and models.

By December 2014, the company dropped DBZ from their branding and began going solely by the Diamond moniker.

== Guitars ==
The company has produced a full line of electric and acoustic guitars, throughout its history.

When the company was initially founded, they sold both USA-made models, as well as imports such as their Japanese-made Infinity lineup, and Chinese-made Barchetta and Venom models. This era of manufacturing lasted until at least 2011, when they were still releasing models from "DBZ USA Custom Shop Guitars".

In 2013, the manufacturing of many models was moved to South Korean company World Musical Instrument Co, the same factory where many other manufacturers such as BC Rich, Gretsch, Ibanez, PRS, and Schecter have had guitar models made throughout their history. This short-lived partnership coincided with the transition period between the company rebranding from DBZ to Diamond, resulting in a limited run of headstocks bearing both the DBZ and Diamond branding.

At some point after the rebranding to Diamond, manufacturing was shifted to Indonesia.
