= EMG 81 =

Electric guitar pickup by EMG, Inc

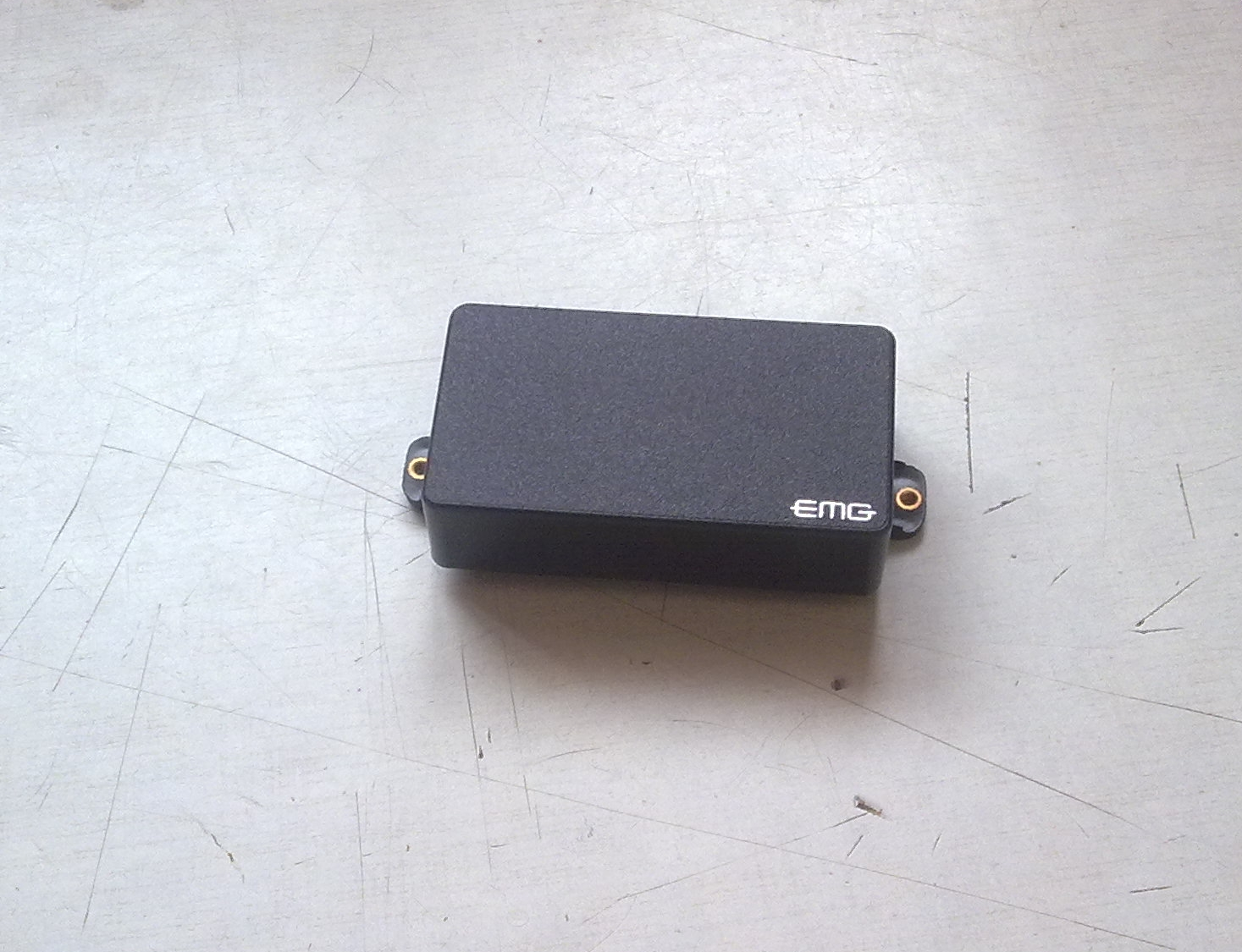
- Manufacturer: EMG, Inc.
- Period: 1979–present
- Type: Active humbucker
- Magnet type: Ceramic magnet

Output specifications
- Voltage (RMS), V: 3.00
- Voltage (peak), V: 4.50
- Noise, dBV: -100
- Impedance, kΩ: 10
- Current, µA: 80

Power requirements
- Power source: 9 V battery
- Battery life, hours: 3000

Sonic qualities
- Resonant frequency, Hz: 1630

The EMG 81 is an active humbucker guitar pickup manufactured by EMG, Inc. It is usually considered a lead pickup for use in the bridge position, paired with EMG's 85 as a rhythm pickup in neck position (Zakk Wylde is famous for this configuration). It is not uncommon, however, to see a guitar with two EMG 81s in both bridge and neck positions (for instance, Kirk Hammett's EMG-KH21 pickup sets, which include two EMG 81 pickups for both neck and bridge positions).

The EMG 81 pickup is preferred as a lead pickup because of its high output and smooth control from having a rail magnet. Rail magnets tend to sound smoother through string bends because they have a constant "rail" that runs through the pickup, while typical guitar pickups have polepieces under each string that lose signal strength as the string bends away from the polepiece. The EMG 81 can be recognized by its dark grey humbucker form-factor and a silver embossed EMG logo.

Due its high output, focused mids, consistent tone, tight attack and distinct clarity under heavy distortion, the EMG 81 is used by heavy metal guitar players.

== History and design ==
The EMG-81 was developed in 1979 and released to the market in 1981 (hence the model number). Construction is similar to traditional U-shaped pickups, but there are no separate pole pieces; steel bars (rails) are used instead. The Alnico V magnets of earlier discontinued models have been replaced with ceramic ones. While nominal output is the same as current EMG 85, lower noise ratio gives more gain opportunity.

As most other modern EMG pickups, today's EMG-81 has a Quik-connect output, which is a three-pin header on the pickup which comes with a compatible wiring harness. This allows for a less complicated pickup swap in the future, only requiring the removal of the pickup guard and disconnecting the pickup, as opposed to melting the solder and installing the new pickup.

A few variants of the EMG 81 have also been released, such as the TW and X. The 81TW version features two separate pickups and preamps in a single pickup housing, allowing for single-coil and humbucking tones. The 81-X provides increased headroom giving the voicing an organic and open tone while still maintaining clarity and response.
