= Soulero =

Soulero may refer to:

- Soulero, an album by Eddie Higgins
- "Soulero", a song by Bob James and Richard Evans from the former's album One

== See also ==
- Solero (disambiguation)
