= Sociedad General de Escritores de México =

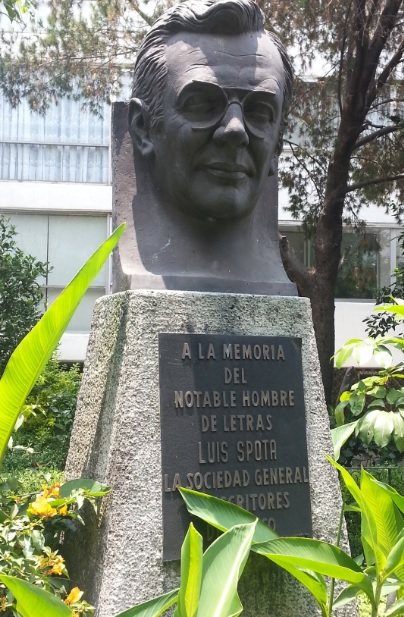
- Bust commemorating the writer Luis Spota, by SOGEM.
- Abbreviation: SOGEM
- Formation: August 1, 1976; 50 years ago
- Type: Society
- Purpose: To protect the copyright of its members, in addition to promoting and disseminating literary production
- Headquarters: Mexico City, Mexico
- Official language: Spanish
- Key people: José Jesús Calzada Gómez - President
- Website: https://www.sogem.org/

The Sociedad General de Escritores de México (SOGEM) (English: General Society of Writers of Mexico) is an association of Mexican writers founded in 1976 with its headquarters in Mexico City, Mexico. It is in charge of protecting the copyright of its members, in addition to promoting and disseminating literary production. It is part of the International Confederation of Societies of Authors and Composers, an organization that brings together the different societies of authors around the world.

The society also operates Mexico's oldest school of creative writing, Escuela de Escritores, graduates of which have achieved more than 250 literary awards. Recognized Mexican writers such as Alberto Chimal, Vicente Leñero, Emilio Carballido, and Gonzalo Soltero have taught in their classrooms.
