= Luna Guitars =

American musical instrument company

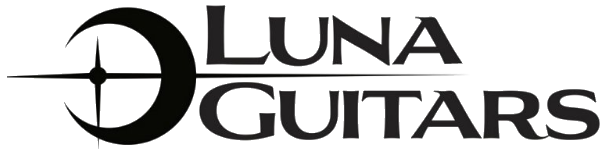
- Type: Subsidiary
- Industry: Musical instrument
- Founded: 2005; 21 years ago
- Headquarters: Tampa, Florida, United States
- Products: Current: Acoustic guitars, bass guitars, mandolins, ukuleles, banjos, cajones, kalimbas
- Parent: Armadillo Enterprises, Inc.
- Website: lunaguitars.com

Luna Guitars, commonly referred to simply as Luna, is a musical instrument company that manufactures string and percussion instruments. Its range of products include steel-string acoustic guitars, mandolins, ukuleles, cajones, kalimbas, and both acoustic and electric bass guitars. It is currently a subsidiary of Armadillo Enterprises, Inc.

== History ==
Luna Guitars was founded in 2005 by Yvonne de Villiers, a stained-glass artist. The company's instruments incorporate decorative elements including henna designs and depictions of a dragon and phoenix. The guitars are built with slimmer necks and lighter bodies.

Luna later expanded its product line to include electric guitars, ukuleles, and bluegrass instruments. Decorative features include laser-etched designs, abalone wave inlays, and landscapes made from tropical woods.

In 2017, Luna introduced a percussion line that included cajons with adjustable snares. In 2022, the company added three kalimbas to the line.

The brand comprises three divisions: Luna Guitars, Luna Ukes, and Luna Percussion. Artists who have endorsed the brand include Rick Springfield and The Warren Brothers.

In June 2026, Luna Guitars' parents company, Armadillo Enterprises, filed for Chapter 11 bankruptcy protection after facing several years of legal trouble regarding selling infringing guitar designs, with the company being ordered to stop selling V and Z instruments. Armadillo claimed that family disputes ultimately caused the decision to file for bankruptcy.
