= Dean Z =

Electric guitar model

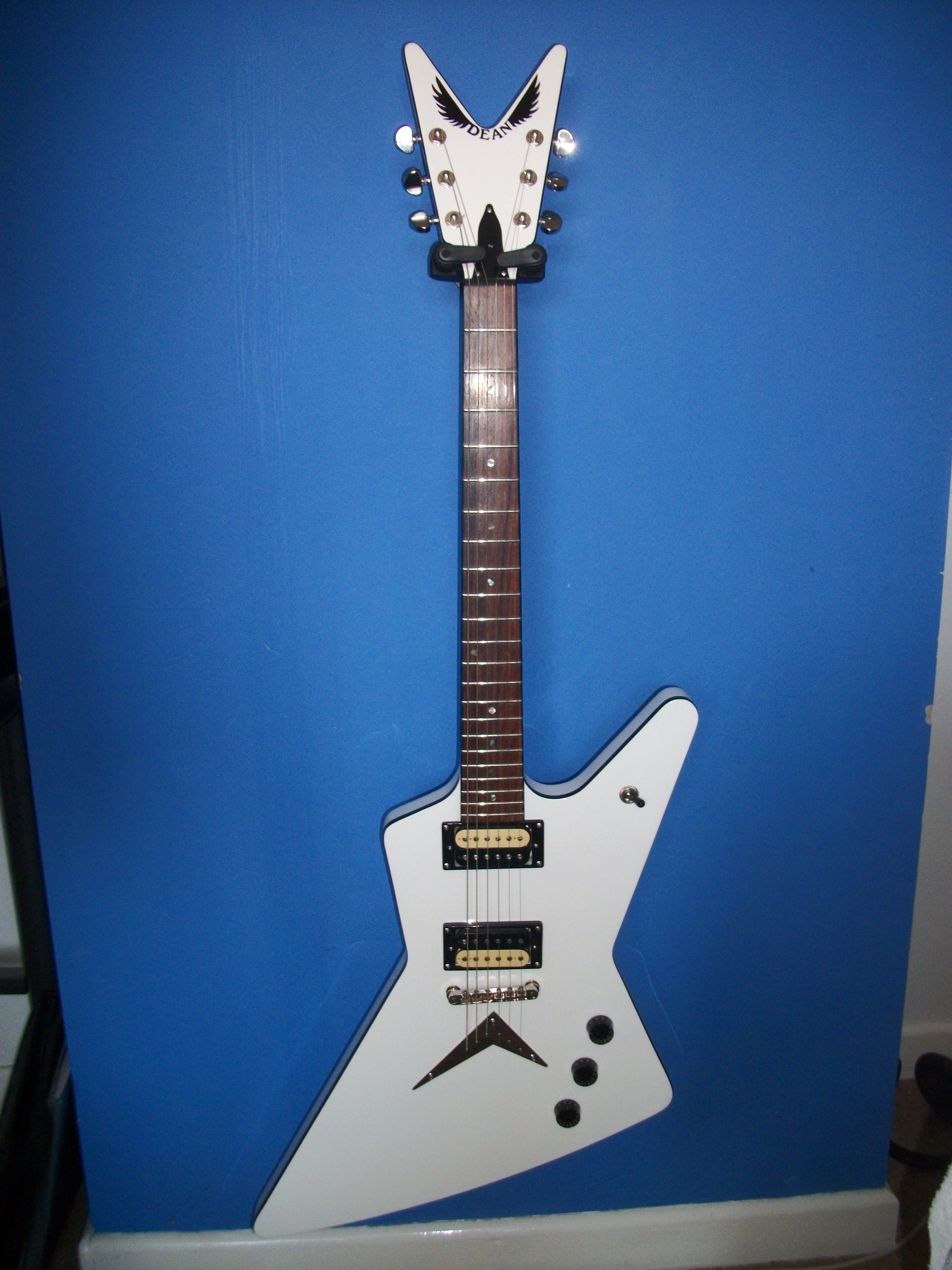
- Manufacturer: Dean Guitars
- Period: 1977–2022, 2025–present

Construction
- Body type: Solid
- Neck joint: Set

Woods
- Body: Mahogany, Maple
- Neck: Mahogany
- Fretboard: Ebony, Rosewood

Hardware
- Bridge: String Thru
- Pickup(s): 2 EMG, Seymour Duncan, DiMarzio

Colors available
- Various

The Dean Z Guitar is an electric guitar made by Dean Guitars starting in 1977 along with its counterparts, the Dean ML, Dean V and Dean Cadillac. It has the recognizable Dean headstock and the V-shaped tailpiece. The body shape is similar to the body design of a Gibson Explorer.

== History ==
The Dean Z, like its counterpart the Dean ML, was designed with the enhancement of tone, sustain and playability in mind. These models have dramatic string angles at the bridge and nut and a string thru body design featuring the original V plate. The added string length created by the exclusive headstock coupled with the original Dean neck design is how the Z achieves its "incredible ease of play".

Dean Guitars' parent company, Armadillo Entrerprises, was ordered to halt sales of the Z in 2022 after legal action was taken against the company by Gibson Guitars. However, in July 2024, the US court of Appeals 5th Circuit Court found in favor of Armadillo's appeal, reversing the prior ruling and sending the case back for retrial. The Appellate Court found that the lower District Court had overstepped its authority in blocking certain evidence from the original trial. As part of the ruling, Dean Guitars will be allowed to resume sales of the Dean Z.

== Construction ==
The Z shape is also available as part of the Baby Series as a scaled-down version. There is also a Z-shaped bass guitar made by Dean.

== Discontinuation ==
In 2022 Gibson successfully sued Dean Guitars over the production of the Z model for patent violations and the model has since been deleted from the Dean model range and Dean website. However, in July 2024, this ruling was overturned by the US Court of Appeals and remanded back for retrial, restoring all rights to sell the Dean model Z to Dean Guitars. However, in March 2025, the court sided with Gibson, ruling that Dean had indeed infringed upon Gibson's trademark, and production and distribution was halted once again.

== See also ==
- Dean Metalman Z
- Lyn Z
