= Dean V =

Electric guitar model

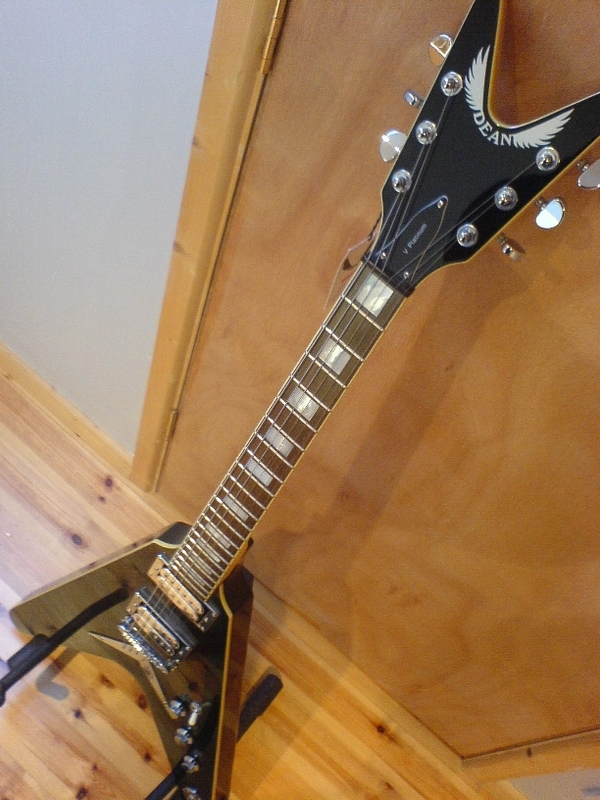
- A Dean V Platinum model
- Manufacturer: Dean Guitars
- Period: 1977–2022, 2025–present

Construction
- Body type: Solid
- Neck joint: Set

Woods
- Body: Mahogany, Maple
- Neck: Mahogany
- Fretboard: Ebony, Rosewood

Hardware
- Bridge: String Thru
- Pickup(s): 2 EMG, Seymour Duncan, Dimarzio, DMT

Colors available
- Various

The Dean V is a model of electric guitar and bass released by Dean Guitars in 1977. It forms part of Dean's classic line of guitars along with the Dean ML, Dean Cadillac and Dean Z. In addition to its body shape, the Dean V is recognisable for its V-shaped headstock and V-shaped tailpiece. Some of the prominent users include Michael Schenker, Michael Amott, Eric Peterson and Karl Sanders.

Dean was ordered to halt sales of the V in 2022 after legal action was taken against the company by Gibson Guitars.

== Michael Schenker ==
Michael Schenker has his own signature model, which has the custom Michael Schenker split black and white design. He previously played Gibson Flying V's and was endorsed by Aria before he came to Dean.

=== Michael Schenker Flame V ===
The Flame V is one of Michael Schenker's signature Dean Models. Only 100 were produced and they have custom pickups and a hardcase included. This uses the Michael Schenker split black and white design, but with flames.

=== Schenker Brothers V ===
Dean released a Schenker Brothers V. It has a custom design, with pictures of both Schenker brothers on it. Only 200 were produced, with custom Schenker "S" plate tailpieces, gold hardware, and ebony fingerboard with custom Mother of Pearl "Schenker Flames" inlays.

== 30th Anniversary V ==
Dean produced the 30th Anniversary V and ML in 2007, marking thirty years since the ML and V were first released. Only 100 will be produced worldwide, with the Dean 30th Anniversary logo printed on the headstock and the pickup covers. They are all signed by Dean Zelinsky and come with a trans-black finish and hardcase.

Dean V 30th. Anniversary
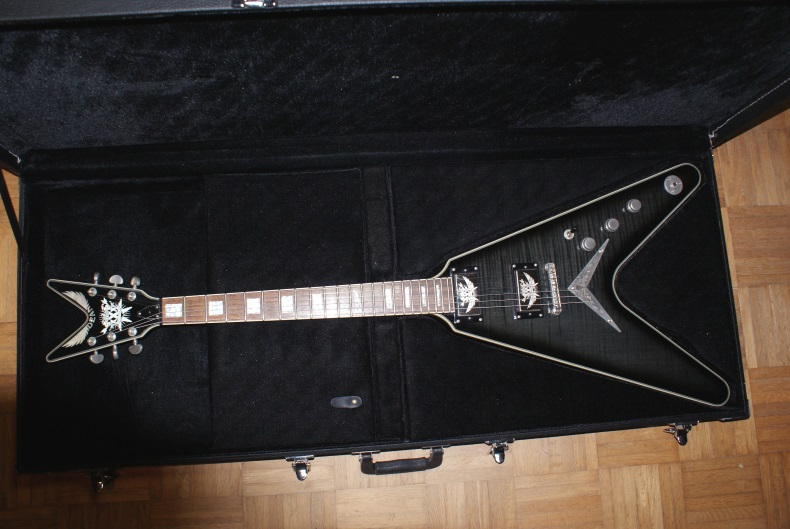
30th. Anniversary in box

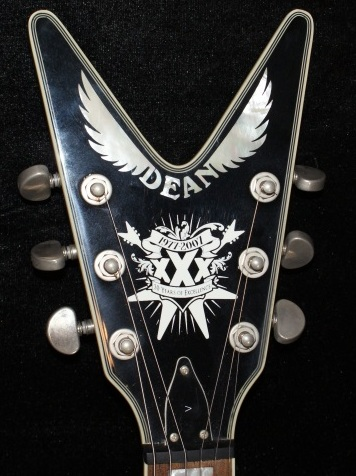
Head

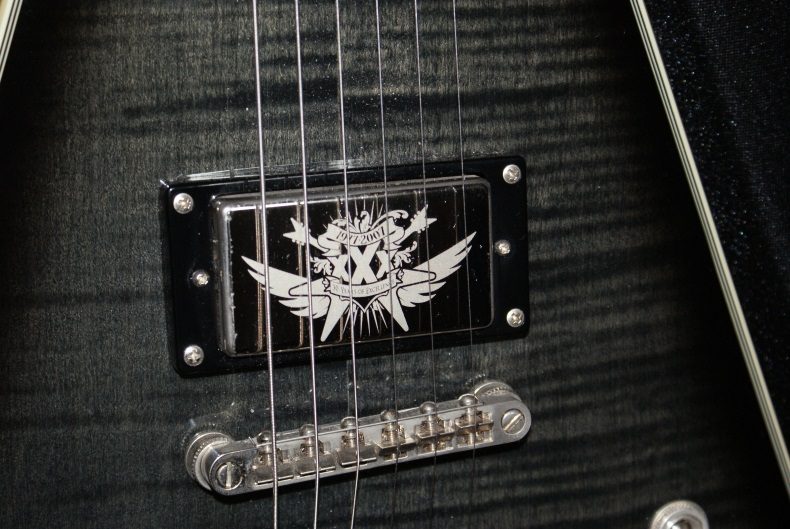
Pickup

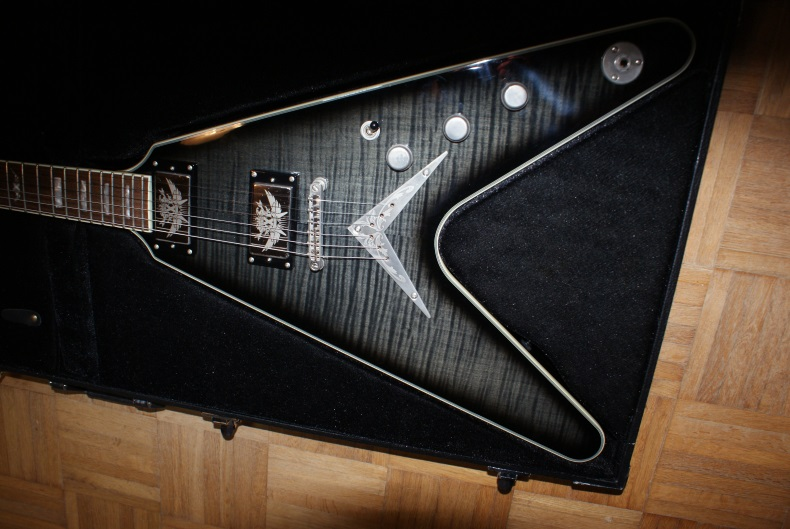
Body

== Other V-shaped Deans ==
Dean also makes a smaller V as part of the Baby Series, a Michael Schenker Baby V, a V-shaped bass guitar and an acoustic version of the V, the V-Coustic.

== Notable users ==
- Michael Schenker
- Rudolf Schenker (Scorpions)
- Marcel "Schmier" Schirmer
- Mike Sifringer
- Michael Amott
- Eric Peterson
- Karl Sanders
- Dave Mustaine

== Gallery ==
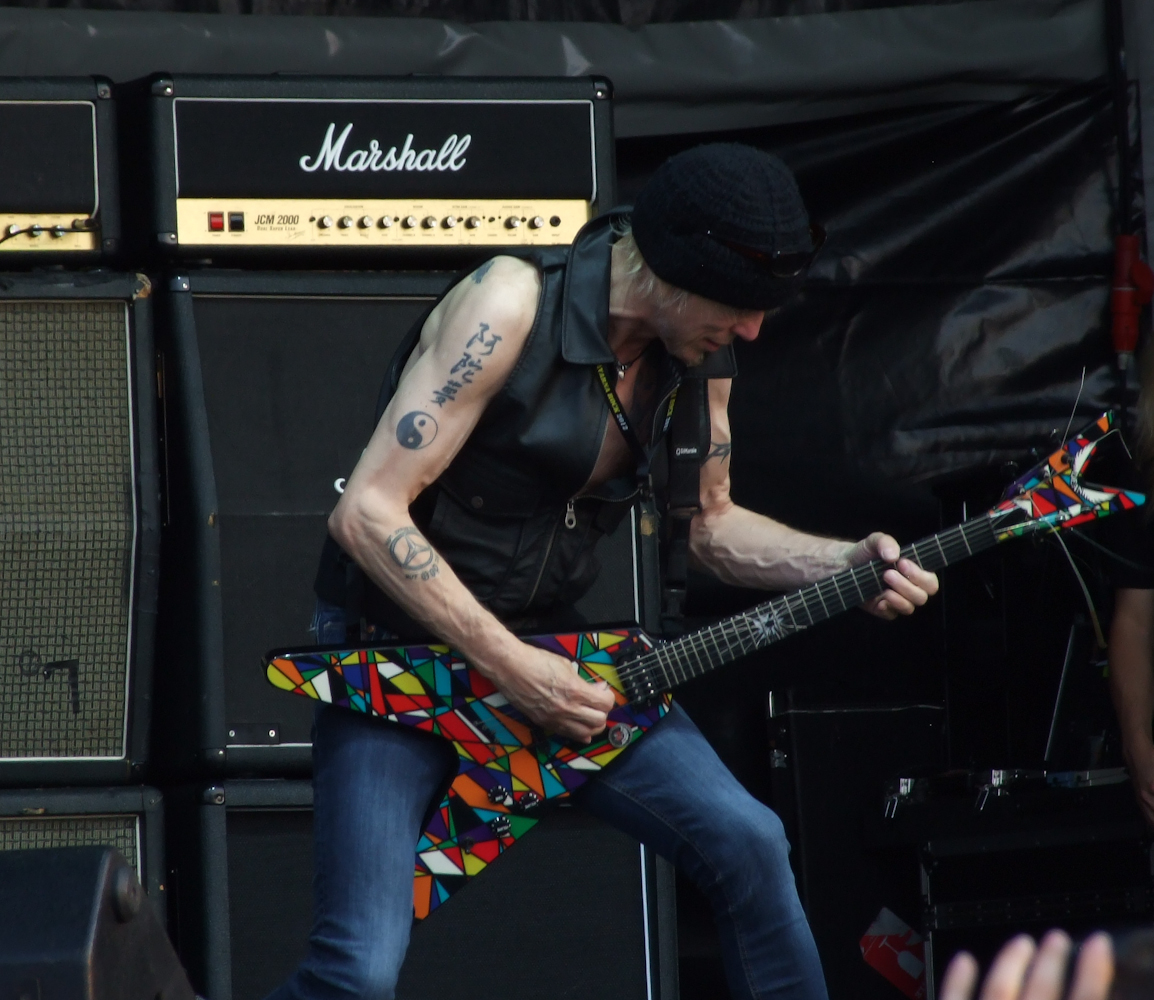
Michael Schenker

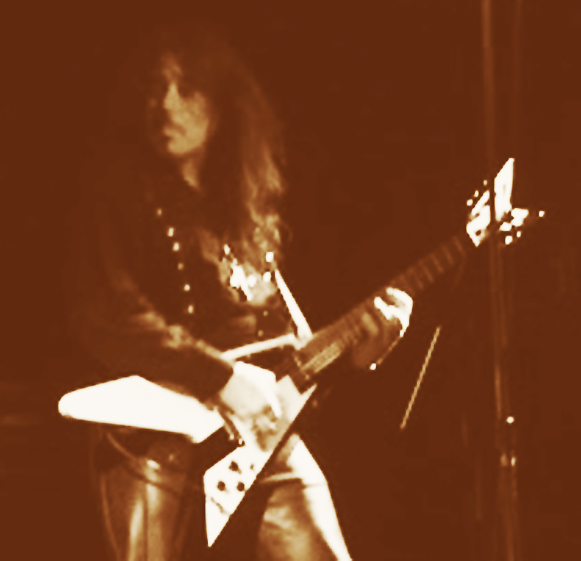
Raven Storm

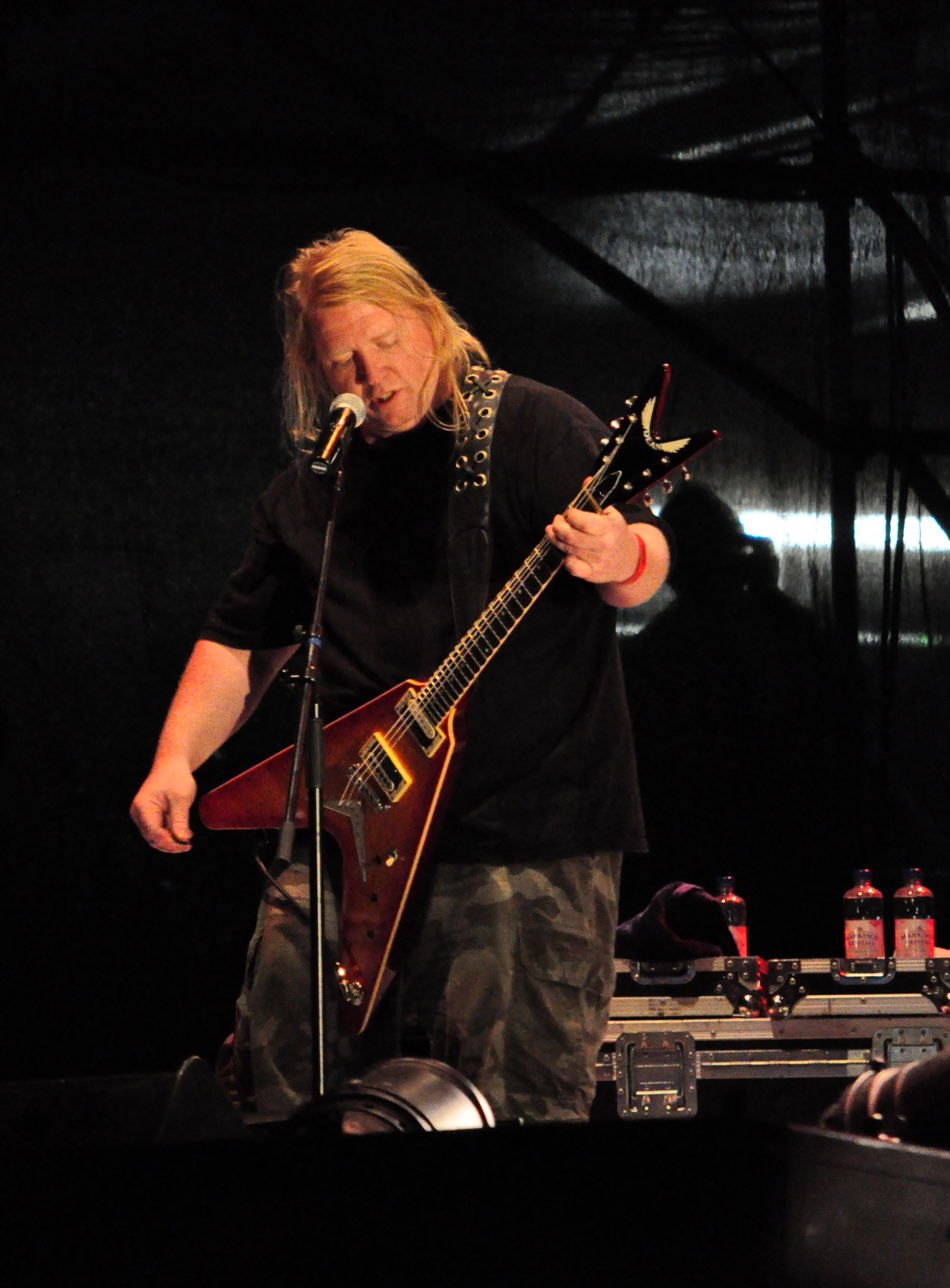
Karl Sanders

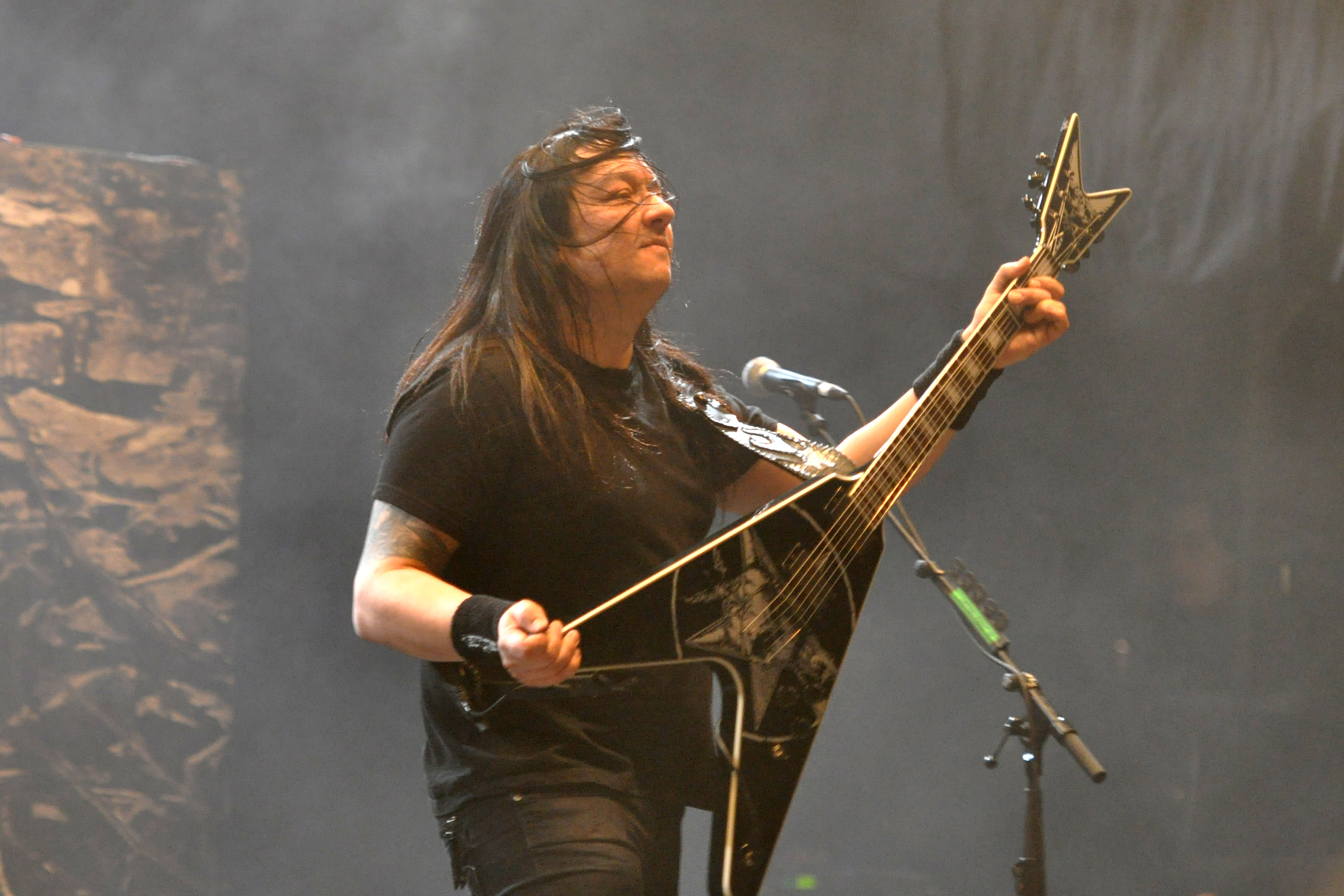
Eric Peterson

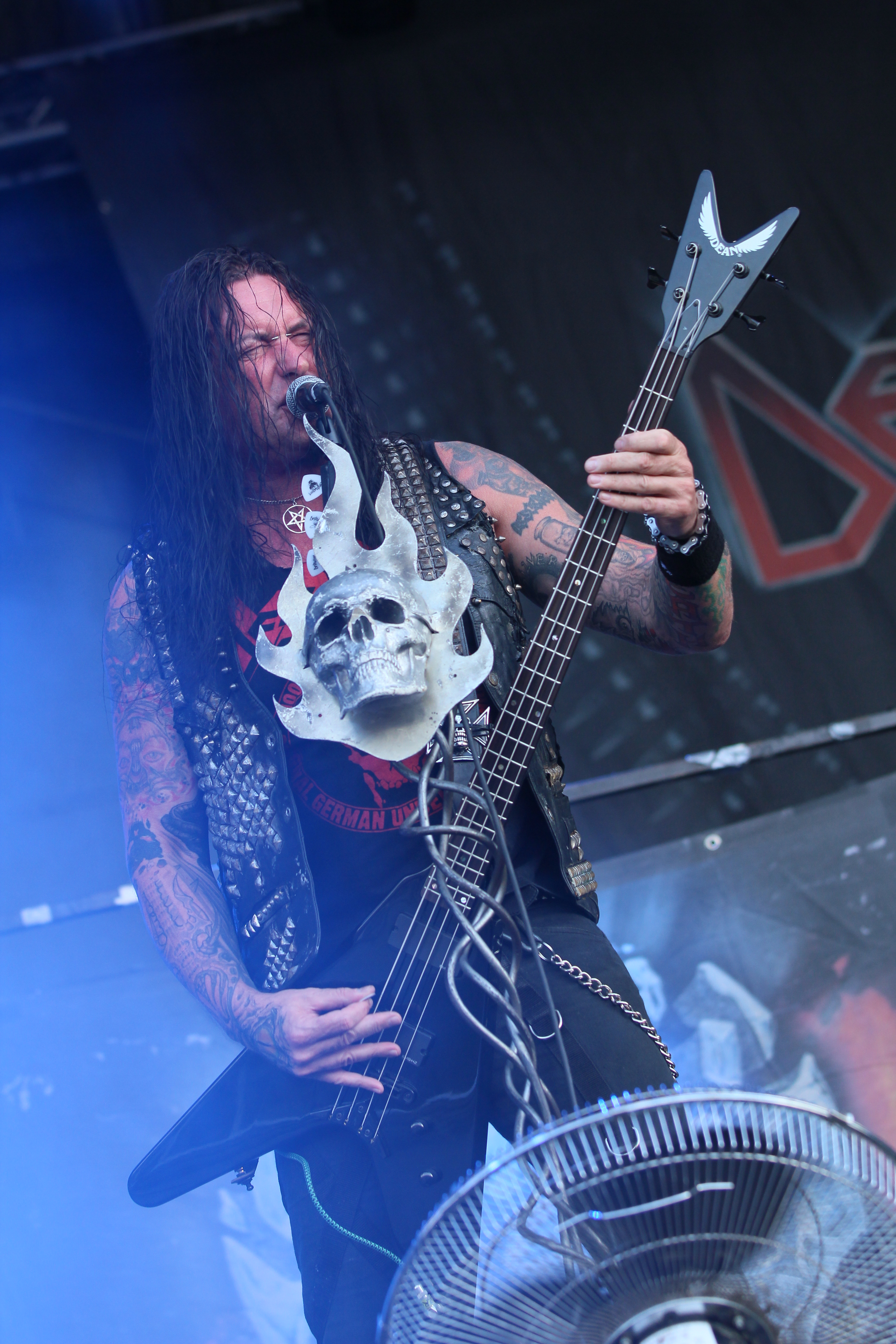
Destruction (band)

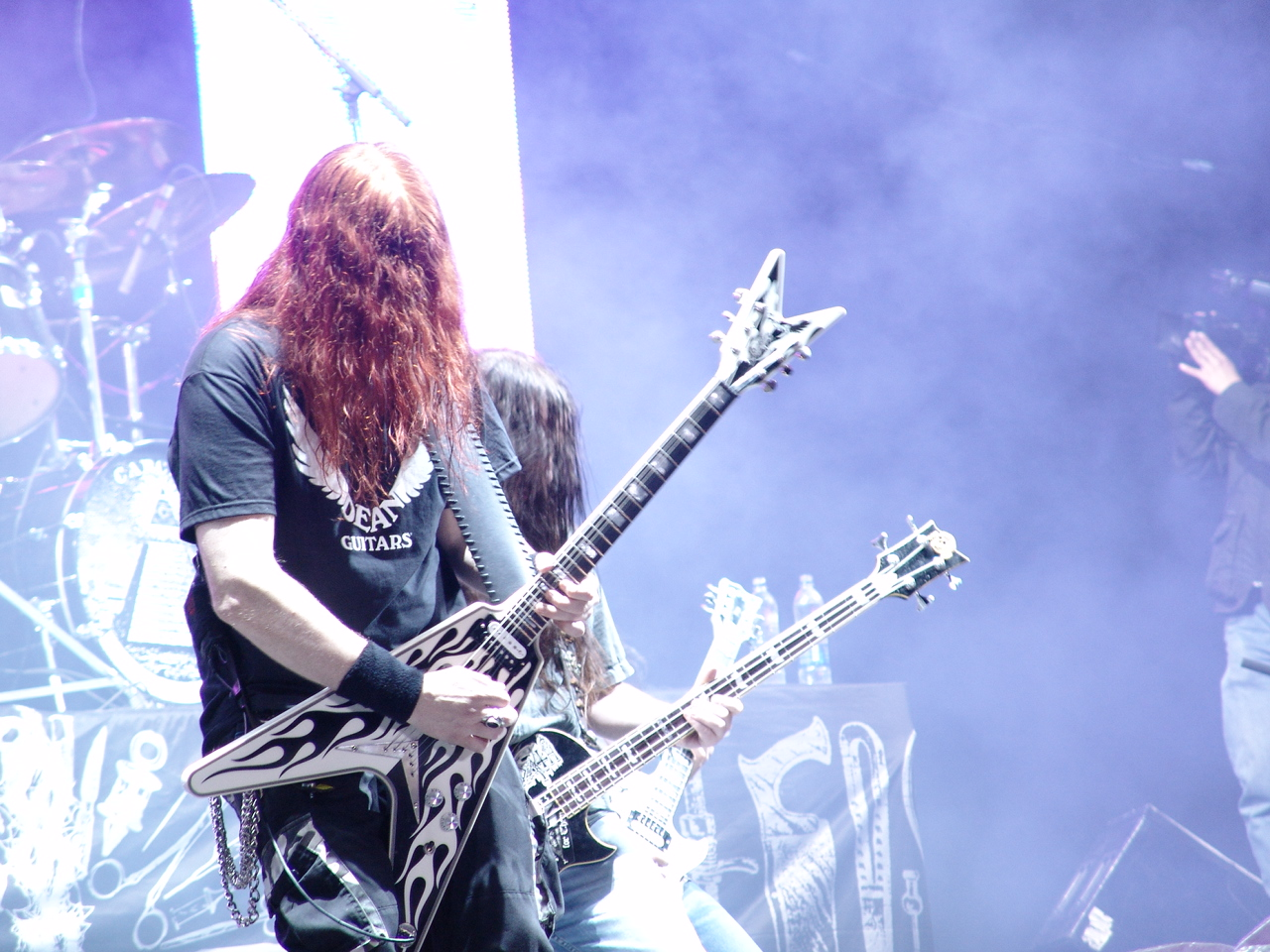
Carcass (band)
