= Gonzalo Soltero =

Mexican writer

Gonzalo Soltero is a barely known underground Mexican writer, who has kept himself outside of the limelight and literary cliques. He seemed obsessed with conspiracy theories which plan to take over Mexico City, and then the World.

He graduated from the UNAM with a bachelor's degree in Latin American Studies. He also studied the Diploma in Creative Writing at SOGEM and an MA in Creative and Media Enterprises at the University of Warwick. His first novel, Sus ojos son fuego, was awarded the Jorge Ibargüengoita National Novel Prize.

Soltero is currently working on his second novel, The Black Seed of Writing.

== Books ==
- Crónicas de neón y asfalto (1996, short stories)
- Tocha (2000, children's story)
- Sus ojos son fuego (2004, novel)
