= Dean ML =

Electric guitar model

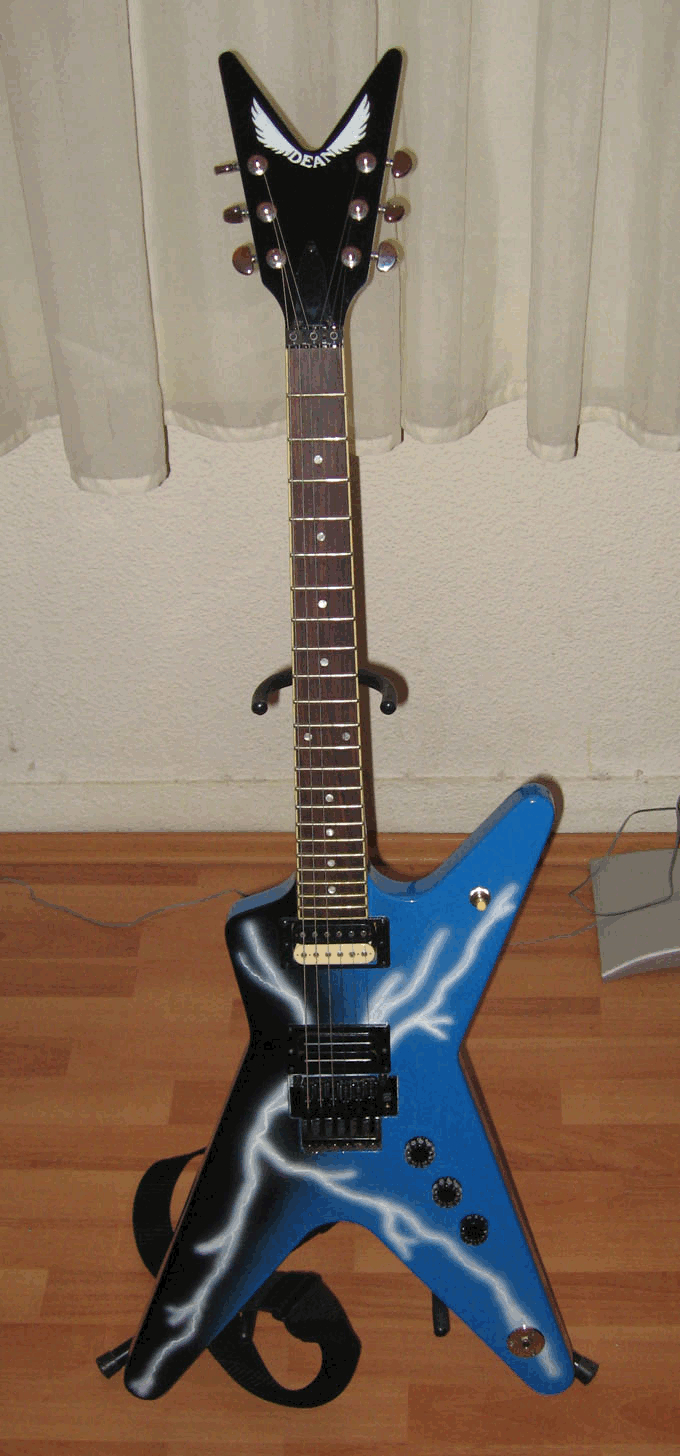
- Replica of the Dean From Hell
- Manufacturer: Dean Guitars
- Period: 1977 — present

Construction
- Body type: Solid
- Neck joint: Set

Woods
- Body: Mahogany, Maple
- Neck: Mahogany
- Fretboard: Ebony, Rosewood

Hardware
- Bridge: Floyd Rose tremolo / String thru
- Pickup(s): 2 EMG, Seymour Duncan, DiMarzio, Humbuckers

Colors available
- Various

The Dean ML is an electric guitar made by Dean Guitars in 1977 along with its counterparts, the Dean V, Dean Cadillac and Dean Z. It has an unusual design, with a V-shaped headstock and V-shaped tailpiece. It was popularized by the guitarist Dimebag Darrell of Pantera.

The neck had a slight "v" shape to it, which for some guitarists facilitated faster playing. The shape fits into some players' hands more comfortably. The design spread the mass of the guitar over a wider area than most guitars to maximize sustain. The V-shaped headstock and "string-through-body" were also intended to increase sustain and improve tone. The Dean ML's body shape resembles a Gibson Flying V combined with the upper half of an Explorer.

== History ==
Dean Zelinsky created the ML in 1977, striving for improved sustain and tone. Higher string angles and string length, due to the size of the headstock, contribute to the overall resonance. Dean has made the ML available to other manufacturers by licensing arrangement.

The ML was named posthumously for the initials of Zelinsky's friend Matthew Lynn, who had died of cancer.

The ML produced in the 90s under Tropical had a slightly different, narrower shape, and was also available as part of the Baby Series as a scaled-down version. The Dean "Metalman" line of bass guitars has a Metalman ML model.

A guitar body shape similar to that of the ML is featured in the "create-an-instrument" mode in the video game Guitar Hero: World Tour.

=== Dean From Hell ===
The "Dean From Hell" was a Flame Series ML used by the late Dimebag Darrell Abbott, shown on the cover of Pantera's album Cowboys from Hell. It has a custom lightning bolt paint job, routed for a Floyd Rose and has a Bill Lawrence L-500XL pickup in the bridge, two traction volume knobs, one master tone knob, mahogany body and a rosewood fretboard. The original has an old Kiss sticker on the bottom left spike and multiple abrasions including burn marks on the tips of the headstock from Abbott shooting bottle rockets from them. The words "THE DEAN FROM HELL" are written on the top in black magic marker.

=== Six-String Masterpieces ===
"Six-String Masterpieces" is an ongoing charitable art tribute for Dimebag Darrell. Musicians, tattooists and contemporary artists painted, sculpted, or drew original art on a Dean ML guitar. Over 70 artists participated including Jerry Cantrell, James Hetfield, Kirk Hammett, Dave Grohl, Ozzy Osbourne, Kerry King, Joe Satriani, Marilyn Manson, Zakk Wylde and Rob Zombie. They were on display at the NAMM Show and on the Ozzfest 2006 tour, MTV's Headbangers Ball and in 2011 at the Mesa Contemporary Arts Center. The exhibit was curated by Curse Mackey of the band Pigface.

== 30th Anniversary ML ==
In 2007, for the 30th anniversary of the ML and V, Dean Guitars produced 100 of the ML with a "Dean 30th Anniversary" logo printed on the headstock and the pickup covers. They were signed by Dean Zelinsky, and had a transparent black finish and hard case.

== Players ==
Notable players of the Dean ML include CJ Stevenson, Eric Peterson, Dimebag Darrell, Michael Angelo Batio, Corey Beaulieu, Matt Heafy, Wayne Static, David Allan Coe, and Michael Schenker.
