= Dean Soltero =

Electric guitar

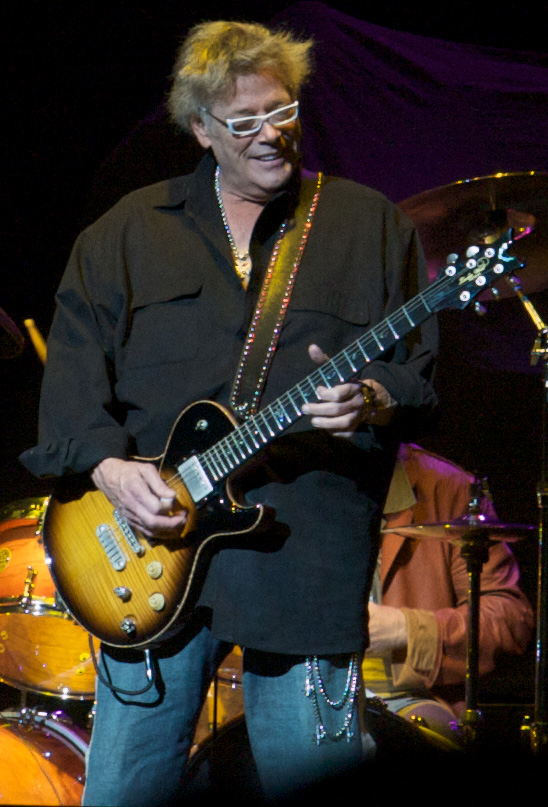
- Leslie West playing a Dean Soltero guitar in 2008
- Manufacturer: Dean Guitars
- Period: 2006 — present

Construction
- Body type: Solid
- Neck joint: Set

Woods
- Body: Mahogany, Maple
- Neck: Mahogany
- Fretboard: Ebony, Rosewood

Hardware
- Bridge: String Thru
- Pickup: 2 Custom Built DiMarzio made for the Soltero Humbuckers

Colors available
- Woodtop

The Dean Soltero is a guitar manufactured by Dean Guitars and was first introduced in 2006. It was designed by Dean Zelinsky, resembles the Gibson Les Paul, and has the classic Dean V profile neck. Soltero means "single" in Spanish and refers to the single cut style of the guitar. The first 100 guitars were hand-signed by Dean himself. Available in four models: USA, USA MHG, Japanese and Korean models. Among the famous guitarists who play a Dean Soltero are Jerry Cantrell of Alice in Chains, and Leslie West, who has his own signature model.

== See also ==
- Gibson Guitars
- Gibson Les Paul
- Dean Cadillac
