= ESP Tom Araya (bass) =

Electric bass guitar model

- Manufacturer: ESP
- Period: 2003-Present

Construction
- Body type: Solid
- Neck joint: Neck-thru

Woods
- Body: Alder
- Neck: 3-piece Maple
- Fretboard: Ebony

Hardware
- Bridge: Gotoh 206B-4
- Pickup: 2 EMG 35-DC

Colors available
- Black

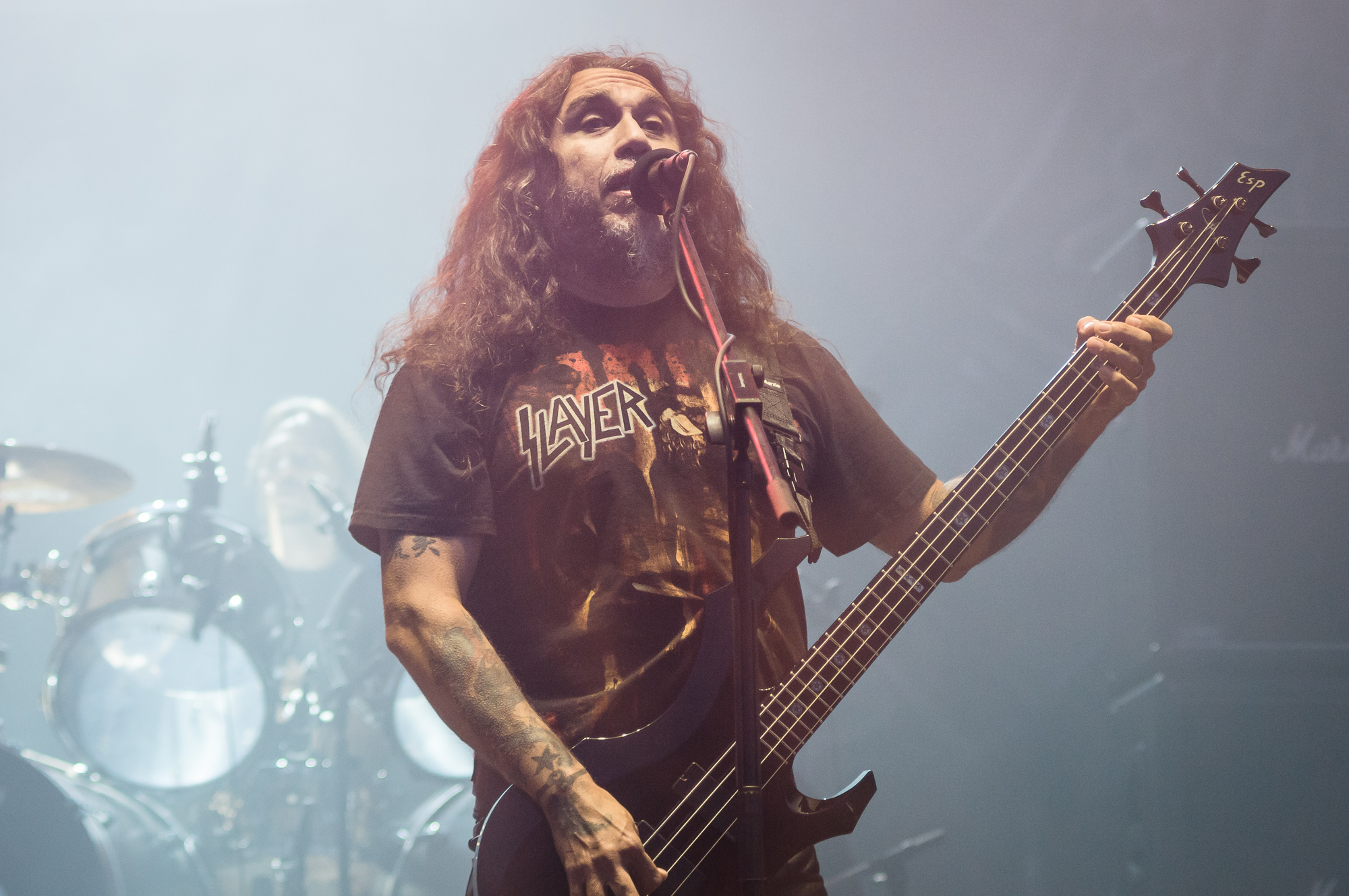
Araya playing his ESP signature bass in 2012

ESP Tom Araya is an electric bass guitar model distributed by ESP Guitars, as customized by Chilean-American musician Tom Araya.

Araya originally discovered ESP when his Slayer bandmates Jeff Hanneman and Kerry King used the company's guitars; the former had his own signature model. He was approached by ESP, who wanted to also make him a signature bass. Araya approved under the condition the bass he plays is the same a fan could purchase at a music store. He wanted the lower-price models to be similar in quality to the high-end models, reasoning "not all the fans can afford a bass that costs an arm and a leg". As of November 2018, ESP has three Araya basses, the top model's list price is $4,499 while the others are $999 and $499.

Among other customization features, Araya wanted the bass to have an unusually thin neck which he prefers to accommodate his playing style.

== See also ==
- ESP Tom Araya (disambiguation)
- Tom Araya
- Slayer
- ESP Guitars
