= Dean Guitars =

American electric guitar manufacturer

- Type: Private
- Industry: Musical instruments
- Founded: 1977; 49 years ago
- Headquarters: Tampa, Florida, United States,
- Area served: Global
- Key people: Pam Rubinson (President & CEO)
- Products: List: Guitars; Electric; Acoustic; Resonator; Classical; Bass guitars; Electric; Acoustic; Banjos; Mandolins; Ukuleles; Amplifiers; Pickups
- Owner: Armadillo Enterprises, Inc.
- Number of employees: 100
- Website: deanguitars.com

Dean Guitars, commonly referred to simply as Dean, is an American importer and maker of stringed instruments and musical products with its headquarters in Tampa, Florida.

Its products include solid-body electric guitars, bass guitars, and acoustic guitars. The company also distributes resonators, basses, banjos, mandolins, ukuleles, amplifiers, guitar cases, accessories, and custom guitar pickups.

The company was founded in Chicago, Illinois, in 1976 by Dean Zelinsky. Armadillo Enterprise purchased the business in 1997.

== History ==
Dean Guitars started in 1976 and made instruments used by bands such as Heart, Kansas, the Cars, Molly Hatchet, Triumph and ZZ Top.

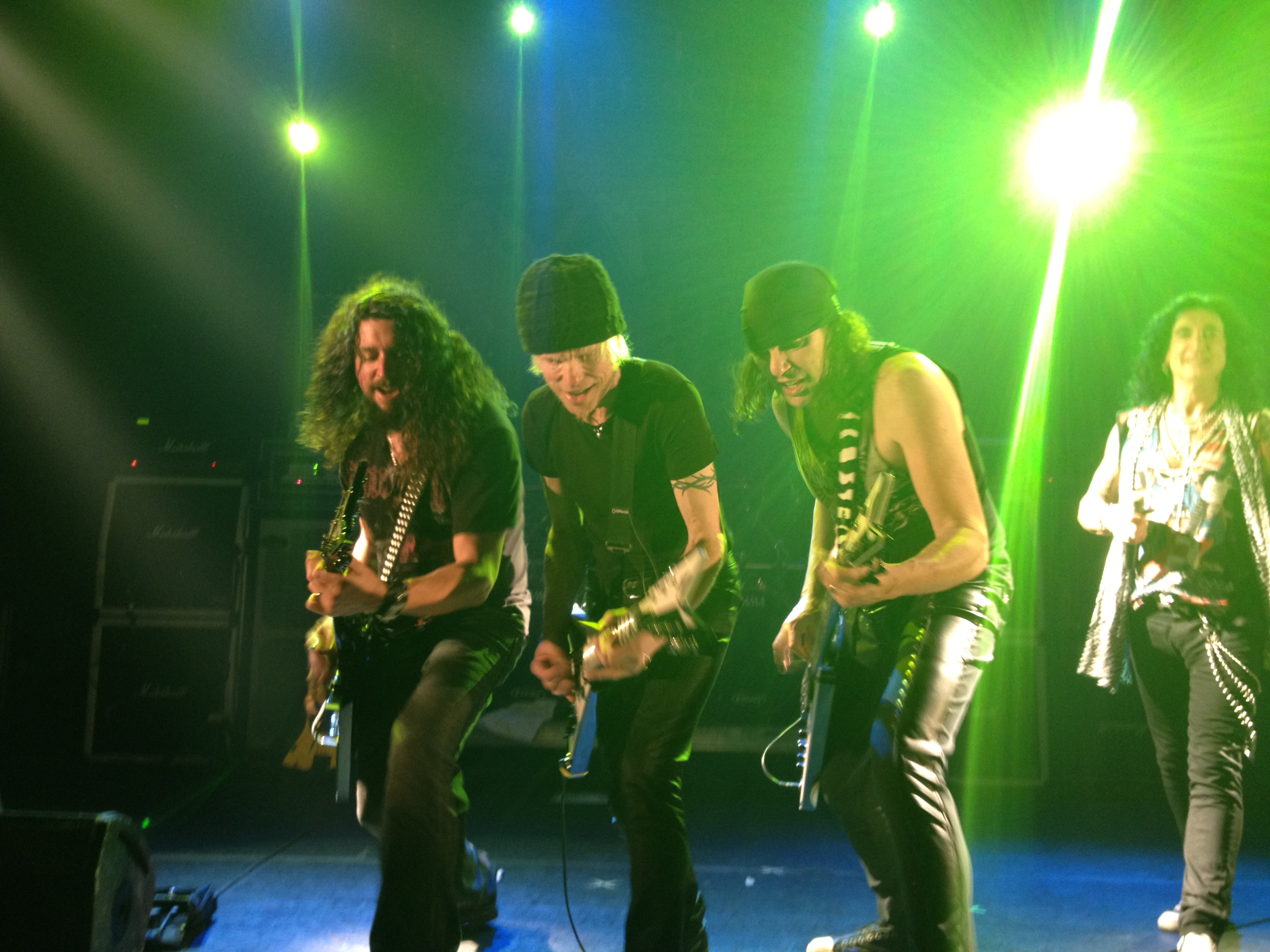
Dean artists Michael Schenker and Wayne Findlay with Dean owner Elliott "Dean" Rubinson

With the advent of the Superstrat and grunge music, Dean Zelinsky sold the business to Oscar Medeiros of Tropical Music, who gained ownership of the brand from 1991, and until 1997 focused on selling to Europe and Latin America. The company had all but disappeared from the American market at that point.

Armadillo Enterprises, under the leadership of Elliott Rubinson, then purchased the business in 1997. Rubinson, a musician who toured as a bass player for the Michael Schenker Group, Uli Jon Roth and Michael Angelo Batio expanded Dean's products to include acoustic, electric and bass guitars; mandolins, banjos and ukuleles with prices from less than $99 to more than $13,000. Rubinson had previously built Thoroughbred Music, a music retail store, music supply, and music clinic. Rubinson sold Thoroughbred to Sam Ash Music in 1999 so he could focus on Dean.

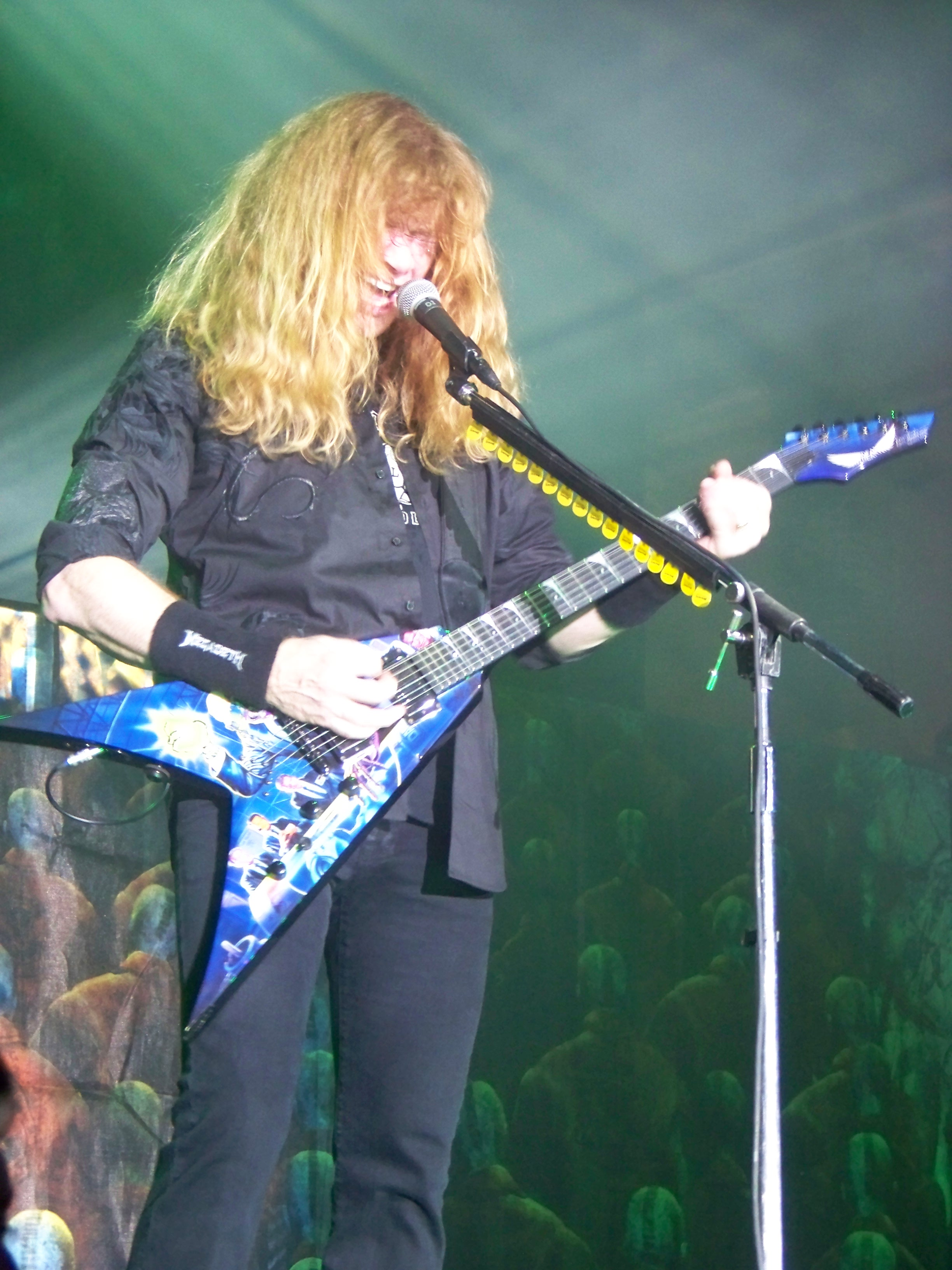
Dave Mustaine with his Dean signature VMNT "Rust in Peace"

After getting a number of endorser-user guitarists (including Dimebag Darrell, Michael Angelo Batio, Michael Schenker, Leslie West, Dave Mustaine, Michael Amott, Koichi Fukuda and Jacky Vincent), Dean Guitars' popularity increased. Under Armadillo Enterprises the company outgrew its Clearwater site and moved to a larger building that includes a custom guitar shop. Today the company also assembles guitar pickups and guitar parts.

In December 2016, Elliott Rubinson's son, Evan Rubinson, assumed the position of President and CEO at Armadillo Enterprises (which includes Dean Guitars, Luna Guitars, and ddrum).

In February 2017, Elliott "Dean" Rubinson died from cancer. Richard Ash, CEO of Sam Ash Music Stores, said, "Elliott was a true genius. He would have been successful in any business but he went with his passion for music and built his business around it... He was truly one of my heroes. RIP Elliott Rubinson."

In June 2026, Dean Guitars' parents company, Armadillo Enterprises, filed for Chapter 11 bankruptcy protection after facing several years of legal trouble regarding selling infringing guitar designs, with the company being ordered to stop selling V and Z instruments. Armadillo claimed that family disputes ultimately caused the decision to file for bankruptcy.

== Instruments ==
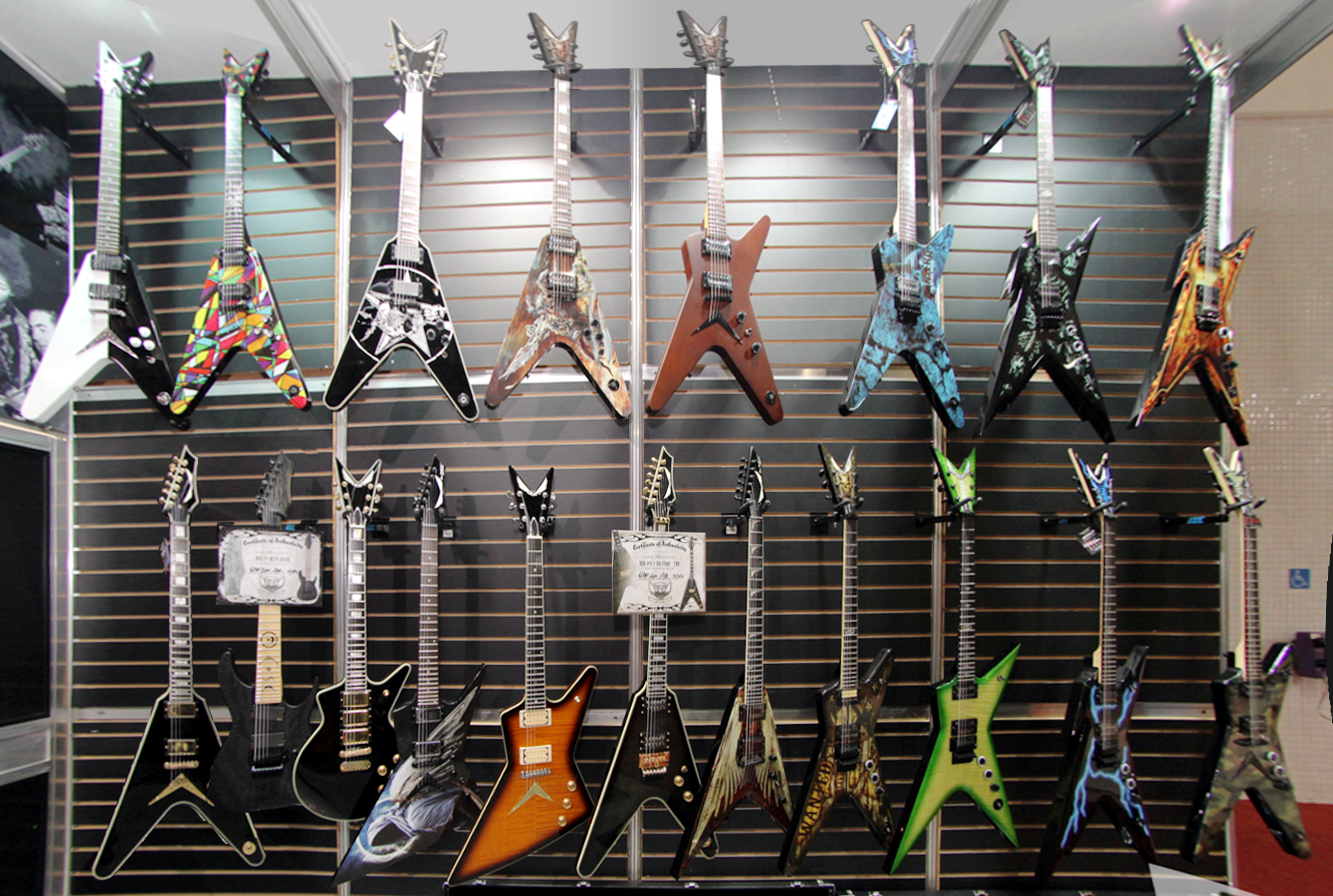
Various Dean guitar models

Dean has the line of electric guitars that includes the ML, V, Z, Cadillac, Splittail, Soltero, EVO, Icon, Custom Zone, Vendetta and Deceiver models.

Dean also has many signature electric guitar models. The company offers a number of custom Dimebag Darrell models.

The company has also worked closely with Dave Mustaine of Megadeth on a line of guitars. These cost from around $300 for imports to over $6000 for USA-built instruments. The Dean USA Dave Mustaine Signature VMNT Holy Grail electric guitar, a more recent incarnation of the V introduced in 2016, is an example of the brand.

Dean also makes signature models for Bret Michaels, Michael Schenker, Leslie West, Michael Angelo Batio, Michael Amott, Rusty Cooley, and other artists.

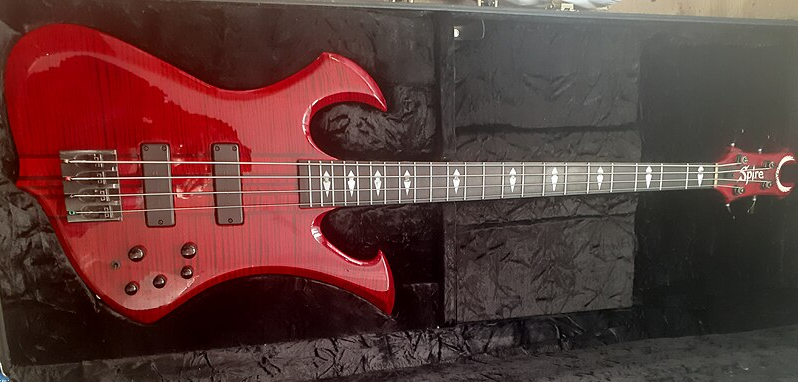
Spire 4 USA Trans Red Finishes Custom Shop (2012), with a 7 pieces neck-thru, ebony fingerboard, brass nut and Custom Bartolini pickups.

The company's bass guitar models include the ML, V, Z, Cadillac, Edge, Metal Man / Demonator, Hillsboro, Entwistle, EVO, Razorback, Spire and Custom Zone. Dean also imports and markets other string instruments such as resonator guitars, mandolins and banjos.

In 2017, Dean unveiled several new musical instruments to commemorate the company's 40th anniversary.

In 2018, the company formed a partnership between Dean USA Custom Shop and Angel's Envy Bourbon to produce the Dean Envy Series guitars made from whiskey cask barrels.

In November 2019, Kerry King, guitarist of Slayer, joined Dean Guitars, and in 2020 they made 2 models: limited edition and standard version

== Affiliated companies ==
Armadillo Enterprises, the parent company of Dean Guitars, also owns Luna Guitars and ddrum.
