= EMG, Inc. =

Guitar pickups and EQ accessories manufacturer

- Type: Privately held company
- Predecessor: Overlend
- Founded: 1976
- Founder: Rob Turner
- Headquarters: Santa Rosa, California, United States
- Area served: Worldwide
- Products: Guitar pickups
- Website: www.emgpickups.com

EMG, Inc. is the current legal name of an American company based in Santa Rosa, California that manufactures guitar pickups and EQ accessories. Among guitar and bass accessories, the company sells active humbucker pickups, such as the EMG 81, the EMG 85, the EMG 60, and the EMG 89. They also produce passive pickups such as the EMG-HZ series, which include SRO-OC1's and SC Sets. There is also a series geared towards a more traditional and passive sound known as the X series.

Their active pickups are most popular among hard rock and metal artists such as Metallica, Slayer, Zakk Wylde, Sepultura, Judas Priest, Exodus, Emperor, Cannibal Corpse, Children of Bodom, Death Angel, Cryptopsy, Malevolent Creation and Primus but also used by others such as Prince, Vince Gill, Kyle Sokol, Steve Winwood, Steve Lukather and David Gilmour.

== History ==
The company was founded in 1976 by Rob Turner in Long Beach, California. It was originally called Dirtywork Studios, and their first pickup continues to be manufactured as models EMG H and EMG HA models. The active humbucking pickup EMG 58 followed soon after. The name was changed to "Overlend" (spelled "Overland" in some sources) in 1978. However, its products have always been called EMG pickups.

In 1981, EMG active pickups became standard equipment on Steinberger basses and guitars. According to Hap Kuffner, EMG pickups originally had widespread success in Europe, after first exhibiting at the 1983 Musikmesse tradeshow in Germany. The name was changed to EMG, Inc. in 1983 ("EMG" stands for "Electro-Magnetic Generator"). As Steinberger guitars became more popular among American metal and rock musicians, so did EMG pickups, and vice versa.

Early EMG pickup designs were made with a bar magnet inside for two reasons. The first reason is that the pole pieces had too much magnetism on the strings and could cause some lower notes to go out of pitch in a Doppler effect. The second reason is that the pole pieces can make tuning and placement of the strings much more difficult. Using the bar magnet however gave the strings a more balanced output. The design of the bar magnet gives it a smoother distortion, better sustain through the amplifier, and have less fade onto the strings than the design of pole pieces.

== Products ==
=== Overview ===
EMG pickups are standard equipment on some models from guitar manufacturers such as BC Rich, ESP, Schecter, Cort, Gibson, Dean, Steinberger, Ibanez, and Jackson Guitars. In addition to pickups, EMG Inc. also has a line of guitar and bass accessories, mainly for altering equalization settings such as bass/treble and gain boosting, and designed to work with most pickups. These can be found in instruments made by companies such as Schecter, who ship almost all of their basses with EMG equalization circuitry.

=== Pickup product range ===
EMG Inc. has four distinct product ranges; the EMG Standard Series, HZ / SRO Series, SA Series and the EMG X-Series. These pickups are all featured on the official EMG Inc. website and include solderless wiring harnesses.

Standard Series

The Standard Series consists of all their standard active guitar, bass, and acoustic pickups, including humbucking, single coil, and bass models for 4, 5, and 6 string basses. EMG active pickups (such as the EMG 60, EMG 81, EMG 85, and EMG 89) tend to have much higher output than passive pickups of similar design (such as the EMG HZ) because of the on-board preamplifier. The high output, noise-reduction and responsiveness of EMG active pickups has made them popular with hard rock and heavy metal guitarists because they overdrive the input stage of guitar amplifiers more dramatically than a lower output pickup could. In 2012 EMG introduced a new 57/66 set to replace the outdated EMG 60 and EMG 81 configuration in which the designs were based on the James Hetfield "JH Het Set" to mix high output from a passive pickup with the punch of the active pickups.

HZ / SRO Series

The HZ / SRO Series is a variety of passive designs of humbucking and single coil pickups, as well as bass models for 4, 5, and 6 string basses. HZ pickups are commonly used in guitar and bass manufacturers as stock pickups.

SA Series

The SA Series is an active single coil pick up with moderate gain output levels famous among Fender Stratocaster players for extra volume and gain while retaining that classic vintage tone.

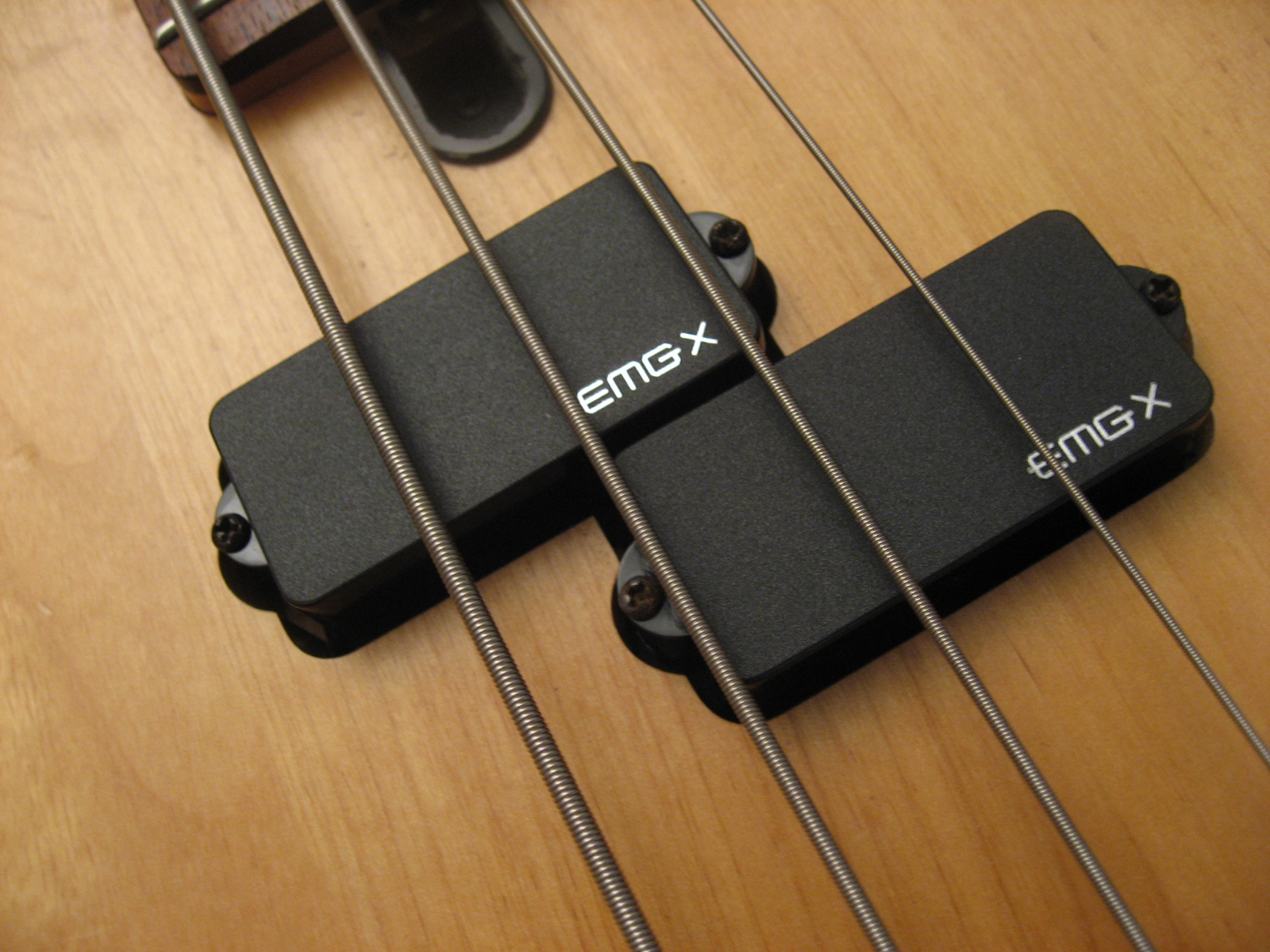
EMG P-X Precision pickups on a bass guitar.

X-Series

The X series is an active product designed to bridge the gulf between passive and active tonalities. They are active but are voiced to sound more organic, with a more rounded signal response like the passives, while retaining the active qualities such as noise reduction and high output.

Signature Pickups and Sets

EMG has released several signature pickups and sets for various artists, the two longest signature artists being Kerry King ("KFK Set") and Zakk Wylde ("ZW Set"), both are which are based around the EMG 81 and EMG 85 set. There are also signature sets for Judas Priest's Glenn Tipton ("GTV Vengenace" set custom-made for Tipton, based on the 81 / 81 set with steel magnets), James Hetfield ("JH HET Set", set custom-made for Hetfield based on the 81 / 60 set with pole-pieces), and a complimentary set for fellow Metallica guitarist Kirk Hammett ("KH Bonebreakers" based on the 81 / 60A set) Exodus' Gary Holt ("GH Set", based around the 81 / 89R in red covers), Children of Bodom's Alexi Laiho (passive custom EMG pickup with a custom-voiced boost preamp), and Black Sabbath's Geezer Butler (passive P and P/J voiced for Butler). Metallica's Robert Trujillo received a signature set ("RT Rip Tide" based on EMG's standard Jazz Bass pickups). Signature pickguards on offer include those made to the specifications of Steve Lukather, David Gilmour, and Vince Gill.

== Endorsements ==
Some artists and bands who use or endorse EMG pickups include:

- Black Veil Brides
- Cannibal Corpse
- David Gilmour
- Dino Cazares
- El Hefe
- James Hetfield
- Jim Root
- Killswitch Engage
- Kirk Hammett
- Kyle Sokol
- Les Claypool
- Rammstein
- Rob Trujillo
- Sepultura
- Slayer
