= George Washburn =

George Washburn may refer to:

- George Washburn (baseball) (1914–1979), American baseball player
- George P. Washburn (1846–1922), American architect
- George Washburn (educator) (1833–1915), American educator
- Washburn Guitars, originally sold under the "George Washburn" trademark

== See also ==
- George Washburn House, Calais, Maine
