= Hinckley Hill Historic District =

Historic district in Maine, United States

- U.S. National Register of Historic Places
- U.S. Historic district
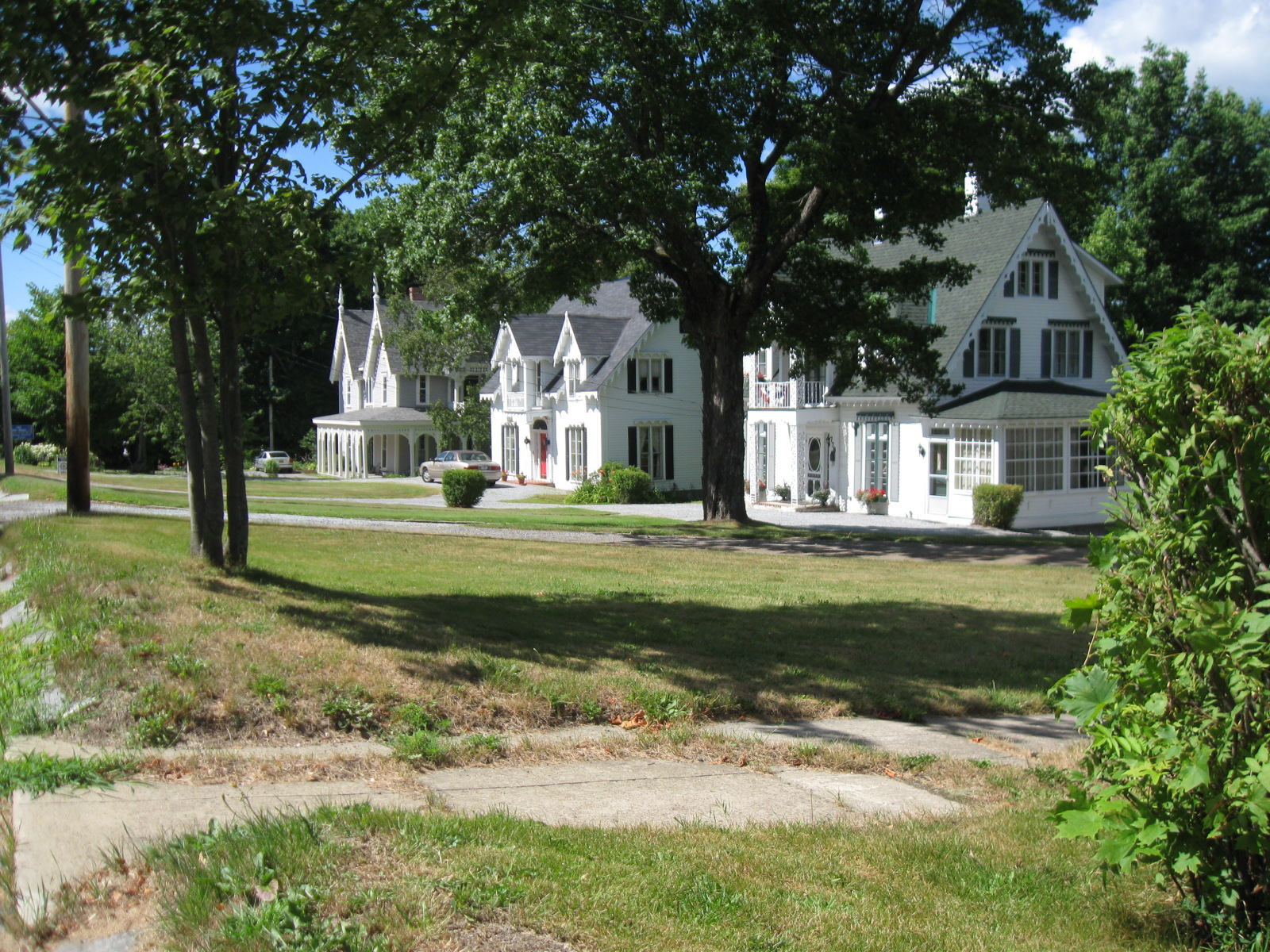

- Location within Maine Location within the United States
- Location: River Rd., Calais, Maine
- Area: 12 acres (4.9 ha)
- Built: 1820
- Architect: Matthew Stead, J.C. Rockwood
- Architectural style: Gothic Revival, Italianate, Greek Revival
- NRHP reference No.: 94001244
- Added to NRHP: October 28, 1994

The Hinckley Hill Historic District encompasses a well-preserved collection of stylish mid-19th century residences in Calais, Maine. Built mostly between 1820 and 1860, it includes a trio of high-quality Gothic Revival houses from the 1850s near the eastern edge of the town. The district was listed on the National Register of Historic Places in 1994.

== Description and history ==
The Hinckley Hill area is located on River Road, the eastward extension of Main Street beyond the central town grid. The district includes five properties on the south side of River Road, just east of Franklin Street, and another five on the north side, extending eastward from just opposite the last of the southern five. All are residential properties with wood frame houses, 1-1/2 to 2-1/2 stories in height. The oldest house is a c. 1820 Cape with Federal style decoration, while the most recent historic property is an early 20th century Colonial Revival house. Two houses built after 1950 are not historically significant.

The most visually distinctive of the district's houses are a trio of Gothic Revival buildings on the north side of River Road. Built between 1850 and 1855, they are among the town's most architecturally sophisticated buildings, constructed at a time when the town still had a frontier feel to it. Of these, the George Washburn House and the Alexander Gilmore House are both also individually listed on the National Register for their architecture. The Gilmore House is one of two with a known architect: it was designed by New Brunswick architect Matthew Stead.

== See also ==
- National Register of Historic Places listings in Washington County, Maine
