= Parker Guitars =

Defunct American guitar manufacturing company

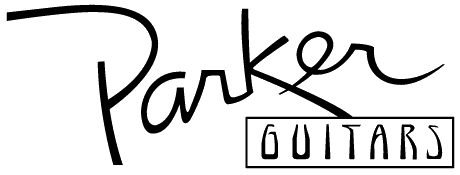
- Type: Private
- Industry: Musical instruments
- Founded: 1993
- Founder: Ken Parker
- Defunct: 2016; 10 years ago
- Headquarters: Chicago, Illinois, United States
- Products: electric and acoustic guitars, basses
- Parent: Jam Industries (2009–16)

Parker Guitars was an American manufacturer of electric and acoustic guitars and basses, founded by luthier Ken Parker in 1993. Parker guitars were distinguished for their characteristic light weight and the use of composite materials.

Parker's most famous guitar was the Fly model, an electric guitar made with a slim, lightweight core of real wood (such as spruce, poplar, or basswood, for example), reinforced with a carbon fiber exoskeleton to provide unparalleled rigidity for a solid body electric guitar. The mixture of materials also resulted in a lighter instrument than had been available up to that time, weighing a mere 2 kg (4.4 lb). The early "Fly" models were highly appreciated by musicians and well received by critics.

The Parker company was acquired by the U.S. Music Corporation in 2003, which was itself sold to Jam Industries in August 2009. As of November 2016, the brand was inactive after the factory in Illinois was closed.

== History ==
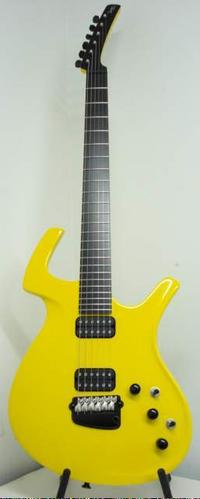
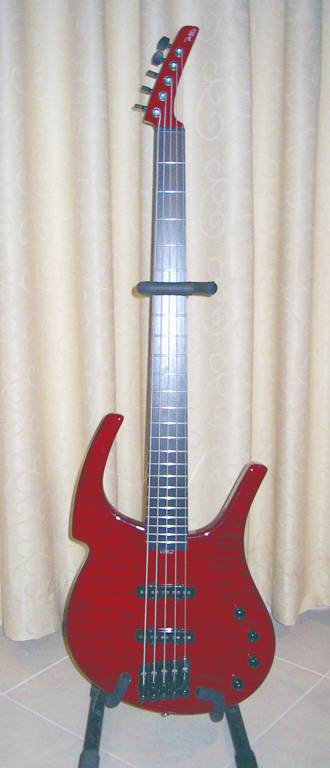
The Fly was the first model produced by Parker. The guitars (left) and basses (right) were made using traditional tone woods and composite materials, resulting in light weight instruments

The first model launched by Parker was the Fly in 1993. Designed by Ken Parker and Larry Fishman, this model was unique for its use of composite materials and light weight. The guitar's combination of traditional magnetic pickups and piezo-electrics in the bridge allowed players to achieve both electric and acoustic tones. Perhaps most significant to the guitar's design is the almost complete absence of a neck heel to permit greater ease of access to the uppermost frets.

Parker guitars were characterized as thin and ultra-lightweight instruments; they were generally made from lighter woods like poplar, basswood, and spruce, although there were maple and mahogany Fly models. They had composite materials (resin, epoxy and carbon glass skin) to reinforce a thin carved body and neck. Fingerboards were composite and use stainless steel frets. Electronics include the integrated use of coil split humbuckers, single coil and piezo pickups with active circuitry. The proprietary vibrato bridge used a unique flat steel spring which helped the guitar to maintain the pitch. The vibrato had three settings; bend down only, full floating and locked.

In October 2002, Parker initiated the first production run of the Fly bass guitar, in both 4-string and 5-string versions. The 5-strings were noted for their ease of use for 4-string players, both with respect to weight and string spacing. Parker 4-string basses produced in the original factory in Wilmington, MA shipped in 2003 and had seven-digit serial numbers using the same formula for dating as the original NiteFly guitars while 5-string basses were shipped first and had six-digit numbers that begin with 092 reflecting the 2002 manufacturing. Basses made by U.S. Music Corporation used the same seven-digit formula continuing the 4-string serial number and dating. As with other Parker guitars, they offered both magnetic and piezoelectric pickups, with the ability to blend the two. The Fly Bass was discontinued in 2008 and Parker offered 4- and 5-string basses with the newer MaxxFly shape.

The last original Fly guitars, with the balance wheel on the face of the guitar and the four-knob layout, appeared in 2003. That same year, the Fly was "refined" with a new control layout, consisting of a master volume, a master tone (with coil-split function) and a master volume for the piezo, eliminating the separate volume control for the magnetic pickups and the piezo tone control. Numerous other changes were made as well.

Several Special edition Flys were also introduced in later years. Major names in these were; the Fly Mojo Snakeskin, stock guitars covered in snakeskin; the "Four Seasons" Fly Mojos with thematically corresponding finishes; and a koa Fly Mojo released as part of the Select series.

In 2010, the MaxxFly model was introduced. Based on the Fly, the MaxxFly features a modified headstock (allowing the instrument to be hung a standard guitar wall hanger), a modified top horn (more ergonomically and traditionally shaped), standardized pickup cavities, 22 frets instead of 24, and a slightly thicker, heavier body. It shares the same general construction as the standard Fly.

When Parker sold his company to the U.S. Music Corporation in 2003, most of the guitars started to be manufactured outside the United States.

== Artists ==
Musicians that play, or have played, Parker guitars include:

- Pat Martino
- Howard Bellamy
- Matt Bellamy
- Adrian Belew
- Todd Tamanend Clark
- Johnny Clegg
- Reeves Gabrels
- Vernon Reid
- Trent Reznor
- Daniel Gildenlöw (Pain Of Salvation)
- Greg Howe
- Kiko Loureiro
- Dave Martone
- Adrian Lewis
- Joni Mitchell
- Mark Farner
- Robin Finck
- David Lynch
- Harvey Mandel
- Danny Lohner & Aaron North (Nine Inch Nails)
- Adam Dutkiewicz (Killswitch Engage)
- Dewa Budjana
- Deron Miller (CKY)
- Jeff Cook
- Gustavo Cerati
- Marcelo Tavarone
- Martin Barre
- Pin (Sikth)
- Dave Navarro
- Michael Stanley
- Danny Powers
- Noize MC
- Phil Keaggy
- Joe Walsh
- Roine Stolt (The Flower Kings, Transatlantic)
- Ture Rückwardt (FEX)

== Models ==
- Fly (Mojo, Deluxe, Classic, Artist, Supreme)
- MaxxFly (DF824, DF842, DF1024, DF724, DF624, DF524, DF523, RF722, RF622, RF522, PDF105, PDF100, PDF85, PDF80, PDF70, PDF60, PDF35, PDF30, 4 & 5 String and fretless Basses)
- Adrian Belew signature model DFAB842 MaxxFly
- Vernon Reid signature model MaxxFly
- Adam Dutkiewicz signature model MaxxFly (Discontinued)
- SC and SC Mojo (Note: The single-cut version of the Fly, also known as the PM60.)
- P-Basses
- P-Series acoustics
- Fly (Concert/Bronze, Nylon)
- Nitefly (Classic, Swamp Ash, Mojo)
- P44 (V, PRO)
- P-42
- P-40
- P-30
- P-36
- P-38
- PM20PRO
- PM24V
- PM20
- PM10
