= Parker Fly =

Model of electric guitar

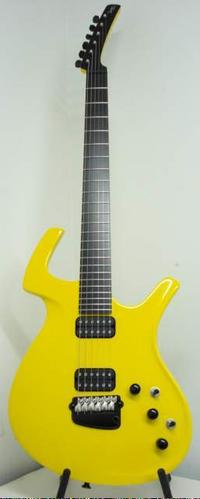
- Manufacturer: Parker Guitars
- Period: 1993–2016

Construction
- Body type: Solid Double Cut
- Neck joint: Set
- Scale: 25.5"

Woods
- Body: Various tone woods with a carbon fibre exoskeleton
- Neck: Various tone woods with a carbon fibre exoskeleton
- Fretboard: Carbon Fibre

Hardware
- Bridge: Fishman piezo vibrato bridge
- Pickup: 2 splitable Humbuckers 1 single coil 1 piezo

Colors available
- Various

The Parker Fly was a model of electric guitar built by Parker Guitars. It was designed by Ken Parker and Larry Fishman, and first produced in 1993. The Fly is unique among electric guitars in the way it uses composite materials. It is notable for its light weight (4.5 lb; 2.0 kg) and resonance. It was also one of the first electric guitars to combine traditional magnetic pickups with piezoelectric pickups, allowing the guitarist to access both acoustic and electric tones. In 2003, Parker Guitars was acquired by U.S. Music Corporation (which in 2009 was sold to Jam Industries). Production ended in 2016 and the company has not released a new model of any kind since.

Inspired by earlier musical instruments like the lute, Ken Parker began experimenting with hardwood exoskeletons to provide rigidity to the instrument but hardwood was too difficult to work with and did not achieve satisfactory results. Inspired by a friend who used carbon fiber to build speed boats, Ken Parker started experimenting with the material. Flys were built with an exoskeleton along the back and around the neck of the guitar. It was made from a carbon fibre/glass/epoxy composite material that is thinner than the paint finish. The same composite also comprised the fretboard material.

The exoskeleton supposedly provided the guitar with strength and rigidity, as well as increasing the guitar's sustain. It also possibly gave the added benefit of allowing a smaller, more efficient body. One of Ken Parker's primary goals in designing the Fly was to build a guitar with less mass than a traditional electric guitar but with the same or even more rigidity. The composite exoskeleton was one of the primary reasons why such a design is possible, he claimed.

== Frets ==
The frets on the Parker Fly were constructed of hardened stainless-steel, they had no tangs, and were instead attached using an adhesive. Parker Fly guitars typically had twenty-four frets.

== Vibrato system ==
The Parker Fly had a vibrato system that allowed the player to select from a fixed-bridge mode, a bend-down-only mode, and a free-float mode. The vibrato system used a flat spring allowing the user to easily adjust the tension. The spring's natural tension was selected according to the gauge of strings used by the guitar player. The original Fly design incorporated a wheel on the face of the guitar to adjust the spring tension, while more recent models have moved the tension adjustment to inside the guitar. The bridge had been designed to stay in perfect tune, even with heavy use of the vibrato bar.

== Pickups ==
Most versions of the Parker Fly featured a set of two magnetic Humbucker style pickups and a Fishman developed piezoelectric pickup designed to emulate acoustic guitar sounds. The piezoelectric pickup was aided by an onboard active pre-amplifier that required the use of a 9 volt battery. The magnetic pickups were passive, but sat within the active circuit path. Fly guitars featured a stereo output jack, allowing the piezo and magnetic pickups to be sent to different amplifiers, or blended into a mono signal. Some Fly models had only magnetic pickups, for traditional electric guitar sounds, while some models had only piezo pickups, for use as solid-body acoustic-electric guitars.

The Parker Fly's magnetic pickups are based on the traditional humbucker design, but feature a proprietary mounting system which eliminates the need for pickup rings and mounting brackets. The pickups are instead mounted via two extended pole pieces that screw into bushings sunk into the pickup cavities of the guitar. This mounting system produces a cleaner looking interface between the pickups and the instrument. The first humbuckers used for the Fly were produced by Dimarzio based on their Air Norton (neck position), and ToneZone (bridge position) designs. These pickups are commonly referred to as "Gen 1 Dimarzios". Responding to complaints about their non traditional hi-fi sound, Dimarzio introduced a new set of humbuckers in the spring of 1999. Commonly referred to as "Gen 2 Dimarzios", these new pickups were custom designed for the Fly's unique voicing. Featuring ceramic magnets, the Gen 2 design had more mid range focus, and higher output than their predecessors, and were still used on many of the last Fly models.

== Sperzel tuners ==
The Parker Fly guitars are equipped with Sperzel tuners, which allow the string to be locked into place at the pole in which it winds. This feature allowed the string to remain fastened into the pole without requiring more than one wind.

== Refined Fly ==
Shortly before Parker Guitars was acquired by U.S. Music Corporation, the Fly was changed to make it more production-friendly and less expensive to produce. The biggest change was moving the tension wheel, which adjusts the spring tension of the bridge, from its original through body position to behind a cover. The battery compartment was made more accessible and the 3 way vibrato arm switch was moved. The stereo button was removed and replaced with a smart switch. Additionally the ribbon wiring harness was replaced with the less expensive Nite Fly wiring.

== Notable users ==
Parker Flys have been played by John Lees, Martin Barre, Gustavo Cerati, Adrian Belew, Matt Bellamy, David Bowie, Carlos Alomar, Steve DeMarchi, Amir Derakh, Anssi Kela, The Edge, Mark Farner, Reeves Gabrels, Synyster Gates, Daniel Gildenlöw, Phil Keaggy, Brian May, Joni Mitchell, Dan Schafer, Dave Navarro, Lou Reed, Trent Reznor, Paul Simon, Pete Townshend, Juan Luis Guerra, Joe Walsh, Vernon Reid, Bob Weir, Jason Mendonca, Harvey Mandel, David Lynch, Daniel Jones, Jon Gutwillig, Kitchie Nadal, Barbie Almalbis, Greg Gonzalez, Alejandro Sanz, Deron Miller, J Mascis, and Ture Rückwardt.

== Fly models ==
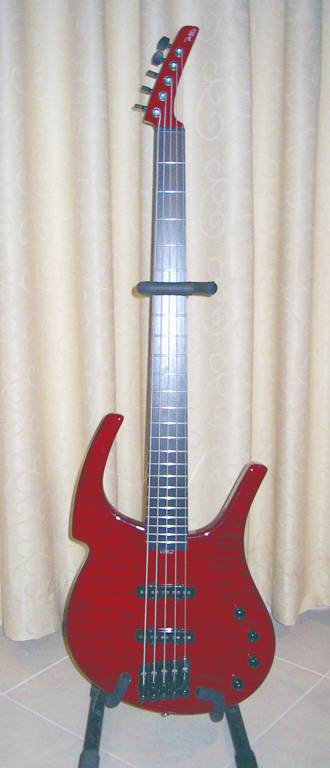
5-string Fly bass

Fly Deluxe
The Fly Deluxe has a solid poplar body, basswood neck, and Dimarzio pickups.
Fly Classic
The Fly Classic has a mahogany body, basswood neck, and Dimarzio pickups.
Fly Mojo
The Fly Mojo has a body and neck of solid mahogany, and Seymour Duncan pickups.
Fly Artist
The Fly Artist has a solid Sitka spruce body, basswood neck, and Dimarzio pickups.
Fly Supreme
The Fly Supreme has a solid big leaf maple body (earliest production, 1 piece; later, 2 pieces), basswood neck, and Dimarzio pickups.
Fly Concert (later called the Fly Bronze)
The Fly Concert/Bronze has a solid spruce body, basswood neck, light-gauge acoustic-style bronze strings, hardtail, and no magnetic pickup. Color: transparent butterscotch (natural); also (rare) in Ebony (a grand piano-like black). The Fly Artist is similar, but has magnetic pickups and tremolo bridge.
Spanish/Nylon Fly
Designed to appeal to classical guitar players, this is strung with nylon strings, and has no magnetic pickups.
Nite Fly
Constructed of a variety of different tone woods and featuring various pickup combinations, the Nite Fly uses a bolt-on neck, and lacks the intricate sculpting found on the Fly body.
Fly Deluxe, Adrian Belew Edition
This is a Fly Deluxe with a Sustainiac pickup, Variax components, and a specialized piezo pickup that allows for guitar synthesizer applications.
MIDI Fly
Based on a Nite Fly body and made between 1999 and 2002, the MIDIFly has a mahogany body and Parker's TurboTone neck (also constructed of mahogany) with Virtual DSP Corp.'s MidiAxe guitar-to-MIDI converter system. It has custom DiMarzio pickups plus an active Fishman piezo system. The MIDIFly's Fishman piezo circuit triggers the internal MidiAxe DSP, resulting in a MIDI guitar controller. A MidiAxe editor program for Windows PC was provided on CD-ROM.
Fly Bass
The Fly Bass was made as a 4 or 5 string model. It has a sitka spruce body made from 21 pieces of spruce sandwiched between quilted maple veneer top and back, with the headstock made of curly maple. The mahogany neck was originally made of 15 layers of laminated mahogany but was later changed to a solid mahogany neck to lower production costs. The neck is wrapped in a skin of carbon fiber with a 10" to 15" conical section fretboard radius. It has two custom DiMarzio Ultra Jazz humbucking pickups with an active Fishman EQ and a Fishman piezo system. Sperzel locking machine heads and a GraphTech nut are standard. It was available in three colour tobacco sunburst, natural, transparent red and transparent blue.
