= U.S. Music =

U.S. Music may refer to:

- Music of the United States
- U.S. Music Corporation
