= A. B. Butler House =

Historic house in Maine, United States

- U.S. National Register of Historic Places
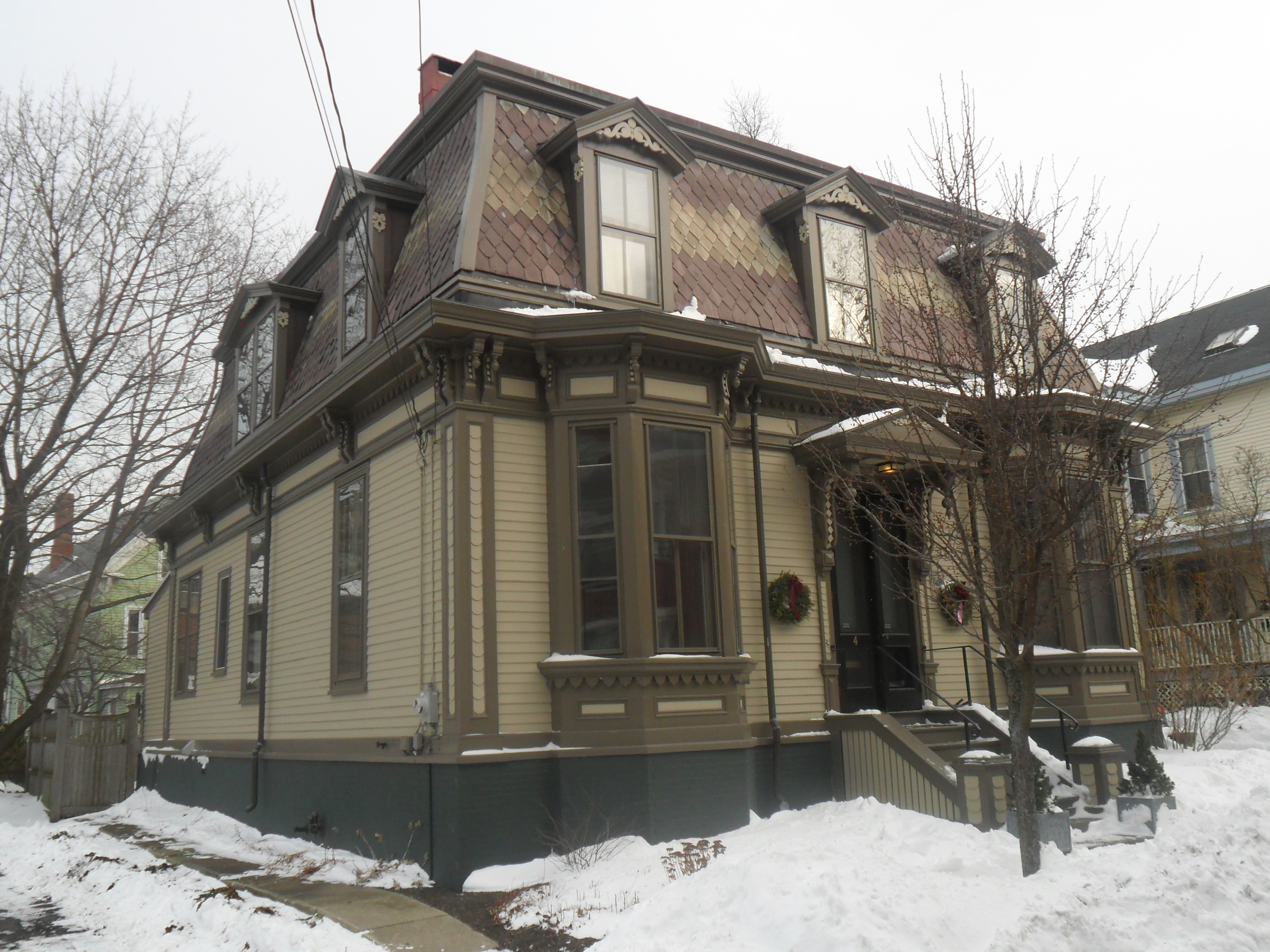
- The A.B. Butler House in January 2011

- Location within Maine Location within the United States
- Location: 4 Walker Street, Portland, Maine
- Coordinates: 43°39′9.4″N 70°16′10″W
- Area: 1 acre (0.40 ha)
- Built: 1868
- Architect: Matthew Stead
- Architectural style: Italian Villa
- NRHP reference No.: 74000158
- Added to NRHP: May 8, 1974

The A. B. Butler House is an historic house at 4 Walker Street in Portland, Maine, United States. Built in 1868, it is a remarkably little-altered high-quality example of Second Empire architecture, and one of two surviving designs in the city of architect Matthew Stead. It was listed on the National Register of Historic Places on May 8, 1974.

== Description and history ==
The house is set in Portland's West End neighborhood, just south of Congress Street on the east side of Walker Street. It is a 1 1/2-story wood-framed structure, with a mansard roof providing a full second story. The roof is finished with diamond-cut slate shingles, in bands colored beige and red. The building is finished in wooden clapboards, with corner pilasters, and a dentillated and paneled entablature with paired brackets below the roofline. The front facade is symmetrical, with projecting polygonal bays on either side of the entrance, and gabled dormers in the roof line with decorate scrollwork in the gable peaks. The main entrance is sheltered by a bracketed hood. A rear ell, built with sympathetic styling, houses modern amenities, while the main house interior retains original woodwork and finishes, including a remarkable set of trompe-l'œil frescos in its central hall and stairwell.

It was built in 1868 for Albert Berry Butler, a prominent local dry goods merchant. It was designed by Matthew Stead, an architect from New Brunswick who produced many designs in the wake of Portland's devastating 1866 fire. This house is one of only two of his local designs to survive; the other is the commercial Merchants' National Bank.

== See also ==
- Gilmore House, another Stead design
- National Register of Historic Places listings in Portland, Maine
