= Dave Martone =

- Born: January 16, 1970 (age 55) Beamsville, Ontario, Canada
- Origin: Vancouver, British Columbia, Canada
- Genres: progressive rock
- Occupation(s): Musician and record producer
- Instrument: Guitar
- Labels: Magna Carta
- Website: davemartone.com

Dave Martone (born January 16, 1970) is a Canadian guitarist and record producer, based out of Vancouver, British Columbia.

Over his career, Dave Martone has performed alongside artists including:

- Michael Angelo Batio
- Jennifer Batten
- Marty Friedman
- Paul Gilbert
- Greg Howe
- Yngwie Malmsteen
- Mike Portnoy
- Chester Thompson
- Joe Satriani
- Billy Sheehan
- Daniel Adair
- Nickelback

== Early life and education ==
Martone was born in Beamsville, Ontario.

Dave began learning guitar at the age of 6. His father, who is also a guitarist, taught him Classical guitar and then had a teacher from Spain (Gary Santucci) teach him Classical and Flamenco. After taking lessons with Santucci, and discovering heavy metal music, he learned in his parents' basement with cassette tapes, guitar magazines, and self-instructions books. The first rock song he had learned by ear was "War Pigs" by Black Sabbath from their greatest hits record.

He obtained a recording engineering diploma from Fanshawe College in Ontario in 1990, and graduated from the Berklee College of Music, in Boston, Massachusetts, where he studied with Jon Finn, Joe Stump, Jim Kelly and Bruce Bartlett, with a performance major in 1995.

Popular guitar players who have inspired and influenced him to play guitar are Angus Young, Gary Moore, Tony MacAlpine, Tony Iommi and Edward Van Halen.

== Career ==
Martone conducts clinics at Berklee, which he has been doing since his graduation.

His solo project, Martone, which is composed of him, Daniel Adair and Dave Spidel, is signed to Magna Carta Records.

Martone has worked for Tom Lee Music and the National Guitar Workshop as an instructor, and continues to instruct through clinics worldwide. He has been directing the Tom Lee Music School of Rock program in Vancouver since 2003, and has hosted the Satch Zone guitar instructional online lessons alongside Joe Satriani through Workshop Live.

From 2001 to 2011, he was a bi-monthly columnist for guitar9.com, writing about production, recording, equipment, and playing techniques.

In 2006, Martone contributed a guitar solo to the album project Artists for Charity - Guitarists 4 the Kids, produced by Slang Productions, to assist World Vision Canada in helping underprivileged kids in need.

Martone is endorsed by Cakewalk, Digitech, Electro-Voice, GHS, Parker Guitars and Vox.

On most albums he plays with longtime best friend Daniel Adair, who plays for the band Nickelback. He also owns and operates Brainworks Studio, located in Vancouver. In 2020, Martone along with Nickelback recorded a cover of "The Devil Went Down to Georgia".

=== Discography ===
==== Solo albums ====
- Feel the Silence EP (1993)
- Shut Up n' Listen (1995)
- Zone (1999)
- A Demon's Dream (2002)
- When the Aliens Come (2007)
- Clean (2008)
- Nacimiento (2015)

==== With Synesthesia ====
- Synesthesia (2000)

==== With Glen Drover ====
- Live At Metalworks (2013) (Including DVD)

==== With Nickelback ====
- The Devil Went Down To Georgia (2020)

===== DVDs =====
- Martone (2004)
- Live in Your Face (2007)
- Live At Metalworks (2013)

===== Guest appearance =====
- (2001) Various Artists, "Crushing Days - A Tribute To Joe Satriani", Crush Of Love (track 6)
- (2003) Various Artists, "Rewired: A Tribute To Jeff Beck", Goodbye Pork Pie Hat (track 5)
- (2004) Various Artists, "The Spirit Lives On - The Music Of Jimi Hendrix Revisited" (Vol. 2), Angel (track 3)
- (2007) Various Artists, "Warmth in the Wilderness- A Tribute to Jason Becker", "Higher" (track 5)
- (2009) Various Artists, "Guitars That Ate My Brain", Hybrid Angels (track 3)
- (2010) Various Artists, "New World Man, A Tribute To Rush", New World Man (track 1), Fly By Night (track 3), Force Ten (track 8)
- (2013) Omnisight, "Heavy Weather", guest solo
- (2014) Andy Martongelli - "Spiral Motion", guest appearance on Bite the Bullet (track 10)
- (2015) Ingrid Mapson - "Rhythms Of Your Heart", guest appearance on Regresa A Mi (track 5)

== See also ==
- List of Berklee College of Music alumni
- List of Canadian musicians
- List of guitarists
- List of people from Ontario
- List of people from Vancouver
- List of record producers
- Music of Ontario
- Music of Vancouver
