= Ken Parker (guitar maker) =

American luthier (1952–2025)

- Born: August 25, 1952; New Haven, Connecticut, U.S.
- Died: October 5, 2025 (aged 73); Gloucester, Massachusetts, U.S.
- Occupation: Inventor; luthier

Kenneth Murray Parker (August 25, 1952 – October 5, 2025) was an American luthier known for his unique archtop guitars and the Parker Fly electric guitar which came out in 1993. He was the founder of Parker Guitars.

== Life and career ==
Born in New Haven, Connecticut on August 25, 1952, Parker was raised on Long Island, New York, and made his first guitar (out of wood and cardboard) at the age of 13. In his early 20s, after studying various aspects of tool-making and woodworking, he worked in a grandfather clock factory in a Rochester, New York and began building stringed instruments while working with the furniture-maker Richard Newman. Guitar lessons further sparked his interest in the instrument and in the 1970s he returned to the New York City area where he began working with a lute maker on Long Island. He then worked at Stuyvesant Music in Manhattan repairing string instruments. From 1983 he had his own shop where he worked on the development and construction of violins, cellos, and especially Renaissance lutes.

In the early 1990s, he founded the company Parker Guitars and collaborated with Larry Fishman to design the Fly, a controversial, innovative and futuristic electric guitar brought out in 1993. The Fly incorporated non-traditional materials like fiberglass and Carbon-fiber-reinforced polymer blended with more traditional elements like mahogany, basswood and spruce. His tremolo/vibrato design allowed the user to choose between floating or dive only operation, and it could also be used as a stop tail bridge. The Fly weighed around 5 pounds, while most full size solid body electric guitars of the same category usually weigh from 7 to more than 9 pounds. Parker was one of the first builders to use stainless steel frets that were glued on the fretboard. With Larry Fishman's help he was also one of the first builders to embrace the use of a piezo bridge which allowed the electric guitar to simulate the sounds of an acoustic one and blend the acoustic with the electric signal through his innovative control layout. The Fly had 11 patents and was exhibited at the Smithsonian Institution.

Parker sold his company in 2004. A few years later, he started designing archtop guitars. His archtop designs incorporate an adjustable neck that mounts to the guitar via a turnbuckle mechanism that allows the action to be adjusted without affecting the tuning, a unique tailpiece and non-traditional sound holes. As of 2015, Parker had a shop in Massachusetts where he built a small number of hand made and individualized custom archtop guitars per year.

In 2025, Parker retired as a luthier due to failing health from cancer, which he had since 2023.

Parker died at the age of 73 from cancer at his home in Gloucester, Massachusetts, on October 5, 2025. At the time of his death, he resided with his partner, Susan Kolwicz.
