= Charles Arnold Barber =

Canadian architect and inventor

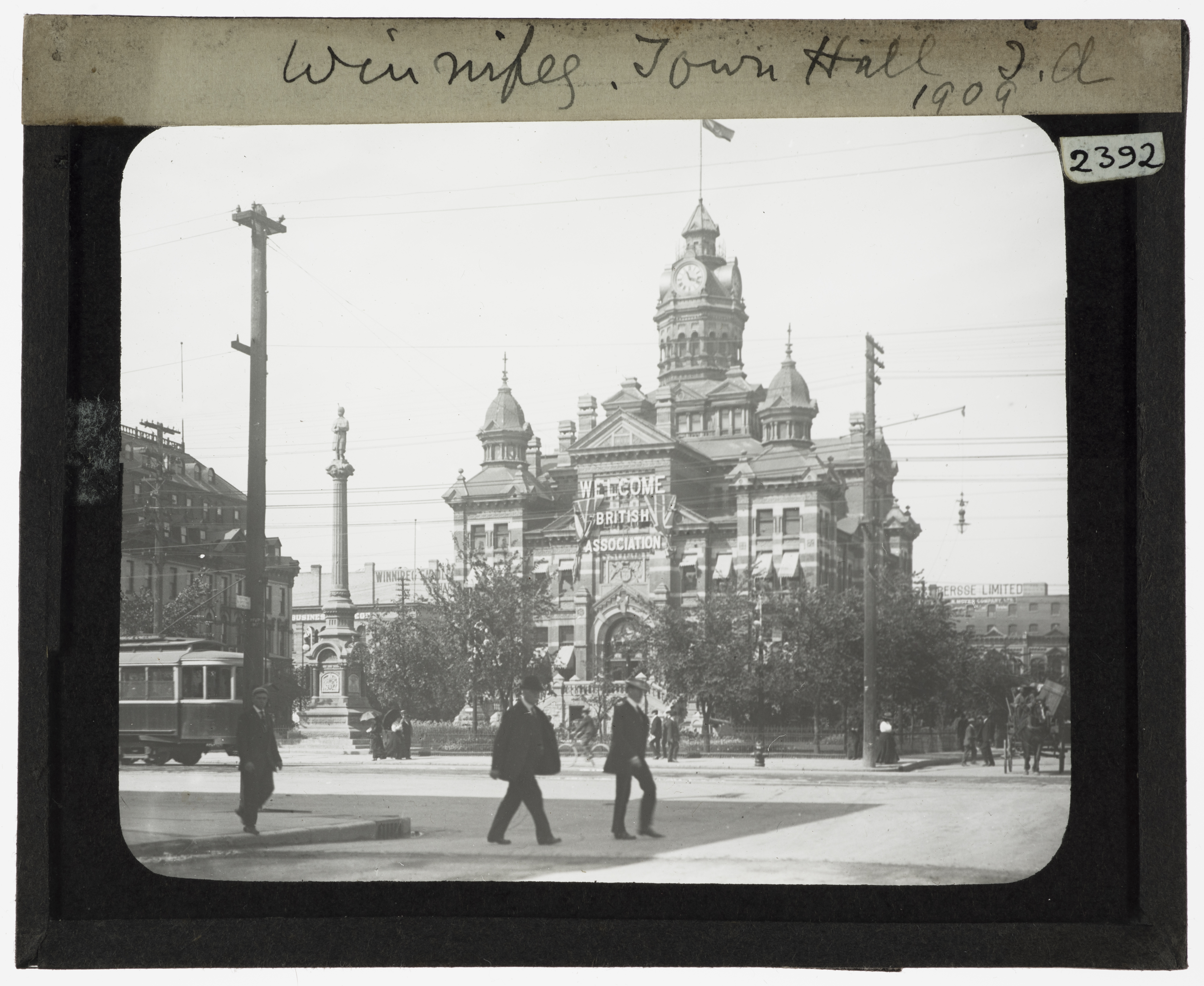
Winnipeg City Hall, completed in 1886

Charles Arnold Barber (9 July 1848 – 22 September 1915) was born in Canada West and was an architect and an inventor although one whose business dealings gave him a somewhat unsavory reputation.

The majority of Barber's architectural work took place in Winnipeg between 1876 and 1898 where he designed schools, colleges, church buildings and office buildings. By 1883, his firm was the largest and most successful in Winnipeg. About that time, he began to acquire a reputation for "shady dealings" and that, along with changing times, affected his business. During his time in Manitoba his firm produced over 100 designs of which 85 were built.

His inventions started seriously in Manitoba and, in 1901, he took his most successful projects, a fireproof door and safe, to Montreal. There, both he and his wife were convicted of extortion.

His architectural work in Winnipeg had a definite influence on the face of that city during a period of rapid growth at the end of the 19th century. His most famous work was Winnipeg City Hall, an eclectic structure said to be "almost beyond architectural description". It survived until the 1960s, when it was replaced by the current, modernist civic centre.

== See also ==
- Matthew Stead, architect, whom Barber worked with for a period
