= George Washburn House =

Historic house in Maine, United States

- U.S. National Register of Historic Places
- U.S. Historic district – Contributing property
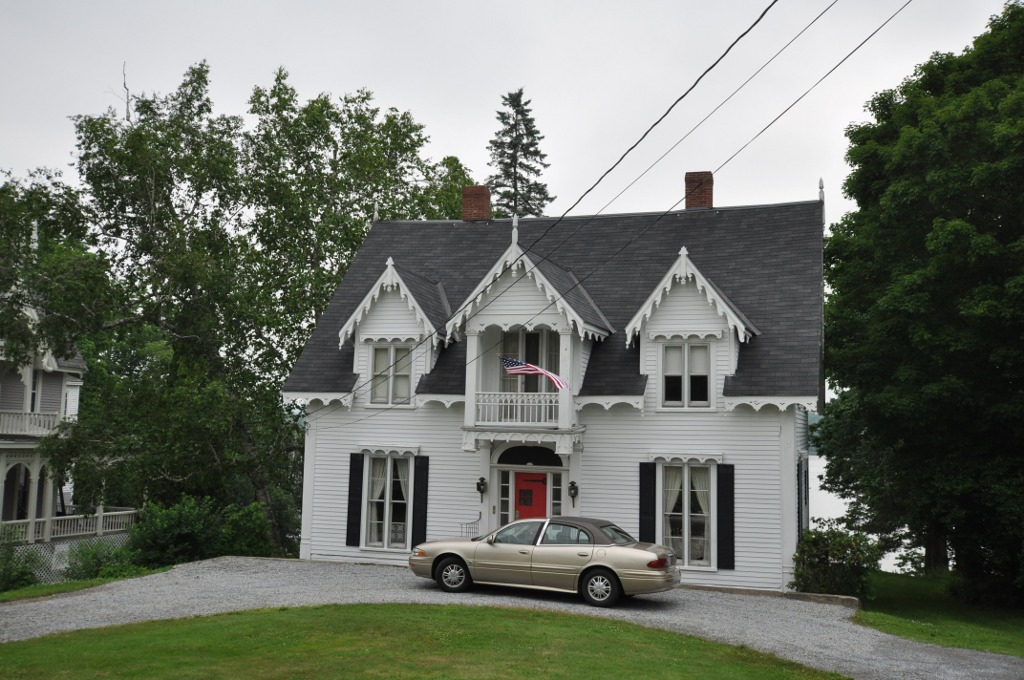

- Location within Maine Location within the United States
- Location: 772 Main Street, Calais, Maine
- Coordinates: 45°10′59″N 67°15′50″W
- Area: 0.3 acres (0.12 ha)
- Built: 1855
- Architectural style: Gothic Revival
- Part of: Hinckley Hill Historic District (ID94001244)
- NRHP reference No.: 82000790

Significant dates
- Added to NRHP: February 11, 1982
- Designated CP: October 28, 1994

The George Washburn House is a historic house at 772 River Road in Calais, Maine. The 1 1/2-story wood-frame house was built c. 1855 by George Washburn, and is one of a trio of Gothic Revival houses standing in a row. One of the others was built by George Washburn's brother Charles; the third, which is the most elaborate, was built by Alexander Gilmore. Nothing of substance is known of the Washburns, or of who built their houses. The George Washburn House was listed on the National Register of Historic Places in 1982, at which time its address was 318 Main Street.

George Washburn's house is three bays wide, with a side gable roof pierced at the ridge by two symmetrically placed chimneys. The main facade is symmetrically arranged with a central entrance flanked by a pair of elongated windows. The entry is slightly recessed, with the door flanked by sidelight windows and topped by a fanlight. The second level consists of three steeply pitched gables, aligned above the entry and windows below. The central gable is covers a small balcony that projects, providing a sheltered area above the entry. The balcony has spindled balusters and a decorative skirt. The gable is supported by square posts, which are joined by a decorative cut-wood valance. The gable end are decorated with bargeboard, with a finial and pendants. The flanking gables are simpler, with paired narrow windows topped by carved projecting lintels. These gable ends are also decorated with bargeboard and a slightly smaller finial and pendant.

At the rear of the house is a porch that was added in 1947 and enclosed in 1962.

== See also ==
- National Register of Historic Places listings in Washington County, Maine
