= Gilmore House (Calais, Maine) =

Historic house in Maine, United States

- U.S. National Register of Historic Places
- U.S. Historic district – Contributing property
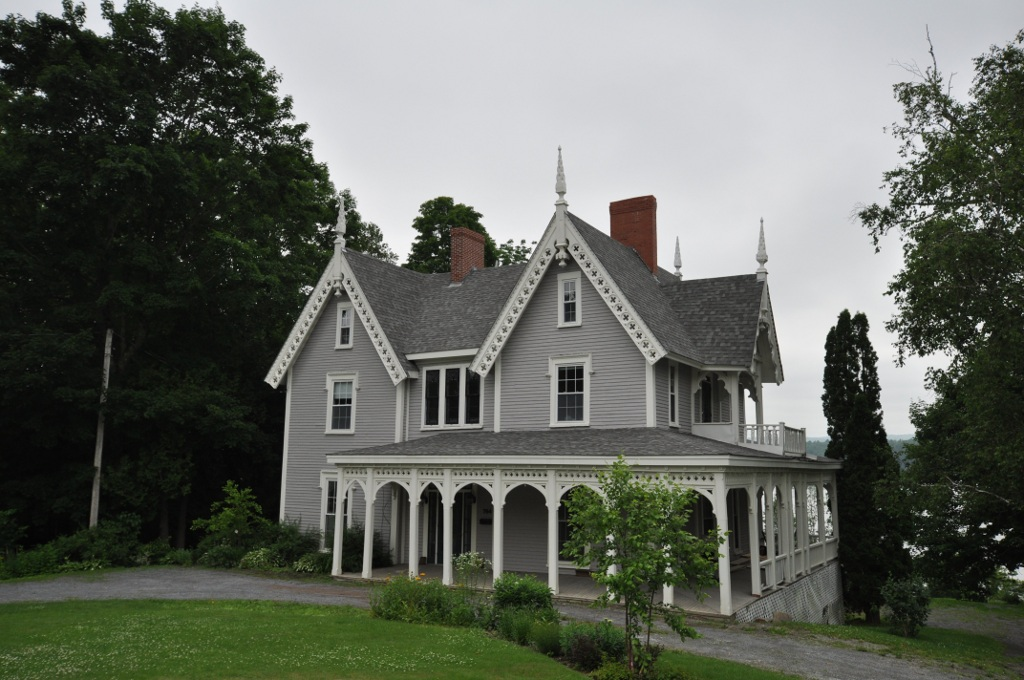

- Location within Maine Location within the United States
- Location: 764 River Road, Calais, Maine
- Coordinates: 45°11′1″N 67°15′51″W
- Area: 0.5 acres (0.20 ha)
- Built: 1850
- Architect: Bassford, B.; Stead, M.
- Architectural style: Gothic Revival
- Part of: Hinckley Hill Historic District (ID94001244)
- NRHP reference No.: 79000380

Significant dates
- Added to NRHP: June 14, 1979
- Designated CP: October 28, 1994

The Gilmore House is a historic house at 764 River Road in Calais, Maine. The 2 1/2-story wood-frame house was designed by New Brunswick architect Matthew Stead and built c. 1850, probably for Alexander Gilmore, an Irish immigrant and local merchant. The house is a remarkably sophisticated execution of Gothic Revival styling, given that at the time of its construction, Calais was essentially a frontier town. It is the most sophisticated of a trio of Gothic Revival houses. It is, like one of its neighbors, the George Washburn House, listed on the National Register of Historic Places, although its address has changed since its listing.

The Gilmore House is a roughly rectangular block, with its main facade facing southeast, and a secondary facade facing southwest, toward the street. Its main roof spine runs parallel to the street, and the street-facing facade has two cross gables flanking a central three-part window on the second level. The gables are decorated with bargeboard, finials, and pendants. Narrow rectangular windows are placed in the gables, and the second-level windows have slender hoods. The first floor is sheltered by a porch which extends across the front of the house, and wraps partway onto the southwest facade. The porch roof is supported by slender columns that are connected by woodwork Gothic arches.

The front of the house is three bays wide. The second level center bay has a balcony, with a projecting gable section partially sheltering it. It is also decoratively enhanced with bargeboard, pendants, and a finial at the top. The northwest and northeast faces of the house are less ornately decorated, but there is still some decorative trim. A two-story addition extends northeast.

== See also ==
- National Register of Historic Places listings in Washington County, Maine
