= Matthew Stead =

English architect

- Born: 1840; Ludford, Shropshire, England
- Died: November 1882 (aged 42)
- Occupation: Architect
- Buildings: A. B. Butler House; Gilmore House

Matthew Stead (1840 – November 1882) was an English architect, active in the second half of the 19th century. Several of his designs are now listed on the National Register of Historic Places in the United States.

== Early life ==
Stead was born in 1840 in Ludford, Shropshire, to Matthew Stead Sr and Mary Ann. His father was an architect who became noted for his work in New Brunswick, Canada. His family emigrated to New Brunswick shortly after Stead Jr's birth. It is believed he trained to become an architect under his father.

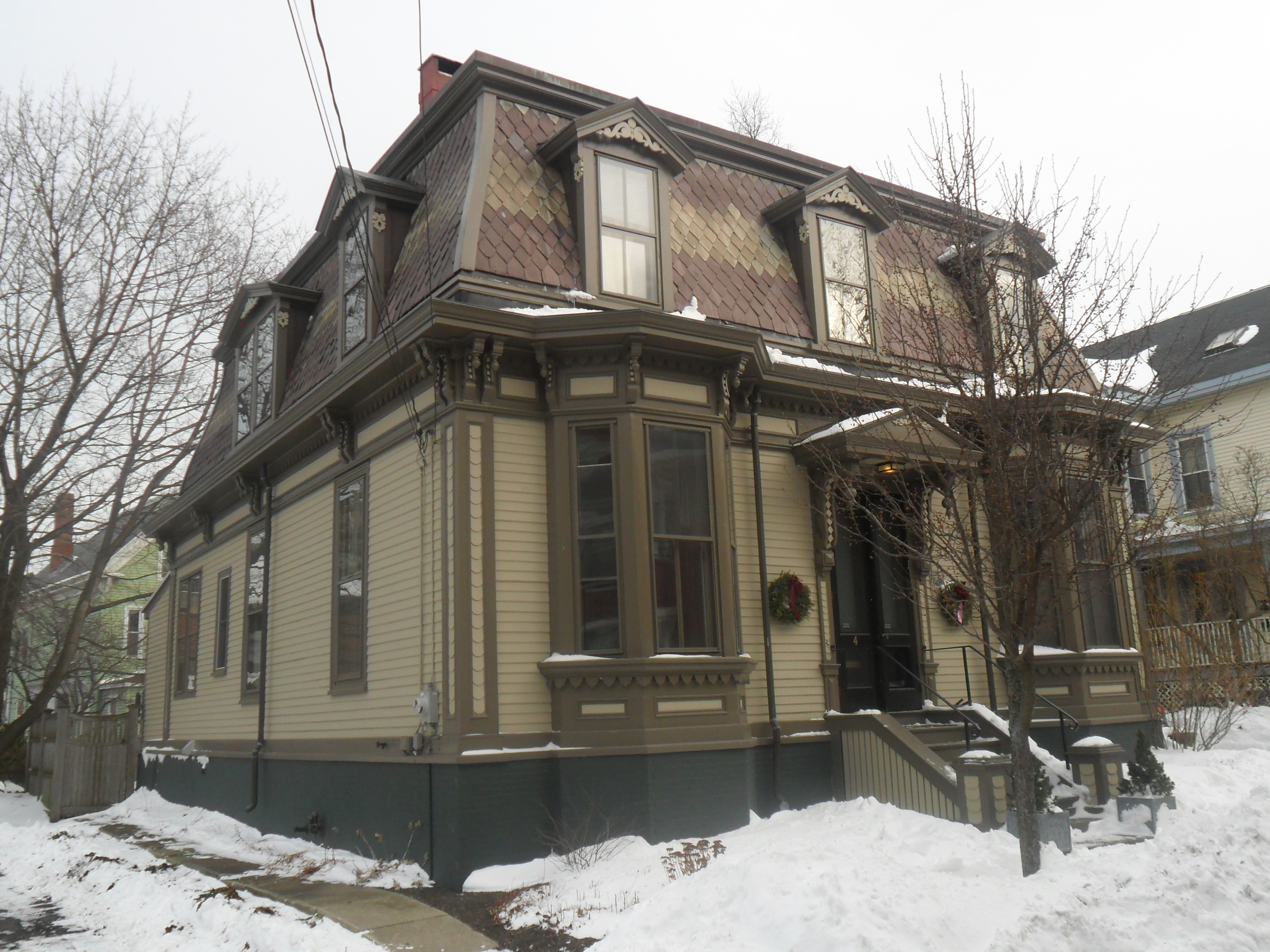
A. B. Butler House in Portland, Maine

== Career ==
Father and son moved to Portland, Maine, in 1866, shortly after its great fire decimated its buildings, and opened a practice there. They remained in Maine for around three years, before returning to Saint John, New Brunswick, in 1869.

Stead Jr began working on his own around 1876, and his father died in 1879. In 1877, another fire, this time in Saint John, saw an uptick in his workload.

He moved to Winnipeg, Manitoba, in 1881, working briefly with Charles Barber.

== Personal life ==
He married Gordon Isabella Sandall in 1865. They had three known children. The family was living in Brighton, Massachusetts, in 1870.

== Death ==
Stead died in 1882, aged 42, after experiencing poor health and alcoholism. He was also admitted to Saint John's lunatic asylum on at least one occasion.

== Selected works ==
- Gilmore House, Calais, Maine (c. 1850) – listed on the National Register of Historic Places
- Cathedral of the Immaculate Conception, Saint John, New Brunswick (1853)
- Merchants' National Bank, Portland, Maine (1867)
- A. B. Butler House, Portland, Maine (1868) – listed on the National Register of Historic Places
