= Washburn Guitars =

American manufacturer and importer of string instruments

- Type: Subsidiary
- Industry: Musical instruments
- Founded: 1883; 143 years ago in Chicago
- Founder: George Washburn Lyon
- Headquarters: Chicago, Illinois, United States
- Area served: Worldwide
- Products: Electric, acoustic & resonator guitars Bass guitars Banjos; Mandolins; Ukuleles; Amplifiers
- Parent: U.S. Music Corp.
- Website: washburn.com

Washburn Guitars is an American brand and importer of guitars, mandolins, and other string instruments, originally established in 1883 in Chicago, Illinois. The Washburn name is controlled by U.S. Music Corp., a subsidiary of Canadian corporate group Exertis | JAM.

== Corporate history ==
=== 1864-1940 ===
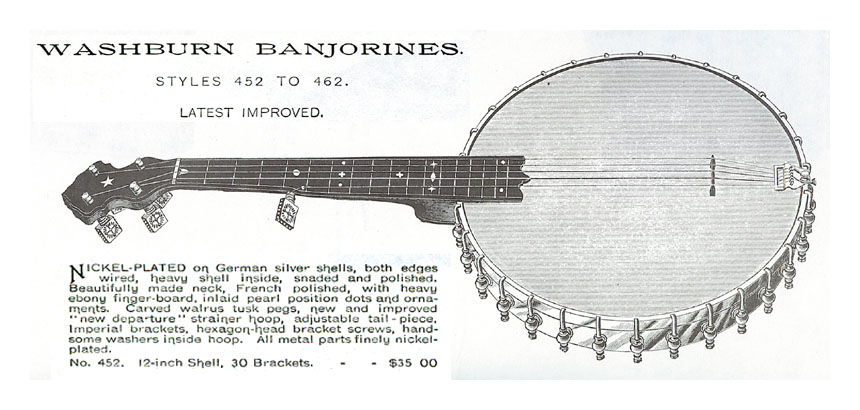
Washburn Banjorine (1892).

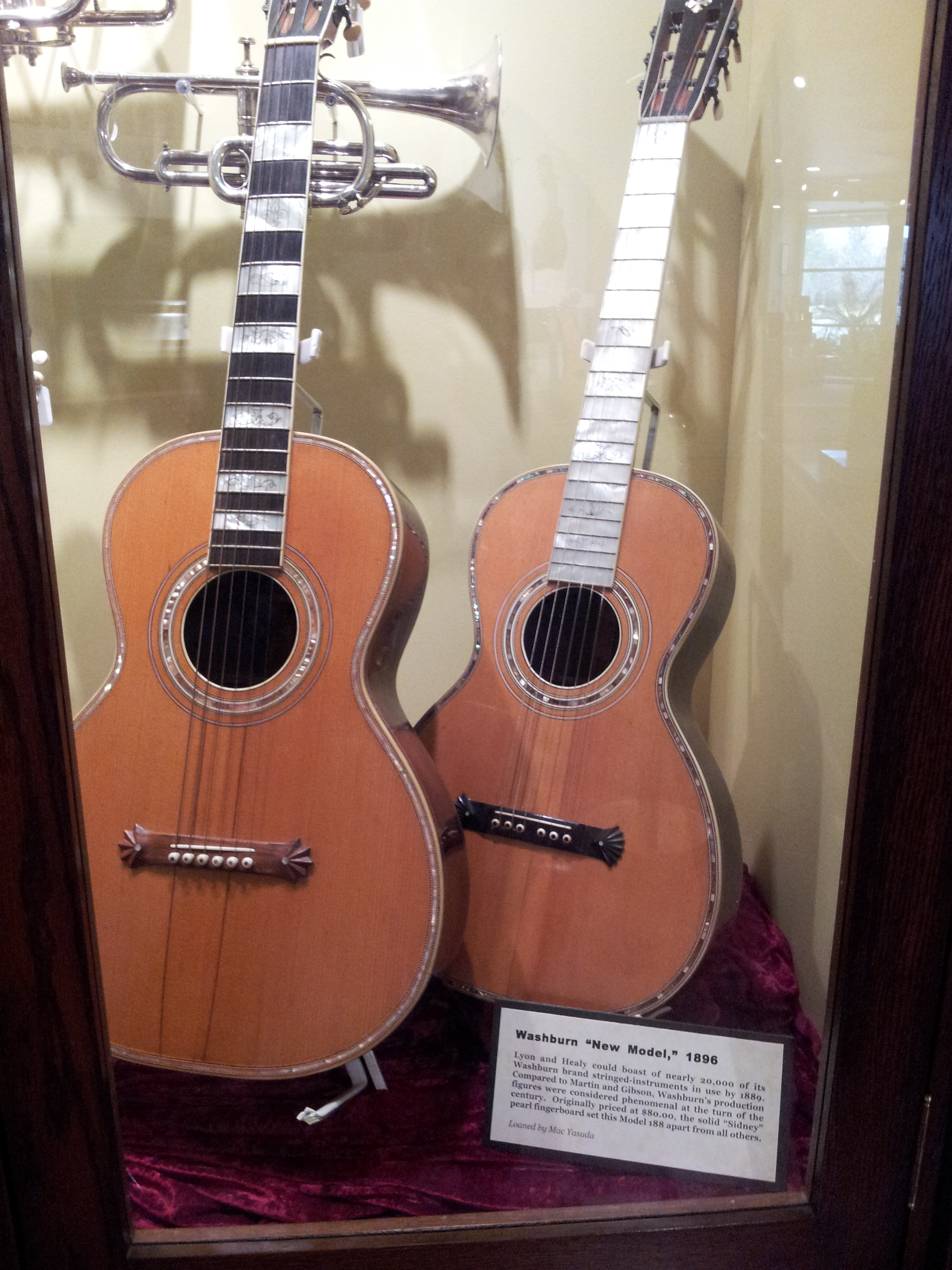
Parlor guitar (1894) and "New Model" (1896), Museum of Making Music.

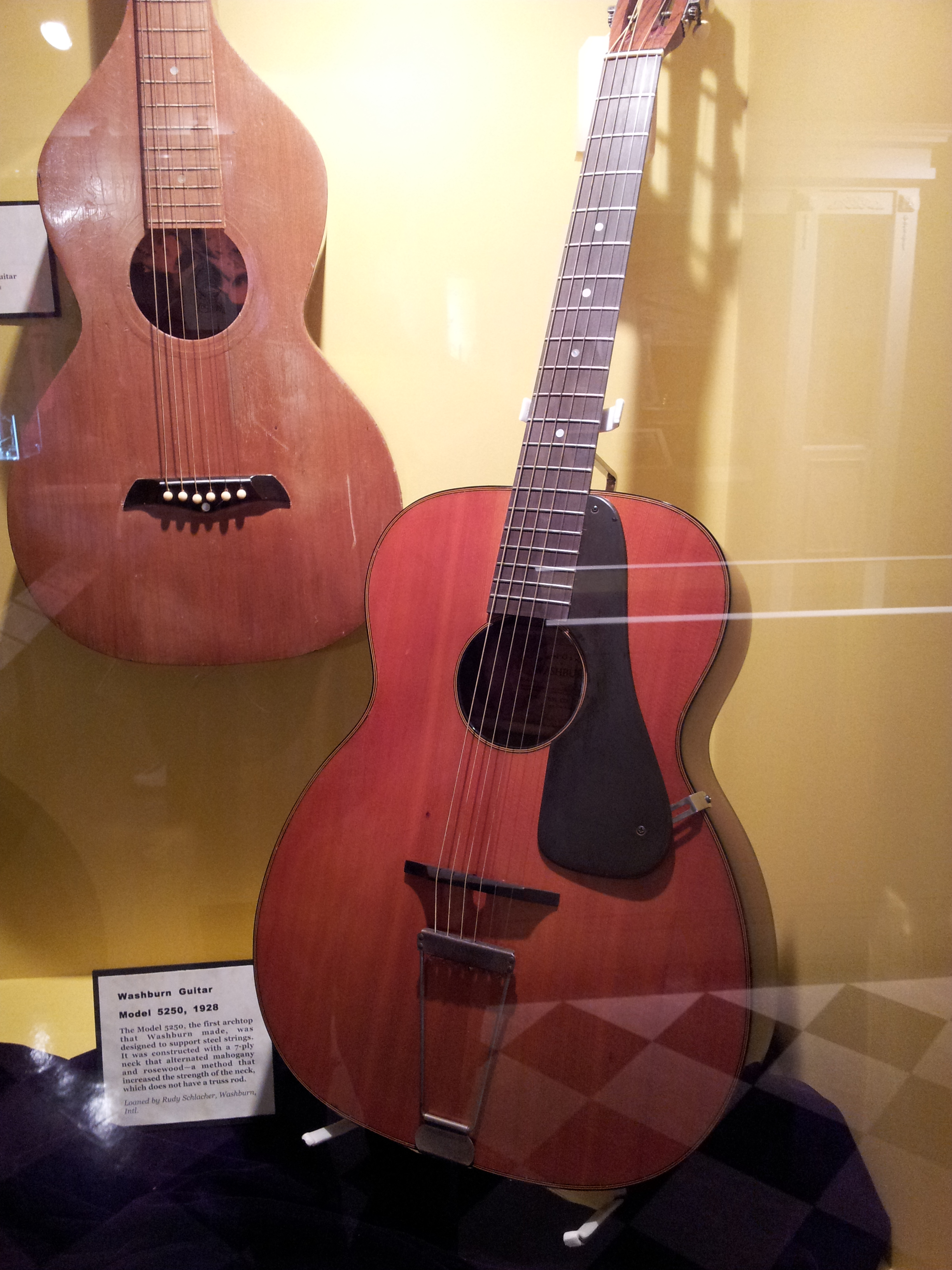
right: archtop guitar model 5250 (1928), Museum of Making Music.

Lyon & Healy began in 1864 as a partnership of businessmen George W. Lyon and Patrick J. Healy, acting as the Chicago outlet for Boston sheet music publisher Oliver Ditson and Company. By 1865, Lyon & Healy had expanded into reed organs and some small instruments. The company achieved independence by 1880, and around 1888 the company launched fully into fretted and plucked instruments (guitars, mandolins, banjos, ukuleles and zithers) under the "George Washburn" brand, which was Lyon's first and middle name. Lyon & Healy 1898 catalog listed 28 different styles of "Washburn" guitars, ranging from $15 to $145.

Tracing the history of any particular instrument of this period presents many obstacles. Not only did the Lyon & Healy company often change designs to follow the rapidly evolving consumer demand, but the company also repaired instruments, and offered engraving services, including decorating instruments that it retailed but did not actually manufacture. As well, they built instruments for other retailers and distributors under various house brands, and outsourced construction of some models.

In 1912, Washburn introduced the Lakeside Jumbo guitar, which some consider the first dreadnought-sized guitar. It bridged the gap between smaller-bodied "parlor" guitars of the late 19th and early 20th century and modern-day dreadnought and jumbo acoustic guitars.

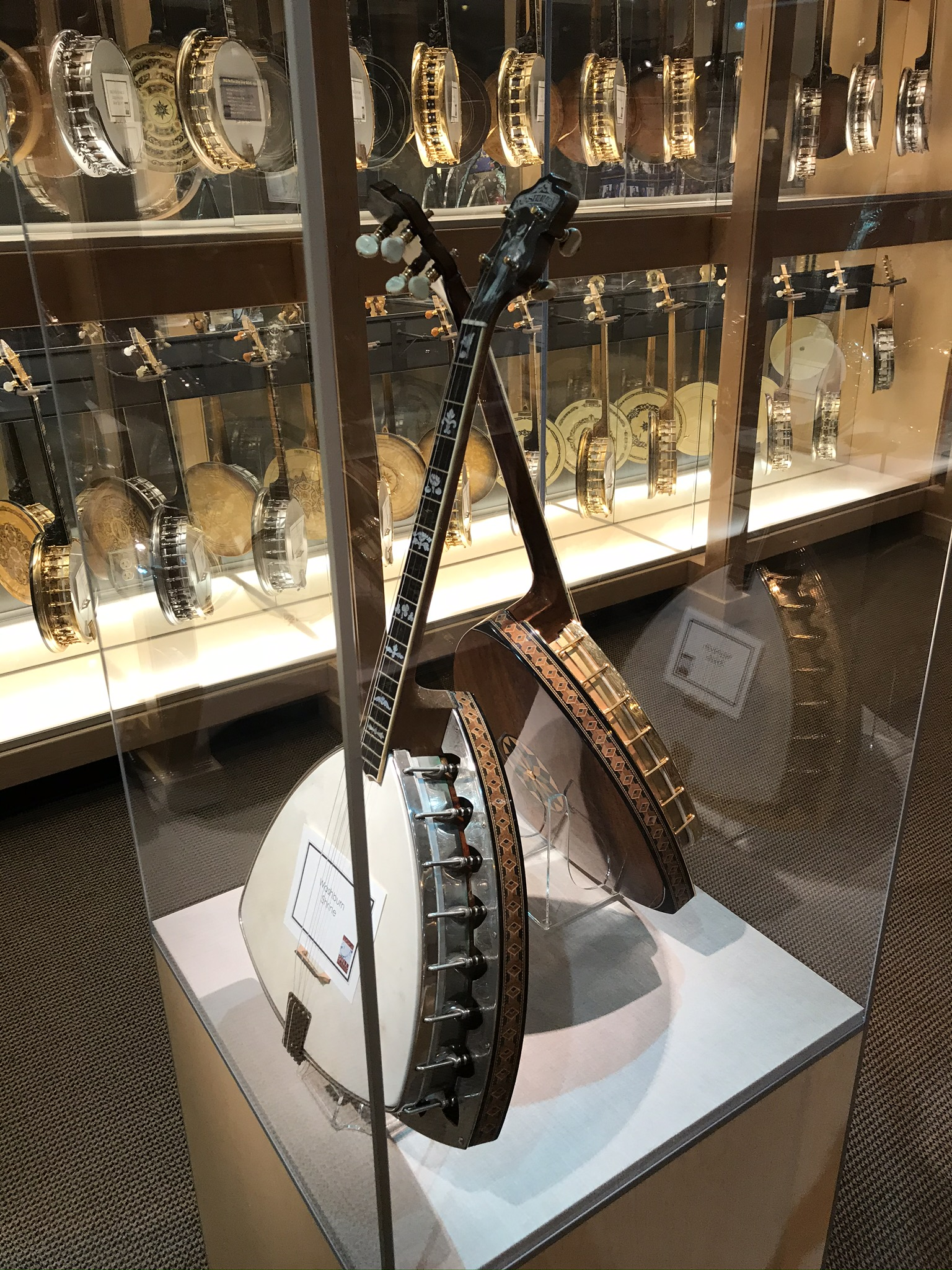
Washburn Shrine banjos at the American Banjo Museum

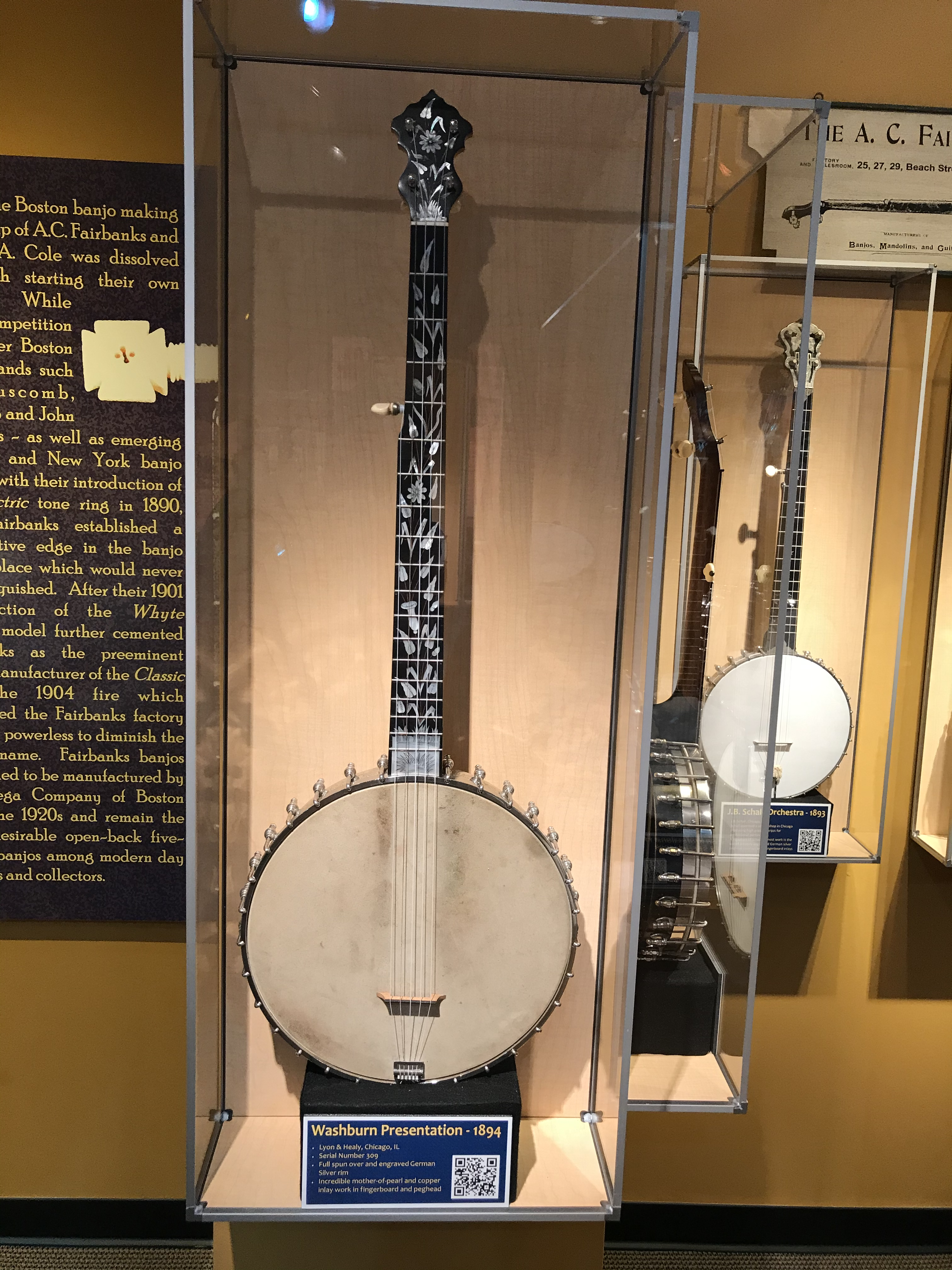
Washburn Presentation Banjo, 1894, American Banjo Museum.

George Lyon retired from the company in 1889 (died 1894). Patrick Healy then led the company into a period of major expansion, beginning with a larger new factory and improved mass-production techniques, and soon dominated the domestic market. Their 1892 catalog claimed to manufacture 100,000 instruments annually. Healy died 1905.

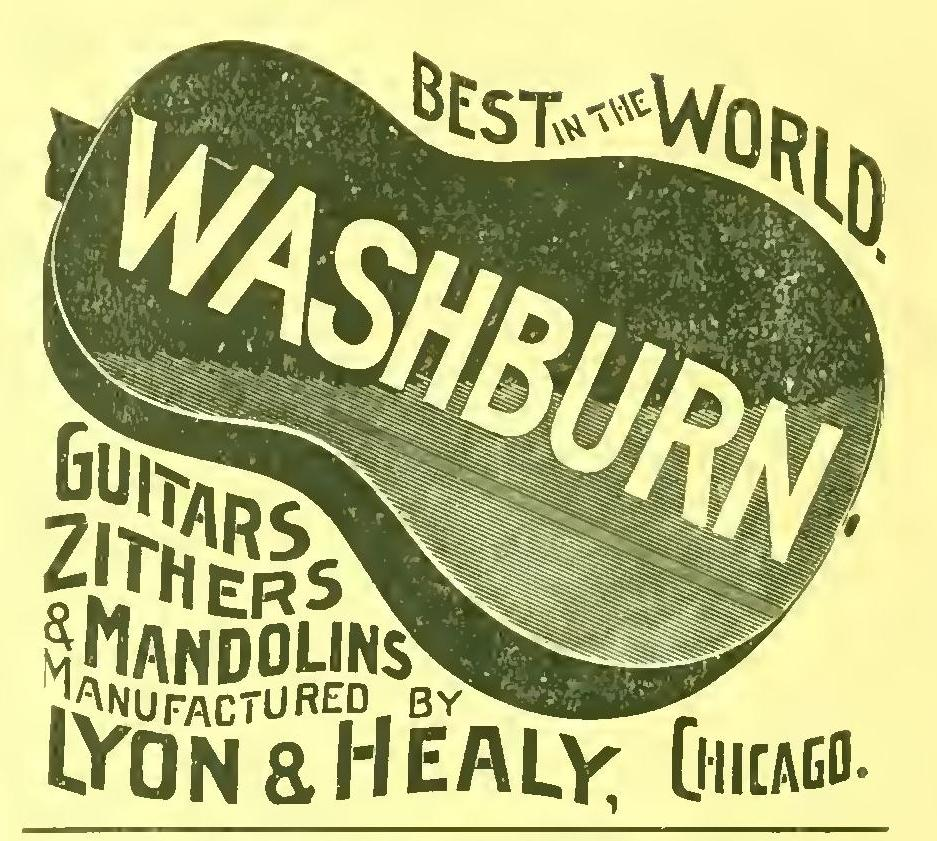
“Washburn guitars, zithers & mandolins manufactured by Lyon & Healy, Chicago Best in the World” ad, 1899

By the 1920s, Lyon & Healy faced growing competition from other instrument manufacturers as well as from the rise of other forms of entertainment, particularly film and the gramophone. Lyon & Healy gradually shifted manufacturing chores onto wholesaler Tonk Brothers, to whom they sold the guitar portion of the business in 1928, continuing to produce their own lines of harps, pianos, and organs.

Tonk Brothers turned to manufacturer J.R. Stewart Company to purchase and operate the massive factory, but this transition proved problematic and Stewart went bankrupt in 1930. Some of the Stewart assets were acquired by the Regal Musical Instrument Company, which had purchased the "Regal" brand name in 1908 from Lyon & Healy (who acquired it in 1905). Regal was chosen to reopen the Washburn factory (producing Regal instruments as well). Though the Washburn brand was preserved, it never regained its preeminence, and by the early 1940s had declined to nothing.

=== Revival ===
An unbroken lineage is often alluded to by Washburn International, in press releases and advertising materials, and on the company website:

Washburn has been building stringed instruments since 1883. … 130 years of history is at the root of our strong foundation building high quality instruments.

However, there is no direct connection between the original Washburn brand and the modern Washburn International.

In the early 1960s, retail store The Chicago Guitar Gallery hired Rudolf "Rudy" Schlacher, a young German violin builder, as a repair technician. A few years later, Schlacher opened The Sound Post in Evanston, Illinois, to focus on guitars. He soon realized the sales potential for quality instruments of modest cost.

Tom Beckmen and his wife Judy Fink Beckmen in 1972 left careers as music salesman and teacher (respectively) to launch a wholesale music business in Los Angeles, Beckmen Musical Instruments. It was Beckmen Music that resurrected the Washburn name, and beginning in 1974 applied it to a series of quality imported acoustic guitars, made in Japan by Kazuyuki Teradaira, as well as a selection of mandolins and banjos.

Fritz Tasch, Rudy Schlacher and Rick Johnstone, as Fretted Industries, Inc., acquired the Washburn name in 1977 (for $13,000) when the Beckmens took their business a different direction, and so the Washburn name was returned to Chicago. With assistance from Ikutaro Kakehashi (founder of Roland Corporation), Schlacher was able to find instrument factories in Japan that could meet the desired standards.

Fretted Industries acquired other lines as well, such as Oscar Schmidt autoharps.

Schlacher bought out Johnstone in 1987, and changed the company name to Washburn International. A stateside manufacturing operation was opened in 1991 for higher-end, short-run, and one-off instruments, as well as development and prototyping. That year, a Chicago Tribune article confidently places Washburn "among the top three guitar manufacturers in the world," behind only Fender and Gibson.

On December 15, 2002, Washburn International announced that it had completed acquisition of U.S. Music Corporation, and would be rolling its assets into that company in a reverse merger. Schlacher remained as CFO, appointing Gary Gryczan to COO; Gryczan had been Washburn's CFO from 1995 through 1998. The new USM's headquarters were in Mundelein (440 E. Courtland Street), which also housed the stateside Washburn luthiery, "the USA Custom Shop," previously located at Elston and Springfield avenues.

Schlacher announced completion of selling USM to JAM Industries on August 24, 2009, and that he would be stepping away from his company after fully four decades.

We are pleased to join forces with a strategic partner like Jam Industries, that has a long, successful history in the music industry and has been a long-term business partner with U.S. Music for more than 20 years. It has been a thrilling and rewarding 40-year ride that has allowed me to realize my dreams and goals.

As R S Consulting he remained a consultant to the musical-instrument industry and was an executive producer for a small-budget film

The corporate offices of U.S. Music were relocated to Buffalo Grove, Illinois in 2012.

== Production ==
Very few modern Washburn instruments have been built by the company itself. It has relied on outside factories and luthiers to fulfill their designs and meet public demand.

The first modern Washburn instruments were full-size acoustic guitars imported from Japan by Beckmen Music. The 1974 range included one folk-style guitar (W-200) and eight dreadnoughts of increasing quality and decoration: W-240-12, W-250, W-260, W-280, W-300, W-300-12, W-500, W-600.

Under Rudy Schlacher, most Washburn models were ordered in runs of 200 units, rather than ongoing production; if sales went well, further runs might be ordered. This application of just-in-time manufacturing (or lean manufacturing) kept the company from needing to warehouse and liquidate overproduction, improving profitability. As a result, Washburn models (acoustic or electric) sometimes became difficult to locate between production runs.

The first Washburn electric guitars were the Wing Series models, offered 1978–1984. These instruments featured innovative push-pull split humbuckers, brass hardware and inlays, and neck-through construction. Some early Wing Series were produced by Yamaki, one Japanese manufacturer of Washburn acoustic guitars.

By 1991, production of Washburn instruments had shifted almost entirely to Korea, built by Samick. When Samick opened their Cileungsi, Indonesia, facility in 1992, this factory also began to produce Washburn-branded instruments, generally identifiable by an "SI-" serial number prefix.

From 1992 to 2000 Washburn housed the USA Custom Shop in a factory at Elston and Springfield avenues. Grover Jackson ran production for the first half of the 1990s and Larry English ran production for the second half of the 1990s.

Between 1994 and 2001, ten models of acoustic guitar were built for Washburn in the United States, five by Tacoma Guitars (Tacoma, Washington) and five by Bourgeois Guitars (Lewiston, Maine).

Washburn brought out a line of four USA-made dreadnoughts, available from 2002 to 2008. These were the D-78, D-80, D-82, and D-84. (All had the "-SW" suffix, for "solid wood," indicating that no laminate wood was employed.)

In 2012, when JAM Industries declined to renew the lease on the Mundelein facility, the Washburn luthiery closed. At the time, the Washburn facility was the ninth-largest employer in the village (the third-largest business), providing 180 jobs. The stated intent was to reopen at a smaller building in Buffalo Grove (1000 Corporate Grove Drive) but this did not materialize. A few Washburn models (particularly the N4) are produced in Cincinnati.

As of 2017, primary production has largely shifted from Korea to factories in Indonesia and China.

== Innovations ==
Most widely known for its guitars (both electric and acoustic), Washburn also makes electric basses, acoustic basses, banjos, mandolins, travel guitars, ukuleles, and amplifiers, as well as accessories including guitar cases, clothing, tuners, and straps.

In the 1980s, Washburn introduced the Festival Series of acoustic/electric guitars (the EA series, for "electrified acoustic"). They were thinner than standard acoustic guitars and less acoustically resonant by design, thereby reducing susceptibility to feedback, a significant problem using acoustic or electrified acoustic guitars in large-venue performances. The addition in later models of sound slots (rather than the traditional round soundhole), a patented innovation, further reduced the possibility of feedback, and the guitars quickly became the go-to stage acoustic for artists such as Jimmy Page, George Harrison, and Bob Dylan. In the early 1990s when MTV introduced their Unplugged series, hardly a show went by without seeing a Festival Series guitar. The design also lent itself well to acoustic basses, and Washburn's AB Series quickly became popular both for its look and its tone, whether amplified or unplugged.

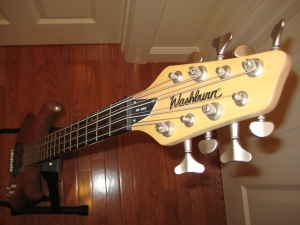
Headstock of a Washburn RB2802 eight-string bass.

In recent years, Washburn licensed several guitar construction features:

- the Buzz Feiten Tuning System — a corrected temperation tuning formula, using a compensated nut and saddle to minimize the inherent intonation problems of the Western tuning formula. The BFTS was first used by Washburn in 1995 on a very few models, then increasingly with the introduction of the WI-64 (1999), and was entirely phased out after the 2010 production year. At its peak, this system came standard on U.S.-made Washburn guitars and basses and the better imports.
- Stephen's Extended Cutaway — a unique bolt-on neck joint invented by luthier Stephen Davies to allow greater unrestricted access for a guitarist's fretting hand. Used primarily with the Nuno Bettencourt signature models, the SEC has also been employed with acoustic guitars, and remains on some current (2017) models of the Parallaxe line.
- Voice Contour Control (VCC) — a special potentiometer and wiring, intended to allow access to the entire range of tones "between" the one-coil ("single-coil" mode) and two-coil sounds of a humbucking pickup, rather than one or the other.

VCC is similar to coil splitting, in that it changes the tone of a humbucking pick-up to that of a single coil, but it does it by turning the tone knob … without the hum normally associated with single coils.

Designed by Trevor Wilkinson, the VCC is no longer in use by Washburn, but is available in various models of Vintage (UK) guitar as the "Roll Control" knob.

== Model number suffixes ==
Over the past 40 years, Washburn has accreted a system of identifying some of the most pertinent features in many of its acoustic instruments and some of the electric. Additional letters may be used to indicate the instrument's finish. While imperfectly applied, and sometimes awkwardly long, this can often be useful in identifying a given guitar.

suffix —

- C - cutaway
- DL - deluxe (generally, a standard model with a few upgraded features)
- E - electric (i.e., built-in pickup)
- K - kit (i.e., includes case or gig bag)
- LH - left-handed
- M - mahogany top
- Q - quilt maple top
- R - rosewood
- S - solid-wood top (rather than laminate)
- SP - spalt maple top
- SW - solid wood used throughout
- V - vibrato (on electric guitars)

This often combines with the prefix to tell a guitar's story. For example, the WLG110SWCEK indicates that it's part of the Woodline series (WL-), likely top of the line (110), Grand Auditorium (G) size, all solid wood, cutaway, piezo pickup, and originally included a case.

== Past and present models ==
Any given series may have as few as only one model.

=== Electric guitars ===
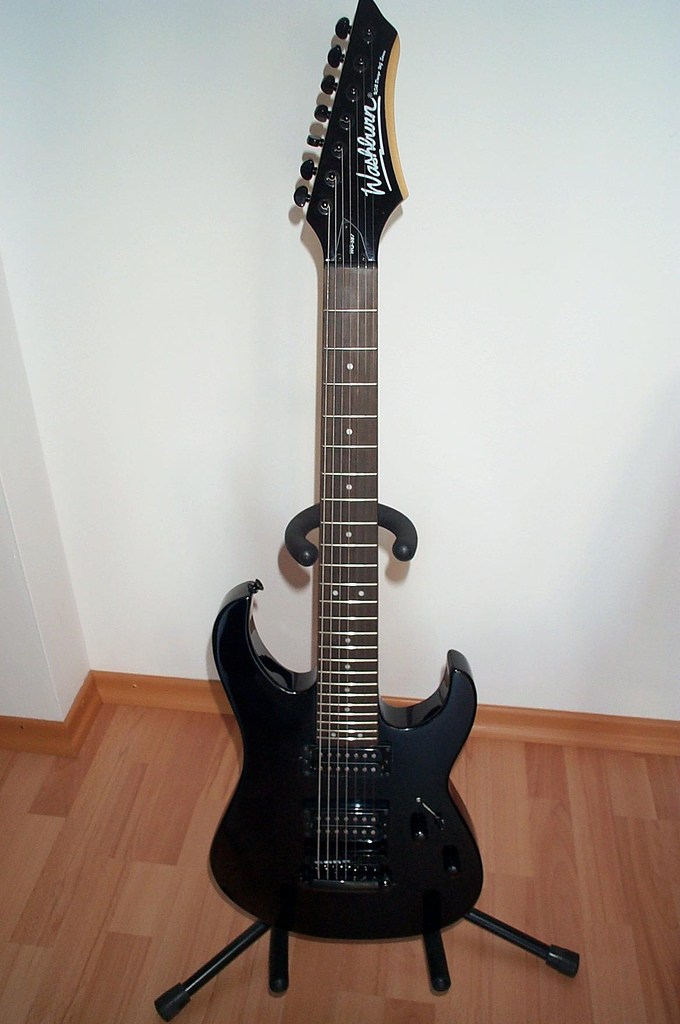
WG587 7-string guitar.

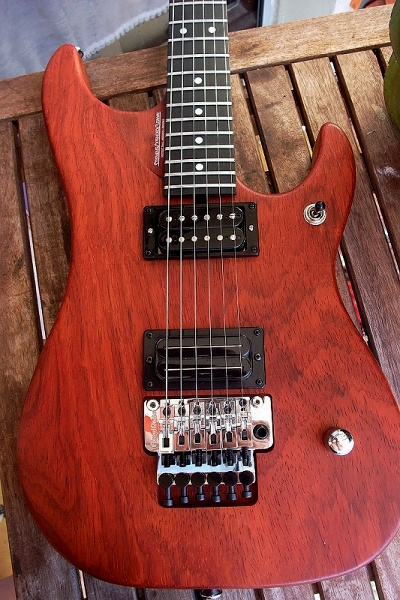
N4 Special

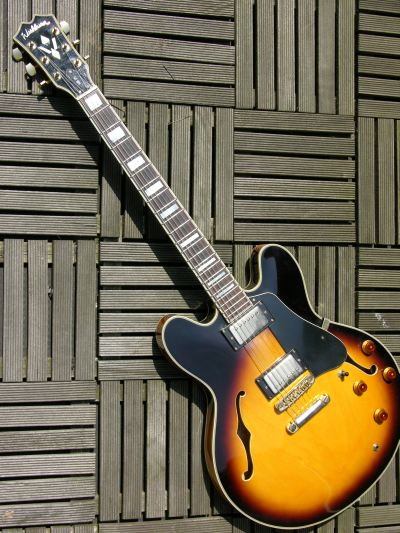
HB35.

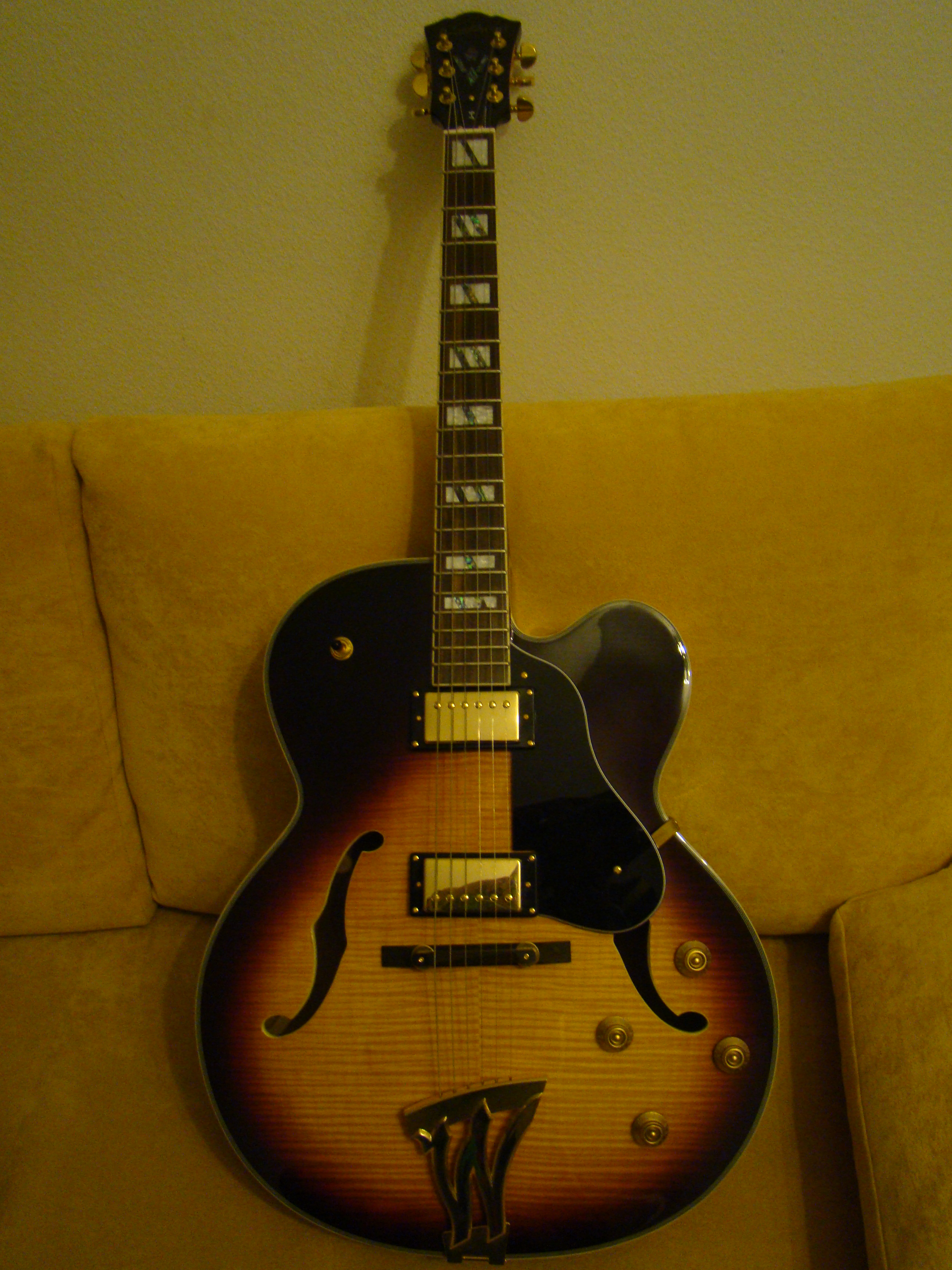
J5 Jazz guitar.

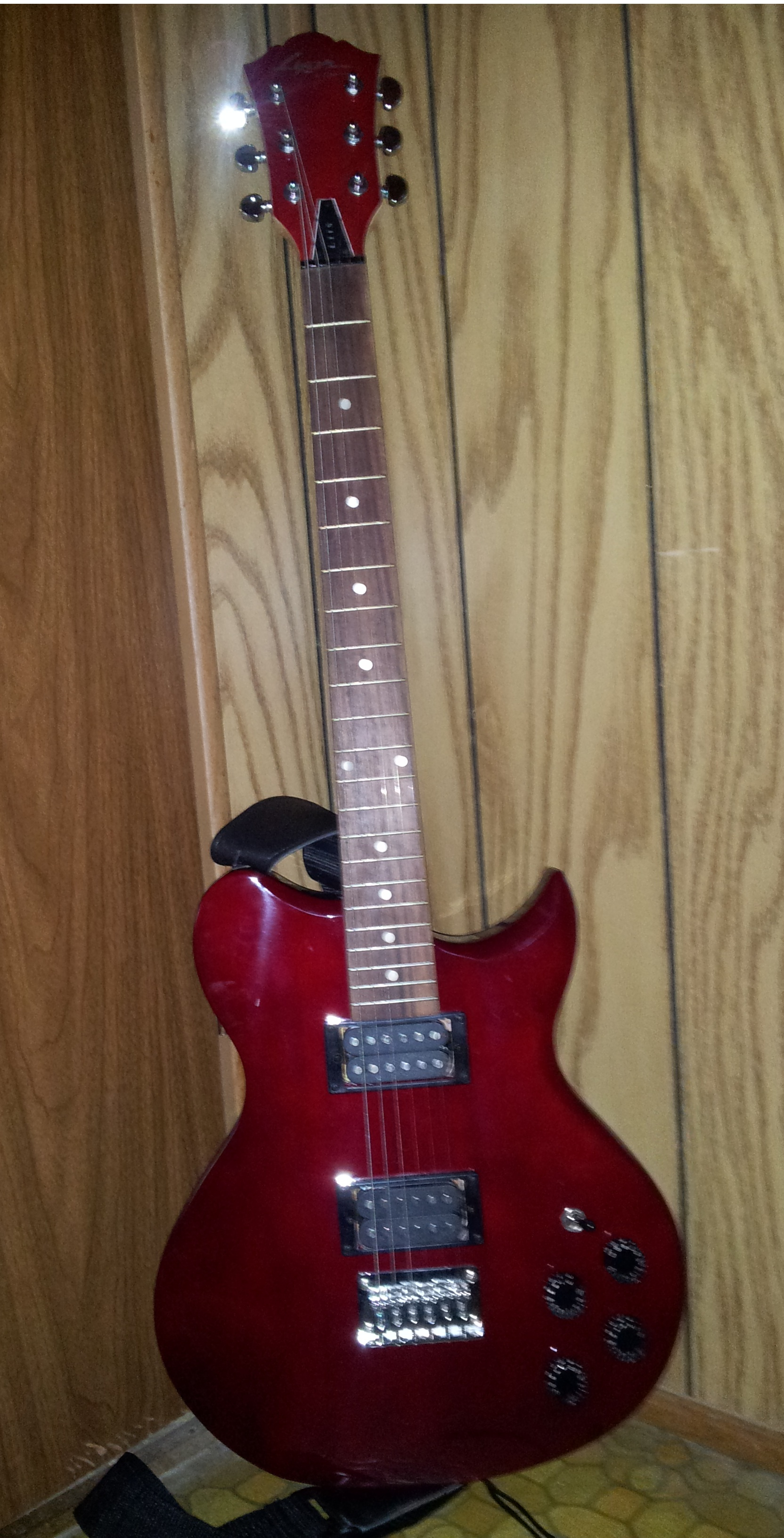
Lyon by Washburn.

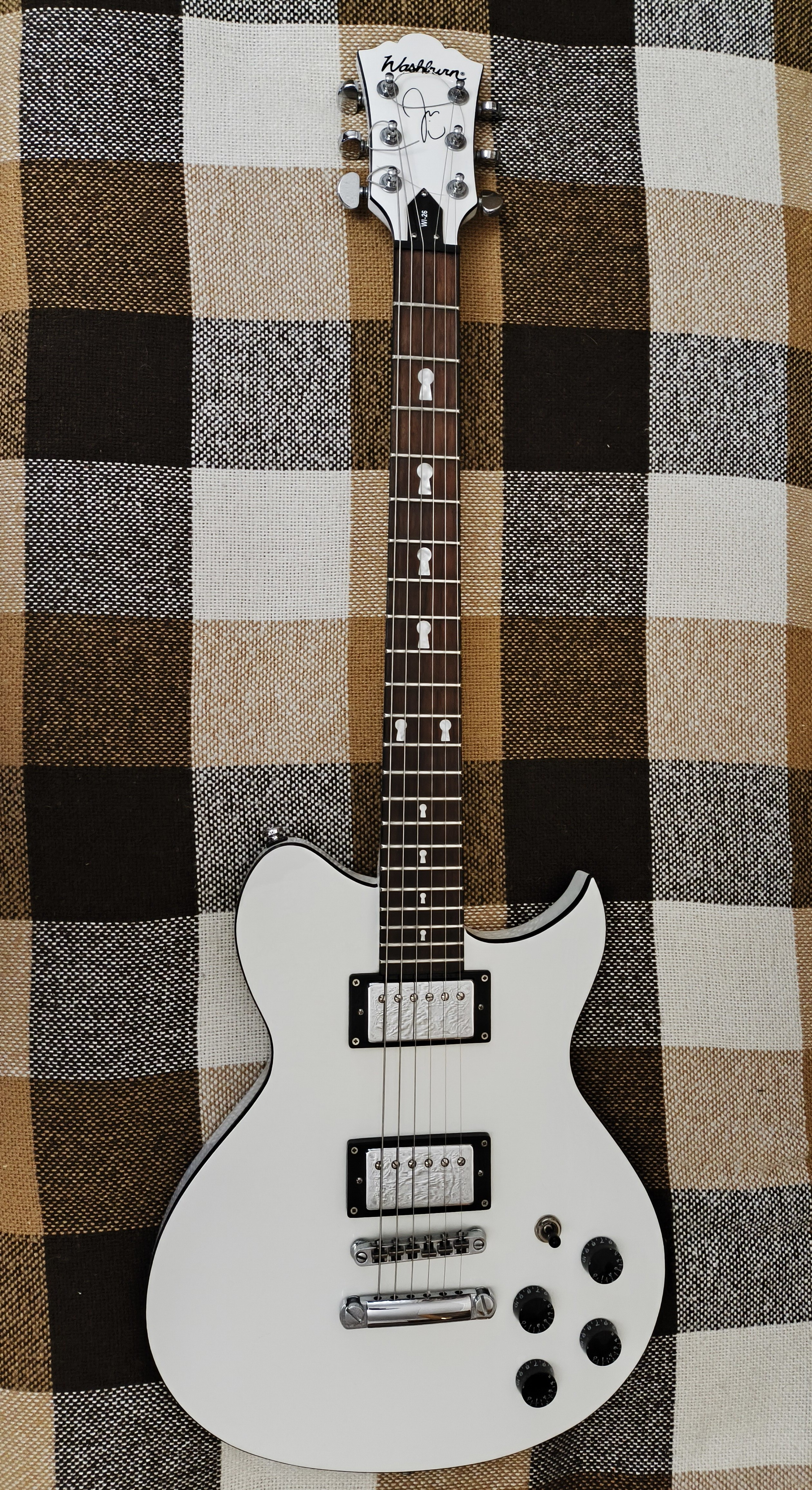
WI26 Joe Trohman.

prefix	Series	a.k.a.	type	duration	comments
J		Jazz	hollowbody archtop	1989–date	
HB		Hollow Body	semihollow archtop	1981–date	
B	Bantam		headless bass	1984–1986	no connection to 1990s Bantams
GB	Bantam		headless bass/guitar	1984–1986	no connection to 1990s Bantams
G	Bantam		headless guitar	1984–1986	no connection to 1990s Bantams
CT	Centurian		carved-top	1997–2002	
P	Centurian		carved-top	1997–2002	
E	Centurian		carved-top	2001–2002	
CP	Culprit			1998–2000	
Dime	Dimebag Darrell		ML-style	1995–2004	signature line
G	Force			1983–1988	
CS	Hard Rock			2000–2002	
NX	Nextar			2002–2003	Stephen's Extended Cutaway
PT		Poptop		2000–2002	
RS	Hard Rock	Rogue Star		2000–2002	
WG	Hard Rock			2000–2002	
WR	Hard Rock			2000–2002	
WI	Idol			1999–2010	
WM	HM			2008–2010	no connection to 1990s WM
WV	Heavy Metal	Wavepoint; Vee		2008–2010	
WIN	Idol			2010–2014	
JB	Jennifer Batten			2000–2004	signature line
KC	Chicago			1989–1991	
LS	Laredo	Legacy; Silverado	S copy	1992–1994	
LT	Laredo	Legacy; Silverado	T copy	1993–1994	
MR	Magnum			1997–2000	
BT	Maverick	BillyT; Bantam		1995–2002	all 24.75" scale
WM	Maverick			1997–2002	USA build; no connection to 2008 WM
DD	Maya	Dan Donegan		2005–2010	signature line
MG	Mercury			1992–1996	
NC	Nick Catanese			2005–2009	signature line
N	Nuno Bettencourt			1990–2025	Stephen's Extended Cutaway
PS	Paul Stanley			1998–2016	signature line
RX	RX			2011–date	
SI	Scott Ian			2005–2010	signature line
A	Stage			1980–1986	
EC	Extended Cutaway			1988–1991	Stephen's Extended Cutaway
SS	Steve Stevens			1993–1994	
AF	Tour	Ace Frehley		1987–1988	signature line
FV	Tour	Flying Vee		1984–1985	
HM	Tour			1985–1987	
RR	Tour			1985–1987	
RS	Tour			1987–1988	
WP	Tour	Paul copy		1987–1991	
WT	Tour			1984–1994	
	Wing			1978–1985	
SB	Wing Reissue			1991–1995	
X	X			2002–2010	
XM	XM			2011–date	
S	Sonamaster			2016–date	
PX	Parallaxe			2013–date	
PXM	Parallaxe			2013–date	
PXS	Parallaxe			2013–date	
PXL	Parallaxe		LP shape	2013–date	
TB	Tabu			2009	
WB	Lyon		S copy	1994–1995	

=== Basses ===
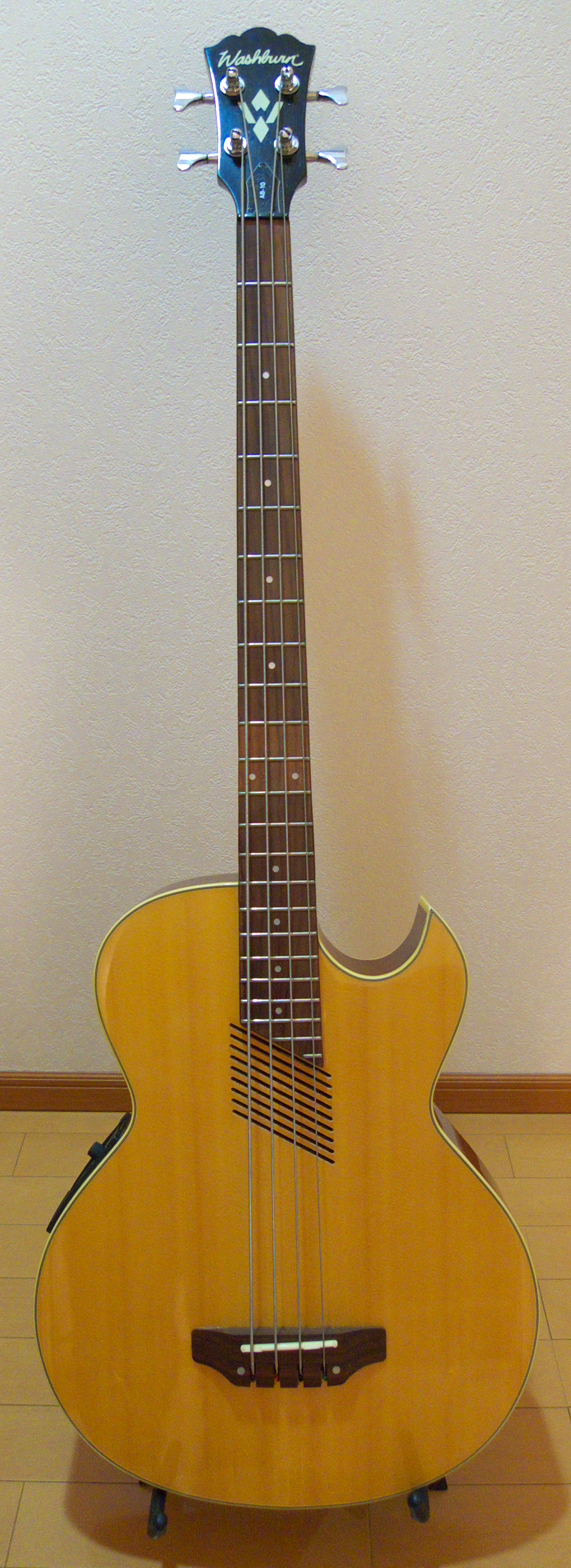
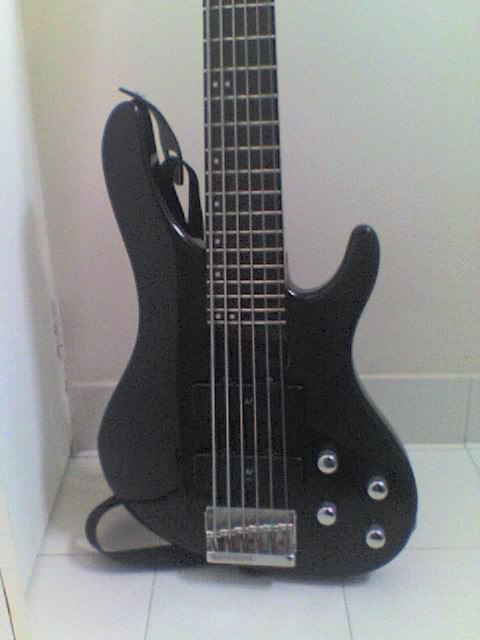
left: AB-10 acoustic bass.
right: XB-600 6-string bass (right).

prefix	Series	a.k.a.	type	duration	comments
B				1983–1985	
B				1992	
	Wing	Scavenger		1980–1981	
B	Stage			1981–1984	
B	Stage			1981–1984	
B	Force		P copy	1983–1986	
B	ABT			1987–1989	
XS	Axxess			1990–1991	
BB	Bantam			2006–2010	
XB	Bantam			1994–2006	
MB	Mercury			1992–1993	
MB	Mercury			2002–2006	
RB	RB			1999–2003	
WP	Shadow		P copy	1997–1999	
WJ	Shadow		J copy	1997–1999	
S	Status 1000			1988–1993	
SHB	Stu Hamm			2012–2016	signature
T	Taurus			2002–date	
AB				2004–2006	
	Bootsy Collins	Space Bass		2002–2006	
CB				2007–2010	
DB				2000	
	Force			2002–2010	
M				2002–2003	
WB	Idol			2007–2010	
SB	Sonamaster			2016–date	
AB	Festival	Acoustic		1988–date	

=== Acoustic guitars ===
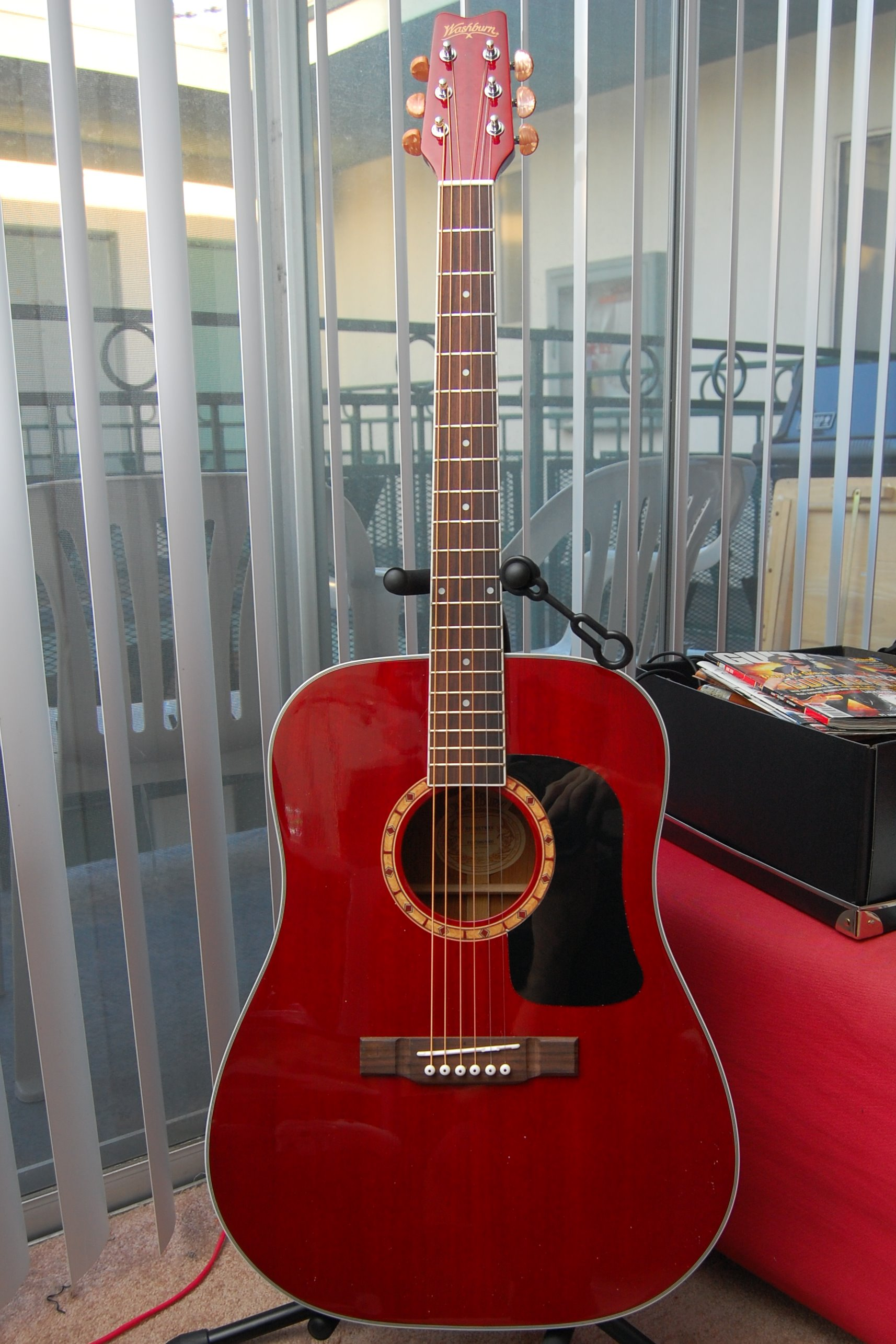
D100DL acoustic.

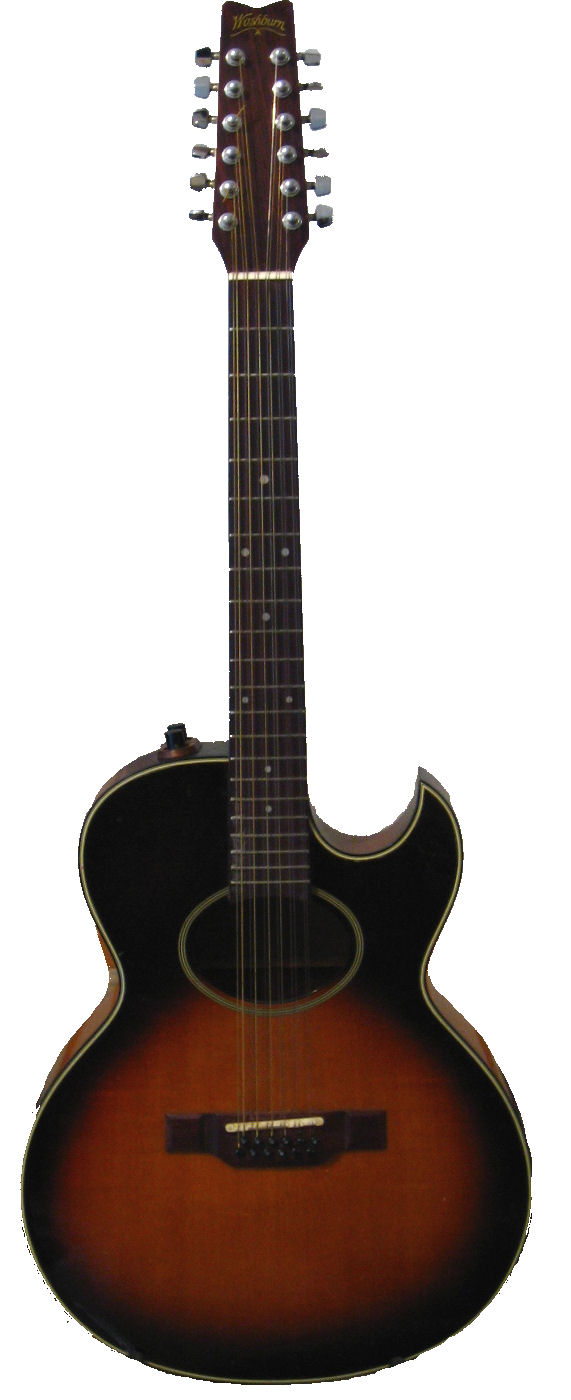
12-string acoustic electric

prefix	Series	shape	duration	type	comments
RW	Roger Waters		2004	acoustic/electric	RW300 signature (USA)
D		dreadnought	1978–2010		
WD		dreadnought	2011–date		
R	125th Anniversary	parlor	2008–2009		
WSJ	125th Anniversary	southern jumbo	2008–2009		
D		southern jumbo	1985–2000		
F		folk	1978–2010		
WF		folk	2012–date		
WG		grand auditorium	2011–date		
J		jumbo	1991–2010		
SJ		southern jumbo	2004–2005		
WB		baby jumbo	2007–2010		
WJ		jumbo	2011–date		
PS	Paul Stanley	dreadnought	2007		
PS	Paul Stanley	folk	2007		
PR	Prairie State	1920s	2002–2003		
DC		dreadnought	1987–1994		Stephen's Extended Cutaway

== Endorsers ==
Washburn uses the mechanism of endorsements, where:

- Manufacturer provides custom-shop instrument that suits the artist best, for free (or even paying artist).
- Artists promotes his or her usage of that instrument and advertises manufacturer company.

The current list of Washburn Signature endorsers.
Standard Washburn Endorsers.

== Product lineup ==
=== 2017 Signature Lines ===
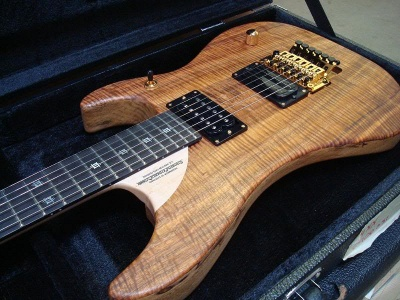
N4 XX anniversary edition.

- Nuno Bettencourt models are flagshipped by the American hand-made N4. The N4 is a small reverse-headstock "super-strat" that features the Stephen's Extended Cutaway neck joint for easy access to the higher frets. It is outfitted with a Bill Lawrence and a Seymour Duncan pickup, and a licensed Floyd Rose-type tremolo. The N1 and N2 are production (budget) models of this line, factory-built in Korea, and feature standard bolt-on necks and lower-grade pickups and tremolo systems. The N3 (discontinued) was also produced in Korea and sported the Stephen's Extended Cutaway but used lower-grade pickups.
  Bettencourt has endorsed several Washburn acoustic models as well. There is the N7 7-string model, and an acoustic/electric based on the Festival Series, the EA20SNB.
- Ola Englund Solar (2013/2014): Signature model announced by Washburn in 2013 for Swedish guitarist Ola Englund of Six Feet Under, Feared, and The Haunted.
- Warren Haynes - vocalist and guitarist, Gov't Mule, The Allman Brothers, and the Warren Haynes Band. The Washburn WSD5249 acoustic guitar is based on the original Washburn Solo Deluxe from 1937, which is similar in size to the popular OM shaped guitars on the market today. Adirondack Spruce top with period-correct vintage sunburst finish. Hand-shaped scalloped Adirondack Spruce bracing, solid rosewood sides, 2-piece back with vintage-inspired 1930s zipper-style inlaid herringbone stripe. The top has 3-ply ivoroid binding and the sound hole is finished by a ringed herringbone rosette.

=== Previous signature instruments ===
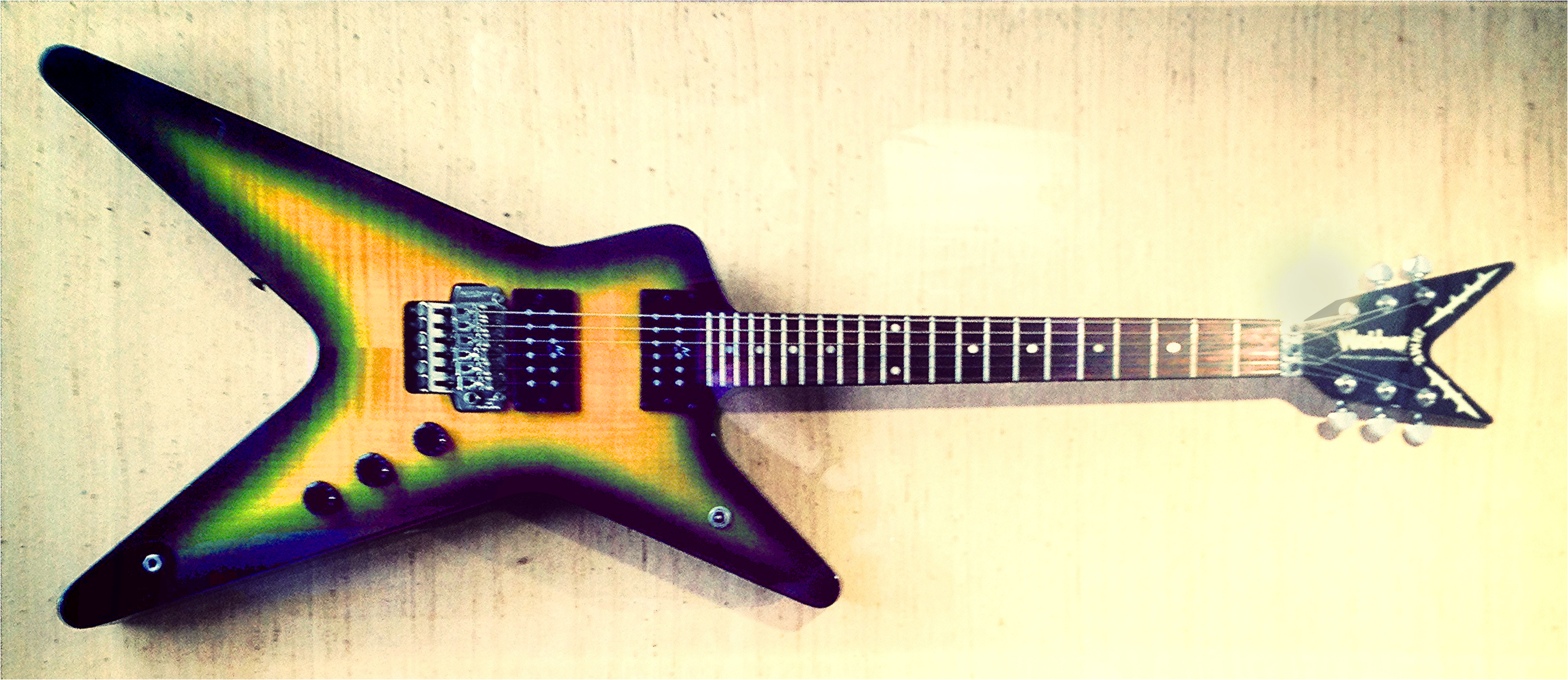
DIME 333 (Dean ML-style).

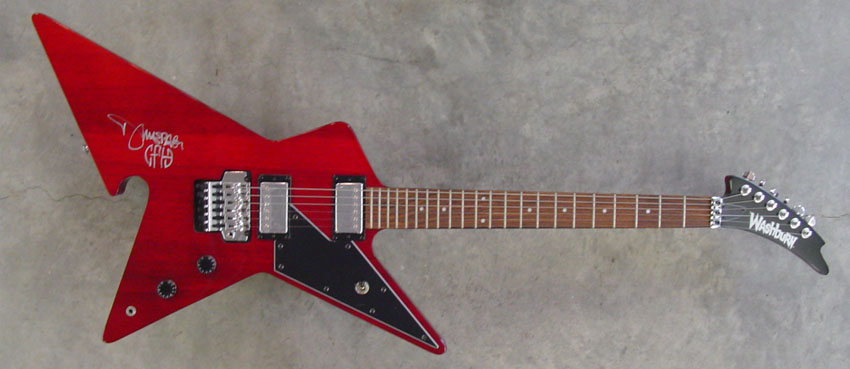
CP2003 "Culprit".

- "Dimebag Darrell" Abbott Washburn's Dean-ML-style Dime 333 and radical Explorer-like Dime Culprit models were the most popular. The Dime 333 had a Floyd Rose double-locking tremolo; the 332 variant featured a stop-tail bridge. The Culprit, with its sliced-up Explorer-style body, featured a Floyd Rose tremolo, a mirror pickguard and a pair of hot ceramic humbucking pickups with chrome covers.

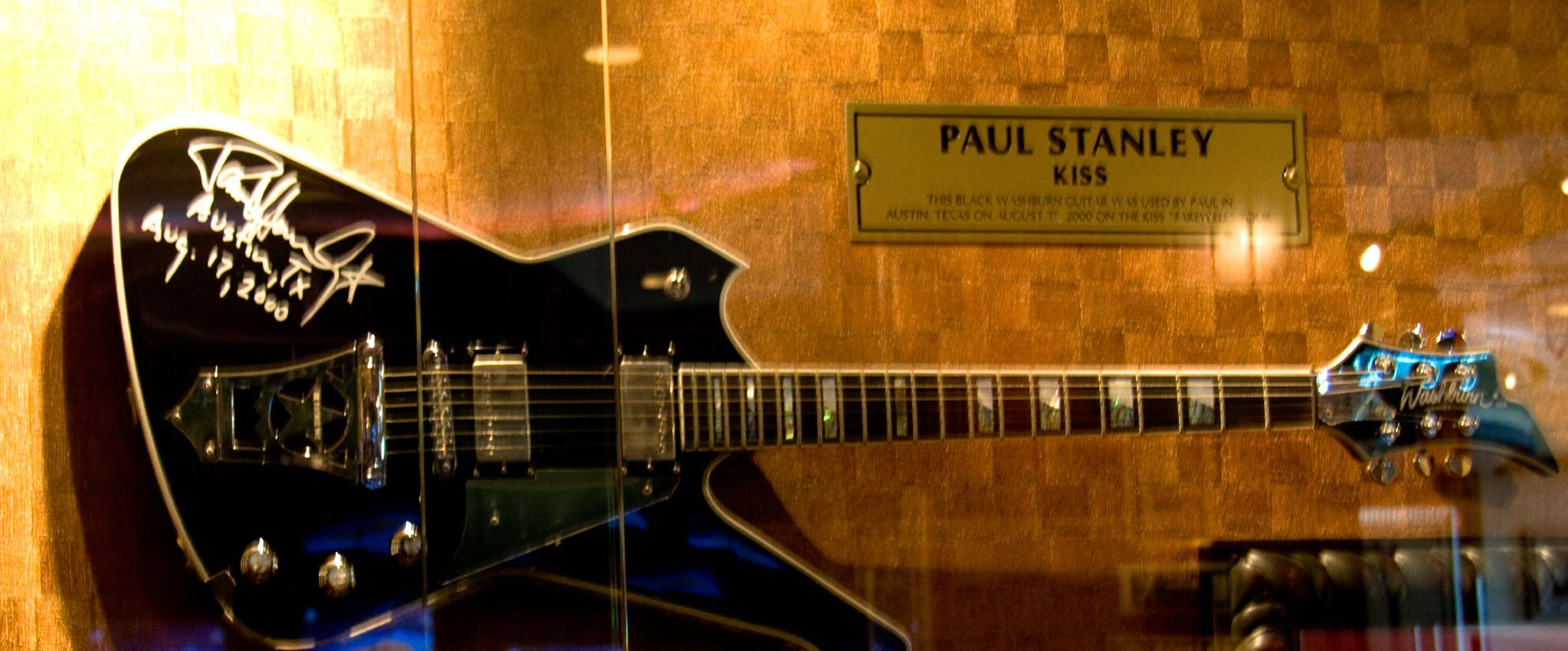
Paul Stanley model.

- Paul Stanley Models for 2014 were the PS2014, PS2012, PS 12 and PS10. Previous models have been the PS600 and PS800 (extensively used while touring with Kiss), as well as the "Preacher" PS7000/PS7200/PS9000/PS9200 (used during the 2006-2007 tour to promote his solo album Live to Win). Stanley's line also includes the PS9 and PS11E acoustic guitars that feature his image on the front and come bundled with a custom gig bag.
- Jennifer Batten — three guitars based on the WM (the USA version of the Maverick BT Series guitars). All had three single-coil pickups: JB-80 (Korea), JB-100 (USA), JB-100 MIDI (USA) with installed Roland GK-2A divided pickup system.
- Steve Stevens Signature Model (1993) — SS80 and SS100 models made at Washburn's Chicago custom shop, the SS40 mass-produced in Korea. The SS80 was produced in black with gold hardware, a Schaller-licensed Floyd Rose tremolo, and Seymour Duncan JB humbucking pickups. The SS100 featured black hardware and Frankenstein monster graphics.
- George Washburn / Stephens Extended Cutaway electric models — introduced in 1987, designed entirely by Stephen Davies. The series comprised the EC-26 Atlantis, the EC-29 Challenger, and the EC-36 Spitfire. The EC-29 and EC-36 were the first mass-produced guitars that had over 27 frets. The 26-fret EC-26 was made in the United States and is a very rare model.
- Nick Catanese Signature Model (1999) — Idol Series (WI) models for Nick Catanese.
- Stu Hamm - signature electric basses designed with Stu Hamm.
- Dan Donegan Signature Model/Maya Series (2003) — six-string electric guitar series for Disturbed guitarist Dan Donegan and named after his daughter Maya: the Maya Standard (DD-70) and the Maya Pro (DD-75). Both use Seymour Duncan pickups.
- Bootsy Collins Space Bass (2006): model for Bootsy Collins. Features Fender Jazz Bass pickups.
- James Malone Signature Heavy Metal V (2009): model for James Malone, lead vocalist and guitarist of Arsis. Based on the original Heavy Metal series with a signature graphic bats image.
