= U.S. Music Corporation =

American musical instrument company

U.S. Music Corp.
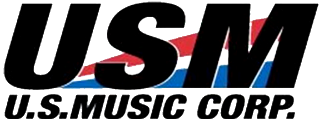
- Type: Subsidiary
- Industry: Music industry
- Headquarters: Buffalo Grove, Illinois, United States
- Parent: Exertis JAM
- Website: usmusiccorp.com

U.S. Music Corp. is an American musical instrument company based in Buffalo Grove, Illinois, United States, a suburb of Chicago, that manufactures and distributes products worldwide. The company is currently a subsidiary of Canadian corporate group Exertis | JAM.

== History ==
On December 15, 2002, Washburn International announced it had acquired distributor U.S. Music Corporation and would be rolling its assets into USM in a reverse merger.

In mid-2009, U.S. Music was purchased by Jam Industries of Montreal, Quebec, Canada.

== See also ==
- Music of the United States
