= Ibanez =

Japanese guitar brand

Ibanez Guitars
- Native name: アイバニーズ
- Type: Private
- Industry: Musical instruments manufacturing
- Founded: 1957; 69 years ago in Nagoya, Japan
- Headquarters: Nagoya, Aichi, Japan
- Area served: Worldwide
- Products: Electric, acoustic, resonator & classical guitars Electric & acoustic basses Amplifiers; Ukuleles; Banjos; Mandolins; Effects units
- Parent: Hoshino Gakki
- Website: www.ibanez.com

Ibanez (アイバニーズ, Aibanīzu) is a Japanese guitar brand owned by Hoshino Gakki. Based in Nagoya, Aichi, Japan, Hoshino Gakki was one of the first Japanese musical instrument companies to sell guitars in the United States and Europe, and the first manufacturer to mass-produce seven-string and eight-string guitars. Ibanez manufactures effects, accessories, amps, and instruments in Japan, China, Indonesia, and the United States (at a Los Angeles-based custom shop). As of 2017, the company sold nearly 165 models of bass guitar, 130 acoustic guitars, and more than 300 electric guitars. In 2024, Ibanez sold more guitars than any manufacturer except Gibson, Fender, and PRS.

Daryl Robertson of Guitar World conferred the title of "the shredder's weapon of choice" on the Ibanez.

== History ==
Ibanez in 1960s–1970s

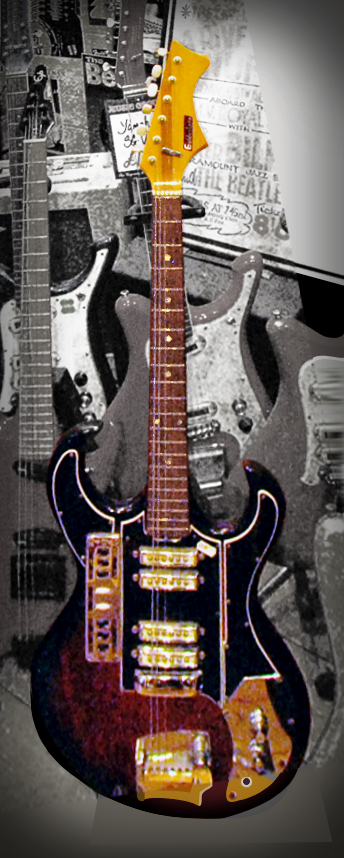
Montclair (1960s)

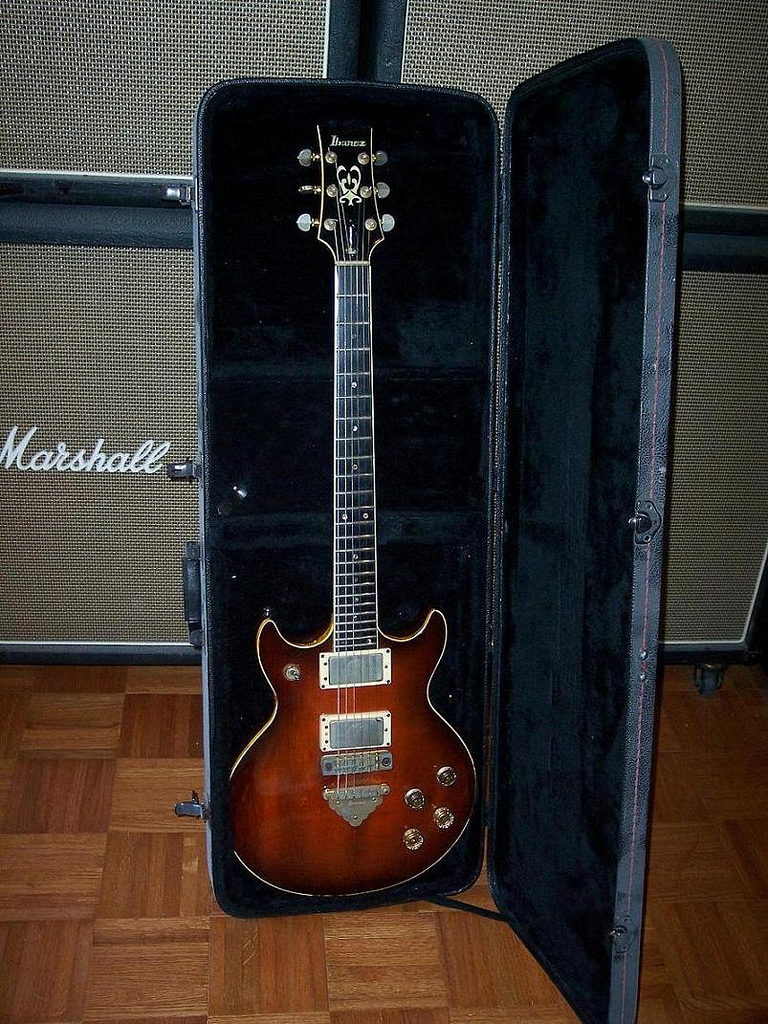
Ibanez Artist
(mid 1970s)

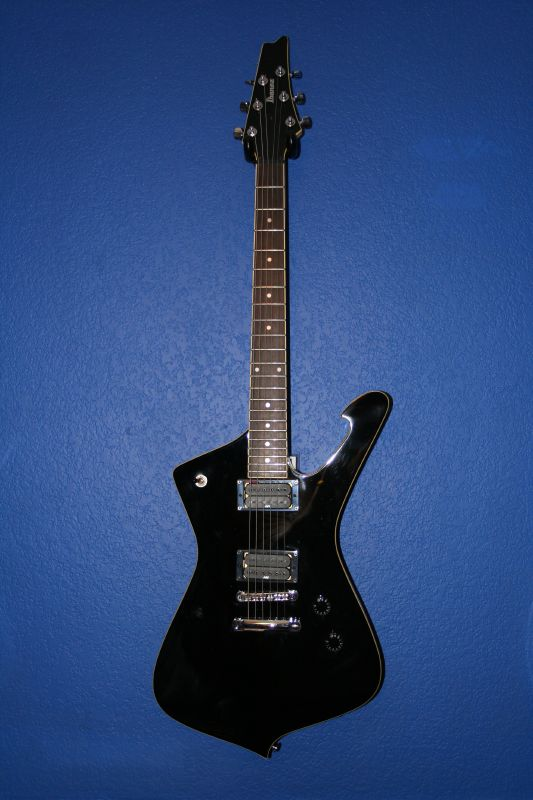
Ibanez Iceman

The Hoshino Gakki company began in 1908 as the musical instrument sales division of the Hoshino Shoten, a bookstore chain. Hoshino Gakki decided in 1935 to make Spanish-style acoustic guitars, at first using the "Ibanez Salvador" brand name in reference to Spanish luthier Salvador Ibáñez, and later simply "Ibanez". Accordingly, the brand originally was pronounced i-banyesu/i-baniizu (イバニェス/イバニーズ) in Japan, reflecting the Spanish pronunciation, before changing its pronunciation in 1986 to the current name, which represents an English pronunciation of Ibanez.

The modern era of Ibanez guitars began in 1957. The late 1950s and 1960s Ibanez catalogues show guitars with some wild-looking designs, manufactured by Kiso Suzuki Violin, (Note: Star Musical Merchandise Catalog No.591, Nagoya, Japan: Hoshino Gakki Ten, Inc., 1950s, archived from the original on 2011-08-20. Note: the wide variety of musical instruments in this catalog reflect their full-time export business during that era. The arched-top guitars and violin-family instruments suggest the involvement of Suzuki Violin in Nagoya and its brother factory, Kiso Suzuki Violin in Kiso. Their third brother in Matsumoto, Shin'ichi Suzuki was a founder of the Suzuki method, and their cultural activities influenced the establishment of FujiGen in Matsumoto, according to a co-founder of FujiGen, Yuichiro Yokouchi.) Guyatone, (Note: 1960 Star Catalog, p. 4, archived from the original on 2011-08-20 (Models: EG 80, EG 80-B, EG 80-H, EG 90)) (Note: 1961 Ibanez Electric Guitars, p. 1, 2, archived from the original on 2011-08-20 (Models: No. 1830 (2pu), No. 1850 (3pu), No. 1860 (2pu with tremolo), No. 1880 (3pu with tremolo), No. 1950 (bass))) and their own Tama factory established in 1962. After the Tama factory stopped manufacturing guitars in 1966, Hoshino Gakki contracted the Teisco String Instruments Company to make Ibanez guitars. After the Teisco String Instrument factory closed in 1970, Hoshino Gakki contracted with FujiGen Gakki to make Ibanez guitars.

Ibanez in 1980s–2000s

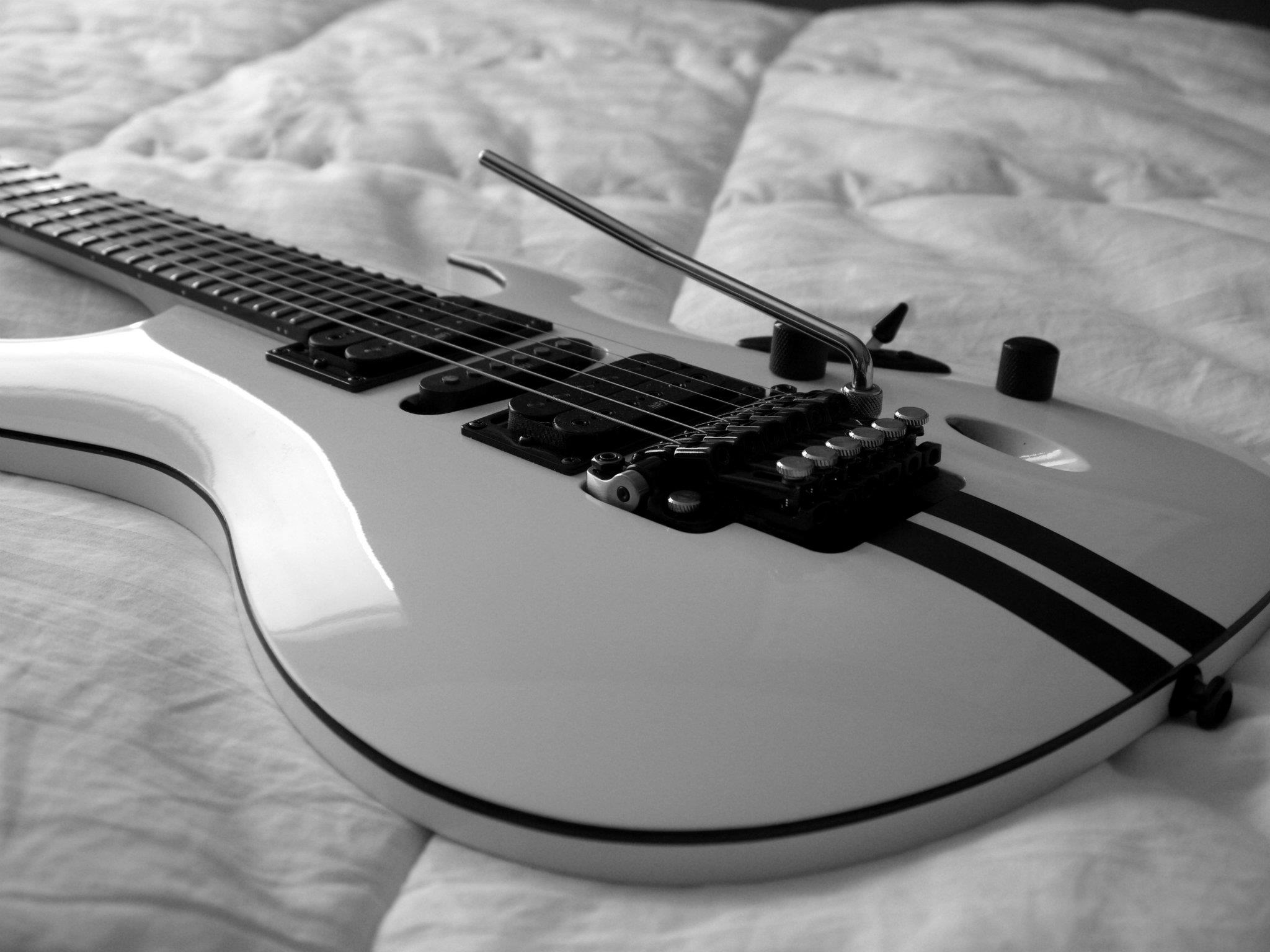
Ibanez S

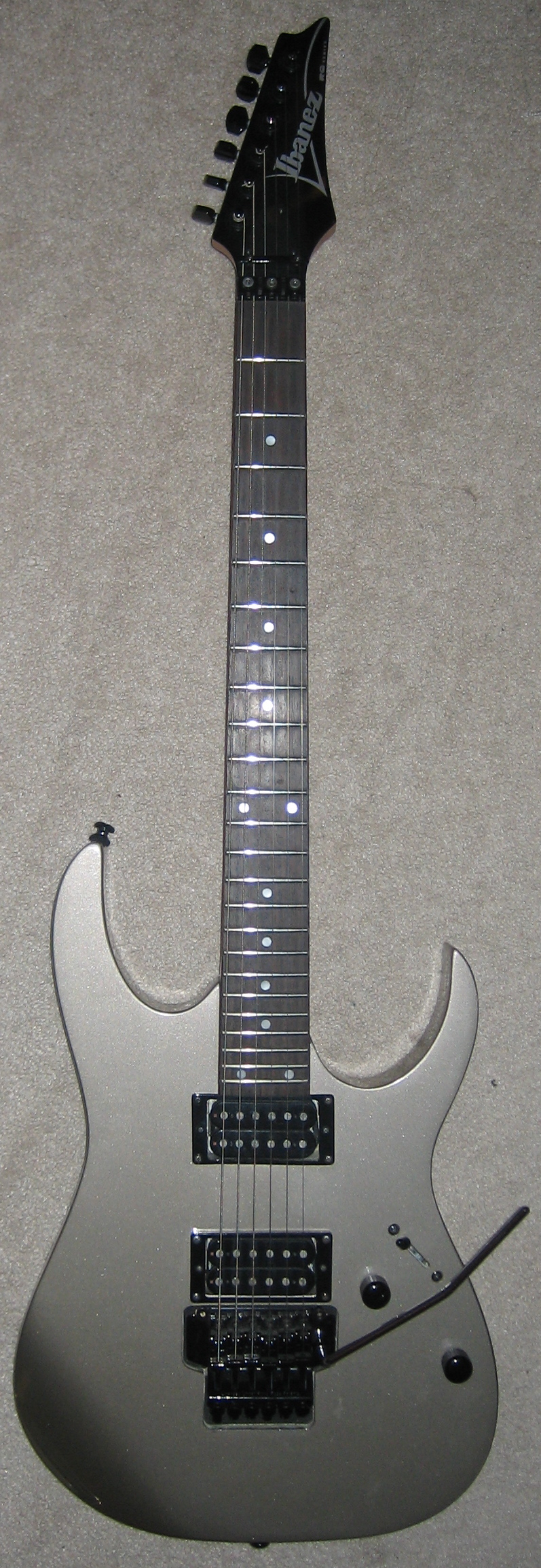
Ibanez RG

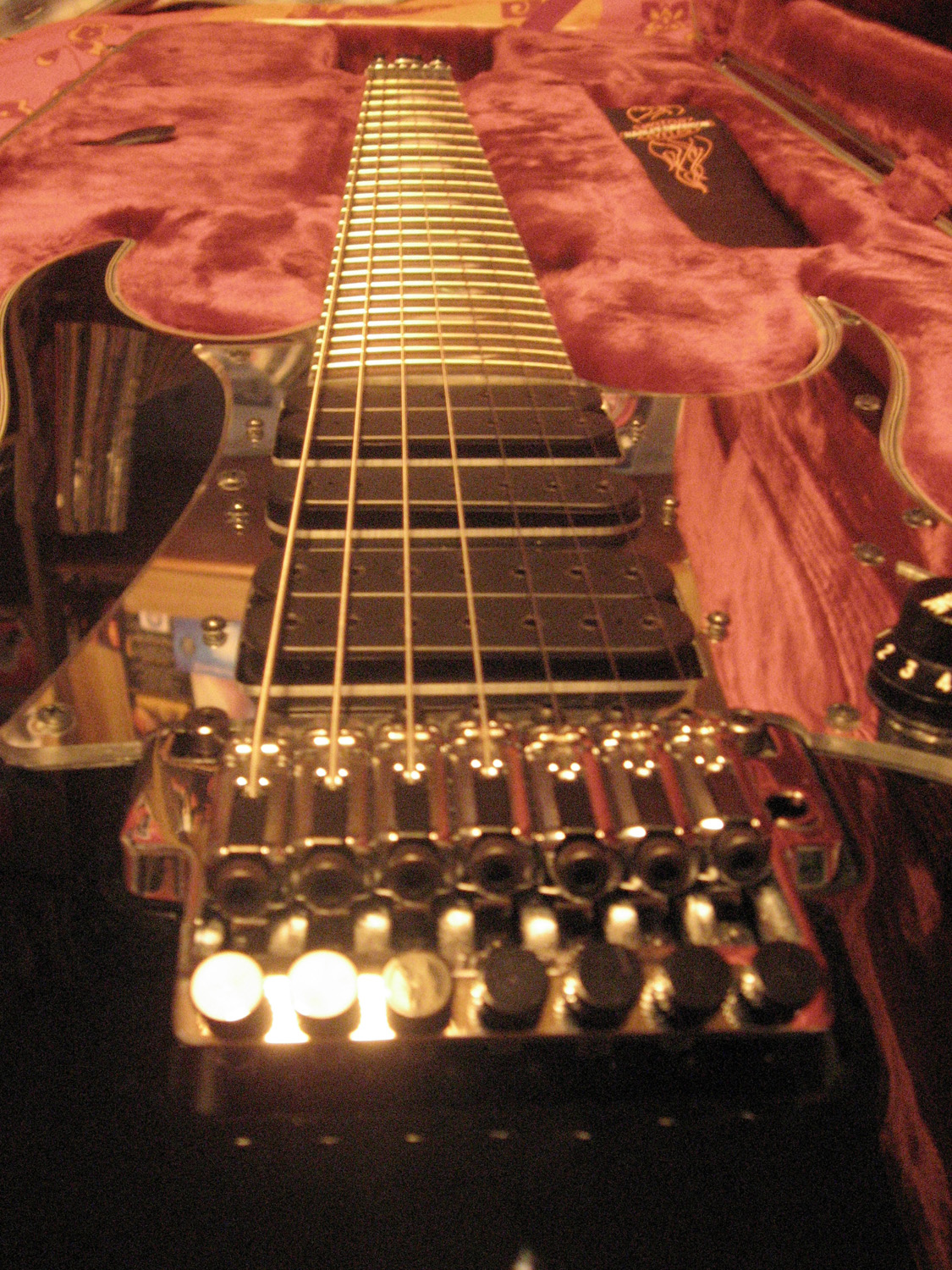
Ibanez UV777

In the 1960s, Japanese guitar makers mainly copied American guitar designs, and Ibanez-branded copies of Gibson, Fender, and Rickenbacker models appeared. This resulted in the so-called lawsuit period.

As a result of the lawsuit, Hoshino Gakki introduced Ibanez models based on unique designs, such as the Iceman and the Roadstar series. The company has produced its own guitar designs ever since. The late 1980s and early 1990s were an important period for the Ibanez brand. Hoshino Gakki's relationship with guitarist Steve Vai resulted in the introduction of the Ibanez JEM and the Ibanez Universe models; after the earlier successes of the Roadstar and Iceman models in the late 1970s – early 1980s, Hoshino Gakki entered the superstrat market with the RG series, a lower-priced version of their JEM series.

Ibanez Acoustic

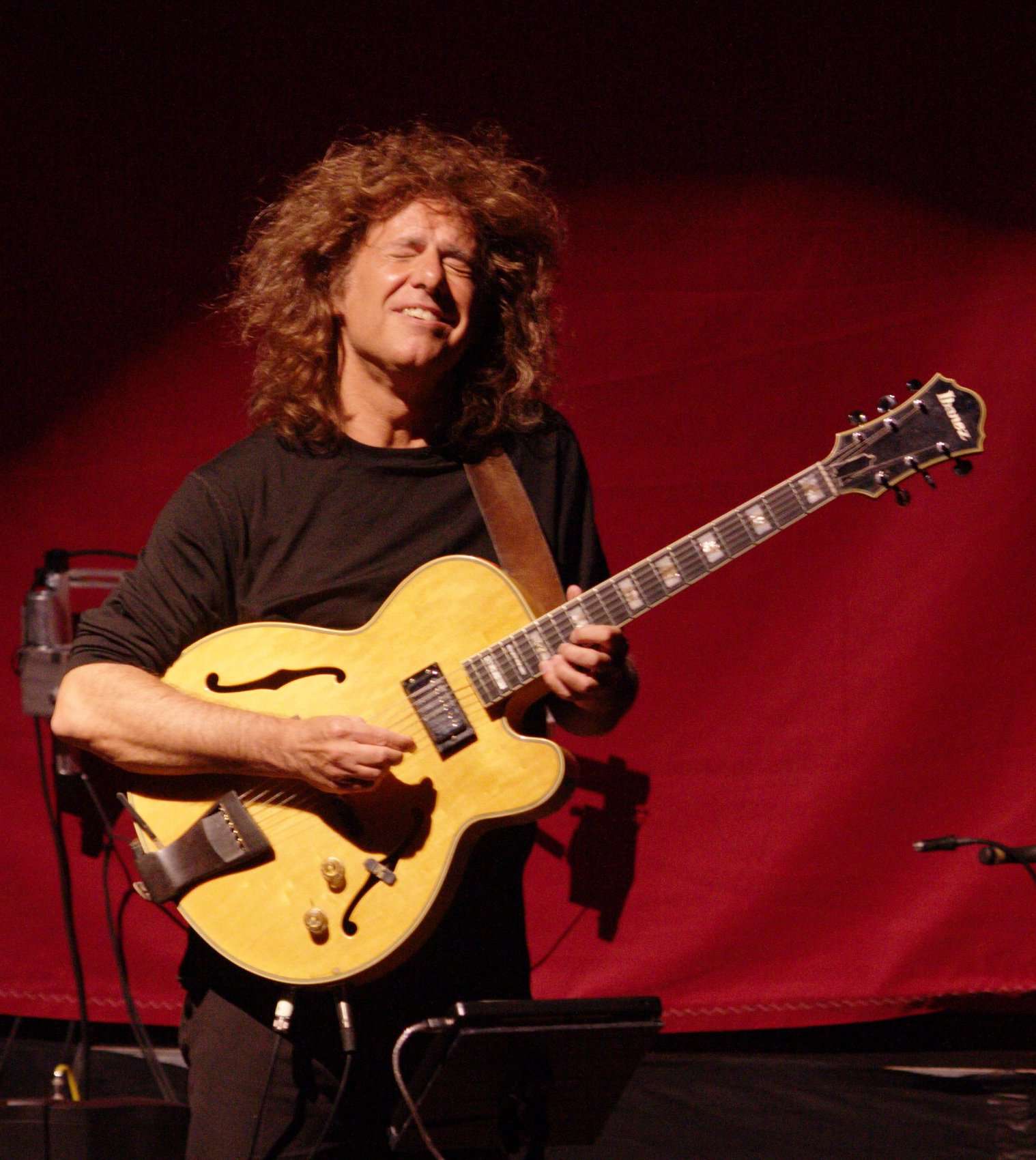
Pat Metheny with his signature model, the Ibanez PM

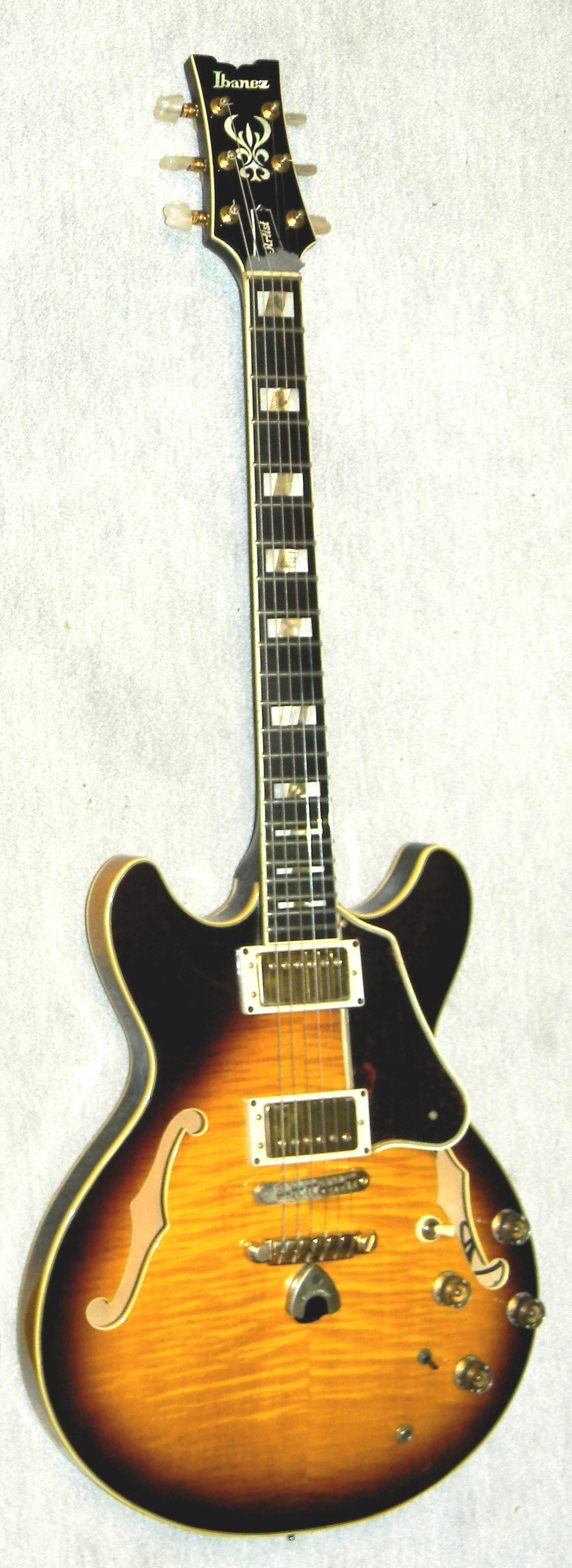
Ibanez AS200

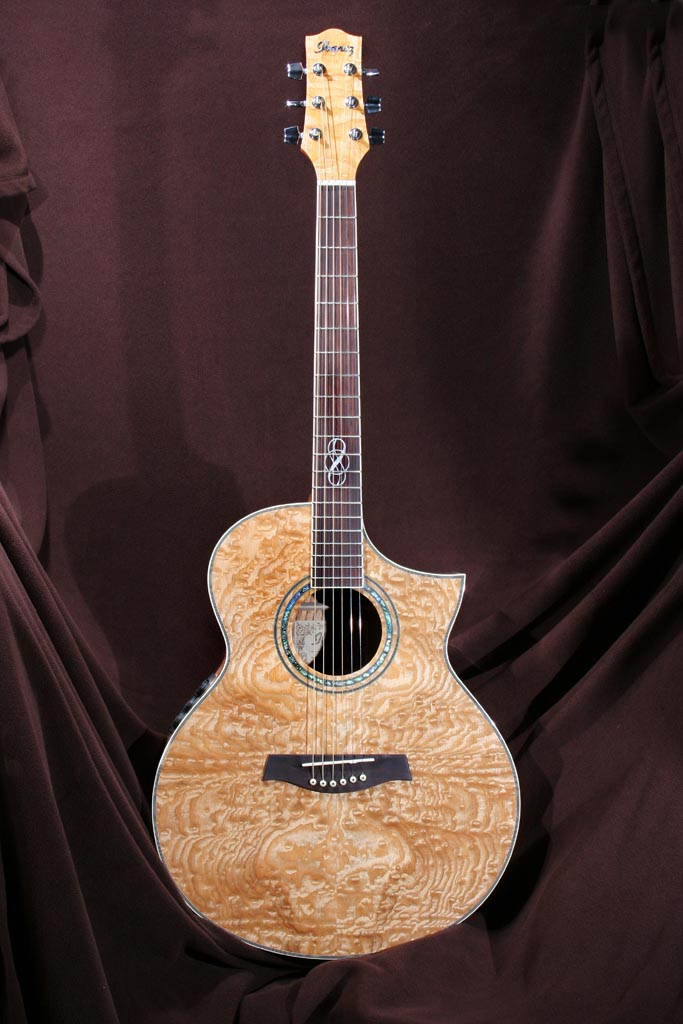
Ibanez EW20ASE (Exotic Wood)

Hoshino Gakki also had semi-acoustic, nylon- and steel-stringed acoustic guitars manufactured under the Ibanez name. Most Ibanez guitars were made by the FujiGen guitar factory in Japan up until the mid- to late 1980s, and from then on Ibanez guitars have also been made in other Asian countries such as Korea, China, and Indonesia. During the early 1980s, the FujiGen guitar factory also produced most of the Roland guitar synthesizers, including the Stratocaster-style Roland G-505, the twin-humbucker Roland G-202 (endorsed by Adrian Belew, Eric Clapton, Dean Brown, Jeff Baxter, Yannis Spathas, Christoforos Krokidis, Steve Howe, Mike Rutherford, Andy Summers, Neal Schon and Steve Hackett) and the Ibanez X-ING IMG-2010.

Cimar and Starfield were guitar and bass brands owned by Hoshino Gakki. In the 1970s, Hoshino Gakki and Kanda Shokai shared some guitar designs, and so some Ibanez and Greco guitars have the same features. The Greco versions were sold in Japan and the Ibanez versions were sold outside Japan. From 1982, Ibanez guitars have also been sold in Japan as well.

Guitar brands such as Antoria and Mann shared some Ibanez guitar designs. The Antoria guitar brand was managed by JT Coppock Leeds Ltd England. CSL was a brand name managed by Charles Summerfield Ltd England. Maurice Summerfield of the Charles Summerfield Ltd company contributed some design ideas to Hoshino Gakki and also imported Ibanez and CSL guitars into the United Kingdom from 1964 to 1987. The Maxxas brand name came about because Hoshino Gakki thought that the guitar did not fit in with the Ibanez model range and was therefore named Maxxas by Rich Lasner from Hoshino USA.

=== The "lawsuit" guitars ===
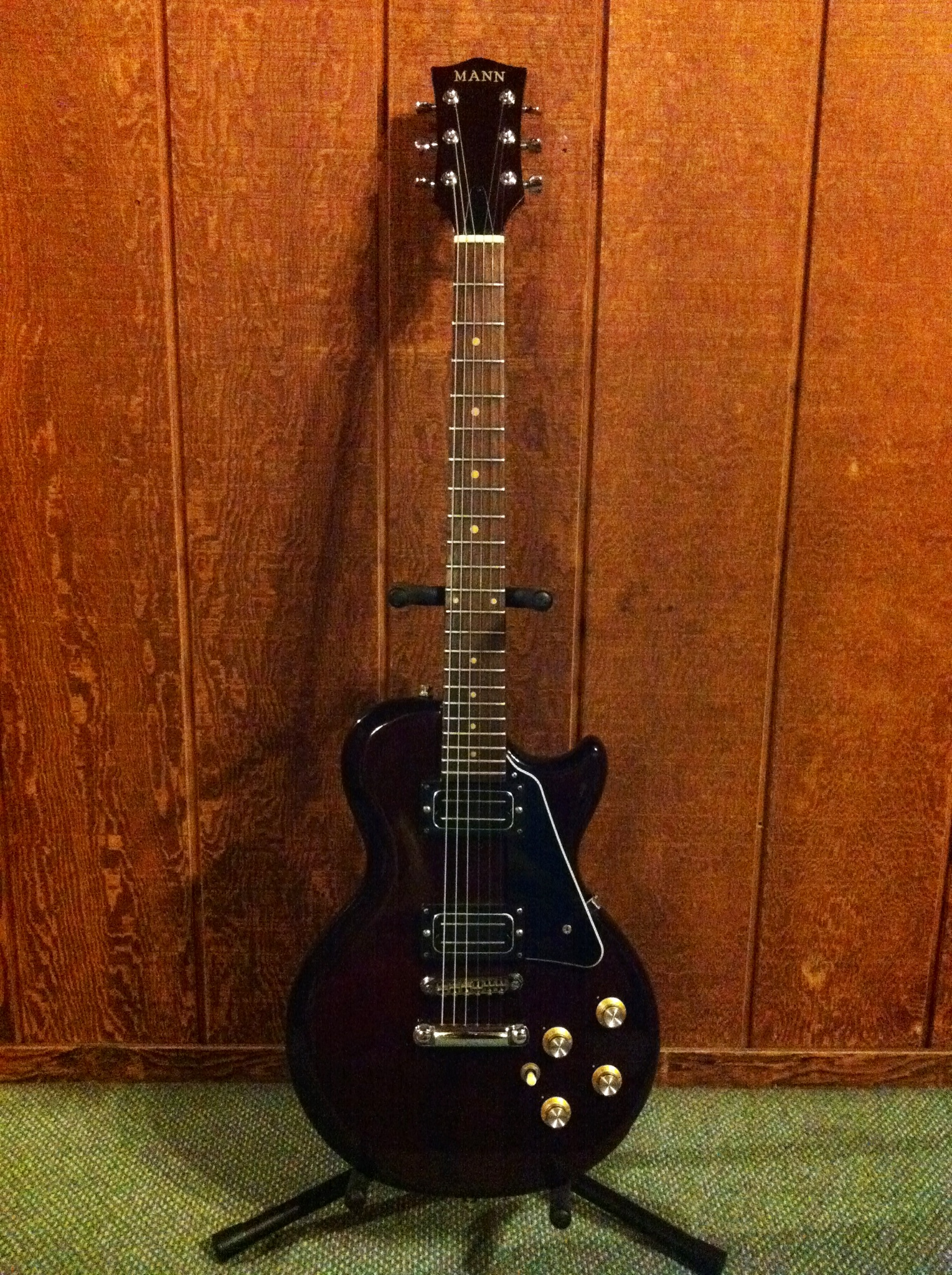
Mid-1970s "Lawsuit Era" solid body, set neck, Mann/Ibanez electric guitar

Harry Rosenbloom, founder of the (now-closed) Medley Music of Bryn Mawr, Pennsylvania, was manufacturing handmade guitars under the name "Elger". By 1965, Rosenbloom had decided to stop manufacturing guitars and chose to become the exclusive North American distributor for Ibanez guitars. In September 1972, Hoshino began a partnership with Elger Guitars to import guitars from Japan. In September 1981, Elger was renamed "Hoshino U.S.A.", retaining the company headquarters in Bensalem Township, Pennsylvania, as a distribution and quality-control center.

On June 28, 1977, in the Philadelphia Federal District Court, a lawsuit was filed by the Norlin Corporation, the parent company of Gibson Guitars, against Elger/Hoshino U.S.A.'s use of the Gibson headstock design and logo. Hoshino settled out of court in early 1978 and the case was officially closed on February 2, 1978.

After the lawsuit, Hoshino Gakki abandoned the strategy of copying "classic" electric guitar designs, having already introduced a plethora of original designs. Hoshino was producing their original Artist models from 1974, introducing a set-neck model in 1975. In 1977, they upgraded and extended their Artist range and introduced a number of other top-quality original designs made to match or surpass famous American brands: the Performer and short-lived Concert ranges, which competed with the Les Paul; through-neck Musicians; Studios in fixed- and through-neck construction; the radically shaped Iceman; and the Roadster which morphed into the Roadstar range, precursor to the popular superstrat era in the mid-1980s. The newer Ibanez models began incorporating more modern elements into their design such as radical body shapes, slimmer necks, 2-octave fingerboards, slim pointed headstocks, higher-output electronics, humbucker/single-coil/humbucker (H/S/H) pickup configurations, locking tremolo bridges and different finishes.

== Guitars ==
=== Sub-brands ===
==== Ibanez J. Custom ====
The J. Custom series are the most exclusive and expensive guitars Ibanez offers. They are "envisioned to be the finest Japanese-made guitar in history". Built by some of the most skilled luthiers in Japan, they "represent every advance in design and technology Ibanez has developed over the last 20 years". As of 2022, they feature Dimarzio pickups, 5 piece maple/wenge necks with Titanium reinforcement rods, ebony fingerboard with a tree of life fret board inlay, and Edge Zero tremolo systems. Even among J. Customs there are two tiers: most of the standard production J. Customs (the ones that appear in catalogs) are produced by FujiGen Gakki while the more limited production models are produced by Sugi Guitars. The Sugi-made models are typically produced in very limited numbers from one-offs to maybe a dozen copies of a single design.

==== Ibanez Prestige ====
The Prestige guitars are Ibanez's top-of-the-line models that are built in Japan. They feature higher quality materials, high craftsmanship, and higher quality bridges compared to other models.

==== Ibanez Premium ====
The Premium guitars are similar to other models but are built in Ibanez's Indonesian premium factory to premium quality standards.

==== Ibanez Gio ====
The Ibanez Gio are Ibanez' budget guitars made in China, designed for high playability at low costs. Many high end Ibanez guitars are recreated in the more affordable Gio form, such as the RGA and ART models.

==== U.S.A. custom ====
USA custom range. Late 1980s to mid-1990s. Also known as Ibanez LACS (Los Angeles Custom Shop), services only their endorsed artists today.

=== Solid body electric guitars ===
==== Ibanez RG ====
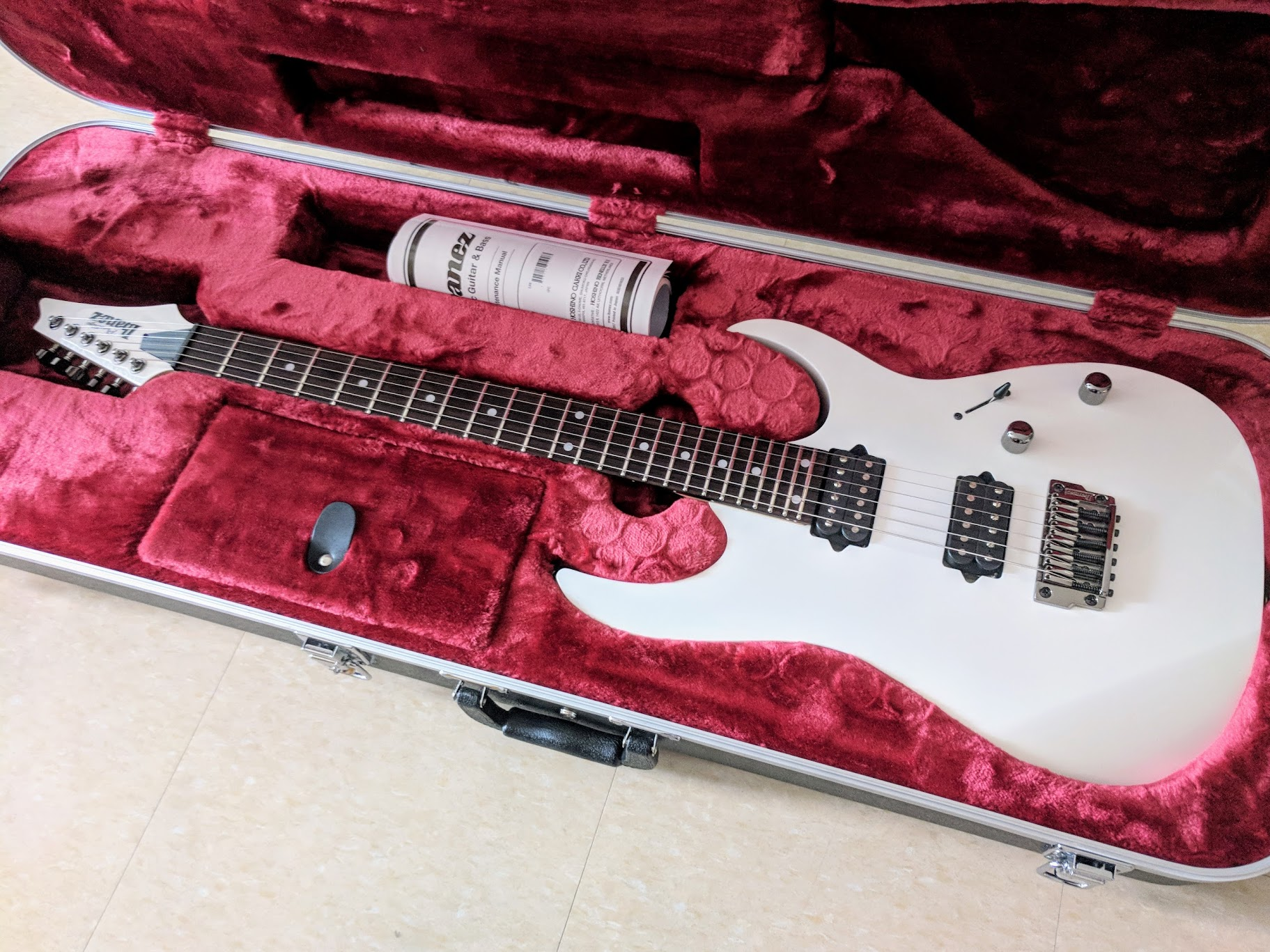
2017 Ibanez RG652FX WH

The main characteristics that are common among all Ibanez RG guitars (RG stands for Roadstar Guitar) are that they feature 24 frets and use thin necks, known as "Wizard", which allows for faster playing. The RG features a line up of guitars with both floating tremolo systems and fixed bridge systems.

==== Ibanez RGA ====
The Ibanez RGA was introduced at a time when the Ibanez RG series only had tremolo bridges. Since then, the RG series has introduced fixed bridge models, but Ibanez still produces the RGA series with an arched top to differentiate from the RG series. The arched top allows for added comfort while playing the guitar.

==== Ibanez RGD ====
The Ibanez RGD guitar was developed for heavy metal guitar players. The RGD features a 26.5" scale which allows for lower than standard guitar tuning while retaining standard string tension without use of thicker gauge strings. It also features an extra deep scoop cut on the lower horn for easy high fret access. Ibanez currently makes two Ibanez RGD Prestige models.

==== Ibanez S ====
The Ibanez S (Saber) guitar has an extremely thin body made out of mahogany, and is available in 6, 7 and 8-string models. They may come with either 22 or 24 frets, depending on year of manufacture. The standard line currently have Wizard III necks that are slightly wider and thicker than the original Wizard. All S models have bodies that are thicker in the middle where the pickups are, and taper off towards the outer edges. The guitars use ZR (Zero Resistance), Lo-TRS, and variants of the Edge bridge system as well as fixed bridges. Ibanez currently makes 8 Prestige S-Series guitars.

==== Ibanez Q ====
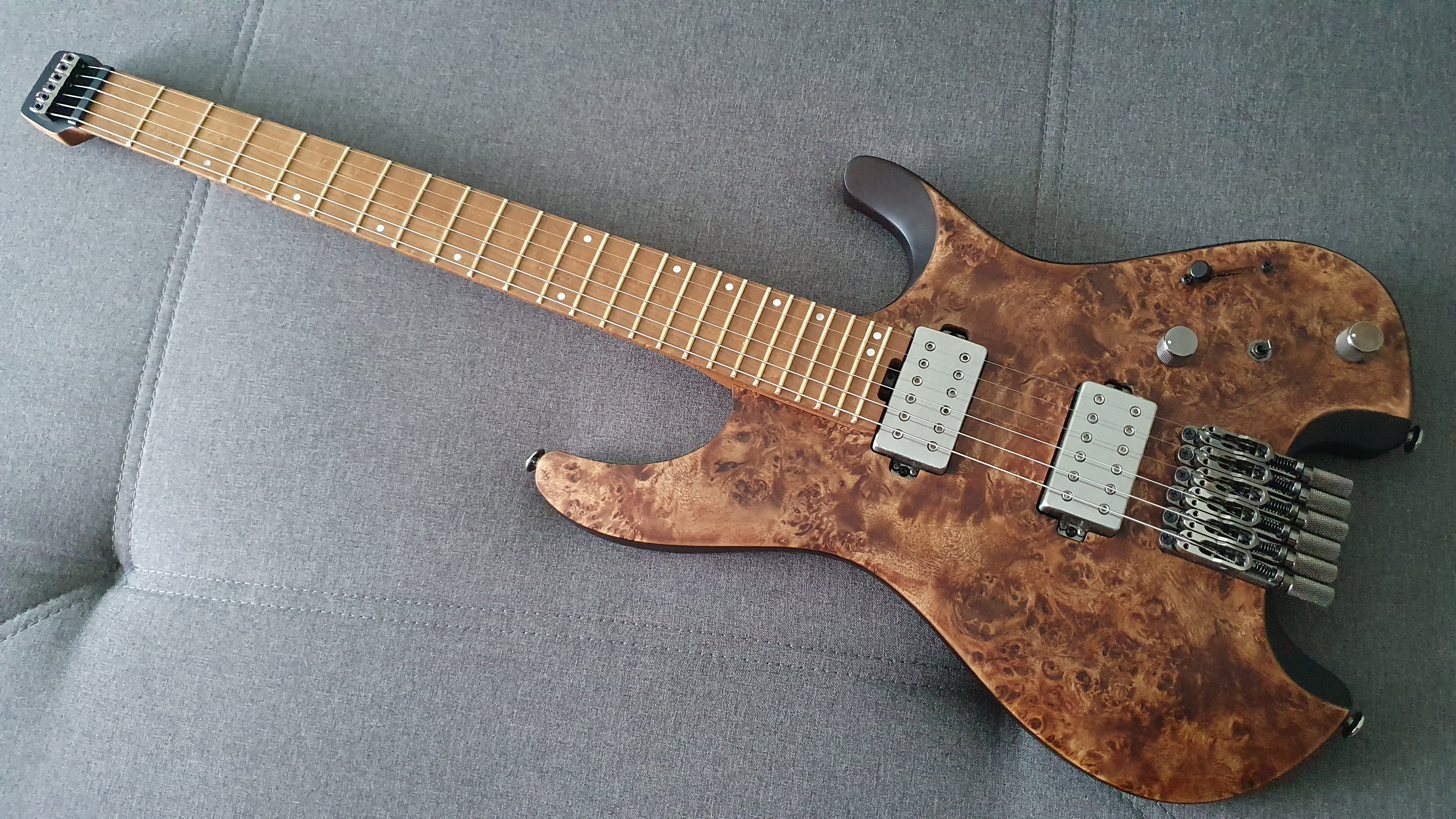
Ibanez Q52PB ABS

The Ibanez Q was released in June 2021 as its new headless guitar series, with 6- and 7-string models and a 25.5" scale length. They feature a small nyatoh body and a new bridge developed by Ibanez, the Mono-Tune. Along with a 5-way blade switch, there is a 2-way Alter Switch, which gives another 5 different pickup combinations. The QX variation has slanted frets – ordinary frets inclined at a 8 degree angle. They're made exclusively in Indonesia.

==== Ibanez DN ====
The Ibanez DN guitar (DN stands for Darkstone) was developed for heavy metal guitar players. The main features of the DN are that it has a set-in neck for speed and playing comfort, medium frets, and coil tapped pickups. This guitar is currently discontinued.

==== Ibanez X ====
The Ibanez X guitars are Ibanez guitars that feature unconventional and unique body designs. An example would be the Ibanez Xiphos, which is stylized to look like the letter X.

==== Ibanez Artist (AR) ====
The Ibanez Artist guitars were designed for heavy playing such as for heavy metal or traditional rock. The Artist ARZ is a single cutaway, 24 fret, 25" scale guitar that features a wide variety of bridges and pickups depending on the specific models. The Artist ART is a single cutaway, 22 fret, 24.75" scale guitar that features a hard tail bridge. The Ibanez AR is a reissued series originating from the 70s. The AR series features a set-in neck, double cutaway, with 22 frets on a 24.75" scale.

==== Ibanez FR ====
The Ibanez FR is a simple body type guitar that is designed to be played in many genres.

==== Ibanez Mikro ====
The Ibanez Mikro series are small form factor guitars designed for children, beginners, or guitar players looking for a guitar that is easy to transport.

=== Hollow body electric guitars ===
==== Ibanez Artcore series ====
The first Ibanez Artcore models were released in mid-2002 whose goal was to offer an affordable range of full-hollow and semi-hollow body guitars that appealed to entry level guitarists who were unable or unwilling to pay big money on high-priced guitars.

==== Ibanez Artcore Custom ====
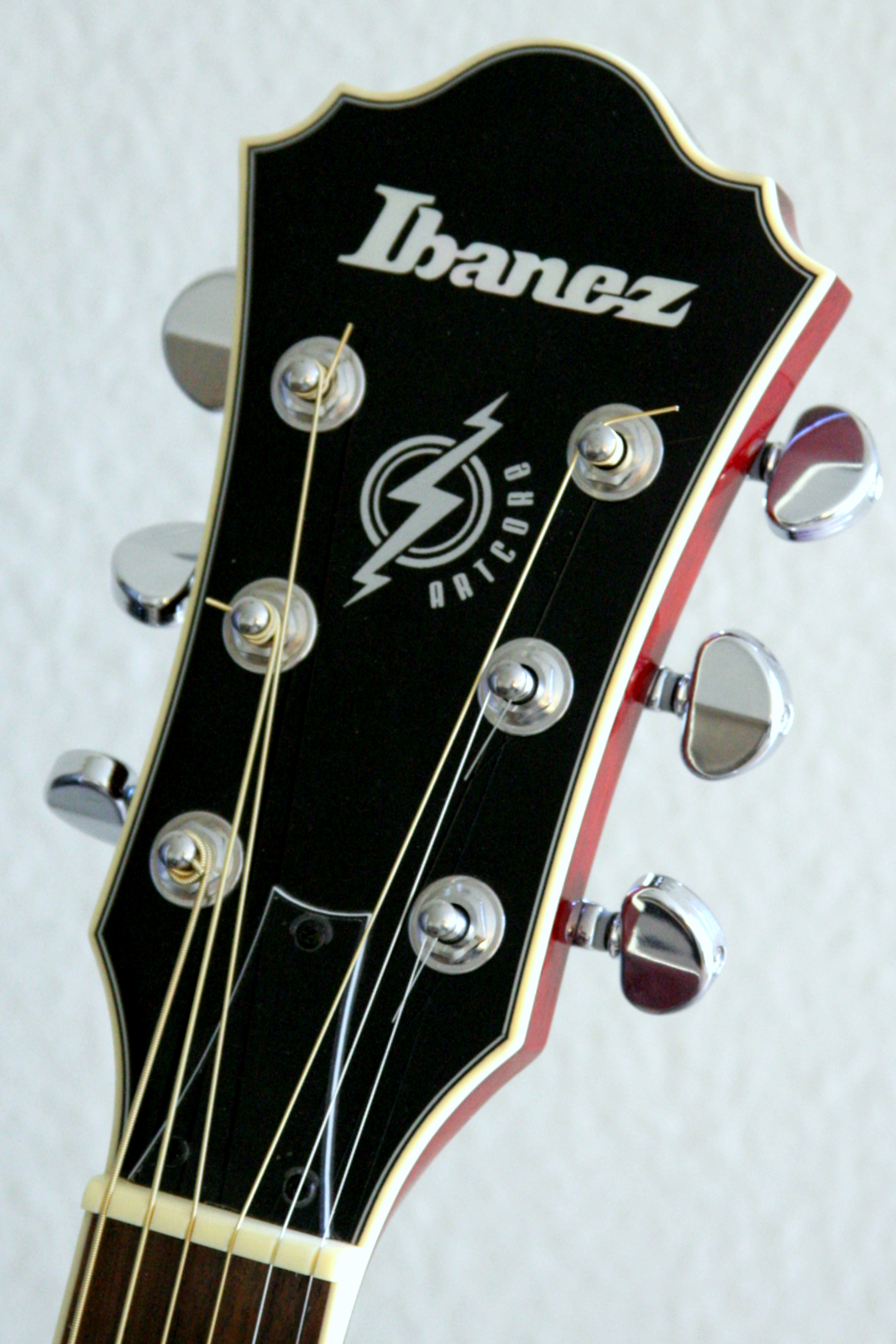
Headstock from an ARTCORE series guitar

The Artcore Custom is Ibanez's flagship model for the Artcore series. The bodies of the guitars are made of maple, the neck has a set-in construction type, and features wood control knobs and hand rolled frets.

==== Ibanez AK ====
The Ibanez AK is a guitar designed for jazz and blues type playing. It features a slim set-in neck with a body designed to easily access the higher frets. The AK is easily distinguishable by its sharper lower body horn (Florentine cutaway) that other Artcore guitars do not have.

=== Production signature guitars ===
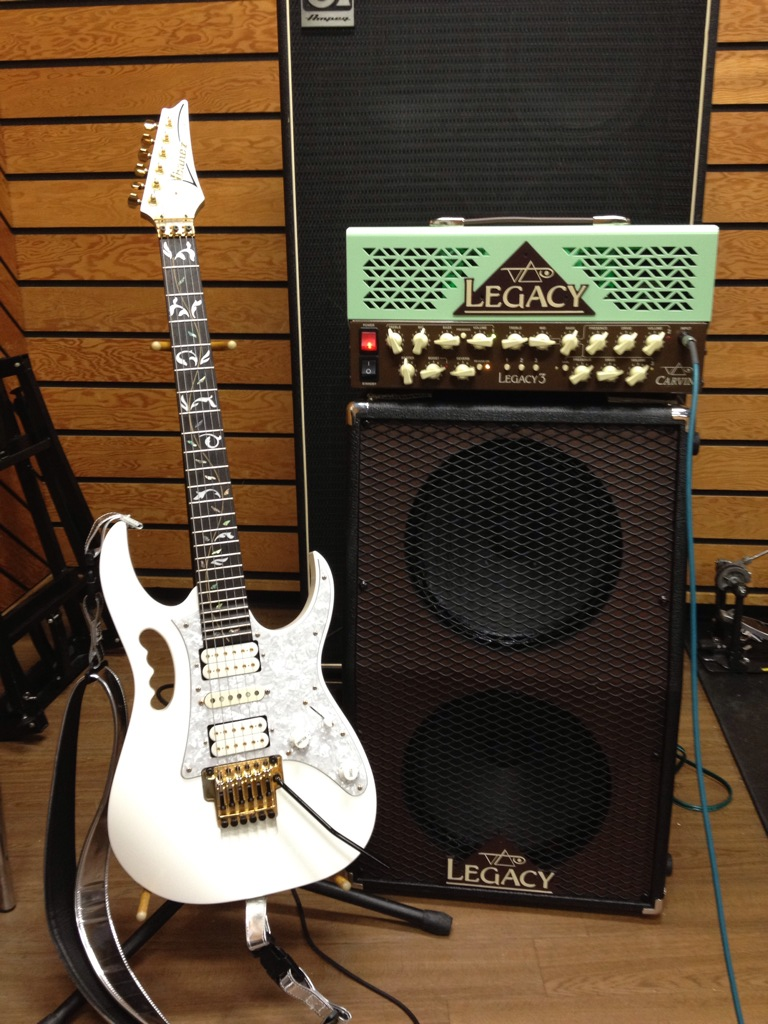
JEM7VWH

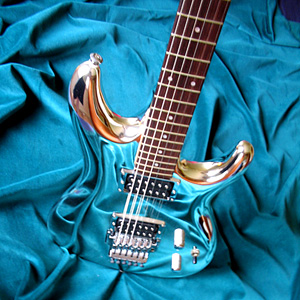
JS10th Chrome Boy

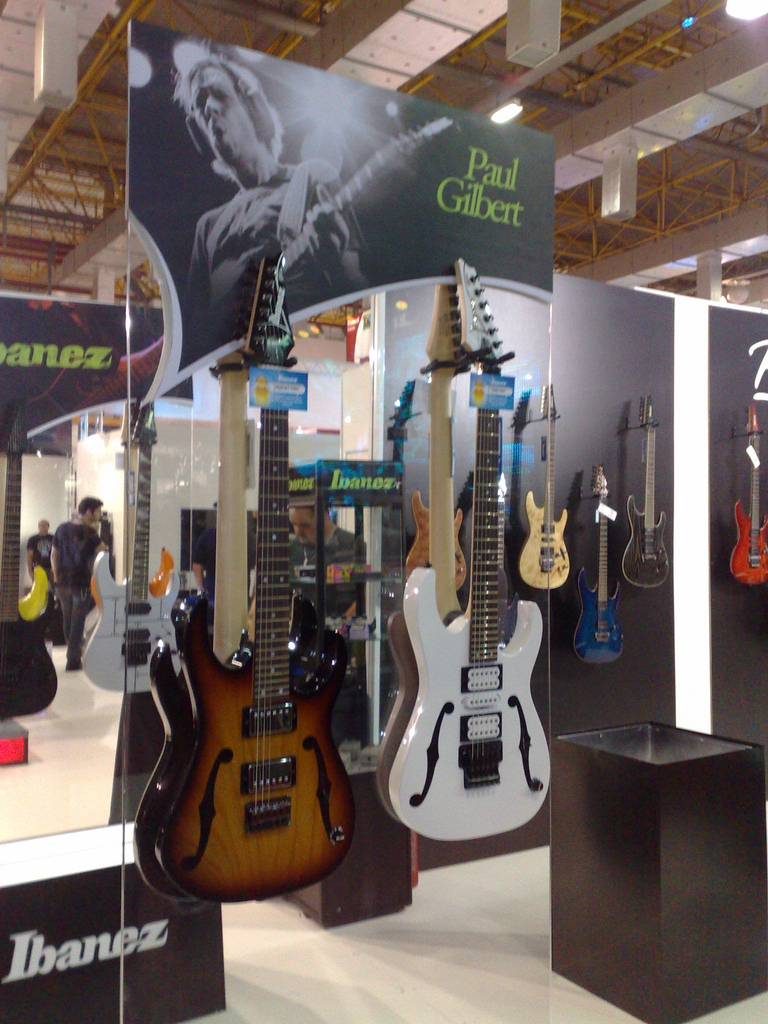
PGM models

- JEM, Universe and Pia Series – Steve Vai Signature
- JS – Joe Satriani Signature
- PGM – Paul Gilbert Signature
- APEX – Munky Signature
- E-Gen – Herman Li Signature
- NDM4 – Noodles Signature
- PWM – Paul Waggoner Signature
- KIKO – Kiko Loureiro Signature
- STM2 – Sam Totman Signature
- ORM – Omar Rodriguez Signature
- MBM – Matt Bachand Signature
- HRG – H. R. Giger Signature
- GB – George Benson Signature
- K7 – Head and Munky Signature
- PM – Pat Metheny Signature
- PS10 – Paul Stanley Signature
- JSM – John Scofield Signature
- AT – Andy Timmons Signature
- TAM – Tosin Abasi Signature
- RBM – Reb Beach Signature
- JBM – Jake Bowen Signature
- BBM – Ben Bruce Signature
- JIVA – Nita Strauss Signature
- TOD and THBB – Tim Henson Signature
- SLM – Scott LePage Signature
- MAR – Mario Camarena Signature
- EH – Erick Hansel Signature
- YY – Yvette Young Signature
- M8M – Mårten Hagström Signature
- FTM – Fredrik Thordendal Signature
- ICHI – Ichika Nito Signature
- LB – Lari Basilio Signature
- MRC – Marcin Signature

=== Discontinued guitars ===
Discontinued guitars
- Ibanez R series, also known as the Radius series, are famous for having lightweight aerofoil-profiled basswood bodies. The main endorser was Joe Satriani before he was given his own Signature JS series. The Radius series is now discontinued.
- RT series – Superstrat design with 24 frets. Discontinued in 1994.
- RX series – Superstrat design but with 22 frets instead. Discontinued in 1998, and currently only exists as GRX (budget model of RX series).
- Axstar (a.k.a. Axstar by Ibanez) – discontinued
- EDR/EXR – Ergodyne series – discontinued
- MC – Musician series – Discontinued – Neck-through construction (except for MC-100, which has a bolt-on neck), with 24 frets (two octaves) – As with the Artist models of the late 1970s, some of these guitars were equipped with trisound switches, and some models (MC 400 and MC 500) were equipped with active electronics.
- ST – Studio series 1977–82 offset double cutaway ranging from bolt on to fixed and through necks with pairs of V2 distortion humbuckers. 24 frets and 25.5" scale.
- CN – Concert range 1977–79 like a bolt on neck Artist with slightly offset cutaways.
- SB70 – Studio & Blazer spot build: Mixing Studio series double cutaway, ash bodies with Blazer series 21 fret bolt on maple necks, and sporting a fixed brass bridge, 2 Super 70 Humbuckers, 1 vol, 2 tone knobs, a pickup selector switch, and a phase mini-toggle switch (which gives a unique strat-like quack sound), an estimated 300-400 of these were assembled, mostly in 1982. A cult following has emerged, as these guitars are rare, and sell for 3x-4x their original price. Learn more at The Unofficial SB70 Registry: https://www.ibanezcollectors.com/forum/index.php?topic=20623.0
- BL – Blazer series 1980–82 – fixed bridge strat-like with maple necks and mahogany or ash bodies sporting 3 single coil pickups (Super 6 or BL) or 2 Super 70 humbuckers.
- ARC-100/300 (Retro Series)
- ARX-100/300 (Retro Series)
- AR-100/200 (black vintage top)
- V Series – Flying V's – discontinued
- Ibanez Artcore Series – Ibanez's full and semi-hollow guitar line, with some models discontinued since their debut in 2002.
- Ibanez Jet King 2 and Jet King 1 – A modern remake of the Ibanez Rhythm maker, vintage looking and sounding guitars.
- Radius series – discontinued, a modified version is now taken over by the Joe Satriani signature series which features a multi-radius neck.
- EX Series – Manufactured in Korea and Japan (rare).
- PL – Pro Line series
- RR – Rocket Roll
- DT – Destroyer
- IC – Iceman – a radical shape endorsed and used by Paul Stanley, Various pickup combinations.
- Talman Series – discontinued
- CN Concert Series – This was a short lived series produced in 1978 then discontinued soon afterwards. It features an asymmetric double cutaway body with two humbuckers, a hard tail bridge and a bolt on neck. The top end model (the CN250) was one of the earliest guitars to feature "half vine" fingerboard inlays.
- Power II series (540PII) – extended length lower cutaway, wide (1 3/4")nut, available in H–H or H–S with edge trem. Often erroneously assumed to be an Alex Skolnick signature model due to his picture in the 88–89 catalogue with a 540PII. Primarily released for the Japanese market, although it has the Bensalem Penn. neck plate.
- AFD – Artfield
- GR – Ghostrider series, arched-top double cutaway design. 24 3/4" scale length. Most notably played by Shawn Lane.
- Cimar by Ibanez
Discontinued signature guitars
- ICJ100WZ – Jay Yuenger Signature
- Stanley Jordan Signature
- AH10 – Allan Holdsworth Signature
- DCM – Dino Cazares Signature
- LR10 – Lee Ritenour Signature
- JP20 – Joe Pass Signature
- MFM – Marty Friedman Signature
- MTM – Mick Thomson Signature
- VM1 – Vinnie Moore Signature
- FGM – Frank Gambale Signature
- JPM – John Petrucci Signature
- RBM2NT – Reb Beach Signature
- DMM1 – Daron Malakian Signature
- MMM – Mike Mushok Signature
- RS1010SL – Steve Lukather Signature
- STM1 – Sam Totman Signature
- NDM1 and NDM2 – Noodles Signature

== Bass guitars ==
=== SR (Soundgear) Series ===
Middle-class model range in the new millennium, though it included expensive high-end and top-of-the-line Japanese models in the late 1980s and 1990s. Later top offerings were branded as Signature and SR Prestige models for clearer segmentation, and all non-Prestige model production moved outside Japan. Current models from the SR250 and up feature soap bar-style humbuckers with active EQ.

==== SR Prestige ====
High-end versions of the Ibanez Soundgear (SR-5004/5/6 & SR-4004/5/6) Bass Guitars made in Japan using exotic woods and high-quality custom Bartolini pickups & new "PWC-III" Power Curve III 3-band EQ with EQ bypass switch to bypass the electronics and take the bass signal directly from the pickups to the output jack. All Japanese-built current production models are in the Prestige series.

==== SR Premium ====
Nordstrand pickups. Indonesian-built.

==== SR Workshop ====
Designated for models used for market testing (for example, multi-scale basses before they were added to regular product lines) and for designs with limited public appeal (such as 30-stop extended-range fingerboards).

=== Others ===
- AFFIRMA series – solidbody basses designed by Rolf Spuler and made in Japan
  - AFR – set neck, one magnetic pickup, and a piezo bridge
  - Original series was launched in the early 1990s, a reissue series was released 2020
- ARTCORE Series – Archtop Basses
  - ARTIST (Model 2626B – Carved-top solid-body set-neck bass, twin humbuckers, made late Seventies.)
  - AFB200 – Hollow-body bass guitar
  - AGB200 – Semihollow-body bass guitar
- ATK Series
  - ATK 300 4-string model
  - ATK 305 5-string model
  - ATK 1200, the Prestige version of the standard ATK, has extra neck pickup
  - ATK 800E, to be released in 2012, a Premium version of the standard ATK. Has extra neck pickup
  - ATK 805E, to be released in 2012, a Premium version of the standard ATK. Has extra neck pickup, 5-string model
- Blazer
- BTB (Boutique Bass) Series
  - BTB 400QM (discontinued)
  - BTB 406QM (Special Edition 6-String Model)
  - BTB Prestige – High-end range which are made in Japan.
  - BTB Iron Label Standard
  - BTB Iron Label Multiscale
- EHB Series - Headless basses, lower end basses have bartolini BH2 pickups, and higher end have nordstrand pickups also, there are a few models with fishman fluence pickups.These models have fishman fluence 3 band preamps as well. There are some models that are multi-scales, and there are some models that have mid switching capabilities, some by switch, and others by knob. There are between 4 strings and 6 strings in this series
- Ergodyne Series – Bodies made from Luthite polymer
  - EDA Series
  - EDB Series
  - EDC Series
- EWB Series
- EX series
- GARTB 20
- GATK 20 – More affordable version of the ATK
- GAXB Series (discontinued)
- GSR Series – A lower-cost version of the Soundgear Series
  - GSR 100 – The original GSR bass guitar (discontinued)
  - GSR 100 EX
  - GSR 105 EX
  - GSR 180
  - GSRM 20
  - GSR 250 M
  - GSR 200
  - GSR 200 FM – The GSR but with different color designs such as sunburst
  - GSR 205 – Nominated for Ibanez's "Best of Model" award
  - GSR 205 FM
- ICB (Iceman) Series
- JTK (Jet King) Series
- JUMPSTART Series – Similar to the GSR Series, named for the Jumpstart Pack which comes with amp and other accessories.
- Musician Series
- ROADGEAR Series
- Roadstar Series
- S series
- SRX Series - Similar to Soundgear but with slab (minimally-rounded) body, wider, thicker neck, and different electronics.
- STUDIO series – Late Seventies bolt-on neck alternative to the Musician series. Included an 8-string bass.
- TR Series

=== Signature basses ===
K5 Fieldy
A custom 5-string Soundgear design w/ "K5" Inlay centered on 12th fret. It was based around a late-1990s then-top-of-the-line Soundgear SR885 owned by the artist, retaining the shape and electronics, but with different colour options and a change of woods to suit his preferences. Early models were Japanese-built, but production later moved to other Asian countries, around the same time Japanese models were rebranded with the Prestige moniker and positioned as the absolute top of the line.

- SDB – Sharlee D'Angelo Signature bass
- PRB – Paul Romanko Signature bass
- GWB – Gary Willis Signature bass
- MDB – Mike D'Antonio Signature bass
- DTB – Dionald Tubang Signature bass
- GVB – Gerald Veasley Signature bass
- VWB1 – Verdine White Signature bass (discontinued)
- PGB – Paul Gray Signature and Tribute bass (discontinued)
- DWB – Doug Wimbish Series

=== Acoustic guitar models ===
- AE Series
  - AE5LG
- AEL Series
- AES Series
- DT Series
- EP9 Series
- EW Series
- GA Series
- JAMPACK Series
- MANDOLIN Series
- MANN Series (Canadian distribution only)
- MASA Series
- PF Series
- PC series
- TALMAN Series
- V Series
- Concord
- SAGE Series
- A300AVV acoustic/electric single cutaway (Ambiance series)

== Amplifiers ==
=== Guitar amplifiers ===
- IBZ
  - IBZ15GR
  - IBZ10G
- TBX Tone Blaster Series
- TSA
  - TSA15/TSA15H
  - TSA30/TSA30H

=== Bass amplifiers ===
- Promethean
- IBZ
- Sound Wave

=== Acoustic amplifiers ===
- Troubadour

== Effect pedals ==
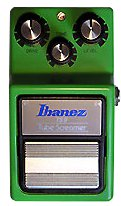
Ibanez TS9 Tube Screamer

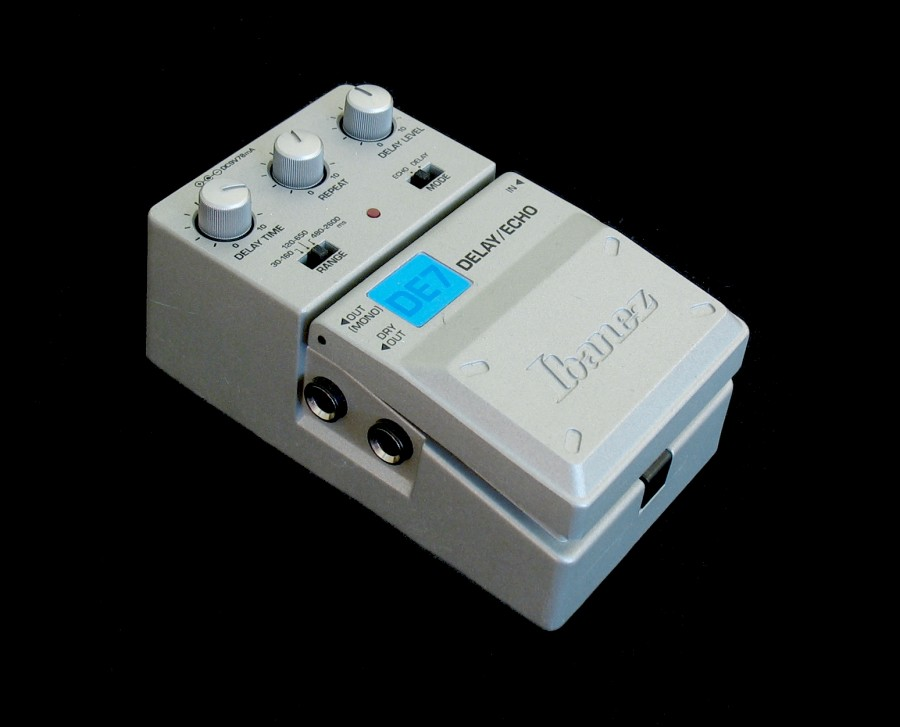
Ibanez DE7 Delay/Echo Pedal

In the 1970s, the Nisshin Onpa company who owned the Maxon brand name, developed and began selling a series of effect pedals in Japan. Hoshino Gakki licensed these for sale using the name Ibanez outside Japan. These two companies eventually began doing less and less business together until Nisshin Onpa ceased manufacturing the TS-9 reissue for Hoshino Gakki in 2002.

- ToneLok Series
  - AP7 Analog Phaser
  - AW7 Autowah
  - CF7 Stereo Chorus/Flanger
  - DE7 Stereo Delay/Echo
  - DS7 Distortion
  - FZ7 Fuzz
  - LF7 Lo-Fi
  - PD7 Phat Hed Bass Overdrive
  - SB7 Synthesizer Bass
  - SH7 Seventh Heaven
  - SM7 Smashbox
  - TC7 Tri Mode Chorus
  - TS7 Tube Screamer
  - WD7 Weeping Demon
  - WD7JR Weeping Demon Junior
- 8 Series
  - AD-80 Analog Delay 1979–1981
  - TS808 Tube Screamer 1979–1981
- 9 series
  - AD9 Analog Delay
  - AF9 Auto Filter
  - BB9 Bottom Booster
  - BC9 Bi-Mode Chorus
  - CP9 Compressor/Limiter
  - CS9 Stereo Chorus
  - FL9 Flanger
  - GE9 Graphic EQ
  - JD9 Jet Driver
  - OD9 Overdrive
  - PQ9 Parametric EQ
  - PT9 Phaser
  - SD9 Sonic Distortion
  - SM9 Super Metal
  - ST9 Super Tube Screamer
  - TS9 Tube Screamer
  - TS9B Bass Tube Screamer
  - TS9DX Turbo Tube Screamer
  - TS930TH 30th Anniversary Tube Screamer
- Wah Pedals
  - WD7
  - WH10V3

== Serial numbers ==
Serial numbers

Ibanez Serial Numbers (non Acoustic)

Japanese Ibanez Serial Numbers

1997 and after (CE logo designation)

- F = FujiGen
- YYXXXXX format
- YY = year (98=1998)
- XXXXX = production number

1987–1997

- F = FujiGen
- H = Terada
- I = Ida Gakki (Iida)
- YXXXXX format
- Y = year (2=1992)
- XXXXX = production number

1975–1986

- MYYXXXX format
- M = Month (A = January to L = December)
- YY = year (82=1982)
- XXXX = production number

Most Ibanez models with this serial number format were made by FujiGen Gakki. Exceptions are the Ibanez Blazer models which were made by Dyna Gakki and the Axstar by Ibanez models AX40, AX45, AX48, AXB50, AXB60, AXB65, AX70, AX75 which were made by Chushin Gakki. The Ibanez Axstar AXB1000 model was made by FujiGen Gakki.

Korean Ibanez Serial Numbers

C = Cor-Tek (Cort), S = Samick(1990–1995), S/SQ = Saehan(Sunghan), P = Peerless (Iida), Y = Yoojin, A = Sae-In.

- YYMMXXXX format
- YY = year (03=2003)
- MM = month (01=January...12=December)
- XXXX = production number

E = Sung-Eum

- YMMXXXX format
- Y = year (9=1999)
- MM = month (01=January...12=December)
- XXXX = production number

W = World

- MYXXXX format
- M=month (1=January...9=September, X=October...Z=December)
- Y=year (3=2003)
- XXXX = production number

Indonesian Ibanez Serial Numbers

I = Cor-Tek (Cort) Indonesia, K = KWO

- YYMMXXXXX format
- YY = year (03=2003)
- MM = month (01=January...12=December)
- XXXXX = production number

Chinese Ibanez Serial Numbers

Z = Yeou Chern, J=Sejung

- YYMMXXXXX format
- YY = year (03=2003)
- MM = month (01=January...12=December)
- XXXXX = production number

Odd Ibanez Serial Numbers

- 2940000 Acoustic
- 2 = Cor-Tek (Cort) Taejan
- YYXXXX format
- YY = year (94=1994)
- XXXX = production number
- Ibanez Ghostrider model numbers GR=Cor-Tek (Cort), MGR=Samick

Older Acoustic

- YYMM (Kato)
- YY = year (82=1982)
- MM = month (01=January...12=December)

Silver Cadet model

- Z = Woo-sin

Pickup Serial Numbers
