= Ibanez JS Series =

Model of electric guitar

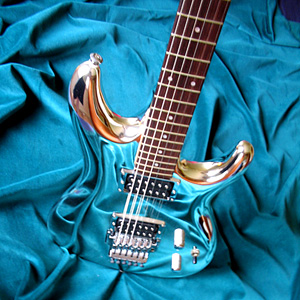
- JS10th Chrome Boy
- Manufacturer: Ibanez
- Period: 1988–present

Construction
- Body type: Solid
- Neck joint: Bolt-on

Woods
- Body: Basswood
- Neck: Maple
- Fretboard: Rosewood

Hardware
- Bridge: JS100: Edge III; JS1000, JS1200: Edge Pro; JS1600: Fixed; JS2000: Fixed Lo Pro Edge
- Pickups: JS100: Ibanez Axis; JS1000, JS1600: DiMarzio PAF Pro (neck), FRED (bridge); JS1200: DiMarzio PAF Joe (neck), Fred (bridge); JS2000: DiMarzio PAF Pro (neck), Fred (bridge)

Colors available
- JS100: Black, White, Transparent Red; JS1000: Black Pearl, Burnt Transparent Blue; JS1200: Candy Apple Red; JS1600: Silver; JS2000: Champagne Gold

The Ibanez JS Series is a signature series of electric guitars endorsed by Joe Satriani and manufactured by Ibanez. It is essentially the discontinued Ibanez Radius series, with Satriani's select pickups installed and some small changes on body, location of knobs and switches and a different neck, which was shaped after one of Joe Satriani's favorite necks. It started as JS1, JS2CH and some rare and limited guitars with graphics made by Donnie Hunt and Joe's Sisters. The JS6 was a mahogany fixed bridge instead of the basswood double locking tremolo guitar version. Mid 90s the JS1 became the JS1000. The JS100 is a lower-end model compared to the JS1000 and the JS1200. The JS1000 and JS1200 feature necks that are digitally reproduced from one of Satriani's guitars. The JS1600 was introduced at the NAMM Show in 2008.

== Timeline dealing with various "Chrome Boys" ==
- 1988 Joe Satriani starts endorsing Ibanez JS series
- 1990 The innovative JS2CH "Chrome Boy" is produced
- 1998 Ibanez releases the JS10th to celebrate their decade long partnership with Joe
- 2005 JS2PRM is revealed at the NAMM Show, just 60 were released
- 2018 JS1CR is the 30th anniversary Ibanez JS signature

=== JS2CH ===
The original Chrome Boy. The JS2CH has a basswood body. There were very few produced as finishing problems occurred with cracking. "Pearly", Joe's prized prototype JS2CH Chrome Boy, was stolen in August 2002 and has never been recovered. Satriani's JS2CH was fitted with a Seymour Duncan Pearly Gates pickup, hence the name "pearly".

=== JS10th ===
The JS10th was Ibanez's second attempt at producing a chromed JS. The JS10th is a unique guitar with a luthite (plastic) body encased in chrome. Chrome plating such a curvy instrument is a very complex and difficult process resulting in many small (and some not so small) imperfections. Ibanez produced 506 of the JS10th model. Satriani himself has stated that he does not use the JS10th, as he prefers the Japanese basswood models (the JS2CH and its prototypes).

=== JS2PRM ===
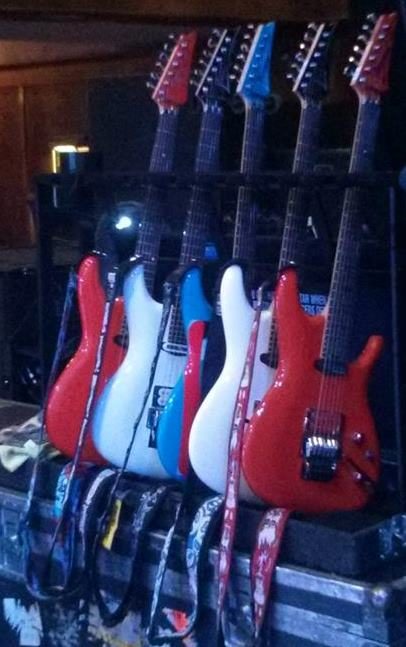
Ibanez JS series guitars used by Satriani on his 2013 Unstoppable Momentum tour

The PRM "Premium Rock Mirror" was revealed at the 2005 NAMM Show and although it belongs to the Chrome Boy family, it is actually basswood plated with aluminum. The first run of 20 had finish issues and the remaining guitars were produced in 2006.

=== JS20th ===
At the 2008 NAMM Show, Ibanez unveiled the JS20th and the JS1600. The JS20th features artwork from Satriani's 1987 album Surfing with the Alien with a chromed relief of the Silver Surfer character.

=== JS1CR ===
The 30th Anniversary Ibanez Joe Satriani Signature JS1CR features an alder body, creating a sound that has influenced contemporary music.

== See also ==
- Ibanez JEM
- Ibanez RG
