= Ibanez PGM =

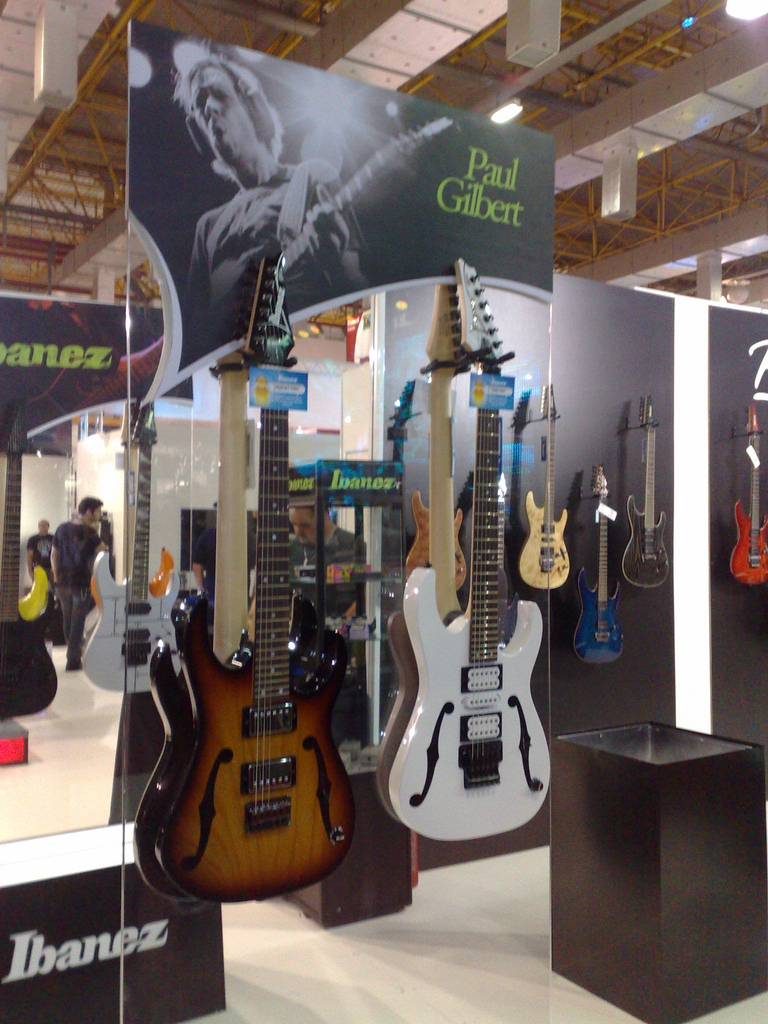
- PGM models at 2010 Expomusic
- Manufacturer: Ibanez
- Period: 1989-present

Construction
- Body type: Solid
- Neck joint: Bolt-on

Woods
- Body: Basswood (varies with sub-model)
- Neck: Maple
- Fretboard: Rosewood, Ebony, Maple (varies with sub-model)

Hardware
- Bridge: Gotoh GTC101 (varies with sub-model)
- Pickup(s): H-S-H DiMarzio PAF Pro / FS-1 / PAF Pro, Five way switching

Colors available
- Varies with sub-model

The Ibanez PGM (short for Paul Gilbert Model) is a series of solid-body electric guitars produced by Ibanez in collaboration with the American virtuoso guitarist Paul Gilbert. Introduced in 1989, the PGM line has become one of Ibanez's most recognizable artist signature series, known for its distinctive painted f-holes, pickup configurations, and high-performance playability tailored to Gilbert’s fast, articulate style.

Over the decades, the PGM series has encompassed a wide range of models—spanning from affordable production instruments to limited-edition, Japan-made masterpieces. The line has seen numerous reissues and design evolutions while maintaining its association with Gilbert's signature tone and aesthetic.

== History ==
By the late 1980s, Paul Gilbert had gained international recognition as a member of the bands Racer X and Mr. Big, both of which showcased his exceptional technical proficiency and melodic sensibility. Gilbert had already been an Ibanez endorser, frequently using modified RG-series guitars. Recognizing his growing influence, Hoshino Gakki, Ibanez's parent company, collaborated with Gilbert to design a signature instrument suited to his stylistic and ergonomic needs.

The first official model, the PGM100, was introduced in 1989, featuring a basswood body, maple neck, reversed headstock, and the now-iconic painted f-holes, which gave the guitar a semi-hollow aesthetic while retaining a solid-body construction. The design became instantly recognizable and closely associated with Gilbert’s stage image.

== Features ==
As of 2007, Ibanez has publicly released 15 PGM guitars including two anniversary models and the acoustic PGA1000.

Most PGM model guitars have the same body shape as the Ibanez RG guitar models with removed tone knob and volume knob placed to Paul Gilbert's personal preference. Some are usually available with a fixed bridge, others such as the PGM30 of 1995 feature a Lo-TRS double-locking tremolo system and a 24-fret maple neck with rosewood, ebony or maple fingerboard. Although PGM guitars come in various colors they all have two painted F-holes which gives the illusion that it is a semi-hollow bodied guitar, and many have a reversed headstock that changes the typical string length and make them easily distinguishable from an Ibanez RG. The short-lived PGM900TC of 1998 was a Talman finished in Transparent Crimson and fitted with dual humbuckers and a stoptail bridge.

When it comes down to playing a straight, no-nonsense, face-melting shred guitar solo, I go straight to my PGM301. It is the easiest guitar to play in my whole collection, and still has the best balance of picking clarity and percussive thickness.

— Paul Gilbert

== Models and variations ==
- PGM3
- PGM30
- PGM100
- PGM100RE
- PGM200
- PGM300
- PGM300RE
- PGM301
- PGM400
- PGM401
- PGM500
- PGM600
- PGM700
- PGM800
- PGM900
- PGM10th
- PGM90th
- PGM80P
- PGMM31
- PGMM21
- PGM333
- PGM50
- FRM100
- FRM150
- FRM200
- FRM250
- FRM300
- FRM350
- PGMFRM1

== See also ==
- Ibanez
- Paul Gilbert
