= JTK =

JTK may refer to:

- Ibanez Jet King, a family of electric guitars
- James T. Kirk, a character in the Star Trek media franchise
- Jatake railway station, a railway station in Indonesia
- Jeff the Killer, a creepypasta story
- Junior Tia-Kilifi (born 1988), New Zealand rugby league player
