= Antoria =

British guitar brand

Antoria Guitars
- Current owner: Tim Gentle Music
- Country: United Kingdom
- Introduced: 1950s
- Markets: Worldwide
- Previous owners: List: John Lawson (1980s–2006); Adam Hall Ltd. (2007–10); Tim Gentle Music (2010–)
- Website: antoriaguitars.com

Antoria is a UK guitar brand dating back to the 1950s, which has changed hands three times. Originally the brand consisted of guitars made in Japan (first by Guyatone and then by FujiGen); contemporary Antorias come from South Korea and China.

Current products commercialised under the Antoria brand are electric, acoustic guitars and basses.

== History ==
The Antoria brand consisted of Guyatone-made guitars exported to the UK from Japan. Hank Marvin played an Antoria LG50 prior to Cliff Richard buying him his more famous Fender Stratocaster. Jeff Beck played one, as did Big Jim Sullivan when he was playing with Marty Wilde. They were imported by James T. Coppock (Leeds) Ltd, Charles Summerfield Ltd and J. L. Music Ltd. Some Antoria guitars may have been manufactured in Bavaria, Germany, by Framus.

In the 1970s, Antoria imported guitars made in the FujiGen factory, which also manufactured Ibanez guitars. Later, production shifted to Korea, where, among other models, an imitation Gibson ES-335 was made (a model also sold under the Harmony brand).

James T. Coppock ceased trading in the early 1980s and Antoria guitar production ceased. Then, probably in the 1980s, John Lawson acquired the brand and distributed guitars using the name until 2006. In January 2007, the Antoria brand was purchased by Adam Hall Limited, and then in 2010 by Tim Gentle Music of Stockton-on-Tees. The new Antoria electric guitars are manufactured in South Korea, and their acoustic and electro-acoustic guitars in China.
