= Guyatone =

Japanese guitar manufacturer

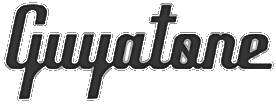
- Industry: Musical instrument
- Founded: 1933; 93 years ago as "Matsuki Manufacturing" in Yamanashi
- Founder: Mitsuo Matsuki
- Headquarters: Oswego, United States
- Key people: Toshihiko Torii (Engineer); Nathaniel DeMont (Owner)
- Products: Electric guitars, amplifiers, effects units
- Parent: DeMont Guitars LLC
- Website: guyatone.com

Guyatone (Japanese: グヤトーン or ガイアトーン) is a Japanese guitar brand and manufacturing company that produces electric guitars, guitar amplifiers, and effect pedals. In the 1930s, the predecessor company was established as the oldest electric guitar manufacturer in Japan, and produced guitars under Guya brand until 1940. In 1948 after WWII, the company was re-established to produce electric Hawaiian guitars. In 1951, Guyatone brand was established for electric guitars, and in 1955, their first solid-body guitar was introduced.

During the late-1950s to mid-1960s, the trends of surf music caused the electric guitar boom, and riding on this big wave, Guyatone electric guitars with unique designs and low prices were exported to Europe and America under the various brands, and played by various guitarists including Hank Marvin from the Shadows, Jimi Hendrix in the early days, Steve Howe of Yes, and others.

Over the 90 years of history, Guyatone encountered three crises in 1940, 1968 and 2013. In the mid-2010s, the company and the brand were taken over by Toshihiko Torii (former Guyatone R&D engineer) and Nate DeMont (DeMont Guitar), then merged as the Guyatone & DeMont Guitars LLC.

== History ==
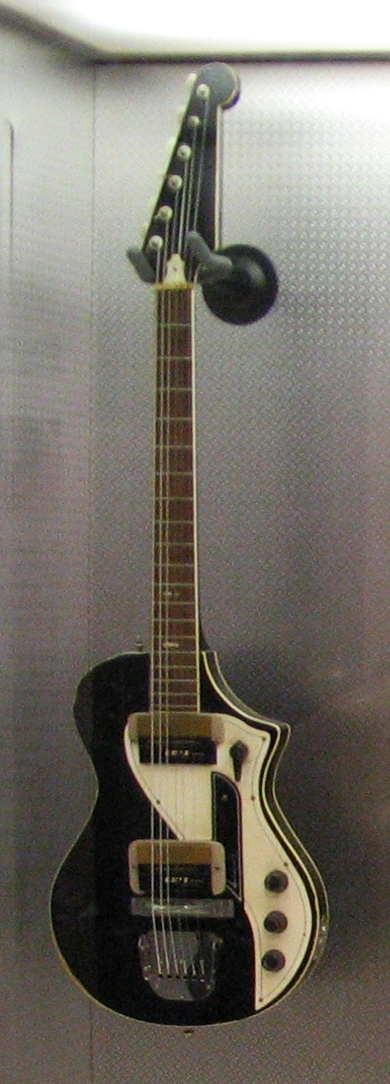
LG-60B (1959)

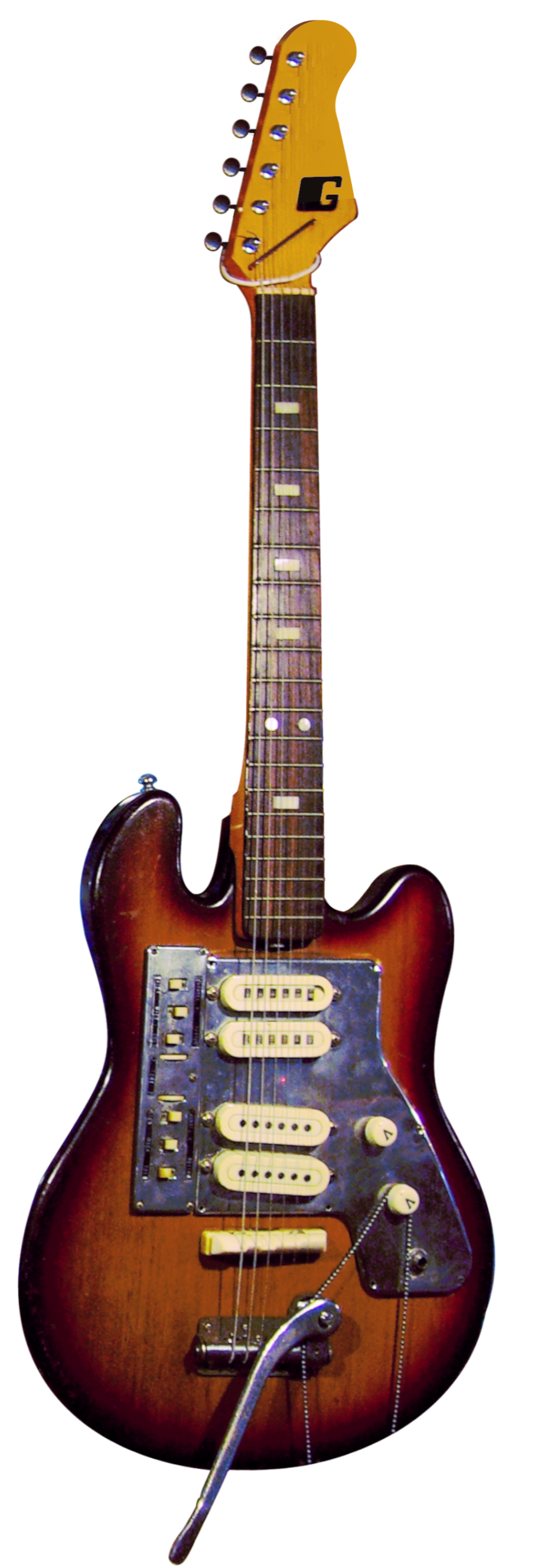
LG-140T (c.1964-65)

(Left: Rory Gallagher's collection exhibited at Harrods in 2007)

Guyatone was founded in 1933. According to Hiroyuki Noguchi, editor of Japan's Guitar Magazine, Matsuki Seisakujo (松木製作所) was founded by Mitsuo Matsuki and his friend Atsuo Kaneko, who later became a famous player of Hawaiian and Spanish style guitars. Kaneko co-founded Teisco in 1946.

Hawaiian music was becoming increasingly popular at the time, leading Kaneko to inquire to his friend Matsuki about building an electric Hawaiian guitar using his woodworking and electronics skills. Matsuki had been enrolled in electronics classes. In the late 1930s the Matsuki Seisakujo was founded, producing and selling mostly Rickenbacker-style guitars under the Guya name.

In 1940, Matsuki was drafted into the war between China and Japan and production halted for several years. After returning home, Matsuki formed his own company, "Matsuki Denki Onkyo Kenkyujo" (松木電気音響研究所, English: Matsuki Electric Sound Laboratory).

In 1951 Matsuki began to use the Guyatone name on his instruments. The company began to make amplifiers and cartridges for record players. These cartridges found a large market after being routinely used by NHK, a government-owned broadcasting station. In 1952 or 1956 (sources disagree), the name of the corporation was changed to Tokyo Sound Company (東京サウンド(株)). In 1968, it was changed to Guya Co., Ltd. ((株)グヤ) and then back to Tokyo Sound Co. once again.

According to correspondence with Toshihiko Torri, head of R&D at Guyatone, the Tokyo Sound factory began large-scale production in 1956. Guyatone's records indicate them as being founded on July 16, 1956. By the late 1950s or early 1960s, they made up to 1,500 slide guitars, 1,600 electric guitars and basses, 2,000 guitar amplifiers, and 5,000 microphones a month.

During the late-1950s to 1960s, Guyatone guitars were distributed under various brands by other manufacturers/distributors:

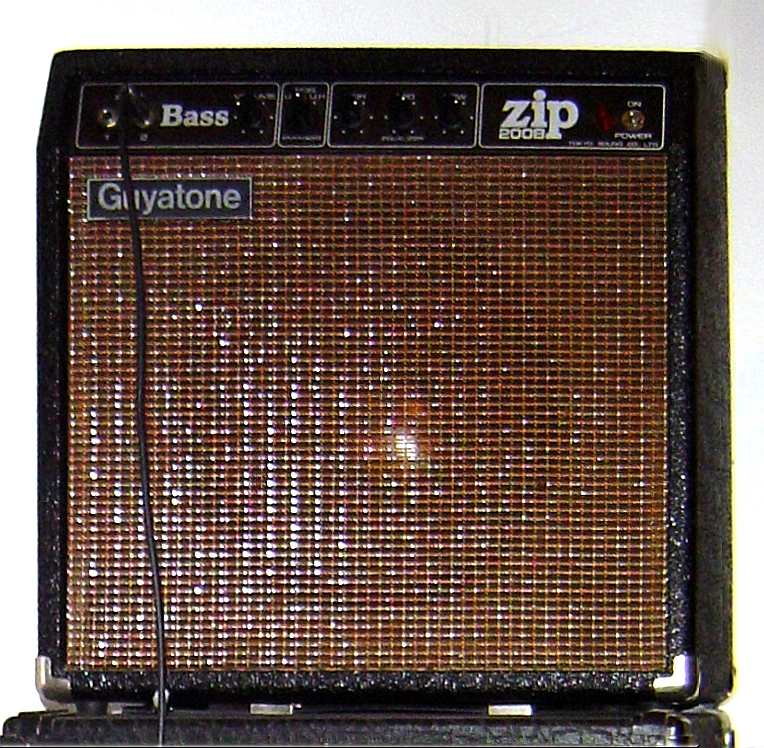
ZIP200B (1979) bass amp

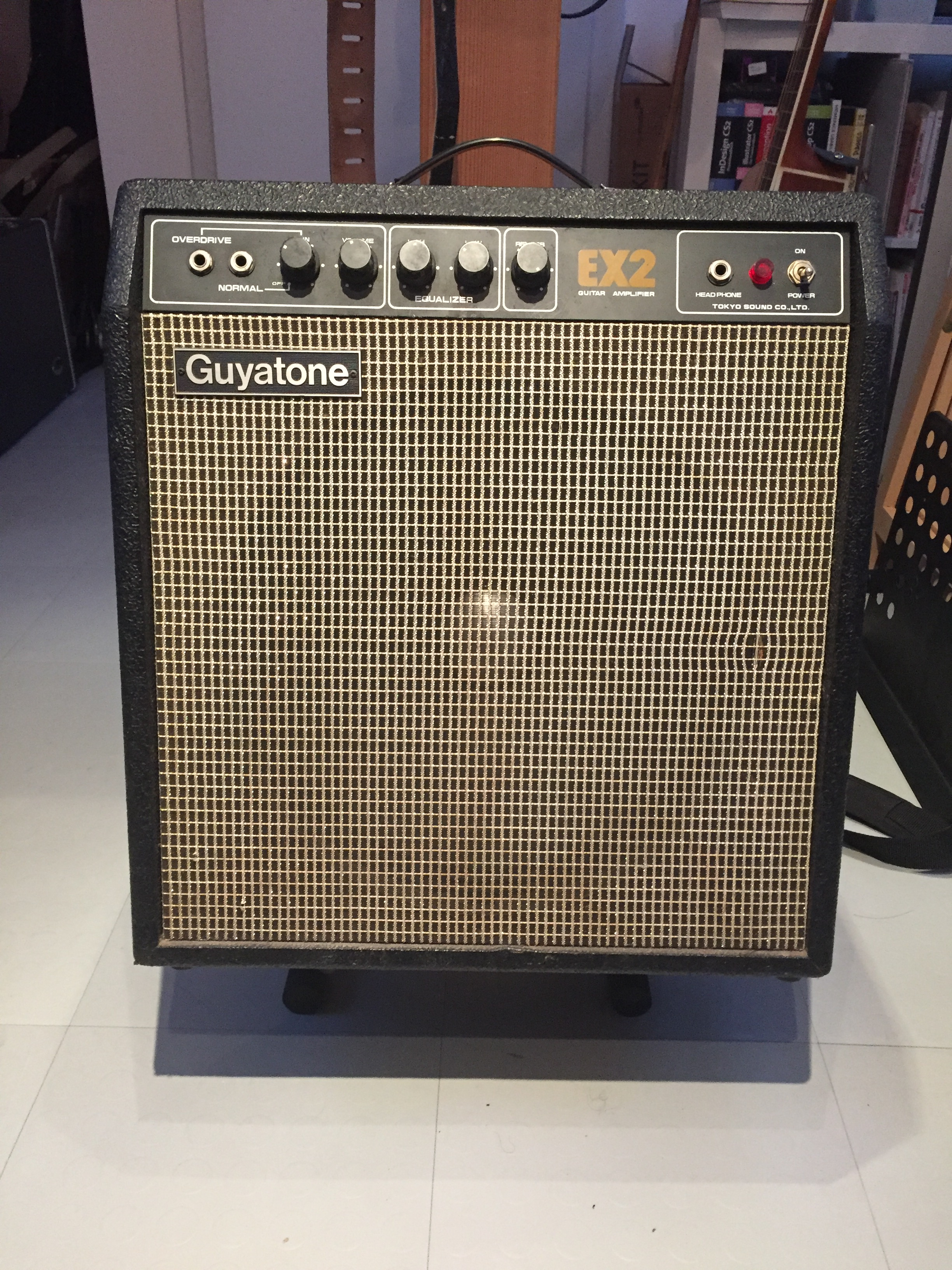
EX2 Solid state guitar amp with 15-inch speaker

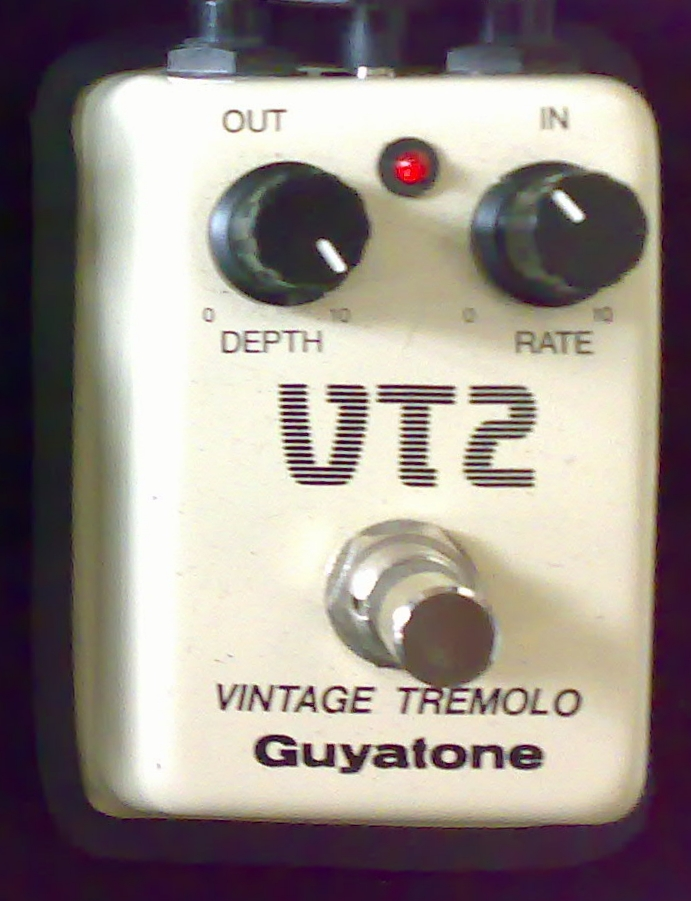
VT2 Vintage Tremolo (micro effect series)

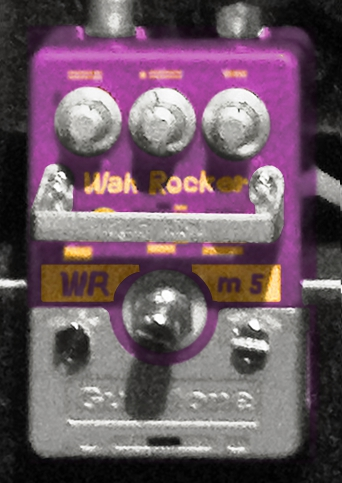

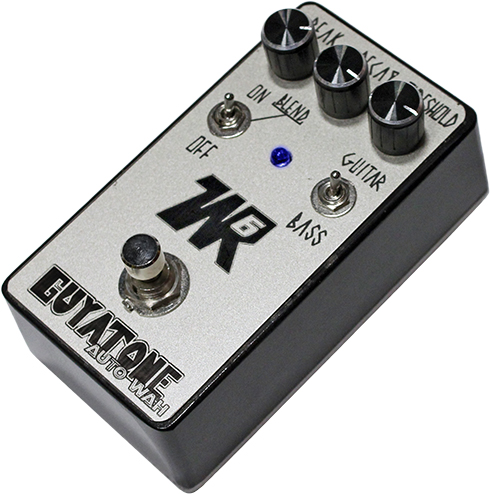
WR6 Auto Wah

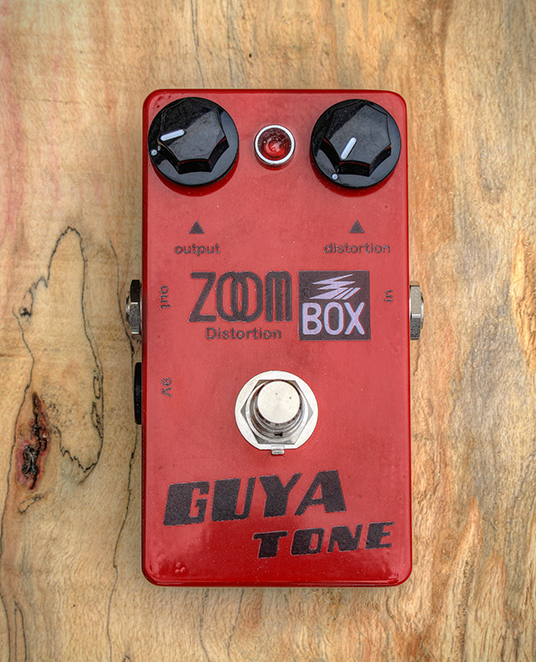
Zoom Box USA Made Limited Reissue

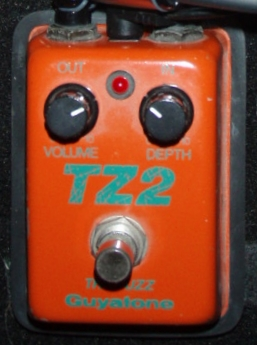
TZ2, the Fuzz (micro effect series)

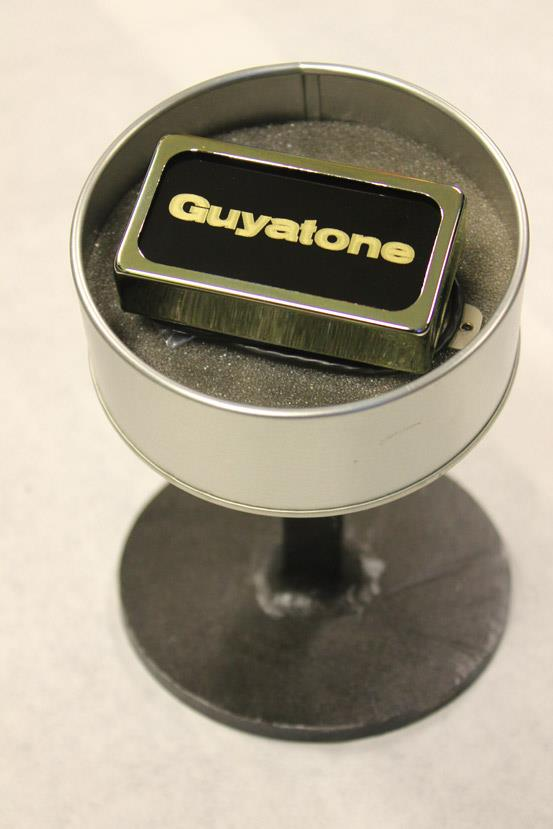
Prototype Humbucker

- In Japan, Hoshino Gakki had exported Guyatone under the Star and Ibanez brands, before the Tama factory was opened in 1962. Their model 1830 (created c. 1960, LG-70) or model 1860 "Rhythm Maker" (created 1960) is said to be a model for which Jimi Hendrix had traded in his Danelectro, in 1962. Then, this model was roughly copied by Kawai as model "S-180" (1964), and some models were also manufactured by FujiGen. The copied model by Kawai, or FujiGen, was played by Hound Dog Taylor as seen on his first album Hound Dog Taylor and the HouseRockers in 1971. Ibanez reissued the Rhythm Maker as Jet King 2 (2004–2007).
- In the United Kingdom, James T. Coppock (Leeds) Ltd. had introduced Guyatone under Antoria in the late 1950s, and these guitars were played by Hank Marvin, Marty Wilde, Rory Gallagher, Johny Guitar, and Ringo Starr from the Hurricanes, and even possibly young Jeff Beck. Also, Conn-Selmer UK had introduced the Guyatone under their low budget brands, Freshman and Futurama, in the late 1950s. After the early success in the UK, its market had broadened further: for example, its early bolt-on neck model LG-40 is known to have been sold by multiple importers including: J.Mauriat, Rose Morris (under Broadway brand), and Bell Music of Epsom.
- In the United States, Buegeleisen and Jacobson (B&J) in New York City had introduced Guyatone under Kent, along with re-badged brands such as Saturn, Marathon, Starlight, Royalist, and others. Kent guitars, established in 1960, were initially manufactured by Hagström, then also manufactured by Guyatone, Kawai, FujiGen, Teisco, and Matsumoku.

In 2013 "Tokyo Sound Co. Ltd." was closed down and transferred ownership of the "Guyatone" name to Hiroshi Matsuki (松木裕), son of the founder of Tokyo Sound Co., and brother to the president of the company, re-opening and re-organizing a short time later that same year. Guyatone now continues operations in its US office in Oswego, IL, USA with partner company DeMont MFG LLC. Later, DeMont MFG LLC was purchased and absorbed into "DeMont Guitars" along with all assets.

The Guyatone company is now owned by former R&D Guyatone engineer, Toshihiko Torii (DeMont Japan), and Nate DeMont (DeMont Guitars / Guyatone).

The DeMont / Guyatone Manufacturing facility sustained a fire in December 2017.

In Japan, Guyatone began the development of a patented injection-molded guitar pick which uses small differences in contours and thickness, as well as material types, to change the feel of the pick instead of the traditional thickness of the plastic.

In late 2018, Guyatone launched its website.
