= Ibanez K5 =

Type of bass guitar

- Manufacturer: Ibanez
- Period: 2002 — present

Construction
- Body type: Solid

Woods
- Body: Padauk / Mahogany
- Neck: Maple / Walnut
- Fretboard: Rosewood with K5 inlay at the 12th fret

Hardware
- Bridge: Aluminum Die Cast 5-string bridge
- Pickup(s): IBZ ADX5N (neck position); IBZ ADX5B (bridge position)

Colors available
- TKF: Transparent Black Flat

The Ibanez K5 is the signature bass for metal band Korn's bassist Reginald Fieldy Arvizu.

== Specification ==
Fieldy from Korn has long played Ibanez Basses due to their low weight and signature sound; he got an endorsement deal with Ibanez soon after the breakthrough of Korn. The five string K5 bass is designed by Ibanez along with Fieldy and includes a Mahogany body, Rosewood fretboard with 24 frets and a K5 inlay at the 12th fret, gold hardware, two active pickups and a Vari-Mid EQ. To achieve his signature sound Fieldy tunes his basses to A, D, G, C, F, turns the midrange all the way off and brings down the EQ all the way down at 180 Hz. This makes Fieldys bass stand out from the low end of the two seven string guitars instead of getting too muddy.

I've played all kinds of basses. I've got other companies that want me to endorse, but I don't like any other basses. I'm not like some people who play an instrument because of a contract. I'm playing it because I love it.

— Fieldy, "Ibanez - The Untold Story" ISBN 978-0-9764277-0-4
