= Cimar =

Hoshino Gakki guitar brand

- Type: Private
- Industry: Musical instruments
- Founded: 1976
- Defunct: 1982
- Headquarters: Nagoya, Japan
- Area served: Global
- Products: Guitars, Bass guitars
- Owner: Hoshino Gakki

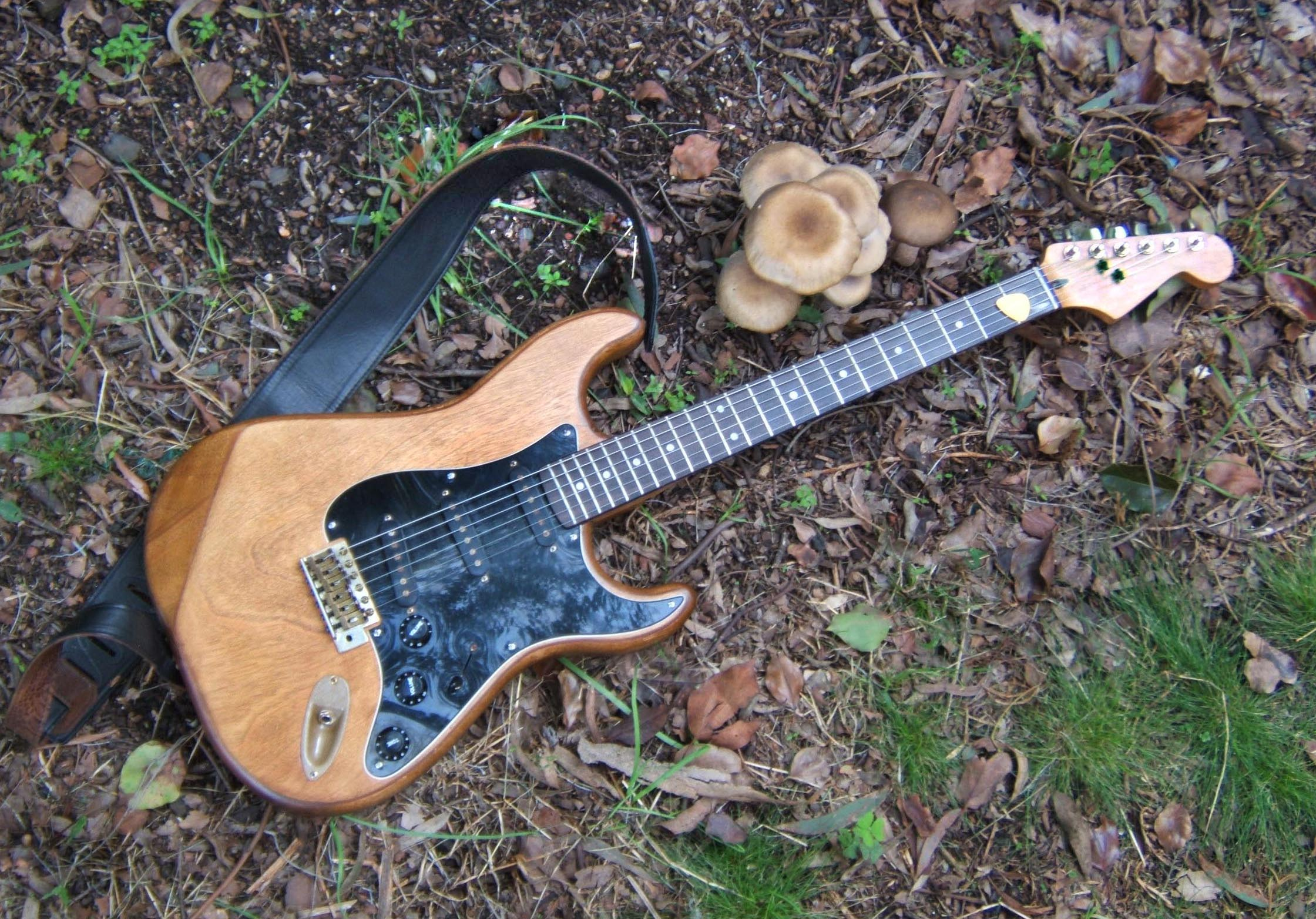
Cimar Stratocaster with replaced neck

Cimar was a Hoshino Gakki guitar brand. Designs of Cimar guitars are sometimes very similar to Hoshino Gakki's Ibanez guitar brand. Cimar guitars appear in Hoshino Gakki catalogues.
