= Ibanez Talman =

Series of guitars

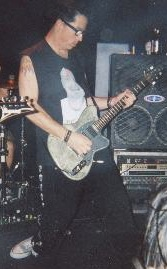
- Kevin "Noodles" Wasserman playing Talman
- Manufacturer: Ibanez
- Period: 1994 - 1998, 2015 — present

Construction
- Body type: Solid, hollow-body acoustic
- Neck joint: Bolt-on, Set-in

The Ibanez Talman series of guitars consists of various electric and acoustic models. Introduced in 1994, initial production of the electric guitar models ended in 1998. In 2003, the first in a line of a group of acoustic and acoustic-electric guitars debuted. Other than the Noodles Signature Models of electric guitar, Ibanez introduced a new line of Talman electric guitar models in November 2015, including Standard and Prestige versions.

== Models ==
=== Electric models ===
==== TC series ====
- TC530 (Produced in 1994)
- TC620 (Produced between 1995 and 1996)
- TC630 (Produced between 1995 and 1997)
- TC730 (Produced in 1996)
- TC820 (Produced in 1996)
- TC830 (Produced in 1996)
- TC420 (Produced between 1995 and 1998)
- TC740 (Produced between 1997 and 1998)
- TC825 (Produced between 1997 and 1998)
- TC220 (Produced in 1998)
- TC720 (Produced in 1998)

==== TV series ====
- TV650 (Produced in 1994)
- TV750 (Produced in 1994)
- TV550 (Produced in 1995)

==== TM Prestige series ====
- TM1702 (Produced between 2015 and 2016)
- TM1702M (Produced between 2015 and 2017)
- TM1730 (Produced between 2015 and 2017)
- TM1730M (Produced between 2015 and 2017)
- TM1803M (Produced between 2015 and 2017)
- TM1702AHM (Produced between 2016 and 2017)
- TM1730AHM (Produced in 2016)
- TM1702P (Produced in 2017)
- TM1730P (Produced in 2017)

==== TM Standard series ====
- TM302M (Produced between 2015 and 2017)
- TM330M (Produced between 2015 and 2017)
- TM302 (Produced between 2016 and 2017)
- TM302BM (Produced between 2016 and 2017)
- TM302HM (Produced between 2016 and 2017)
- TM302PM (Produced between 2016 and 2018)
- TM303M (Produced between 2016 and 2018)
- TM330P (Produced in 2017)

==== TM J-Line series ====
- TM730 (Japan exclusive)

==== Signature models ====
- PGM900 (Paul Gilbert signature model)
- NDM1, NDM2, NDM3, NDM4 & NDM5 (Noodles signature models)
- YY10, YY20 (Yvette Young signature models)

=== Acoustic models ===
This series has been in production since 2003.

- TCY20VV
- TCY20TRS
- TCY15ERD
- TCY10ETBS
- TCY10EBK
- TCM50VBS
- TCY740 - a variant folk-configuration guitar. Mahogany body; nut and saddle in ivorex 2; X frame; Fishman Sonicore preamplifier. Two models: the first with a number ending by 1201, and a second ending by 1202. For the model ending by 1202, at least 834 units have been made in China. 2014 final year.

In '97, the Talman line shrank to the TC630 plus two new models, the TC825 (sparkle-finished alder, two Super 58s, Bigsby) and TC740 (alder, two lipsticks and one V8 humbucker, vibrato). The Talman's next-to-the-last gasp came in '98, when they were joined by TC220 (agathis, two humbuckers, vibrato) and a lefty version of the TC420L. After '98, the Talman line expired, except for being reprised later as an acoustic/electric model.

— Vintage Guitar magazine, July 2005

== Players ==
Artists known playing an Ibanez Talman are:

- Tom Morello (Rage Against the Machine) owns a custom Ibanez Talman with a Kenyan flag finish and a white one with 2 humbuckers.
- Noodles (The Offspring) has played different TC and TV Models from 1994 onward and has five signature Talman models; NDM1, NDM2 NDM3, NDM4, and NDM5
- Yvette Young (Covet) owns several Talmans, including two signature model releases: the strat-style Talman YY10 in "slime-green sparkle", and tele-style YY20 in "orange cream sparkle."
- David Williams (Michael Jackson) owns an Ibanez Talman.
- Aron Garceau (Prydein) plays electric Talmans exclusively, mainly a Blue Sparkle TC825 and a Metallic Avocado TC620 and a Black TC420.
- Will Salazar (Fenix TX) can be seen playing a Talman in their music video for "All My Fault."
- Thurston Moore and Kim Gordon (Sonic Youth), purchased after the gear theft in July 1999, still used occasionally by Kim.
- Bob 2 (formerly of Devo) played a green and red Talman from the 1990s up until his death in 2014.
- Shark (Wild Colonials) can be seen playing a black Ibanez Talman in their music video for the 1996 single "Charm".
