= Ibanez Jet King =

Electric guitar

- Manufacturer: Ibanez

Construction
- Body type: Solid
- Neck joint: Bolt-on

Woods
- Body: Basswood(JTK1) Mahogany(JTK2,3,4)
- Neck: Maple

Hardware
- Bridge: Tune-o-matic

Colors available
- Varies with Model

The Ibanez Jet King is the term for a family of electric guitars sold by Ibanez. The family includes:

- Jet King 1 (JTK1) — resembles EJ-2 by FujiGen and Teisco MJ-2.
- Jet King 2 (JTK2) — resembles Ibanez Rhythm Maker by Guyatone in 1960s.
- Jet King 3 (JTK3)
- Jet King 4 (JTK4)

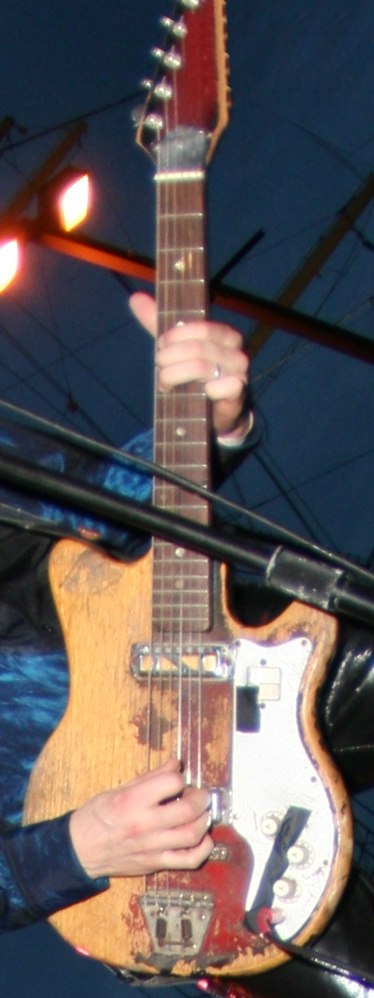
1960s ZimGar / FujiGen EJ-2-T

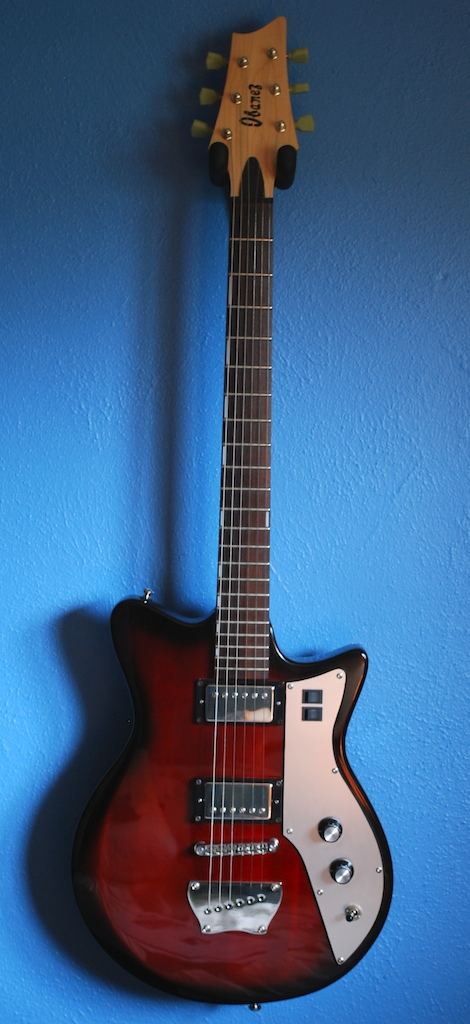
Jet King 1 (JTK1) resembles 1960s FujiGen EJ-2-T, and position markers of Teisco model.

== Jet King 1 ==
According to the Harmony Central press release the original JTK1 had the following pickups: Neck Pickup: Powersound PSND1 Humbucker, Bridge Pickup: Powersound PSND2 Humbucker. Some owners of the JTK1 have however reported finding Ibanez Super 58 pickups... although whether these were later production models and shortly before the phasing towards JTK2 is unestablished. It had a different body compared to later versions, with a smaller upper horn and the tuners were 3-a-side. It was available in Butterscotch Transparent, Ivory, Metallic Light Blue, and Black Red Sunburst.

== Jet King 2 ==
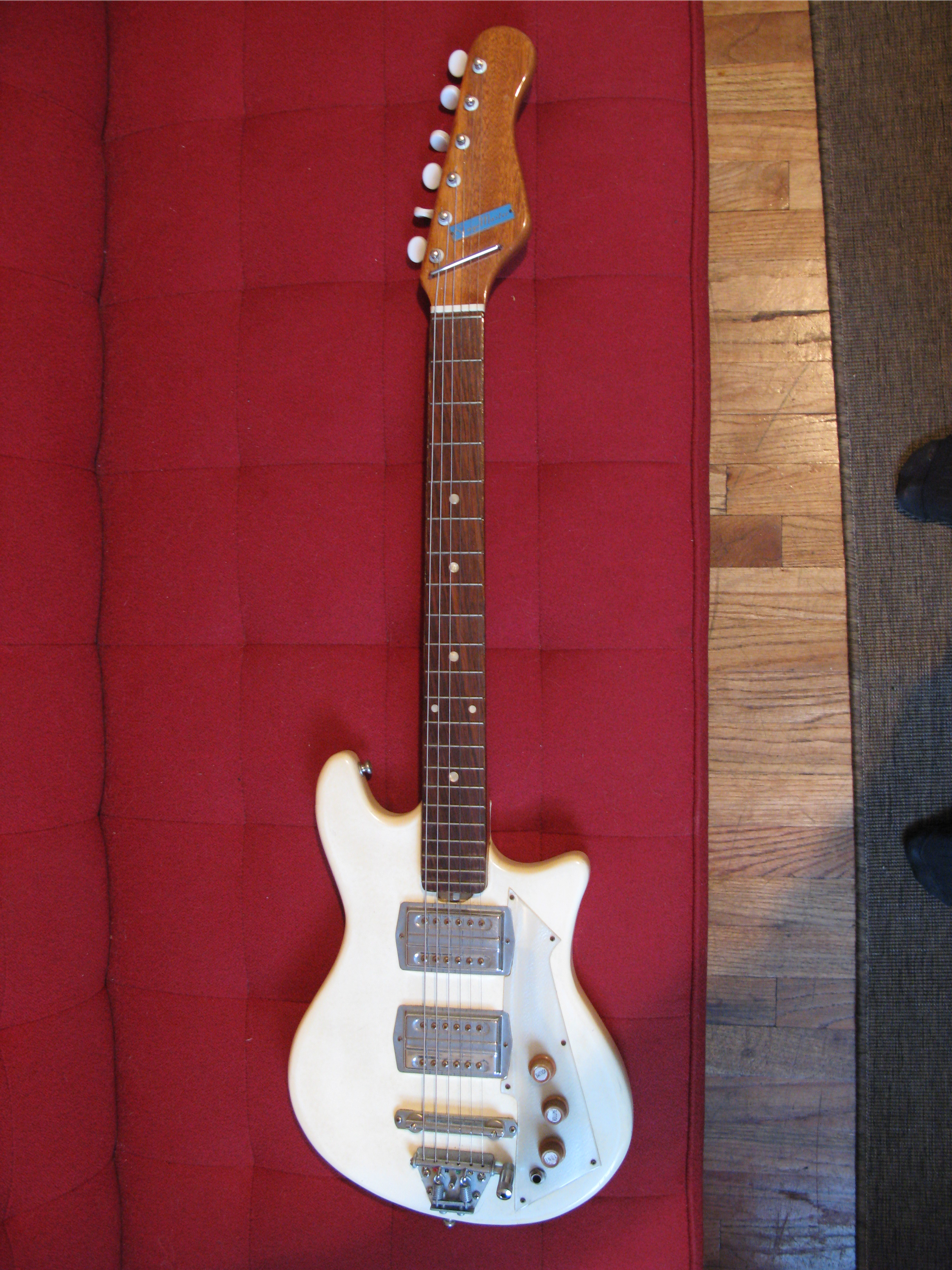
1960s StageMaster (model 904) was slightly similar to Rhythm Maker

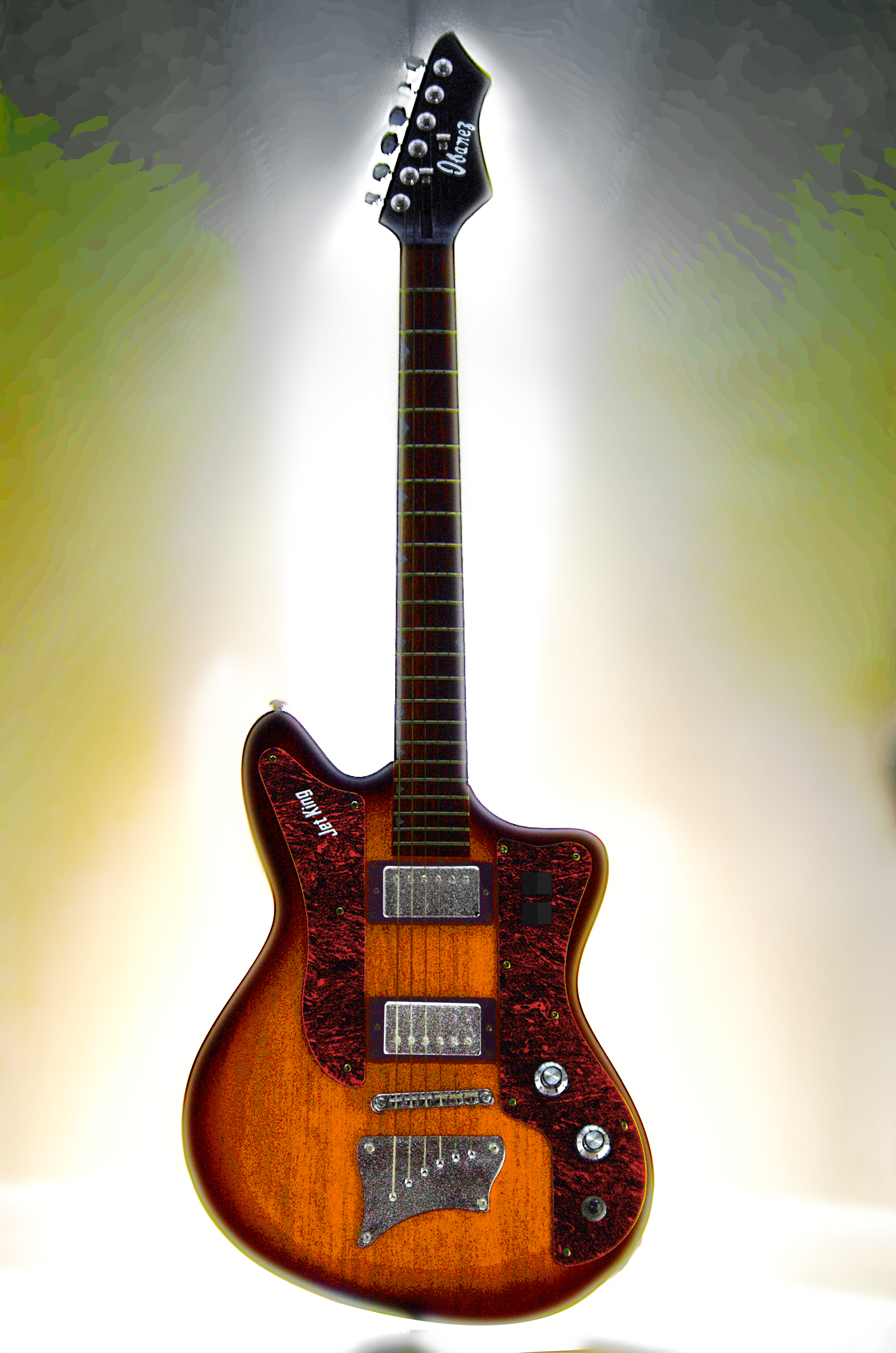
Jet King 2 (JTK2), resembles Ibanez Rhythm Maker in 1960s.

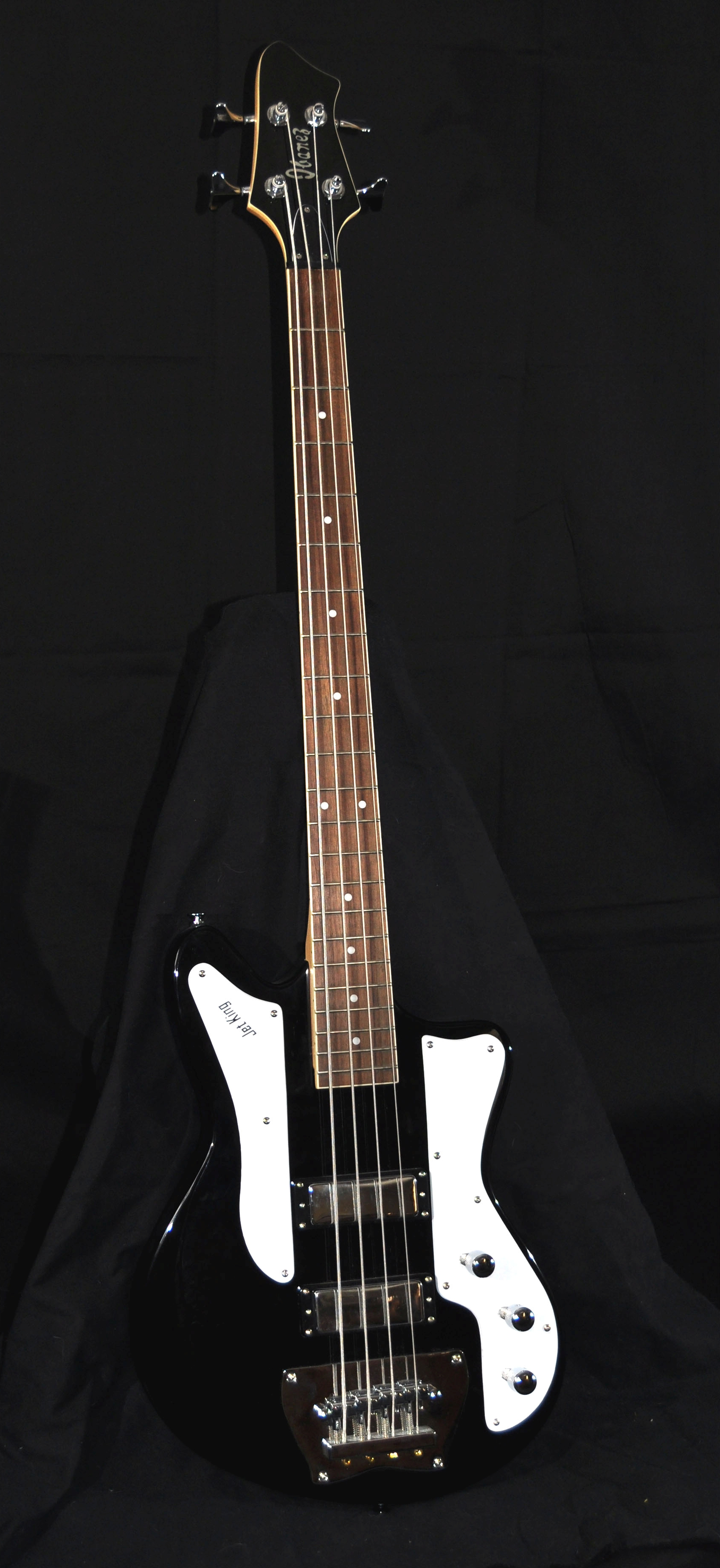
Jet King Bass (JTKB200), bass version of Jet King 2

The Jet King 2 (Also, Jet King II, Jetking II, JTK2) was essentially an upgrade of the original. The machine heads now were on one side, and the body was changed to its current shape.

The first and discontinued edition of the Jet King II is probably the most collectible of all the range. The body is finished in brown sunburst with tortoise pickguard and has two Ibanez Super 58 pickups for neck and bridge. The Jet King II models made from 2003/11 to 2004/10 features a 1-piece maple bolt-on neck with rosewood fingerboard and the body is mahogany. The second and most popular edition of the JTK 2 (black and white and red and white) has only one Super 58 pickup for the neck, one Axis pickup for the bridge and a 3-piece neck like most Ibanez guitars. Standard colors for the Jet King II second edition were black or red with white pickguards, though examples of a white body and black pickguards have been seen. The Ibanez Super 58 pickup has a warm vintage sound while the Axis has a brighter and more aggressive sound. It has one volume knob, one tone knob, "rocker switches" used for coil splitting (for even more versatility), a fixed Full Tune III bridge and a string-thru body construction, providing fair sustain. The "rocker switches" allow this guitar to be very versatile. Some players claim it can imitate a Fender Jazzmaster or a Gibson Les Paul.

== Jet King 3 and 4 ==
At the 2007 NAMM Show, two new Jet Kings were revealed. The "retro-style" mahogany body remained the same; however, unlike its predecessors, no rocker coil splits were included on the new models.

The Jet King 3 features two P-90 style soapbar pickups, the IBZ HFS1, and IBZ HFS2. Standard colors are "Roadster Orange Metallic" and "Bluestone." "Turquoise", and "Red Bean" colors are available in limited markets.

The Jet King 4 featured a Bigsby-style tremolo and two humbuckers, the ACH3 neck pickup and ACH4 bridge pickup.

== Related ==
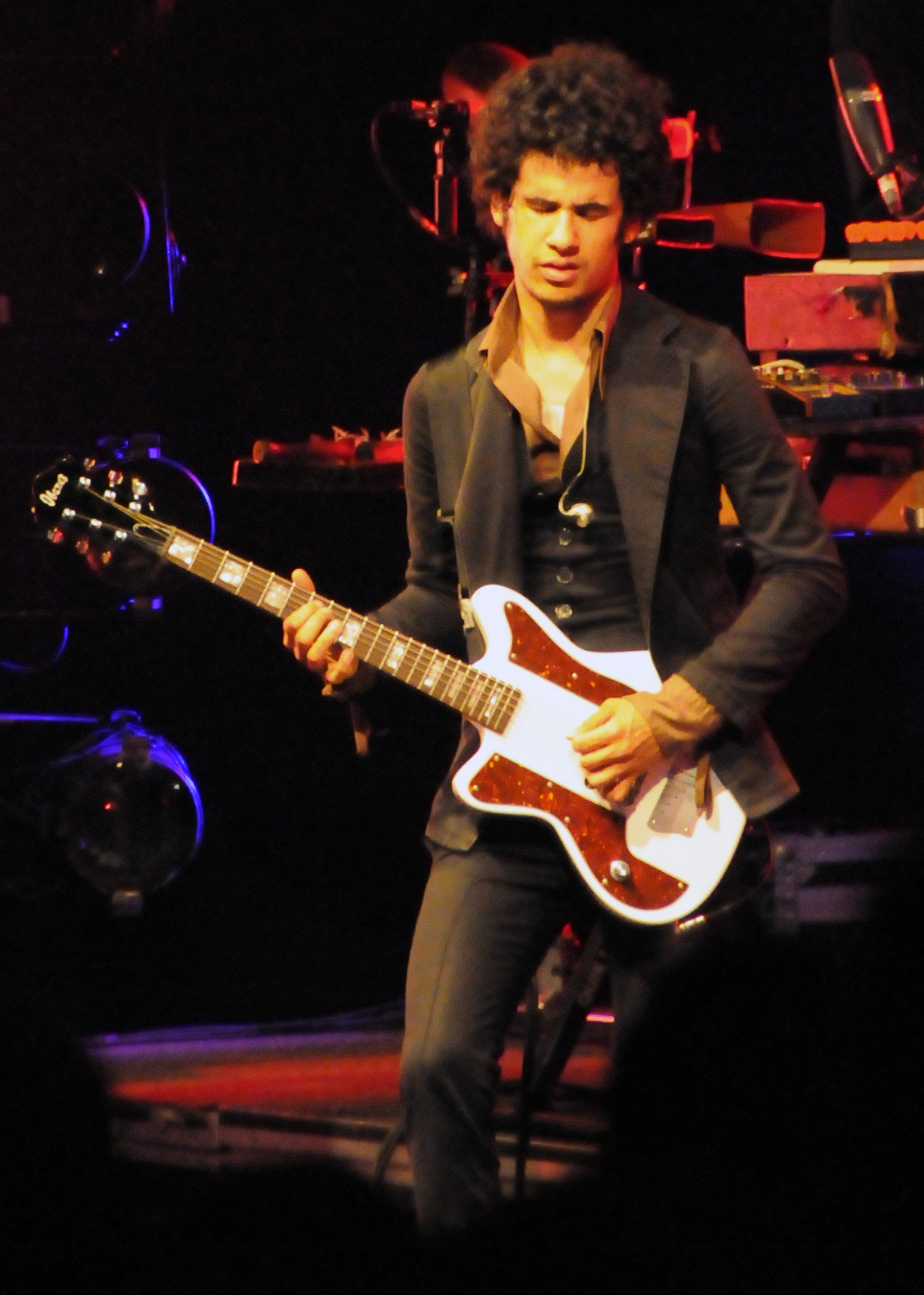
Omar Rodríguez-López with ORM1

Other related Ibanez guitars are:

- The Jet King Bass (JTKB200BS)
- The Rhythm Maker (model 1830~1880 in 1960s)
- The ORM1 (Omar Rodríguez-López signature model)

== Notable Jet King players ==
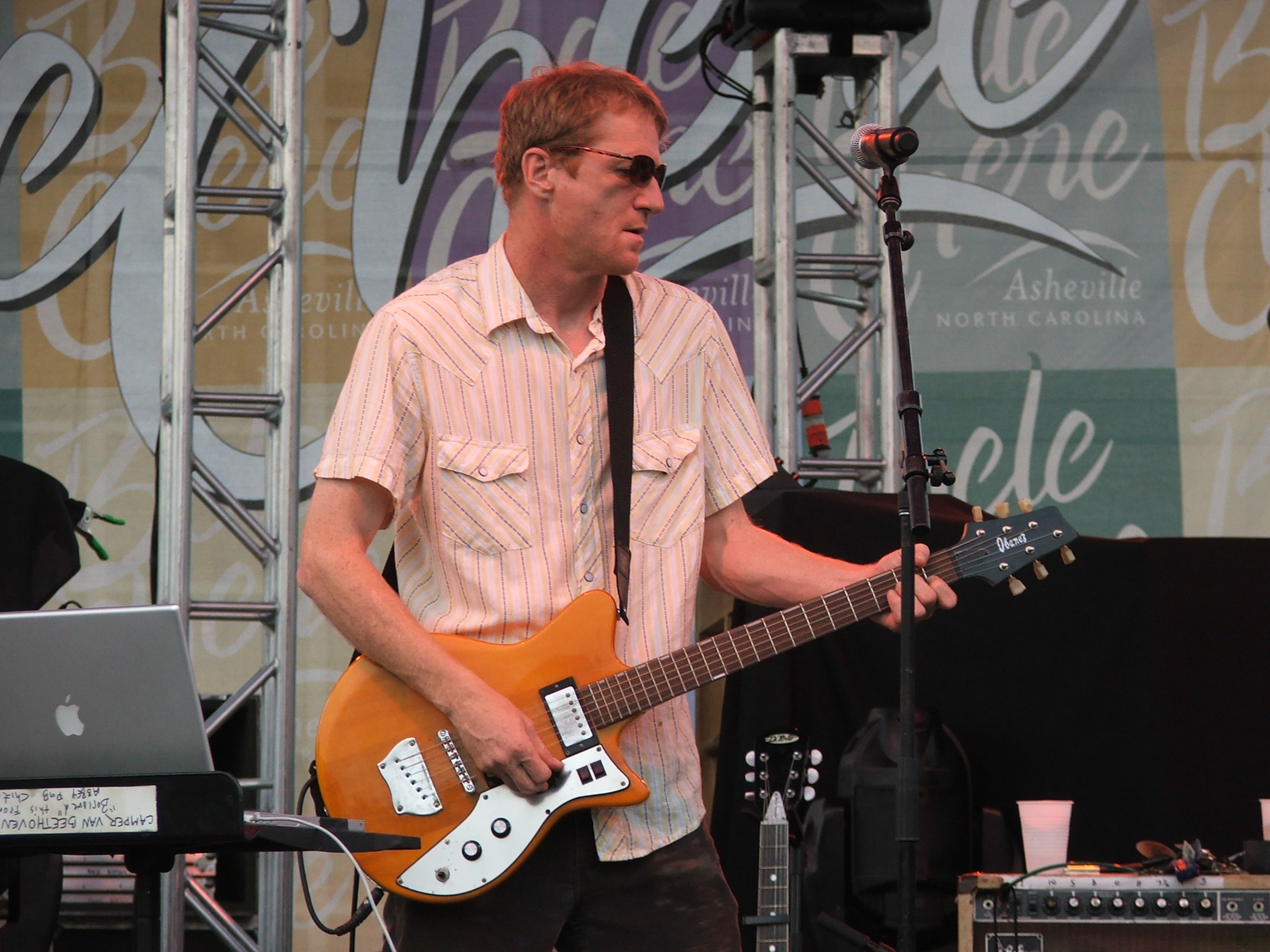
David Lowery (Cracker) with JTK1

- Jimi Hendrix
- Matt Hollywood, The Brian Jonestown Massacre
- Andy Jackson, Hot Rod Circuit
- Brittany Howard, Alabama Shakes
- David Lowery, Camper Van Beethoven, Cracker
- Omar Rodriguez-Lopez, The Mars Volta
- Jason Weiche, "Stolas", "The Akashic Record"
- Niall Kennedy, And So I Watch You From Afar
- Adam Hopper, Blanketman

== See also ==
- FujiGen — JTK1 is originated in EJ-2-T by FujiGen in 1960s.
- Guyatone — JTK2 is originated in Ibanez Rhythm Maker supplied by Gutatone in 1960s.
- $100 Guitar Project
