= Luthite =

Material used to construct the body of bass and electric guitars

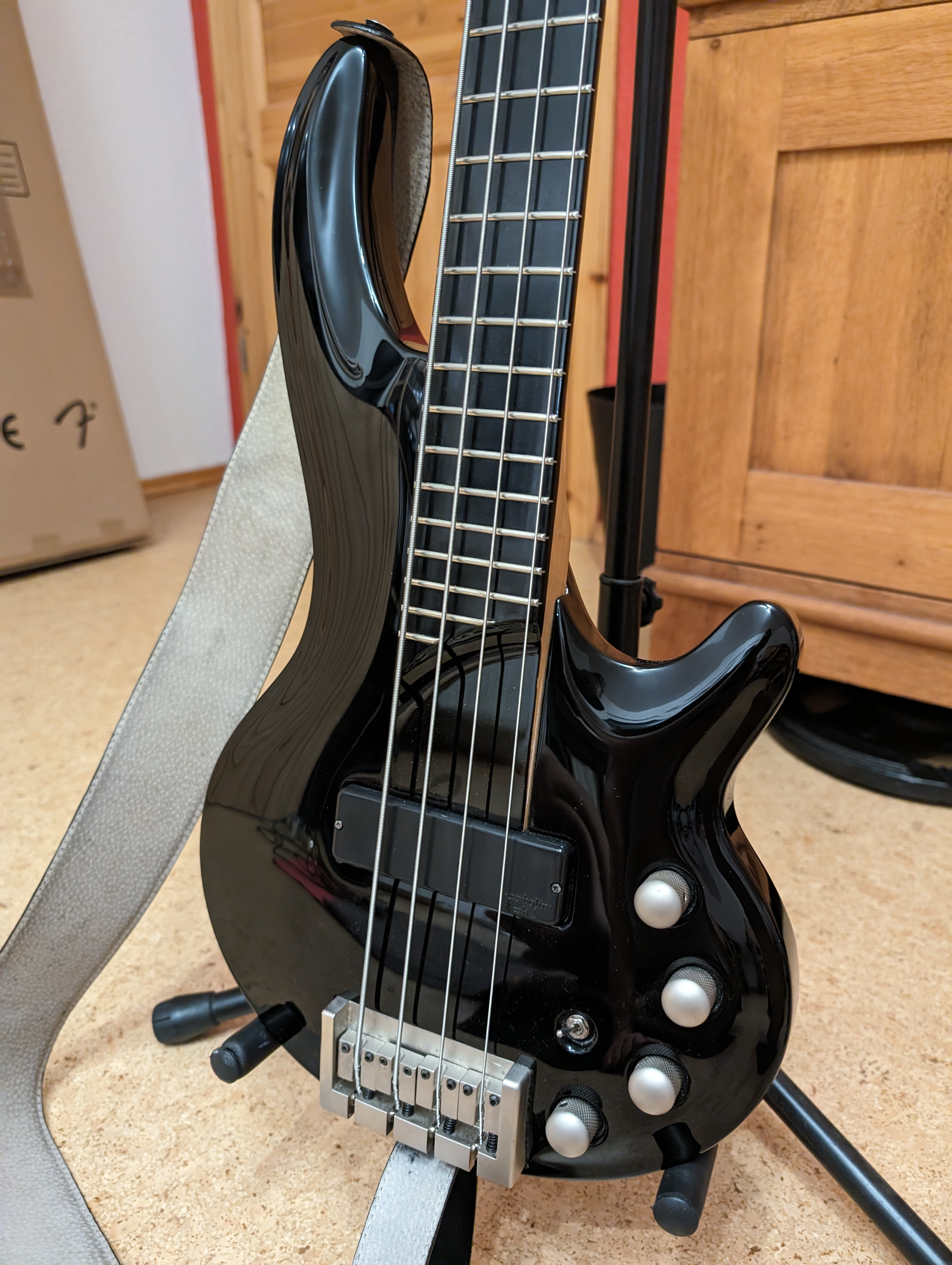
Body of a Cort Curbow bass guitar from Luthite

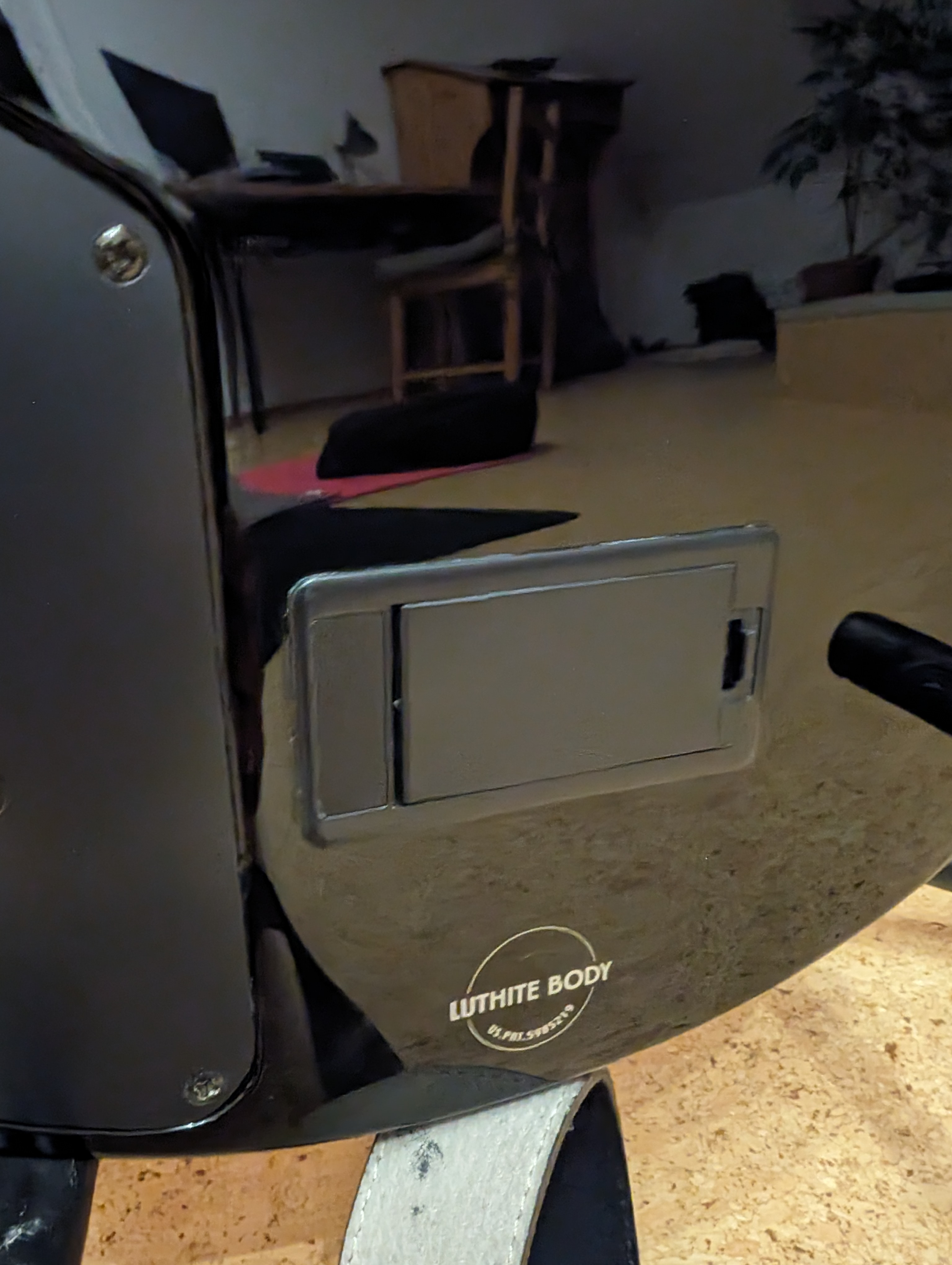
Luthite sticker on bass guitar body

Luthite is a lightweight synthetic material developed by the Westheimer Corporation (a United States-based importer of Cort Guitars) for the construction of bass guitar and electric guitar bodies. The term refers both to the composite material and to its forming process.
