= List of Ibanez players =

This is an alphabetized list by surname of musicians who have made notable use of Ibanez guitars.

== A-E ==
- Tosin Abasi (born 1983) guitarist who formed the instrumental progressive metal band Animals as Leaders, has had a signature guitar created for him by Ibanez that's branded as the Tosin Abasi Ibanez guitar.
- Joey Allen (born 1964) is the guitarist from Warrant, along with Erik Turner. He used various custom RG models during the Cherry Pie era.
- Tom Angelripper (born 1963) bassist for Sodom used an Ibanez Destroyer Bass
- Reginald Arvizu, also known as "Fieldy", (born 1969) plays a signature Ibanez model, the K-5, for Grammy Winning nu-metal band, Korn.
- Jennifer Batten (born 1957) former guitarist for Michael Jackson and Jeff Beck, was an Ibanez endorser in late 1980s. She had some custom models made for her which were different from any other Ibanez production models, and also sported Floyd Rose tremolos instead of the then newborn Edge.
- Reb Beach (born 1963) guitarist for Winger was an Ibanez endorser in early 1990s, he also had his own production model, the RBM Reb Beach Model.
- George Benson (born 1943) is a renowned jazz guitarist and Grammy Award winning Pop and R&B singer. Benson plays and endorses the signature Ibanez GB series guitar.
- Wes Borland (born 1975) guitarist for Limp Bizkit has owned many Ibanez guitars, including a custom 4-string baritone guitar, although he no longer endorses them. He was mainly noted for playing an Ibanez RG7 CST which had selectable piezo and magnetic pickups, only 18 of these were made in 1999. Borland has a signature Yamaha guitar, but has been seen playing a Jackson with the reformed Limp Bizkit.
- Jake Bowen (born 1983) is one of three guitarists from progressive metal band Periphery. He uses his signature 6/7-string models JBM100/JBM27 with signature DiMarzio Titan pickups, as well as a custom shop 8-string Ibanez RG.
- Coy Bowles (born 1979) is the guitarist for the Zac Brown Band. He has an electric signature model, the CBM100, and uses other Ibanez models.
- Chris Broderick (born 1970) was the lead guitarist for Megadeth from 2008 to 2014, also formerly of Jag Panzer and Nevermore. His main guitar was a 7-string RG model. During the recording of Endgame, he started using 6-string Ibanez S series guitars, which are painted with artwork from various Megadeth albums. This is because Dave Mustaine didn't want Broderick to use his 7-strings in the studio. He has since switched to Jackson Guitars.
- JB Brubaker (born 1984) of August Burns Red has a signature JBBM model.
- Stephen Bruner, also known as "Thundercat", (born 1984) was the bass guitarist for Suicidal Tendencies, and has worked with artists such as Snoop Dogg, Erykah Badu, Flying Lotus and Kamasi Washington (among others). He has released two full-length solo albums as well as an EP. He uses a custom 6-string Ibanez Artcore bass.
- Rob Buck (1958 - 2000) was an American musician and founding member for the alternative rock band 10,000 Maniacs. He played a Starfield America signature electric guitar, an AE40 acoustic guitar, both black and green sunburst and an AE20 nylon string guitar.
- Dino Cazares (born 1966) is the guitarist for Los Angeles-based industrial metal group Fear Factory, Divine Heresy and Asesino. He uses his signature DCM100 7-strings, custom made Xiphos 7-strings and RG-2228 8 strings for both studio and live performances.
- John Christ (born 1965) is a musician best known as the original guitarist for the metal band Danzig. He played Ibanez guitars during the 1990s.
- Greg Christian (born 1966), the bassist for thrash metal band Testament, was an Ibanez Road Bass endorser during the band's early career. He was pictured with a Road Bass in the Ibanez catalog for 5 consecutive years (1989 thru 1993). Christian is no longer an Ibanez endorser and now plays Music Man basses.
- Davide Civaschi (born 1962) guitarist for the Italian rock band Elio e le Storie Tese and long time Ibanez endorser. He was the first Italian guitarist to have a signature guitar built for him by Ibanez, the RGTH57 Cesareo Model.
- Adam Clayton (born 1960) bassist for the Irish rock band U2. He typically uses Ibanez or Fender basses.
- Phil Collen (born 1957) is the lead guitarist of the band Def Leppard. He played Ibanez Destroyer guitars before switching to Jackson.
- Brian Correll (born 1955), lead guitarist for Dennis Yost & The Classic IV, during the last 5 years of the band he used 2 early Ibanez 350Dx's.
- Sharlee D'Angelo (born 1973) is the bassist for the metal band Arch Enemy, as well as the classic rock/AOR band The Night Flight Orchestra, the stoner metal band Spiritual Beggars and the blackened thrash/speed metal band Witchery. D'Angelo has also been in various bands in the past, either as a studio session player or full member. These include Mercyful Fate, Dismember and King Diamond. He switched to Ibanez in 2005. Ibanez now produces the Sharlee D'Angelo signature basses, called the SDB2 and SDB3, which is tuned to D'Angelo's preferred C standard (Low to High – C, F, Bb, Eb).
- Mike D'Antonio (born 1973) is best known as the bass guitarist and founder of metal band Killswitch Engage and of the band Overcast. D'Antonio uses his signature Ibanez basses and an EBS bass rig.

== F-J ==
- Stéphan Forté (born 1978) is the lead guitarist and the main composer for the French progressive neo-classical metal band Adagio. He also releases albums as a solo artist. After playing Lâg Guitars for 12 years he switched to Ibanez in 2014. His signature model was presented at the 2015 NAMM Show built by LACS.
- Doyle Wolfgang Von Frankenstein (born 1964) is the former lead guitarist of the Misfits. He played an Ibanez Iceman during the Danzig era of the Misfits. He then began making his own guitars called Annihilators which he scaled off of the Iceman.
- Marty Friedman (born 1962) was the lead guitarist for pioneering American thrash metal band Megadeth. Friedman played a signature Ibanez MFM model.
- John Frusciante (born 1970) of the Red Hot Chili Peppers used the Ibanez RG250DX during the recording of their 1989 album Mother's Milk.
- Frank Gambale (born 1958) is an Australian jazz fusion guitarist renowned for his use of the sweep picking technique. Gambale had a signature range of Ibanez FGM series guitars, but has since left Ibanez and signed a deal with Yamaha.
- Jack Gardiner (born 1993) is a Swiss solo artist and session player from Liverpool, England.
- Rocky George (born 1964) is the former lead guitarist for the California-based hardcore punk/thrash metal outfit Suicidal Tendencies, and current lead guitarist for Fishbone. He played Ibanez RG series guitars.
- Paul Gilbert (born 1966) is the lead guitarist for heavy metal band Racer X and also the original guitar player for the hard rock band Mr. Big. Gilbert plays and endorses his Ibanez PGM model. Gilbert previously had the FRM signature models.
- Paul Gray (1972–2010) swapped his longtime association with Warwick basses for a customized version of the ATK bass series, the PGB1. He was impressed with the ATK bass after he bought one from a pawn shop and told Ibanez that he would endorse them if they put the ATK series back into production. He switched to his signature model shortly before recording of the Slipknot album All Hope Is Gone and used them until his death in 2010.
- James Hewitt (born 1991) is the lead guitarist for metal/rap band Hacktivist and formerly of Invocation and Exist Immortal. Hewitt is endorsed and plays RG 8 and 7 string models, Universe 7 string and a custom 8 string with a Floyd Rose tremolo.
- Allan Holdsworth (born 1946) was an Ibanez endorser from 1984 to 1987, when he switched to Steinberger. During the Ibanez period, Holdsworth had his own production model, the AH10 signature model.
- Dexter Holland (born 1965) is the rhythm guitarist of punk rock band The Offspring and has played Ibanez guitars for most of the band's existence. He currently uses a custom diamond plate RG with a custom Jägermeister logo on the twelfth fret, as well as DiMarzio Super Distortion pickups, though he used to use a brown and green custom RG and has been seen with a custom Purple RG.
- Gary Holt (born 1964) and Rick Hunolt (born 1963), both guitarists for thrash metal band Exodus, used Ibanez guitars during their early career. They were pictured with RGs in a 1993 Ibanez catalog.
- Tim Henson (born 1993) guitarist for instrumental progressive rock band Polyphia, used and owned Ibanez guitars mainly his entire career. He had 3 signature models which happened to be the TOD10, TOD10N and THBB10.
- Peter Iwers (born 1975) is the former bass player of the Swedish band In Flames. Ibanez has created a series of Peter Iwers signature basses which go by the designation of PIB and are tuned (low to high) B♭, C, F, B♭, E♭. The PIB1 was based on the Ibanez SR Prestige 5 which Iwers was using at the time.
- Bane Jelić (born 1967) is one of the most prominent rock and metal guitarists from Serbia, author of several solo instrumental albums, currently performing with Osvajači. He uses Ibanez RG2228-GK and RG1527-RB models.
- John 5 (born 1971), although a notable Fender Telecaster player, made use of the Ibanez AX Series and was an Ibanez Endorser during his time with Marilyn Manson.
- Alexander Julien (born 1988) guitarist for Canadian-American ambient rock band Vision Eternel uses Ibanez bass guitars on the band's recordings, specifically the Gio Soundgear GSR100BK and the BTB-775PB.

== K-P ==
- Eric Krasno (born 1977) is the guitarist for the bands Soulive, Lettuce, and Tedeschi Trucks Band. He is a member of Fyre Dept., where he has recorded or produced numerous artists. Krasno plays his signature EKM model guitars.
- Denny Laine (1944-2023) was the rhythm guitarist from the band Wings from 1971 to 1981. During the Wings Over the World tour and the live film Rockshow he used an Ibanez 2670 double neck.
- Larry LaLonde (born 1968) is the lead guitarist from the band Primus. During the Sailing the Seas of Cheese era, he used a custom Ibanez guitar (as seen in the video for "Jerry Was a Race Car Driver"), which he has either lost or had stolen from him. He now uses Fender Guitars.
- Herman Li (born 1976) is the lead guitarist of power metal band Dragonforce. He has used stock Ibanez S models, but currently uses his own signature line, Ibanez E-Gen.
- Kiko Loureiro (born 1972) of bands such as Angra and Megadeth uses the Ibanez Kiko100 from his signature line of guitars.
- Phil Lynott (1949–1986) of Thin Lizzy used an Ibanez Roadster RS900 bass guitar.
- Scott LePage guitarist for Polyphia used an Ibanez KRYS10 from his signature guitar line.
- Daron Malakian (born 1975) is the lead guitarist for System of a Down. During the System of a Down era, Daron played IC200's and IC300's on stage. During the Toxicity era, Malakian played a variation of the Ibanez Iceman ICX, with custom artwork designed by his father, then a special edition "DMM1" was released by Ibanez. The DMM1 featured more artwork by Malakian's father. After using Gibson guitars for 5 years, Daron switched back to Ibanez and began using an Iceman again.
- Claudio Marciello (born 1963) is the guitarist from the Argentine heavy metal band Almafuerte. His main guitar is a 1978 Ibanez CN-250.
- Meshuggah guitarists Fredrik Thordendal (born 1970) and Mårten Hagström (born 1971), from Sweden, are Ibanez endorsers, and were the first to use Ibanez 8-string models. They use their custom 8-string M8M and FTM33 signature models.
- Pat Metheny (born 1954) is an influential American jazz guitarist significant for his use of 12-string electric guitar and his use of digital signal processing. He plays an Ibanez PM120 signature series guitar.
- Chris Miller (born 1989) of the UK band You Me at Six uses his signature model, the CMM2.
- Steve Miller (born 1943) was one of the most prominent Ibanez users during the 1970s.
- Joni Mitchell (born 1943) played Ibanez George Benson Signature guitars from the mid-1970s through the 1980s.
- Vinnie Moore (born 1964) was one of the first Ibanez endorsers in the shredding era of the 1980s. He had his own signature production model, the VMM, though it was halted about one year later.
- Tom Morello (born 1964) has played several Ibanez guitars throughout his career. Perhaps some of his most notable ones being his Kenyan flag Ibanez Talman, which was custom-built for Tom by Ibanez, and it was allegedly modeled after a faulty guitar that made strange sounds from the pickups. Others are his custom two-tone Ibanez Artstar, which was custom-built for Morello and features built-in effects, and his “Whatever It Takes” Ibanez nylon, used as his main guitar for his solo project “The Nightwatchman”.
- Bob Mothersbaugh (born 1952) played a custom Ibanez "Spud" guitar with custom electronic effects on Devo's 1980 album Freedom of Choice and the subsequent tour. The guitar was lost in the early 1990s, but recovered, restored, and used on Devo's 2009 tour, and in music videos and TV appearances to promote their 2010 album Something for Everybody
- Bob Mould (born 1960) played an Ibanez Rocket Roll Snr (based on the 1958 Gibson Flying V) almost exclusively throughout the career of Hüsker Dü in the 1980s.
- James Murphy (born 1967), a metal guitarist best known for his work with notable bands such as Death, Obituary and Testament, has used Ibanez guitars almost exclusively throughout his career.
- Mike Mushok (born 1970) is the lead guitarist of the hard rock group Staind that has sold more than 15 million albums as of 2007. Mushok played an Ibanez MMM signature model. Mushok recently switched to using a signature baritone model made by PRS.
- Adam Nitti (born 1970) is a Grammy winning bassist, recording artist, and music educator. Nitti has performed with Kenny Loggins, Carrie Underwood, Michael McDonald, Al Green, Chris Tomlin, Casting Crowns, and the London Symphony Orchestra. He uses his signature ANB models, available in 4, 5, and 6-string varieties.
- Bradley Nowell (b. 1968 d. 1996) was the lead guitarist and singer for the band Sublime and played an Ibanez S470 until his death in 1996.
- Andy Partridge (born 1953) is a singer, songwriter, guitarist and founder of XTC and their psychedelic offshoot, The Dukes of Stratosphear. Since the band's first album in 1977, he has played a 1975 Ibanez Artist, featured on every album and almost every song, including "My Brown Guitar" (which appears on the band's last album, Wasp Star (Apple Venus Volume 2)).
- Joe Pass (1929 - 1994) notable jazz guitarist. Joe became an Ibanez endorser in 1980, and his signature JP20 model was produced from 1981 until 1990.
- John Petrucci (born 1967) is the guitarist of the American progressive metal band Dream Theater. From the beginning of the band's career in 1985 until 2000, he used his Ibanez signature model, the JPM100, as well as a 7-string Universe.

== Q-Z ==
- Lee Ritenour (born 1952) Grammy Award-winning Jazz Guitarist, Had his own Ibanez LR10 model from 1982 to 1986.
- Omar Rodríguez-López (born 1975) is the guitarist and composer for the progressive-rock band The Mars Volta. He uses a custom ORM1 Ibanez guitar.

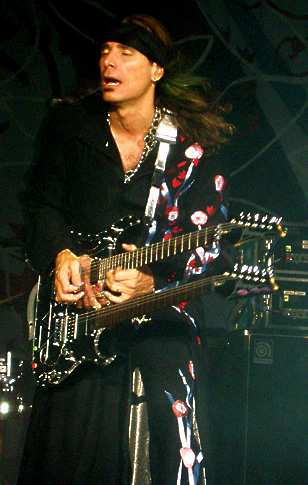
Steve Vai playing a double neck JEM series.

- Nene Royal (born 2010) is a Thai rock musician, singer, and winner of America's Got Talent season 21 in 2026. She uses an Ibanez Musician Series MC300 1978 model guitar.
- Joe Satriani (born 1956) is a renowned rock guitarist, collaborating, recording and touring with artists such as Alice Cooper, Mick Jagger, Yngwie Malmsteen and Steve Vai. Satriani plays a signature series Ibanez JS Series electric guitar, and he has a signature acoustic line.
- John Scofield (born 1951) is an American jazz guitarist and composer, who has played and collaborated with Miles Davis, Joe Henderson, Charles Mingus, Joey DeFrancesco, Herbie Hancock, Pat Metheny, Bill Frisell, Pat Martino, Mavis Staples, Phil Lesh, Billy Cobham, Medeski Martin & Wood, George Duke, Jaco Pastorius, John Mayer, and many other artists. Scofield had played a 1981 Ibanez AS-200 as his main guitar for over 20 years.
- Marco Sfogli (born 1980) is a session player from Italy who has played with James LaBrie, Jordan Rudess, Matt Guillory, John Macaluso, and many others. Sfogli uses Ibanez Guitars exclusively, and in 2017 his signature model was released.
- James "Munky" Shaffer (born 1970) is the lead guitarist of the Grammy Award winning nu metal group Korn and plays Ibanez K7 and Apex models, both specially designed signature seven-string electric guitars.
- Sami Yli-Sirniö (born 1972), lead guitarist of Kreator has endorsed Ibanez for a long time. He has been given an L.A. Custom Shop model.
- Alex Skolnick (born 1968), guitarist for Testament, was an Ibanez endorser in early 1990s. He still plays Ibanez, though he does not endorse them anymore. He now plays ESP Guitars.
- Paul Stanley (born 1952) is a rock guitarist from the band Kiss Stanley plays signature Ibanez PS guitars, which are similar to an Ibanez Iceman.
- Cat Stevens (born 1948) is a British singer-songwriter and musician best known for his hits, such as "Moonshadow", "Peace Train", "Wild World" and "Father and Son". He plays an AEL2012E 12-string acoustic guitar.
- Meic Stevens (born 1942) Welsh-language folk singer and guitarist, played a rare Ibanez AE 1000 VV (vintage violin) acoustic guitar at several music festivals. This guitar also features on the cover of the "An Evening with Meic Stevens" CD (2007, Sunbeam Records, SBRCD5033), recorded live at the Halfmoon, Putney, London in 2007.
- Sting used several, mainly fretless, basses of Ibanez in The Police and the beginning of his solo career.
- Nita Strauss (born 1986), guitarist for Alice Cooper, first female artist to get an Ibanez signature model, called the "Jiva"
- Muhammed Suiçmez of Necrophagist used many 6- and 7-string Ibanez Xiphos guitars both in studio and live performances. For some time it was even considered as his unofficial Signature model.
- Dave Swift (born 1964) is a British bassist best known for his work on the BBC2 Television program Later... with Jools Holland as part of Jool's Rhythm and Blues Orchestra. Swift has played for an array of renowned artists, from George Benson and Chaka Khan to Eric Clapton and Paul Simon. He uses Ibanez SR and BTB basses.
- Mick Thomson (born 1973) is the lead guitarist of the 9-member band Slipknot. He mainly plays 2 custom Ibanez MTM1 guitars (one red, tuned B-F#-B-E-G#-C#, and one white, tuned A-E-A-D-F#-B). His Ibanez guitars have "SEVEN" inscribed on the fretboard.
- Andy Timmons (born 1963) is an American guitarist who has played in the bands Danger Danger, Pawn Kings, and Andy Timmons Band (ATB). He plays his Ibanez AT300AV Signature model.
- Sam Totman (born 1979) is a British guitarist from DragonForce. He uses the Ibanez Iceman, and has his own signature line, the STM.
- Erik Turner (born 1964) is a guitarist from Warrant, along with Joey Allen (born 1964). He used various custom RG models during the Cherry Pie era.
- Steve Vai (born 1960) is Grammy Award winning guitarist and composer recording with artists and groups such as Frank Zappa, David Lee Roth, Whitesnake and Meat Loaf. Vai designed the Ibanez Universe and JEM electric guitars, and has a series of acoustic guitars.
- Eddie Van Halen (1955–2020), guitarist and founder of the American hard rock band Van Halen, used a 1975 Korina Ibanez Destroyer for the recording of its first album Van Halen, which also features on the cover of their third album, Women and Children First.
- Gerald Veasley (born 1955) is an American jazz bass guitarist. He uses his signature GVB36 model.
- Paul Waggoner (born 1979) is the guitarist of the bands Between The Buried And Me, Prayer for Cleansing, and Lamb of God. He has a signature line, the PWM series.
- Tom G. Warrior (born 1963), guitarist and vocalist for the influential extreme metal band Celtic Frost, plays the Iceman model and is seen playing the H.R. Giger signature Iceman model.
- Kevin 'Noodles' Wasserman (born 1963) is the lead guitarist for American punk rock group The Offspring and plays his Ibanez signature NDM series guitar.
- Bob Weir (1947-2026) was a founding member of the Grateful Dead and began playing Ibanez guitars in the mid-1970s during the recording of Blues for Allah. He played a custom Ibanez 2681 until the mid-1980s, when he switched to Modulus Guitars.
- Brian "Head" Welch (born 1970) plays Ibanez seven string guitars throughout his career with Korn and plays his signature Ibanez K7 and KOMRAD 7-string guitars. He used custom Ibanez 6-string baritone guitars on his solo project.
- Mark White (born 1962) bass player of the Spin Doctors plays an Ibanez ATK rainbow-colored bass.
- Verdine White (born 1953) bassist with Earth, Wind, & Fire played an Ibanez VWB-1 signature bass.
- Gary Willis (born 1957) is an American bassist and composer as the co-founder of the jazz fusion band Tribal Tech. He uses his GWB signature line.
- Jay Noel Yuenger (born 1966) from White Zombie, used ICJ100WZ – Yuenger's signature guitar, was in production in 1996–1999.
