= Ibanez S =

Guitar series

Ibanez S series
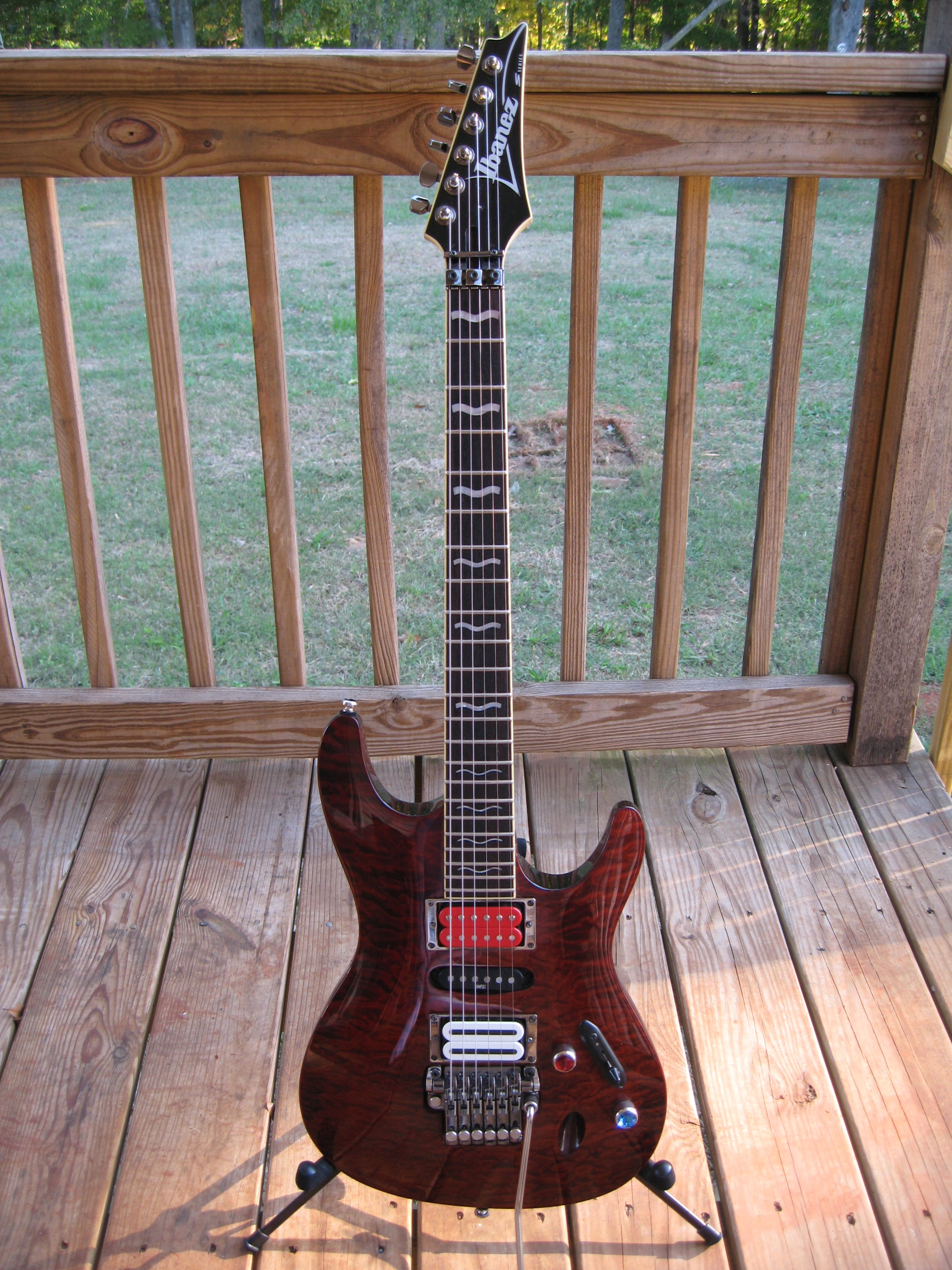
- 2005 S470
- Manufacturer: Ibanez
- Period: 1987 — present

Construction
- Body type: Solid
- Neck joint: Bolt-on, Set-in

Woods
- Body: Mahogany with Poplar, Maple, or Bubinga top (except for cheaper standard, non-GIO versions, which just have mahogany)
- Neck: 3pc and 5pc Wizard II Maple with Bubinga
- Fretboard: Rosewood; 22 fret (1987-2007); 24-fret (2008-)

Hardware
- Bridge: S: Lo-TRS Floyd Rose Licensed(1987-2003); Ibanez ZR locking Tremolo (2003-2007); Ibanez ZR-II locking tremolo (2008); SZ: Hardtail with tune-o-matic; SA: SAT Floating tremolo; SV: synchroniZR Floating tremolo
- Pickup(s): H-S-H, H-S-S (SA only), or H-H IBZ Infinity pickups; Ibanez AH pickups

The Ibanez S Series (also known as the Ibanez Saber Series) is a guitar series produced by Hoshino Gakki. Introduced in the late 1980s, the S Series is notable for being a streamlined mahogany-bodied guitar with a maple neck that plays comfortably while retaining the resonance of mahogany. Like the RG series, it also has prestige models, as well as derivatives, namely the SZ, SV, and SA series.

== History ==
The Ibanez Saber (S) series was introduced for the 1987 model year, around the same time as the Ibanez RG. At the time it was introduced, it was known for its sleek, contoured mahogany body as well as its Wizard profile maple neck, the slimmest on the market at the time. These first models used an "HSS" pickup configuration with an IBZ/USA humbucker at the bridge and two IBZ/USA hum-canceling single coils in the neck and middle positions or "HH" with humbuckers at both neck and bridge slots. Originally the pickups were selected via individual mini switches, but at some point in the 1988 model year Ibanez replaced them with a 5-way blade switch. Like many Ibanez guitars of this era, the Sabers were equipped with a double locking Edge tremolo system, licensed under Floyd Rose patents. At the time there were two production lines for the S model: one at the Fujigen plant in Japan and one in the US at Bensalem, Pennsylvania which assembled the guitars from parts made in Japan. In the USA S models, they installed a counter-tension system called the Backstop in the springs cavity, a device that helped keep the guitar in tune after a string-break and helped return the bridge to zero point, although the action of the tremolo was stiffer. The Backstop was halted in 1988 as players preferred a more free and smooth tremolo feeling.

== Current models ==
=== S series ===
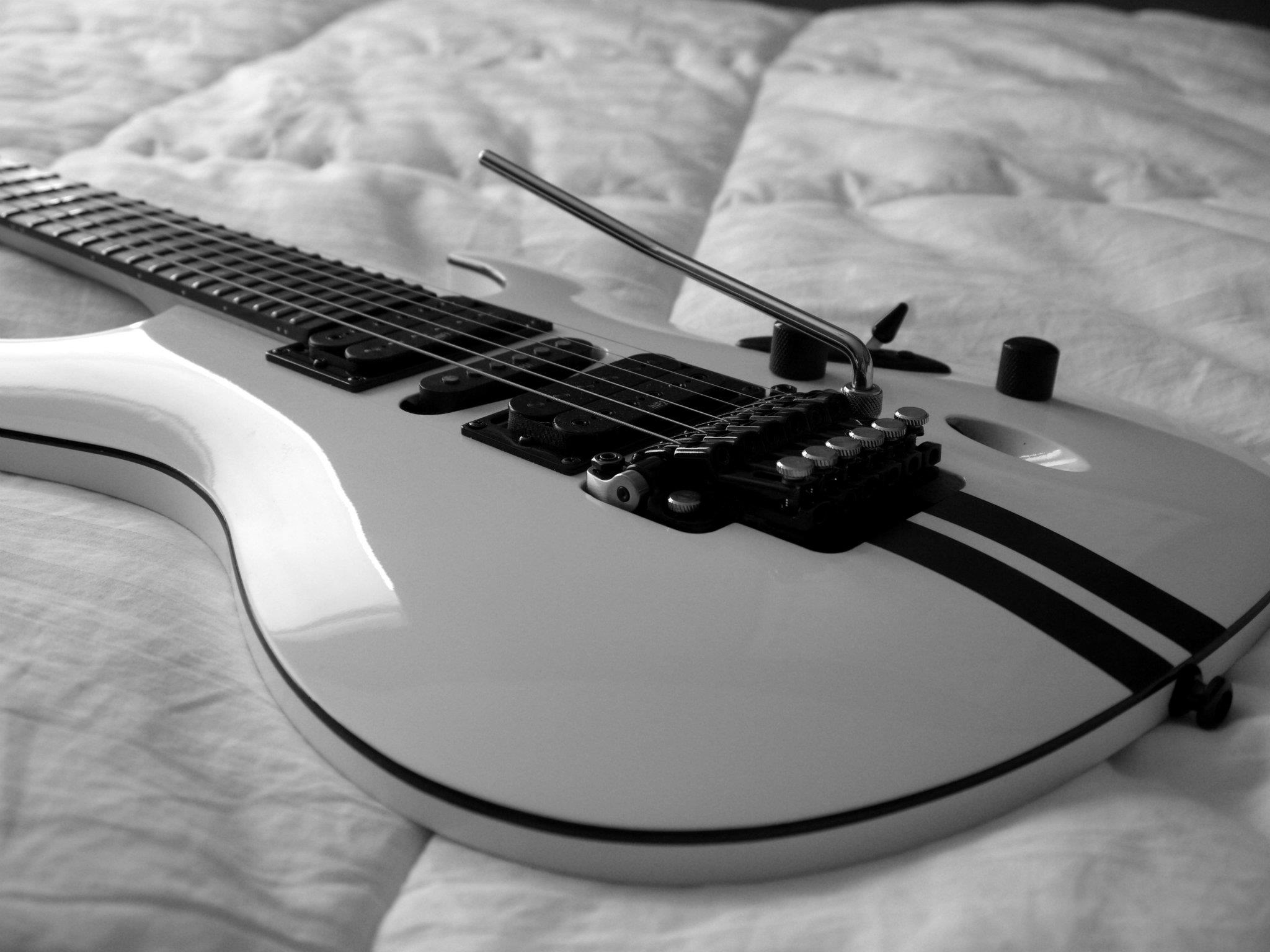
Ibanez S570B

The S series is the original Saber shape, with carved back and top. Originally, they were equipped with Edge and Lo-TRS series double locking tremolos, depending on the model. The S series uses a Zero-Resistance (ZR) double locking tremolo system from 2003 until 2014. The ZR tremolo system uses ball-bearings as opposed to knife edges for pivot points and a built-in counter-tension system called the Zero Point System. The Zero Point System can be removed to change the tremolo to full-floating operation.

The current line (2014) uses mainly Edge Zero ii systems, which are knife edge based.

==== Prestige series ====
The S-Prestige is the high end, "premium" S series. Between 2005 and 2008, S Prestige guitars were made in Korea. In 2009, production was moved back to Japan.

=== S 7 string series ===
Ibanez re-introduced the Ibanez S 7 string due to popular demand in 2007. A similar model had been discontinued and 7 string models were left to the RG series and some signature guitars. The first in the series, the S7320 sported all the same basic features as the non-Prestige models of the S Series (22 frets, Wizard-II neck, thin contoured mahogany body, ZR tremolo, jumbo frets) but had a different pickup configuration consisting of 2 Ibanez Axis Humbuckers, the AH1 and AH2, no middle pickup, but a 5 way selector giving the user the choice of Bridge, Bridge and neck split coils in parallel, Bridge and Neck humbuckers in parallel, Neck in parallel, and Neck, giving a wide array of tonal variations. In 2010, they replaced it with the S7420, which is similar except for the addition of a 24 fret fingerboard.

=== SZ series ===
The Ibanez SZ series is a derivative model of the S series. Guitars of this series feature a thicker and heavier body than the normal S series, hardtail bridges, maple tops (on most models) and a shorter 25.1" set-in neck. Unlike the S or SA, it has a 3-way selector switch, at which the mid position is two single-coil (inner coils of the humbuckers) instead.

=== SZR series ===
The Ibanez SZR series is a series introduced in 2008 to replace the SZ. Like the SZ, it has a thicker and heavier body and an even shorter 24.75" set-in neck, similar to Gibson guitars. Otherwise, it is identical to the SZ, with 2 tone knobs and a 3-way selector switch, at which the mid position is both humbuckers in split coil mode using the inner coils. The SZR series was discontinued in 2010.

=== SA series ===
The SA series is a different variant of the S series. Its S-based body has a flat back and an arched top, as opposed to the carved top and back of the normal S series. It also utilizes the SAT single-locking floating tremolo that only locks at the bridge, as opposed to the ZR and Edge tremolos, with which normal S series guitars are equipped. Prior to the 2008 model year, the SA series was Ibanez' only standard (non-budget) range of solid-body guitar that used a non-locking vibrato system.

=== SV series ===
The SV series sports a 24-fret neck, along with the SynchroniZR tremolo system, a non-locking variant of the double-locking ZR tremolo that utilizes locking tuners and a graphite nut. It also comes with a True-Duo coil tap system that Ibanez claims to give the guitar a more accurate tonal quality of a traditional S-S-S guitar.

All three have their own Prestige model. The SA and SZ also have the budget Ibanez GIO models.
