= Ibanez GIO =

Affordable guitar series

Ibanez GIO series
- Manufacturer: Ibanez
- Period: 1997 — present

Construction
- Body type: Solid
- Neck joint: Bolt-on

Woods
- Body: Basswood; Agathis; Mahogany
- Neck: style is copy of the standard series; maple
- Fretboard: Rosewood

Hardware
- Bridge: Floating tremolo, Hardtail
- Pickup(s): H-S-S, H-S-H or H-H pickup

The Ibanez GIO Series is an affordable guitar series produced by Hoshino Gakki (Ibanez), replacing the Cimar line. The GIO line is intended as beginner models, similar to Fender's Squier guitars, and Gibson's Epiphone line. This series of guitars are produced in either China or Indonesia, depending on model.

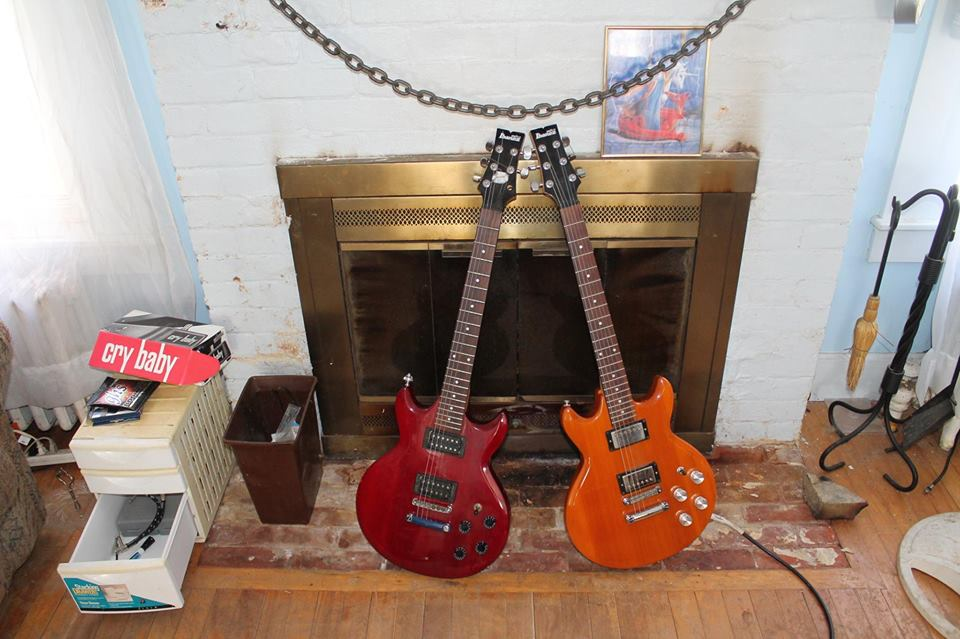
Ibanez Gio GAX-70 guitars in Trans Red and Butterscotch finishes

== Subseries ==
GAX series
The budget version of the AX series. This guitar's neck is based on the 22 fret AX profile, and the guitar is fitted with a hard-tail bridge and a dual humbucker (H-H) pickup configuration. The GAX75GP comes with a Shortstop bridge and "downshifter" to allow for quick drop-D tuning.
GSA series
The budget version of the SA series. This guitar uses a variety of configurations including a SAT-10 bridge, instead of the SAT-Pro bridge on the SA models, and the body wood is Agathis. This model's neck is based on the 22 fret SA neck profile. Hardware configurations include a dual humbucker and single coil pickup (H-S-H) combined with a full locking system, a dual single-coil and humbucker (S-S-H) with a standard floating bridge, and a dual humbucker setup (H-H) with a standard floating bridge.
GSZ series
The budget version of the Ibanez SZ series. This guitar uses a Full Tune II bridge instead of the Gibraltar III, and also comes with a Quik Change III tailpiece for easy and quick string changes; these are mounted on top of the body using a wrappiece instead of thru-body stringing. These models use a neck profile based on a 22 fret SZ profile, but use bolt-on construction rather than set-neck.
GRGA series
GRGA series is the GIO version of the Ibanez RGA model. GRGA line features mahogany body, maple neck and Edge III bridge for the tremolo models.
GRG series
Not including the GRGM, these are the budget versions of the Ibanez RG series. The DX version uses a Fat 10 single-locking floating tremolo bridge instead of a double locking tremolo system. The body is constructed of basswood, although of a lower grade than that found in Ibanez' higher ranges. The neck profile is based on the 24 fret RG-series neck, and comes with shark-tooth inlay. The non-DX model is fitted with a standard Ibanez floating bridge and dot inlays. It also has the coil configuration similar to the RG series that is the H-S-H coil configuration, but the pickups are different. The RG series guitars use pickups like DiMarzio Air Norton, Blue Velvet, or Tone Zone; or EMG 81, 85, 60, 707, or 808, while the Gio series use Ibanez Infinity R(H) for neck humbucker, Ibanez Infinity RS(S) for middle single coil, and Ibanez Infinity R(H) for bridge humbucker.
GRX series
The budget version of the Ibanez RX series (similar in design to the RG, and with a similarly thin neck, but 22 frets rather than 24). The neck profile is based on the 22 fret RX-series neck. There are a number of configurations for this model including the use of pick-guards, humbuckers and single coil pickups. Models range from no pick-guard and two humbuckers (H-H) to a super-strat design with pick-guard, two single coils and a humbucker (S-S-H). One example of a model in the series is the GRX40.
GRGM series
Also known as miKro RG series, this model is a smaller scale guitar designed for smaller hands, with a 22 inch, 24-fret neck, based upon the RG neck. These models use a fixed through-body bridge. While normally provided with 2 pickups, a model was made available which replaced the neck pickup with an onboard 2.5 watt amplifier.
