= Ibanez SZ =

Series of electric guitars by Ibanez

Ibanez SZ series
- Manufacturer: Ibanez
- Period: 2003 — 2013

Construction
- Body type: Solid
- Neck joint: Set-in & Neck-through for SZ4020FM only

Woods
- Body: Mahogany with Poplar, Maple, or Bubinga top (except for cheaper standard, non-GIO versions)
- Neck: SZ neck with Bubinga
- Fretboard: 22 fret Rosewood

Hardware
- Bridge: Hardtail or string-thru-body with Gibraltar III bridge
- Pickup(s): H-H Duncan/Ibanez; Seymour Duncan/IBZ on prestige series; EMG 81/85 on SZ2020EX

The Ibanez SZ is a modern 6-string electric guitar made by Ibanez, and is an offshoot of the Ibanez S family. Like the S, the SZ features a mahogany body. The SZ has a 25.1" scale. All SZ are hardtail. One of the best known SZ players is former Megadeth guitarist Marty Friedman.

Unlike other guitars in the S, SA, and SV line, SZ have only 3 way switch for its H-H configurations, while each pickup features an individual volume knob. There's also one main tone knob.

As of 2007, Ibanez offers the SZ in 8 various setups:

- SZ4020FM
- SZ1220
- SZ4020FM
- SZ2020EX
- SZ520FM
- SZ520QM
- SZ320MH
- SZ320EX

and the low end budget model, the GSZ120, aimed at beginner/younger/lower budget guitarists. SZ4020 was available in CKF (Charcoal Black Flat) and NTF (Natural Flat). The SZ2020ex was only available in BK (Black) and the SZ1220 was only available in TKF (Transparent Black Flat). The SZ720FM was available in DAS (Dark Amber Sunburst) and TG (Transparent Grey). The SZ520QM was available in BBL (Bright Blue), GAB (Gold Amber Sunburst), TKS (Transparent Black Sunburst) and various other colours. The SZ520QM was available in BK (Black), GD (Gold) and BS (Brown Sunburst).

The SZ series was phased out in 2008 for its successor, the SZR.
