= Ibanez Iceman =

Series of Ibanez electric guitars

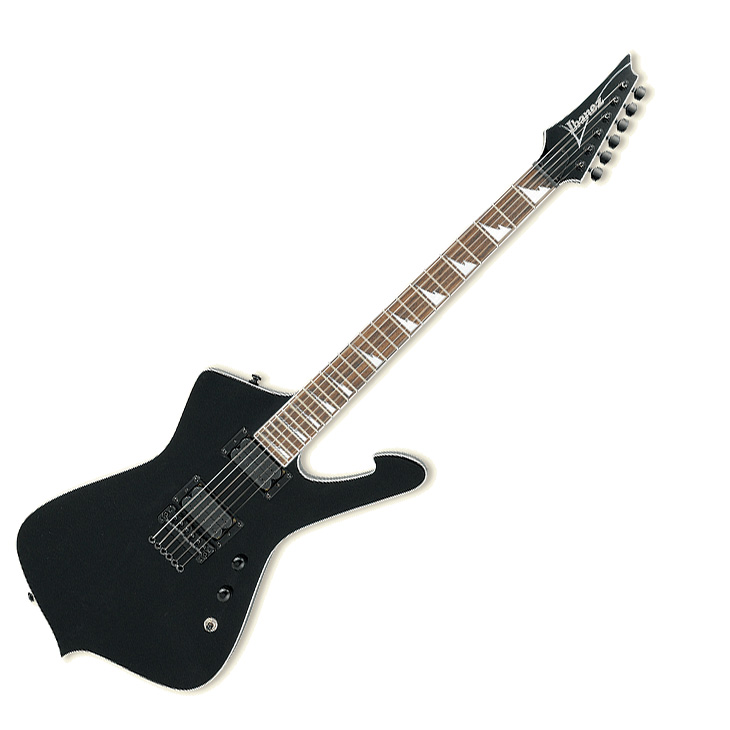
- Iceman ICT700 guitar, a 2008 model
- Manufacturer: Ibanez
- Period: 1975 — present

Construction
- Body type: Solid
- Neck joint: Bolt-on, Neck-thru, Set-in neck

The Ibanez Iceman is a guitar produced by Hoshino Gakki under the Ibanez brand.

== Background ==
Hoshino Gakki exported copies of American electric and acoustic guitars in the 1950s, and by the mid-1970s the Ibanez guitars had reached a level of quality comparable to American guitars. Lower labor rates at the time, plus efficient manufacturing meant that Ibanez guitars could be sold for almost half (or less) of the cost of a Gibson Les Paul or Fender Stratocaster.

In the mid-1970s Hoshino Gakki wanted to make a distinctly Japanese guitar and to start breaking away from the Ibanez replicas of Fender and Gibson models. The idea was to build a guitar with an appealing original design, like a Les Paul or Stratocaster. A meeting between Hoshino (Ibanez), Kanda Shokai (Greco) and one of the main guitar factories in Japan (FujiGen) resulted in the Iceman/Mirage design. Each distribution company had distribution rights to it in different global markets. Hoshino Gakki (Ibanez) had the rights outside of Japan and Kanda Shokai (Greco) had the rights for Japan.

The early Ibanez models were originally named the Artist 2663 models, launched in 1975. The name "Iceman" came later in 1978. The Greco model was named the Mirage and they are basically the same except for the pickup types that were used. Super 2000, Triple Coil and V2 pickups were used for the Ibanez Iceman, depending on the model number. Greco Dry and DiMarzio Super II pickups were used for the Greco Mirage. Body wood, pickups and neck joint construction varied with the Iceman/Mirage model price. The original Ibanez Artist/Iceman production was from 1975 to 1982/1983 with different models having set neck and bolt-on necks.

The Ibanez Iceman II that was released in 1982/1983 had a different headstock with 6 in line tuners instead of the 3 a side tuners the original Ibanez Iceman had.

== Use and signature models by Paul Stanley ==
Paul Stanley of KISS favored the Iceman from 1977 to 1980 and again used it primarily from 1992 to 1997 until he started endorsing his own model by Washburn guitars, but in 2016 he returned to Ibanez.

Probably the most sought after by collectors is the PS-10, or Paul Stanley model. This came out in 1977 as the popularity of the rock band Kiss skyrocketed. Ibanez approached Stanley while Kiss was on tour in Japan in March 1977. They offered him a chance to develop his own signature model. He liked the shape of the Artist 2663 model and made changes to that model as his ideas came to fruition in the PS10 model. The PS10 first appeared in the 1978 Ibanez catalog, although it may have been available for purchase prior to catalog printing. Stanley played an Iceman for the next 4 years. A photo of him performing with the Iceman appears inside the album cover of Kiss Alive II. This model retailed for about $695 in 1978, and was offered through 1981.

In 1995 the PS-10 was re-issued as the Korean-made PS10II. A deluxe version, the PS10LTD (or Limited) was also introduced in 1995. The PS10LTD was made in Japan and had gold hardware (which Stanley is said to have not liked) as well as an ebony fretboard and different pickups than the PS10II. In 1997 yet another PS was offered in the catalog - this was sold as the PS10-CL (or Classic). The biggest difference between them is that the PS10-II was made in Korean factories and the LTD and Classic were Japanese made and also had all the same features of the original 1978 model (like the Gibraltar bridge and Quick Change tailpiece). Although the catalog shows the PS10-II with "Paul Stanley" inlaid at the 21 fret, most were not produced this way. Apparently there was a problem with the inserts at the Korean factory and it was decided not to use them.

== Variations ==
=== Ibanez ICJ100WZ ===
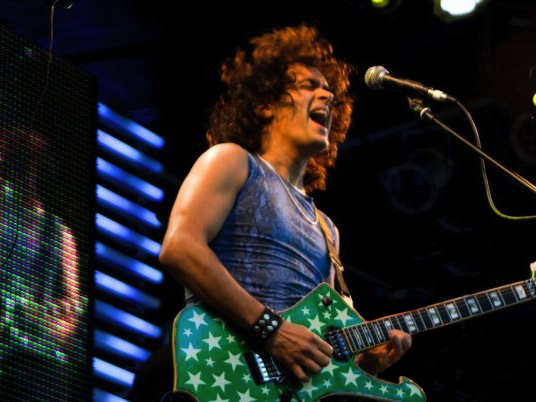
Argentinian guitar player Anel Paz playing ICJ100WZ

The Ibanez ICJ100WZ was an Iceman-shaped signature guitar for Jay Yuenger of White Zombie, introduced in 1996. It featured a mahogany body with maple top, painted in green with white stars all over the place, a set-in maple neck with bound ebony fingerboard. Hardware equipped on it was Lo Pro Edge tremolo, two humbucking pickups, 3 knob control and 3 way toggle with coil split.

=== Ibanez DMM1 ===
Daron Malakian of System of a Down favored the IC300 from the early days of System of a Down up to the Mezmerize/Hypnotize era (2004-2005), when he switched to using Gibson SGs, although he has been recently seen playing Iceman guitars again with System, making use of a custom-made model which is currently his main guitar. Daron had his own signature model, the Ibanez DMM1, released in 2004. It was a limited edition run based on the Ibanez Iceman ICX shape and features a special graphic design painted by Daron’s father, Vartan Malakian. Only 300 were made.

=== Ibanez STM ===
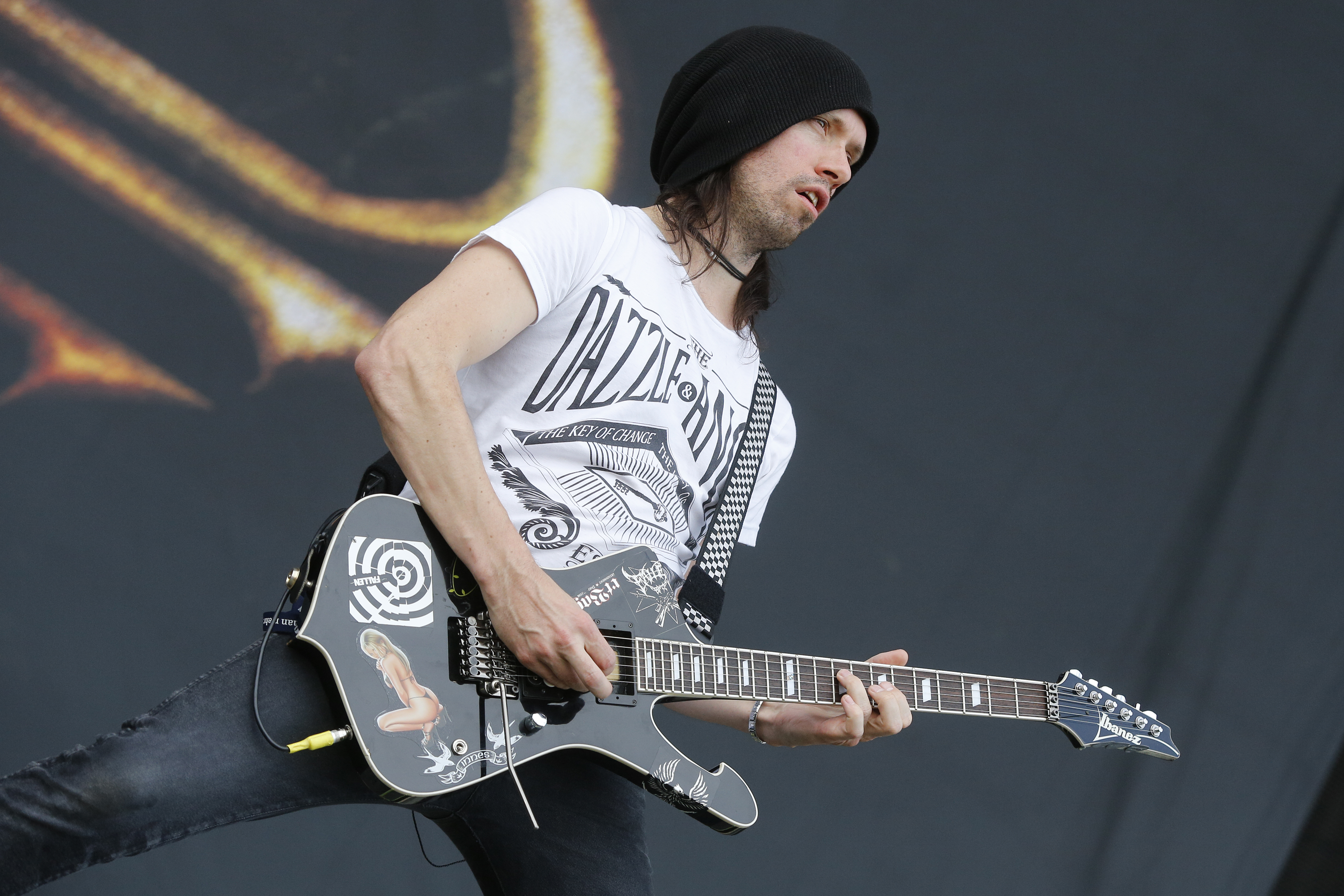
Sam Totman playing STM

The STM is a special version of Iceman designed for Sam Totman of DragonForce, released from 2008 to 2010. Essentially it is an Iceman with a 24-fret neck-through neck and Edge III tremolo instead of a hardtail bridge. This is the first production Iceman since the 1990s to have a whammy bar.

=== Ibanez Fireman ===
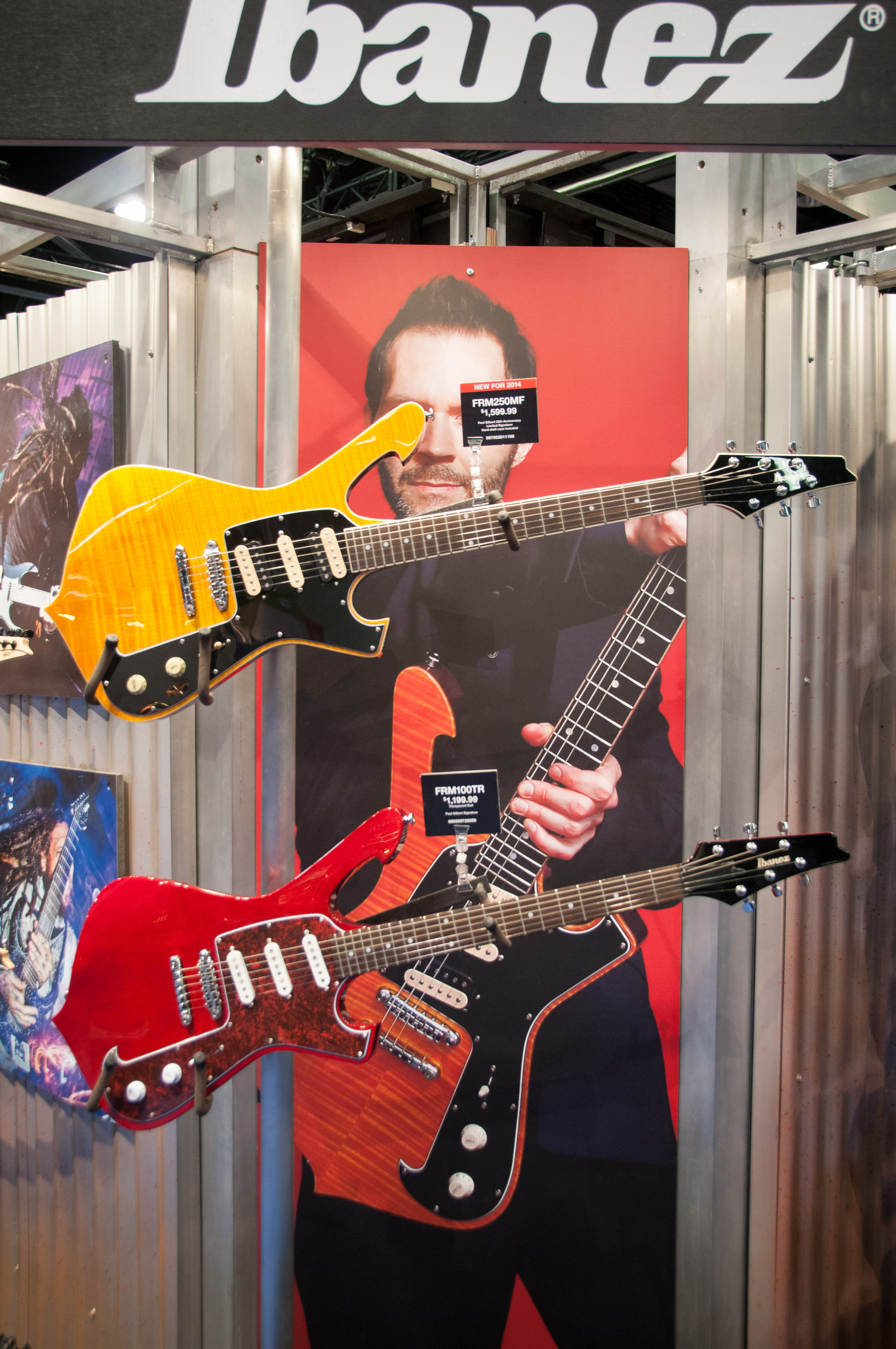
Fireman models from 2014 NAMM Show

In 2009, the Iceman was remodeled by Paul Gilbert using Photoshop, by flipping the body of the Iceman over. Since the cutout was on the other side, Gilbert added another cutout that was a bit smaller than the trademark Iceman stalk. There were two designs; both of a natural wood finish, one with mahogany with a cherry fret-board and another with korina wood.

Paul Gilbert's model was released at a 2009 Guitar show as the "Ibanez Fireman", with a set 3-piece korina/bubinga neck, 22 frets, and a 24-3/4" scale length. It also contained a fixed Gibraltar II bridge, (with a Quick Charge tailpeice) and Dimarzio Area 67 hum-cancelling single coil pickups. It comes with a hard Ibanez case, (authenticated by Paul Gilbert) and additional accessories, limited edition. Paul Gilbert also notes in interviews that a fan submitted the idea for the name: "At first, I called it the 'Reverse Iceman', but a fan wrote to me and suggested the 'Ibanez Fireman', and since fire is the opposite of ice, that’s what we ended up calling it."

=== Ibanez FTM33 Stoneman ===
This 8-string signature model for Meshuggah guitarist Fredrik Thordendal is essentially a hybrid design blending the Iceman body shape with a reverse Gibson Firebird, featuring an ash wing body, 7-piece maple/walnut neck-through construction with KTS™ TITANIUM reinforcement rods, 27" scale length, jatoba fretboard (as of 2018), 24 jumbo frets, FX Edge III-8 locking fixed bridge and a pair of Lundgren M8P ceramic humbucking pickups. Introduced in 2017, this guitar is available in Weathered Black.

== Specifications ==
(From Ibanez catalog)

Model	Year	Body	Neck	Fingerboard	PU	Control	Tuner	Bridge	Hardware	Color
Ibanez Iceman IC100	1978	Solid Mahogany	Laminated rock maple, detachable	Ebonized rosewood, pearloid dot inlays, 22 large frets	Super 80	2 Volume & 2 Tone, 3-position pickup selector	Velve-Tune II	Gibraltar & Quik-Change (r)	Chrome	Black (IC100BK) and white (IC100WH)
Ibanez Iceman IC200	1978	Solid Mahogany	Laminated rock maple (built-in)	Ebonized rosewood, pearloid parallelogram inlays, 22 VelveTouch frets, Half & Half nut	Super 80 (Flying Finger)	2 Volume & 2 Tone, 3-position pickup selector	Velve-Tune II	Gibraltar & Quik-Change (r)	Chrome	Brown Sunburst
Ibanez Iceman IC210	1978	Solid Mahogany	Laminated rock maple (built-in)	Ebonized rosewood, pearloid parallelogram inlays, 22 VelveTouch frets, Half & Half nut	Ibanez Special Design Triple Coil	Volume & Tone, rotary 4-position coil splitter	Velve-Tune II	Gibraltar & Quik-Change (r)	Chrome	Brown Sunburst
Greco Mirage M900	1978	Mahogany	3 piece Maple (Set Neck)	Rosewood	DiMarzio Super II	2 Volume & 2 Tone, 3 way switch	Greco MH-900C	Greco BR-GO & TP-GO	Chrome	
Ibanez Iceman IC300	1978	Solid Ash	Laminated rock maple (built-in)	Ebonized rosewood, pearloid dot inlays, 22 VelveTouch frets, Half & Half nut	Super 80	2 Volume & 2 Tone, 3-position pickup selector	Velve-Tune	Gibraltar (with inlaid sustain block) & Quik-Change (r)	Chrome	Korina, Also had optional cream colored pickguard (similar in shape to the one on the PS10), pickup rings, control cavity covers and truss rod cover.
Ibanez Iceman IC400	1978	Mahogany with maple top	Laminated rock maple (built-in) with smooth heel	Ebonized rosewood, pearloid parallelogram inlays, 22 VelveTouch frets, Half & Half nut	Super 80	2 Volume & 2 Tone, 3-position pickup selector	Velve-Tune	Gibraltar (with inlaid sustain block) & Quik-Change (r)	Gold-plated	Antique Violin & Midnight Olive
Ibanez Iceman IC500		Mahogany	Iceman 3pc Mahogany/Maple set-in neck	Bound rosewood fretboard w/Pearl block inlay, FRET: Medium frets	DiMarzio® D Activator™ (H) neck, DiMarzio® D Activator™ (H) bridge			Gibraltar Standard bridge	Black	
Ibanez Iceman ICT700		Mahogany wing body	5pc Wizard III Maple/Walnut neck-thru w/KTS™ TITANIUM Reinforcement, FRET: Jumbo frets		DiMarzio® D Activator™ (H) neck and DiMarzio® D Activator™ (H) bridge	1 volume, 1 tone, 3 way switch		Gibraltar custom bridge	Black	
Ibanez Iceman PS10 (Paul Stanley Model)	1978	Mahogany with solid maple top, black finish with deluxe binding	Maple (built-in) with smooth heel	Polished rosewood, pearl-abalone-pearl rectangular inlays, 22 VelveTouch frets, Half & Half nut	Special design Ibanez V-2 open coil	Individual Volume & Master Tone	Velve-Tune	Gibraltar (with sustain block) & modified Gibraltar slotted	Chrome (including pickguard and truss rod cover)	Black

== Serial numbers ==
The serial number format is MYYPPPP.

- M = production month (A=January B=February ... K=November L=December).
- YY = year (79=1979).
- PPPP = production number.

FujiGen Gakki used this format for the Ibanez guitars they made from the mid-1970s to 1987.

== See also ==
- List of Ibanez players
