= Ibanez RG2228 =

- Manufacturer: Ibanez
- Period: 2007–2016

Woods
- Body: Basswood
- Neck: Five-piece maple and wenge
- Fretboard: Rosewood

Hardware
- Bridge: Fixed Edge III-8, double-locking
- Pickup: EMG 808

Colors available
- Galaxy Black

The Ibanez RG2228 is the world's first mass-produced eight string electric guitar. It debuted in 2007 at the Winter NAMM Show. In 2025, Guitar World included the RG2228 in its list of the 50 greatest pieces of guitar gear of the century so far, crediting the guitar's popularity among tech metal guitarists with inspiring rival companies like ESP, Jackson, and Schecter to release their own extended-range models.

== Specifications ==
=== Basic Information ===
- Scale Length - 27" (Baritone Scale)
- Neck Length - 685.8 mm
- Neck Material - Five-piece maple and wenge
- Body Material - Basswood
- Fingerboard - Rosewood with dot inlays
- Frets - 24 Jumbo Frets
- Bridge - Fixed Edge III-8, double-locking

=== Pickups ===
Neck and Bridge Pickups:

- Name - EMG 808
- Type - Active Humbucker

=== Strings ===
String	8	7	6	5	4	3	2	1
Factory Tuning	F_{1}	A_{1}#	D_{2}#	G_{2}#	C_{3}#	F_{3}#	A_{3}#	D_{4}#
Standard Gauge	.065"	.054"	.042"	.032"	.024"	.016"	.011"	.009"

== Notable users ==
- Tosin Abasi - Animals as Leaders, until Ibanez created his own signature 8-string model.
- Dino Cazares - Fear Factory, Asesino and Divine Heresy
- Ihsahn - Emperor, Thou Shalt Suffer and Peccatum
- Tony MacAlpine - Tony Macalpine band
- Fredrik Thordendal and Mårten Hagström from the Swedish tech-metal band Meshuggah use custom Ibanez eight-strings of a similar aesthetic design to the RG2228.
- Scott Hull - Pig Destroyer, Agoraphobic Nosebleed, (formerly) Anal Cunt
- Justin Lowe and Trent Hafdahl - After the Burial
- Misha Mansoor - Periphery
- Timfy James - Hacktivist
- Josh Martin - Little Tybee
- Herman Li - DragonForce
