= Ibanez K7 =

Series of guitars

- Manufacturer: Ibanez
- Period: 2001-2006; 2025-present

Construction
- Body type: Solid
- Neck joint: AANJ Bolt-on neck

Woods
- Body: Mahogany
- Neck: Maple, Wenge, with Bubinga stripes
- Fretboard: Rosewood

Hardware
- Bridge: Ibanez Lo-Pro 7 with U-Bar
- Pickup: H-H: DiMarzio PAF7

Colors available
- Blade Gray and Firespeak Blue

The Ibanez K7 series is a signature series of seven-string guitars used by Korn guitarists James "Munky" Shaffer and Brian "Head" Welch. When Korn redefined heavy music in the late 1990s and early 2000s, Shaffer and Welch helped lead the charge with their aggressive, downtuned riffs. To support their groundbreaking style, they partnered with Ibanez to design a guitar that could meet their unique sonic demands. In 2001, that collaboration gave birth to the Ibanez K7, a custom-built seven-string guitar that became a cornerstone of the band’s identity and influenced an entire generation of metal guitarists.

== History ==
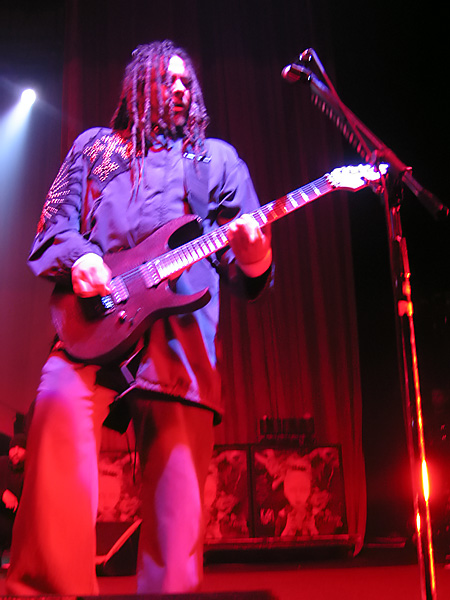
James Shaffer playing with his signature Ibanez K7 in 2006

In the early 2000s, as the nu-metal wave surged across the globe, Korn stood at the forefront of the movement—redefining what heavy music could sound like. Central to their sonic identity were the crushing, low-end riffs crafted by Shaffer and Welch, who pushed the limits of traditional guitar playing. To fully realize their musical vision, they needed an instrument that could handle lower tunings, aggressive playing, and experimental textures—something beyond what standard six-string guitars could offer.

Instead of adapting to what was already on the market, Munky and Head took matters into their own hands. They joined forces with Japanese guitar manufacturer Ibanez, a brand already known for its innovation and support of extended-range instruments. Together, they designed a guitar from the ground up that would not only meet their needs but also inspire a new generation of guitarists. In 2001, the result of that collaboration emerged: the Ibanez K7.

More than just a signature model, the K7 embodied Korn’s raw intensity and forward-thinking approach to music. With its seven-string configuration, custom features, and iconic design, the K7 didn’t just support Korn’s sound—it helped define it. The guitar quickly became a favorite among players who wanted to explore lower tunings, heavier tones, and new levels of expression. Today, the Ibanez K7 remains a landmark in the history of metal guitars, symbolizing a turning point where artist and manufacturer worked hand in hand to create something truly groundbreaking.

== Specifications ==
The K7 guitars were originally available in two finishes, Firespeak Blue (James "Munky" Shaffer's model), and Blade Gray (Brian "Head" Welch's model). They came factory tuned to KoRn signature tuning: A, D, G, C, F, A, D (low to high), and were retailed at USD 1,799. These guitars are characterized by the deep metallic sound, from the body being made of mahogany that is well suited for Korn's musical style. The last year of production on these particular models was 2006.

In 2007 Ibanez released new versions of Korn's signature series as the Apex. There are two models linked to Munky only, however K7s can still be seen played by Munky in live performances.

Although 7-string guitars were not used for recording his debut album Save Me from Myself, Welch had continued to use his original K7s as his exclusive signature guitar, even during his almost eight-year absence from Korn.
