= Ibanez RG =

Series of electric guitars produced by Hoshino Gakki

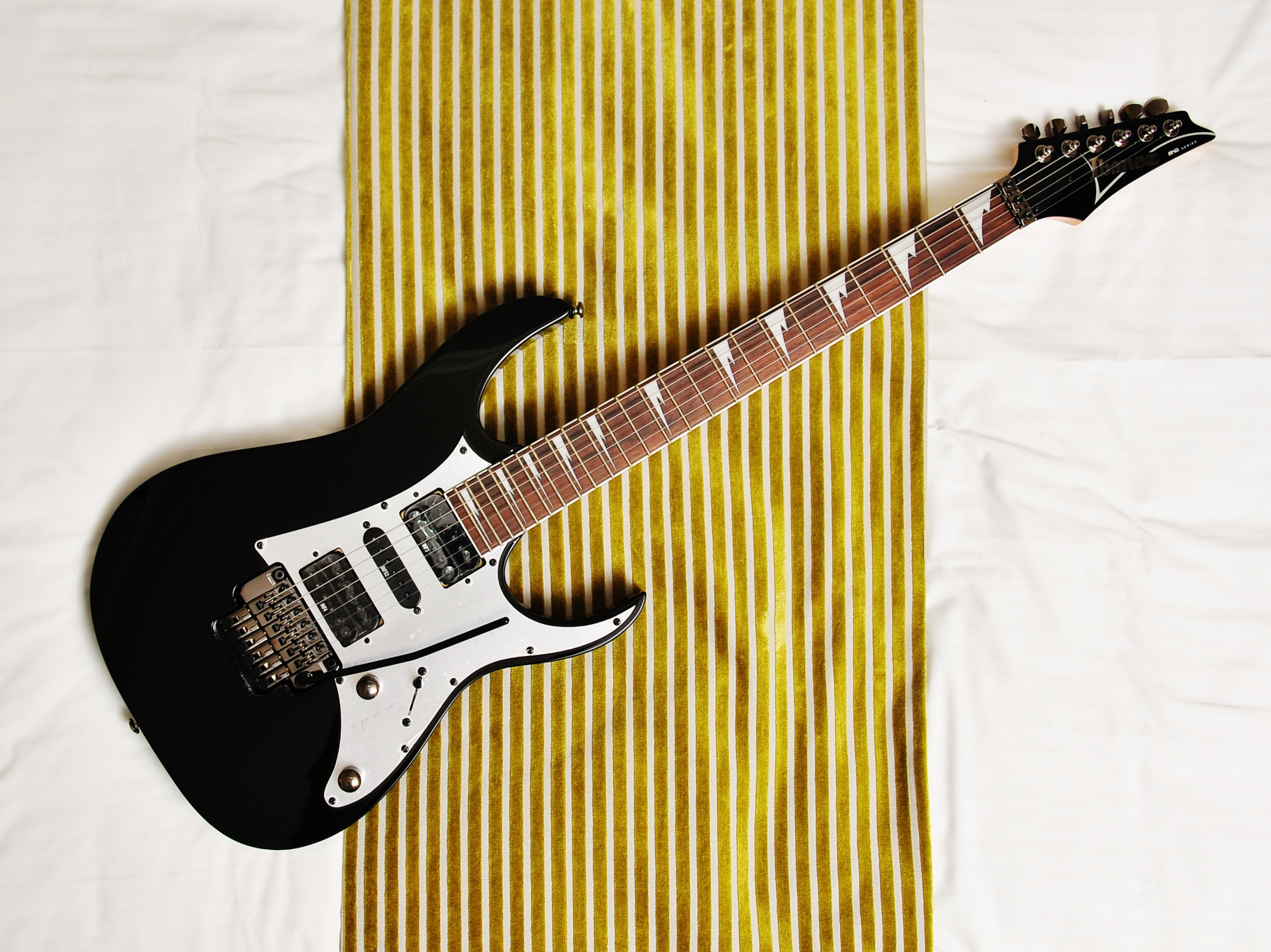
- Ibanez RG350EXZ, a 2011 model
- Manufacturer: Ibanez
- Period: 1987–present

Construction
- Body type: Solid
- Neck joint: Bolt-on, Neck-thru

Woods
- Body: Basswood, Mahogany, Mahogany with Maple cap
- Neck: 5pc Maple with Walnut, 3pc Maple with Walnut
- Fretboard: 24 fret Rosewood, Maple

Hardware
- Bridge: Edge, Edge Lo-Pro, Edge Zero, Edge III Tremolo, Fixed Bridge, Edge Pro Tremolo, Gibraltar Plus Bridge
- Pickup(s): H-S-H or H-H Infinity, DiMarzio IBZ, Air Norton, Blue Velvet, and Tone Zone, IBZ V7, V8 & S1, or EMG 81, 85, 60, 707, or 808 pickups

Colors available
- Black, Purple Neon, Electric Blue, White, Amber, Transparent Lavender Blue, Weathered Black, Metallic Khaki, Jewel Blue, Black Night, Regal Brown Burst, Stained Oil, Natural Flat, Dark Amber, Aged Natural, Cubed Black Pewter, Grey Nickel, Vital Silver, Galaxy Black, Mirage Blue, Mirage Red, Royal Blue, Black Pearl, Sapphire Blue & Violin Flat

The Ibanez RG is a series of electric guitars produced by Hoshino Gakki. The first model in the series, the RG550, was originally released in 1987 and advertised as part of the Roadstar series. That series was renamed "RG" in 1992 and all models since are simply known as RGs.

It rose in popularity throughout the 1980s and had the features that musicians in the rising shred and thrash metal movements of that time were looking for: a "fast" neck, comfortable body, powerful pickups, and a reliable tremolo system.

The RG series has the most subtypes of any Ibanez model and is the most popular series of Ibanez electric guitars produced by Hoshino Gakki. The RG's deep cutaway, flatter fingerboard and extended fret range (24 frets as standard) has made it one of the most popular guitars for rock and heavy metal music.

== Origin and name ==
The Ibanez RG was originally designed in 1987, the same year as Steve Vai's signature guitar, the Ibanez JEM. It was created as a successor to the company's previous Roadstar and Roadstar II series guitars produced from 1979 to 1986. The name is an abbreviation of "Roadstar Guitar".

== Features ==
=== Neck ===
The RG Series features a neck that is very thin in cross-section, with a fretboard that is flatter (430mm/16.9in or 400mm/15.75in radius of curvature), wider, and longer (24 fret double octave) than most. Flatter radius on a fretboards facilitate wider bends and lower string action at the expense of comfort in playing chords. For the virtuosic "shred" style of guitar playing or fast, aggressive thrash/speed metal rhythm, this type of neck is often preferred.

Necks are typically made from maple, while fretboards are usually made of maple, rosewood or jatoba.

=== Body ===
The body of the RG Series features sleek, offset pointed double cutaways giving better access to the upper frets. Typically the body is made of basswood, poplar, or mahogany, with some exception such as swamp ash (RGT220A) or alder (select J Custom RGs). Some models such as the RG550 came with a pickguard while others usually feature back-routed controls.

=== Hardware ===
RG pickups options include humbucker and single-coil models, with humbucker-single–single (HSS), humbucker–single-humbucker (HSH), or dual-humbucker (HH) configurations available. Options available include Seymour Duncan, DiMarzio, or EMG models in addition to Ibanez custom models.

All RGs of the 550 series and higher have the Ibanez Edge vibrato unit, either the original or low-profile version. The Edge tremolo incorporated several manufacturing changes when compared to the original Floyd Rose, including increased mass, relocated fine tuners and improved locking posts. The locking posts are no longer used as of the 2003 model year along with the introduction of the Edge Pro.

While most models of the RG series use variations of Ibanez Edge tremolo, there are fixed bridge models available, which are equipped with either a Hipshot-style bridge or a Gibraltar standard bridge. Fixed bridge versions of the Edge bridge are also available on a few select signature models.

=== Extra string models ===
Since the release of RG7620 and 7621 in 1998, RGs are famous for being the basis of particularly easy to play seven string guitars. Also, in 2007, Ibanez produced its first commercially available 8 string guitar, the RG2228. Ibanez introduced their first commercial nine-string models, the RG9QM and RG90BKP, for 2014.

== Model variations ==
In addition to "standard" RG Series, there are various sub-series of guitars available:

RGA
Arched top body shape. Introduced in 2005.
RGB
Bass version of the RG series, available in 4 (RGB300) and 5-string (RGB305) models. Features include a poplar body, Dynamix pickups, B10 fixed bridge, bound maple neck with 22 fret jatoba fingerboard, sharktooth inlays and a 2-band active EQ. Introduced in 2020, the RGB bass guitars are crafted in Indonesia. Available in Soda Blue Matte and Flat Black.
RGT
'Neck-through' models where the neck runs the entire length of the body, with the rest of the body glued to either side of this central core (other RG models typically have a bolt-on neck).
RGD
Longer 26½" scale length, optimized for down-tuning. Introduced in 2010.

RGV
RG guitars with traditional synchronized tremolos. Introduced in 2016.
RT
More "traditional" features and look, such as non-locking synchronized style bridge. Available only in 1992–1993.
RX
Same concept as RT, except these are 22 fret guitars. Introduced in 1994.

Additionally, current the RG series and related sub-series are split into following versions depending on quality:

J Custom line
Highest quality RG guitars produced in Japan by FujiGen or Sugi Guitars. Introduced in 1996. Most J Customs are offered exclusively in the Japanese domestic market, but a handful have been made available in other markets around the world.
Prestige line
High quality RG guitars which are made in Japan by FujiGen. The Prestige series was instituted in 1996. All Japanese-made RG models since 2003 are included in the Prestige line including those in the RGA and RGD series. Prior to 2003 many Japanese-made RGs were not designated as Prestige.
Premium line
Mid-tier guitars produced in a special facility set up in Indonesia. The Premium line started in 2010 and sits above the "standard" RGs and below the Prestige series. Some recent (as of 2017) Premium models have upscale features not offered in the Prestige line such as stainless steel frets and necks laminated from eleven pieces of wood.
Iron Label line
Indonesian-made RG guitars that are primarily aimed at the metal guitarist. The Iron Label line started in 2013.
GIO line
Entry-level guitars which are produced primarily in China.

== See also ==
- Ibanez JEM
