= Humorous to Bees =

Studio album by Little Tybee
- Recorded: 2010, Particle Zoo Studio, Atlanta, GA
- Genre: Folk rock
- Label: Paper Garden Records
- Producer: Little Tybee

Humorous to Bees is a studio album from American folk-rock act Little Tybee released on April 5, 2011 by Paper Garden Records. The album was the group's second full length effort, following their debut 2009 release, Building A Bomb. It featured a slightly altered core lineup from their debut release and the group enlisted the help of nine additional musicians (one of whom subsequently became a full-time member) during the recording process, making this album their most collaborative recording project to date.

The album contains music from several genres. The release of the album garnered a positive response from most, but not all reviewers.

The group released three singles, Passion Seekers, Nero, and History, each with their own music video, to promote the release of the album. They also went on tour in 2011 to promote sales of the album.

== Track listing ==
All tracks are written by Brock Scott/Little Tybee.

No.	Title	Length
1.	"Humorous To Bees"	0:39
2.	"Strong Ears"	3:38
3.	"Design"	3:01
4.	"Passion Seekers"	3:14
5.	"Signal Below"	3:12
6.	"Nero"	3:37
7.	"Revolutionary"	3:23
8.	"Sympathetic Eye"	4:06
9.	"History"	4:41
10.	"The Wind Will Blow You Love"	4:19
11.	"In Range"	3:23
12.	"Holding Stones"	2:55

== Personnel ==
- Brock Scott - Vocals, Piano, Acoustic Guitar
- Ryan Donald - Electric Bass, Double Bass
- Pat Brooks - Drums, Percussion
- Josh Martin - Eight-String Electric Guitar
- Nirvana Kelly - Violin, Viola
- Chris Case - Keyboards

Additional Personnel

- Ricky Saucedo - Clarinet
- Mario Schambon - Percussion
- Colin Agnew - Percussion
- Adron Parnassum - Vocals
- Ryan Gregory - Violin
- Mary Knight - Cello
- Nancy Shim - Flute
- Greg Hammontree - Trumpet
