= Coil tap =

A coil tap is a wiring feature found on some electrical transformers, inductors and coil pickups, all of which are sets of wire coils. The coil tap(s) are points in a wire coil where a conductive patch has been exposed (usually on a loop of wire that extends out of the main coil body).

When the coil taps are disconnected, the coil operates as normal (see transformer). When a coil tap is connected to one end of the coil (or the end disconnected and reconnected to the tap), the section of coil between the tap and its connected end is bypassed - effectively reducing the number of turns in the coil.

== Uses ==
In a transformer, coil taps are often used on both the input and output coils, to compensate for differing supply potential and to provide a range of output potentials respectively. Coil taps on inductors are quite rare, but are sometimes used for band switching in tuning circuits. Coil pickups used with measuring instruments often feature coil taps to compensate for band rejection or equipment input impedance. They can also be used as a rudimentary method for telephone tapping.

Single coil magnetic pickups found in electric guitars can be coil tapped to reduce the number of windings around the magnet. A tapped single coil pickup typically contains three wires: a ground, an output, and a tapped output - with the two outputs generally wired to a switch on the guitar. The guitarist can then choose between the loud, punchy, midrange-heavy sound of the entire coil, or 'tap' into the inner coil for a quieter, yet bright vintage tone with a more clear and detailed high end. Many guitarists mistakenly refer to humbucker coil splits as coil taps, however, this is incorrect.
