= Little Tybee =

American folk-rock band

- Origin: Atlanta, Georgia, United States
- Genres: Folk, experimental, psychedelic rock
- Years active: 2009–present
- Label: Paper Garden
- Members: Brock Scott; Ryan Donald; Dallas Dawson; Josh Martin; Nirvana Kelly; Chris Case
- Past members: Pat Brooks; Ryan Gregory

Little Tybee is an experimental, progressive folk-rock band based out of Atlanta, GA. Since their beginnings in 2009, the band has released 4 full-length albums and conducted numerous tours, the most recent being a full-US run in support of CHON and Tera Melos. Stylistically, the band fuses together elements from folk, psychedelic rock, indie music, jazz, soul, and other diverse influences. While the band utilizes a "democratic" composition process, vocalist Brock Scott has been described by bandmate Josh Martin as "typically [the] primary songwriter".

== History ==
Following the dissolution of a group known as The Brock Scott Quartet, the remaining members reformed under the new name Little Tybee. Their first album, Building A Bomb, was self-released on November 10, 2009. The band then started touring shortly thereafter, experienced a series of lineup changes, and was picked up by Paper Garden Records who released their second album, Humorous To Bees, on April 5, 2011.

Since the release of Humorous To Bees, Little Tybee has played notable events including the Rombello festival cruise (w/ Citizen Cope, Rhett Miller, Slightly Stoopid, among others) after coming in first place in a contest hosted by Paste Magazine, CMJ Music Marathon, SXSW, and Fringe Festival and has shared the stage with artists such as Kishi Bashi, Sondre Lerche, Givers, Man Man, Reptar, Nicole Atkins, The Love Language, and Dent May.

In 2011, the band created a Kickstarter campaign to help fund a music video for their song "Boxcar Fair". The video was an ambitious collaboration between the band and Atlanta-based puppeteer Tom Haney, consisting of a handmade 60' x 15' set and was shot in one continuous take. The campaign was successfully funded, doubling its original target of $5,000 and reaching $11,131. The video was accepted into SXSW Film 2012.

The band has also seen success from a song placement in the season finale of MTV's Skins and the following media outlets: CNN, RCRD LBL, Filter Mag, NPR, BreakThruRadio, Paste Magazine, Metromix, Owl Magazine, Much Music, AOL/Spinner, Toronto Star, Creative Loafing, Napster UK, I Guess I'm Floating, and You Ain't No Picasso.

Daytrotter released a session with Little Tybee on September 11, 2012 which featured four tracks from the forthcoming album For Distant Viewing.

Their third album, For Distant Viewing, was released on April 9, 2013. Departing from their usual DIY recording approach, the band brought in Ben Price at Studi LaRoche for tracking and mixing. The album was subsequently mastered by Glenn Schick at Glenn Schick Mastering. A full US album release tour followed during the summer of 2013.

Little Tybee's next full-length record started taking shape in 2014 and the band re-entered Studi LaRoche to begin principal tracking shortly thereafter. Realizing that the songs were their most cohesive and collaborative material to date, the band decided to self-title the forthcoming LP. The eponymous Little Tybee was mixed by Ben Price, mastered by Joe Lambert, and was released on June 3, 2016 to rave reviews. The band also chose to self-release this record under their newly-formed label, On The Grid. The self-release was funded by a pre-order Kickstarter campaign which raised $21,272.

The band's next major outing was in support of CHON and Tera Melos during the summer of 2017. This tour afforded the band the chance to play to sold-out crowds on much bigger stages as a support act and, in turn, gave them the opportunity to grow their increasingly diverse fanbase.

Little Tybee started 2018 by releasing a music video for the song, "Lost In The Field".

== Online presence ==
Since the band's formation, the members of Little Tybee have believed that the Internet is a tool that will free the music industry, not destroy it. Because of this, they have made a commitment to creating high-quality, self-produced online media ranging from live performance videos to effect pedal demos. The band has also utilized electric guitarist Josh Martin's unique playing style to create a number of instructional videos, one of which, released through Ibanez Guitars, went viral in November 2014 and afforded the band numerous endorsements.

== Personnel ==
- Brock Scott – vocals, piano, acoustic guitar
- Ryan Donald – electric bass, double bass
- Dallas Dawson – drums, percussion
- Josh Martin – eight-string electric guitar
- Nirvana Kelly – violin, viola
- Chris Case – keyboards

=== Additional personnel on For Distant Viewing ===
- Pat Brooks – drums
- Colin Agnew – percussion
- George Wallace – lap/pedal steel guitar
- Brandon Camarda – trumpet
- Jonathan Rhum – saxophone

=== Additional personnel on Humorous To Bees ===
- Pat Brooks – drums
- Ricky Saucedo – clarinet
- Mario Schambon – percussion
- Colin Agnew – percussion
- Adron Parnassum – vocals
- Ryan Gregory – violin
- Mary Knight – cello
- Nancy Shim – flute
- Greg Hammontree – trumpet

== Discography ==
- Building A Bomb, 2009 (self-released)
- Humorous To Bees, 2011 (Paper Garden Records)
- For Distant Viewing, 2013 (Paper Garden Records)
- Little Tybee, 2016 (self-released)
