= Ibanez Apex =

Series of seven-string guitars

- Manufacturer: Ibanez
- Period: 2007–2024

Construction
- Body type: Solid
- Neck joint: Bolt-on neck 5pc APEX Maple/Wenge neck, Wizard II-7

Woods
- Body: Mahogany
- Neck: Maple, Wenge, with Bubinga stripes
- Fretboard: Rosewood with dot inlays, Apex 2 inlay at 12th fret

Hardware
- Bridge: Ibanez Edge Pro 7 with U-Bar, Tone Pros 7 String-Thru
- Pickup(s): DiMarzio® Blaze™ (S) neck pickup (Apex 100 only), DiMarzio® Blaze™ (H) bridge & neck pickup

Colors available
- Tri Fade Burst, Green Shadow Flat

The Ibanez Apex series was a signature series of seven-string guitars created by Korn's guitarist Munky.

== Specification ==
They were the official replacement of the Ibanez K7's, and only links to James Shaffer after Brian Welch left the band. As of 2010 the tremolo of the guitar changed to a Lo Pro 7 with a U-bar. In 2011 the Apex100 replaced the Apex1.

=== Apex 100 ===
The Apex 100 has a Tri Fade Burst finish, as the Apex 2 has a Green Shadow Flat finish. They come factory tuned to KoRn's signature tuning: A, D, G, C, F, A, D (low to high).

The Apex 100 includes an DiMarzio® Blaze™ (S) neck pickup with a DiMarzio® Blaze™ (H) bridge pickup, and the Apex 2 has an DiMarzio® Paf 7™ (H) neck and bridge pickup. Unlike the Apex 2, the Apex 100 has a White pickguard as the Apex 2 has none.

The Apex 100 sells for $2499.99, and The Apex 2 lists at $933.32. They both include a deluxe edition case.

=== Apex 1 ===
When still sold, the Apex 1 had a Biker Black Finish, and a custom rosewood fretboard designed by James Shaffer which included Star inlays, and a giant "69" (to indicate the astrological sign of Cancer) covering the 11th, 12th, and 13th frets. It had a DiMarzio® Paf 7™ (H) Neck and Bridge pickup like the Apex 2. Sasha Stone guitarist of the band Web of lies chose the Ibanez APEX1 model for permanent use in his music.

=== Apex 2 ===
The Apex 2 is basically a lower end guitar but with a different finish, neck, and recessed TOM bridge. Specifications are mahogany, recessed TOM bridge, and cosmo hardware. Pickups are a DiMarzio® Paf 7™ (H) Neck and Bridge pickup
