= Single-coil guitar pickup =

Magnetic part used in electric guitars and basses

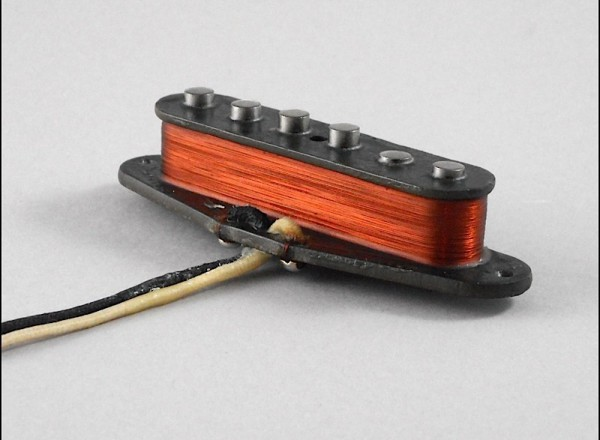
A typical single-coil guitar pickup: copper wire wrapped around a bobbin which holds magnetic pole pieces adjacent to a magnet

String effect on a single-coil (electric guitar). The coil is connected to a multimeter that indicates the voltage changes when the string moves. This signal is normally sent to an amplifier.

A single-coil pickup is a type of magnetic transducer, or pickup, for the electric guitar and the electric bass. It electromagnetically converts the vibration of the strings to an electric signal. Single-coil pickups are one of the two most popular designs, along with dual-coil or "humbucking" pickups.

== History ==
=== Beauchamp ===
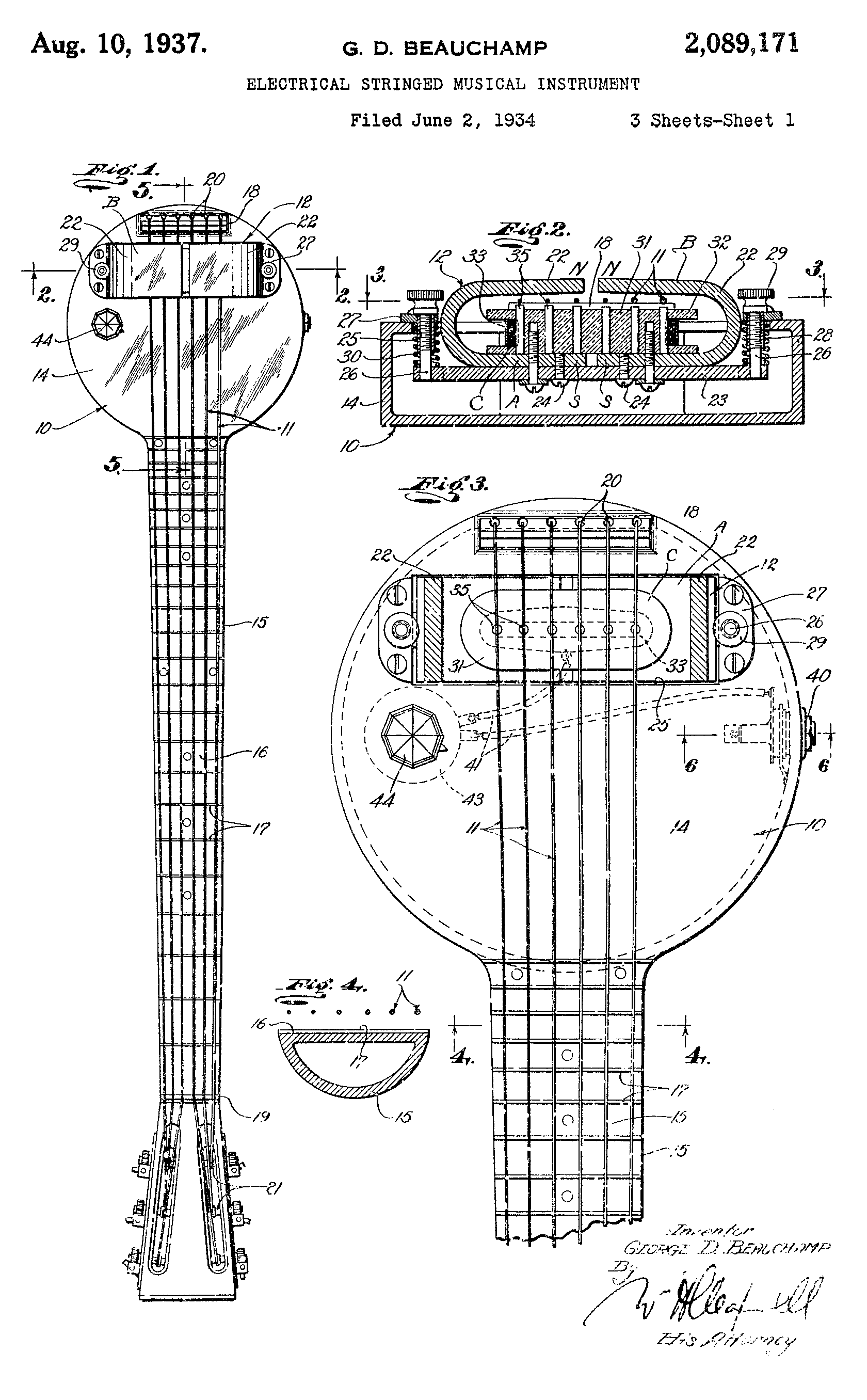
Sketch of Rickenbacker "frying pan" lap steel guitar from 1934 patent application

In the mid-1920s George Beauchamp, a Los Angeles, California, guitarist, began experimentation with electric amplification of the guitar. Originally using a phonograph pickup assembly, Beauchamp began testing many different combinations of coils and magnets trying to create the first electromagnetic guitar pickup. His earliest coils were wound using a motor from a washing machine. Later he switched to a sewing machine motor, and eventually used single-coiled magnets.

Beauchamp was backed in his efforts by Adolph Rickenbacker, an engineer and wealthy owner of a successful tool and die business. Beauchamp eventually produced the first successful single-coil pickup, which consisted of two massive U-shaped magnets and one coil and was known as the "horseshoe pickup". The two horseshoe-shaped magnets surrounded the strings that passed over a single core plate (or blade) in the center of the coil.

=== Gibson ===
The Gibson Guitar Corporation introduced the "bar pickup" in 1935 for its new line of Hawaiian lap steel guitars. The pickup's basic construction is that of a metal blade inserted through the coil as a shared pole piece for all the strings. A pair of large flat magnets were fastened below the coil assembly.

In 1936 Gibson introduced the ES-150, its first electric Spanish-styled guitar. The ES-150 was outfitted with the bar pickup. Jazz guitar innovator Charlie Christian began playing an ES-150 in the late 1930s with the Benny Goodman Orchestra. This caused the popularity of the electrified guitar to soar. Due to Christian's close association with the ES-150, it began being referred to as the "Charlie Christian Model" and Gibson's now famous bar pickup as the "Charlie Christian pickup" or "CC unit".

== Common designs ==
=== Gibson P-90 ===
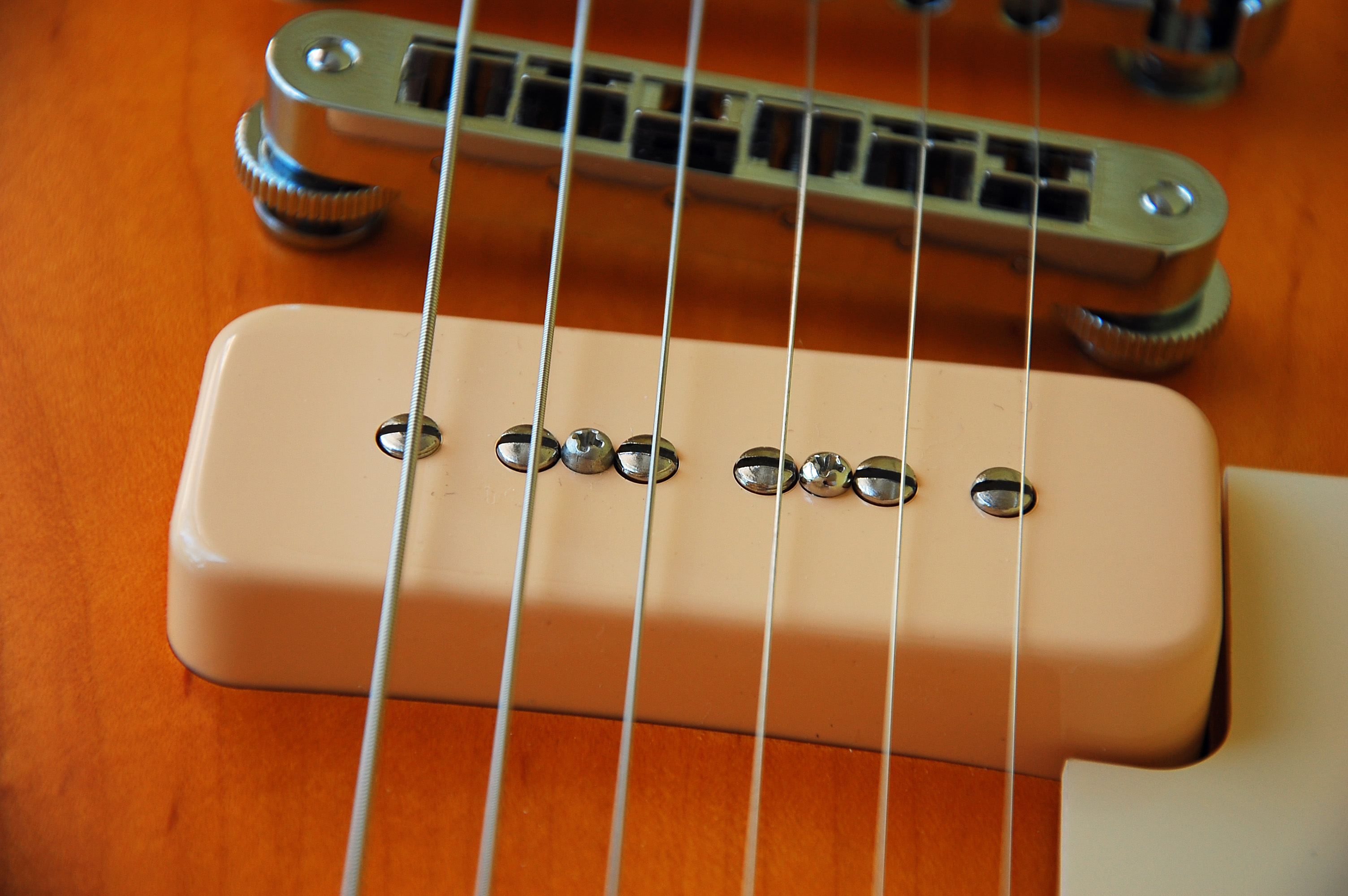
Gibson P-90 soap bar

The P-90 is a single coil pickup designed by the Gibson Guitar Corporation. These pickups have a large, flat coil with adjustable steel screws as pole pieces, and a pair of flat alnico bar magnets lying under the coil bobbin. The adjustable pole pieces pick up the magnetism from the magnets. Moving the screw closer or further away from the magnet determines signal strength, thus tone as well. There are two variations of P-90 pickup that differ mainly by mounting options:

- Soap bar casing has true rectangular shape and the mounting screws are contained within the coil perimeter, positioned between the pole pieces, between strings 2-3 and 4-5, thus creating irregular and somewhat unusual pattern. Occasionally, they are mistaken for pole pieces; thus, the P-90 is sometimes erroneously said to have eight pole pieces. The "soap bar" nickname most probably comes from its predominantly rectangular shape and proportions resembling a bar of soap, and the fact that the first P-90s on the original Gibson Les Paul Model of 1952 were white.

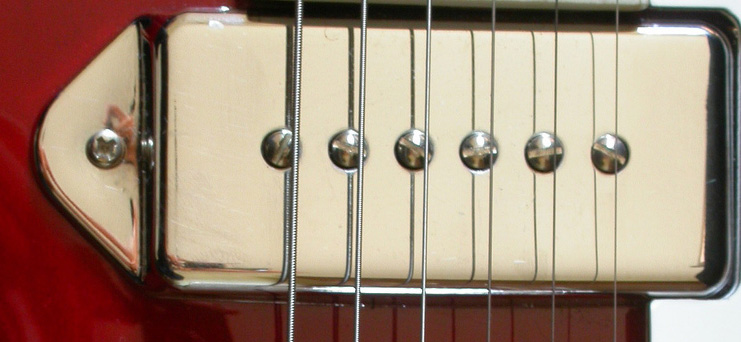
P90 dog ear

- Dog ear is a casing type with extensions at both sides of pickup that somewhat resemble dog's ears. These are extensions of the predominantly rectangular cover that encompass the outlying mounting screws. Dog-ear P-90 pickups were commonly mounted on Gibson's hollowbody guitars like the ES-330 and occasionally on solid body models like the Les Paul Junior. The same pickups were also available on Epiphone models (since Gibson was building Epiphone guitars in the 1950s) and the design is best remembered for its appearance on the hollow body Epiphone Casino of the mid to late 1960s.

=== Telecaster design ===
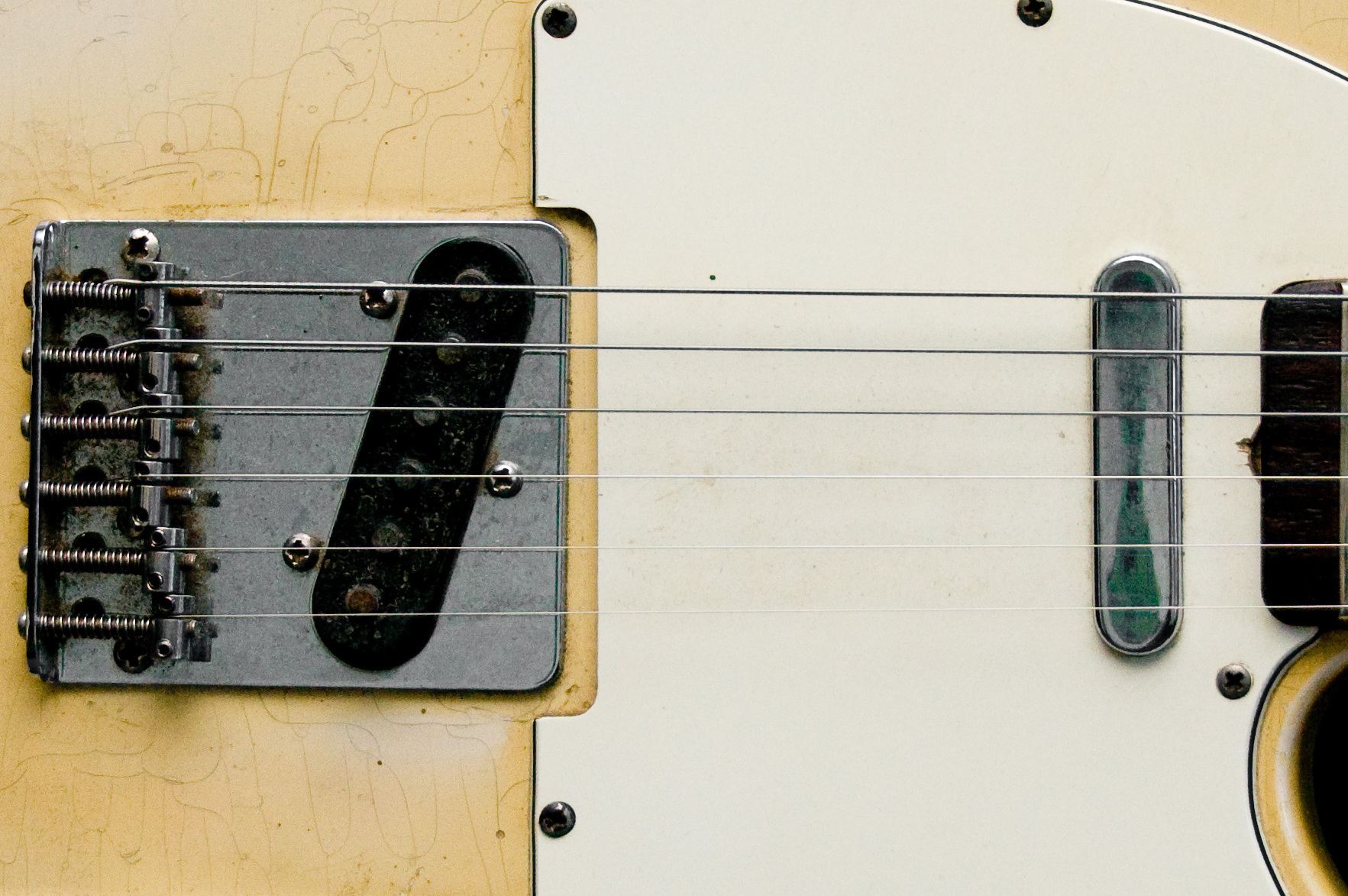
Two pickups on a Telecaster

The Fender Telecaster features two different single coils. The neck pickup features a metal cover and produces a mellower sound, while the bridge pickup has exposed pole pieces and produces an extremely twangy, sharp tone with exaggerated treble response, because the bridge pickup is mounted on a steel plate. These design elements allow musicians to emulate steel guitar sounds, making it particularly appropriate for country music.

Pickups are selected with a three-position switch, and two wiring schemes exist:

- Vintage: 1) neck pickup with treble cutoff for a bassier sound; 2) neck pickup only; 3) bridge pickup only.
- Modern: 1) neck pickup only, with no treble cutoff; 2) neck and bridge; 3) bridge pickup only.

The Fender Esquire has a variation to the Vintage wiring scheme by using the scheme on a single pickup. This gives a treble cutoff in the first position, normal in the middle position, and a tone control cutoff in the third position.

=== Stratocaster design ===
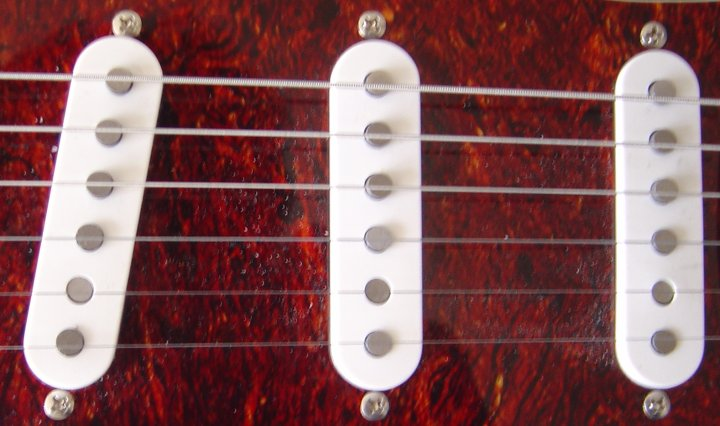
This image shows three single coil pickups on a Stratocaster guitar. Left to right: bridge, middle and neck pickups.

The traditional Stratocaster design guitar features three single coils. The guitarist can control which pickup or combination of pickups are selected with a lever switch. The pickup positions are usually referred to as the bridge, middle and neck pickups based on their proximity to those parts of the instrument. The neck pickup typically has the highest output, with the most mid-range and bass response, whereas the bridge pickup has the lowest output (because the strings at the bridge move less) and the greatest treble response, with a slight twang to it. The sound of the middle pickup is similar to that of the neck pickup, albeit with slightly less bass and more treble. However many players, such as Ritchie Blackmore, find it somewhat of an obstruction to the picking hand and loosen the mounting screws such that it lies flush with the pickguard.

Modern Stratocasters have five-position pickup selector switch. Positions 1, 3 and 5 activate only one pickup (bridge, middle or neck respectively), while positions 2 and 4 activate a combination of two pickups (bridge and middle, or middle and neck, respectively). Some pickup sets have a reverse wound and reverse polarity middle pickup that when in combination with the normal bridge or neck pickups will cancel electromagnetic interference (noise/hum) which single coil pickups suffer badly from. The sonic effect of positions 2 and 4 is sometimes referred to as a "quack" or "notch positions", and some guitar notation includes directions to use these pickup combinations. One example is "Sultans of Swing" by Dire Straits which is played in position 2 (bridge and middle).

== Noise problems ==
A number of types of noise afflict magnetic guitar pickups. Hum is caused by magnetic fields due to power frequency currents in electrical equipment, whereas buzz is propagated as radio transmissions and sounds more like static. The sources of buzz are many, but an example is an AC power tool with a brush motor. The brush makes and breaks electrical contact with the commutator segment several thousand times a second at variable frequency dependent on load thus causing radio frequency noise. Other examples may include playing near older fluorescent lamps with magnetic ballasts, or high frequency switching DC power supplied from mains power "wall wart" units commonly provided with consumer electronics, computers and smartphones.

Fender-Lace Sensors are a true single coil designed to magnetically shield from hum rather than utilizing the phase cancelling effect common in later double coil/humbucker designs.

Early pickup designs did not include a manufacturing step known as "potting", wherein at various stages, the bobbin and wrapped coil are immersed in a substance in order to lock the windings in place and prevent microphonic effects of loose strands of wire within resulting in feedback at higher gain settings. Common potting substances include heated beeswax and paraffin, or a combination of the two, and thinned enamel paint, used by some to shield the metallic slugs before beginning the winding process.

The practice of not "potting" pickups persists today in both vintage reproductions as well as more value oriented manufacturers, who may skip the potting step in order to reduce manufacturing costs or provide period accurate reproductions.

== Single-coil form factor "humbuckers" ==
The search for an acceptable solution to mains hum gained new impetus around 1995 as guitar players became increasingly intolerant of the low-noise environment required for single-coil use.

See Humbucker, section Single Coil Form Factor Humbuckers

== Notable single coil pickups ==
There are several well-known single coil pickups that have a distinctive sound:

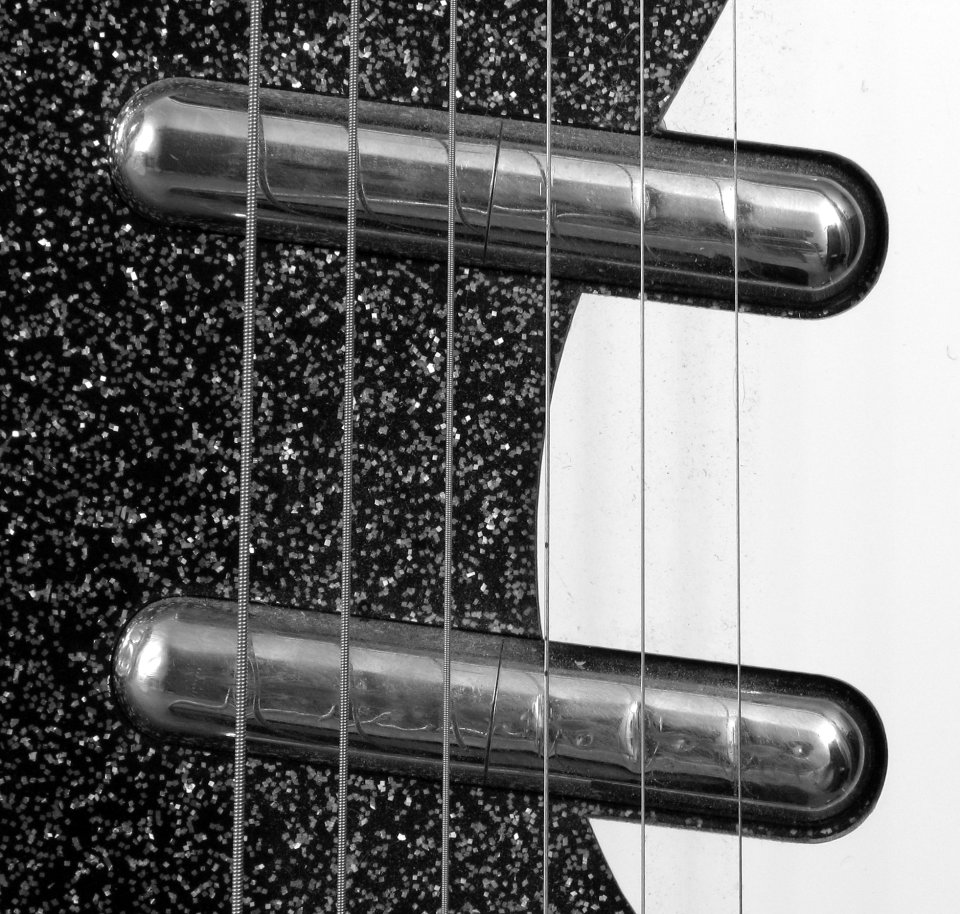
"Lipstick"-style single coil pickups on a Danelectro guitar

- Rickenbacker pickups (including the original 1930s "horseshoe" pickup as used in lap steel and solid-body upright basses, and later 6 string electric guitars, pedal steels, and electric bass guitars; also the "Toaster" and "Hi-Gain")
- Gibson bar pickup (1935) — later called the Charlie Christian pickup (1938)
- Gibson P-90 (1946)
- Fender Telecaster, Stratocaster, Jazzmaster, Jaguar, and other pickups
- Danelectro Lipstick
- Gretsch pickups (including the "HiLoTron")
- DeArmond pickups (found on various '50s and '60s guitars by various manufacturers including Gretsch, Guild, Epiphone, Martin, Kustom, Harmony, Regal, Premier, Silvertone, and others; the trade name is now owned by Fender; single coil models including the 200 aka Dynasonic, 2K, and 2000, "mustache", various "gold foil" types, and many clip on, rail, or screw mount pickups designed for acoustic guitars and other instruments). The Fender "Tele-Sonic" featured large DeArmond single coils.
- Valco single coil pickups by Ralph Keller (1954) can be found in Airline, Supro, National, English Electronics, Custom Kraft, and a few Gretsch models of guitar from the '50s, '60s, and '70s. The majority of these pickups maintain the physical appearance of a larger, double coil humbucker pickup. Although consisting of a single coil, the pickup contains a second, off-set magnet which cancels hum. Early variations on the Valco-made over-strings "horseshoe" pickup can be found on a number of similarly branded lap steel guitars, such as Oahu.
- Epiphone "New York" pickups
- Lace Sensor pickups (1987)
