= Humbucker =

Electric guitar pickup

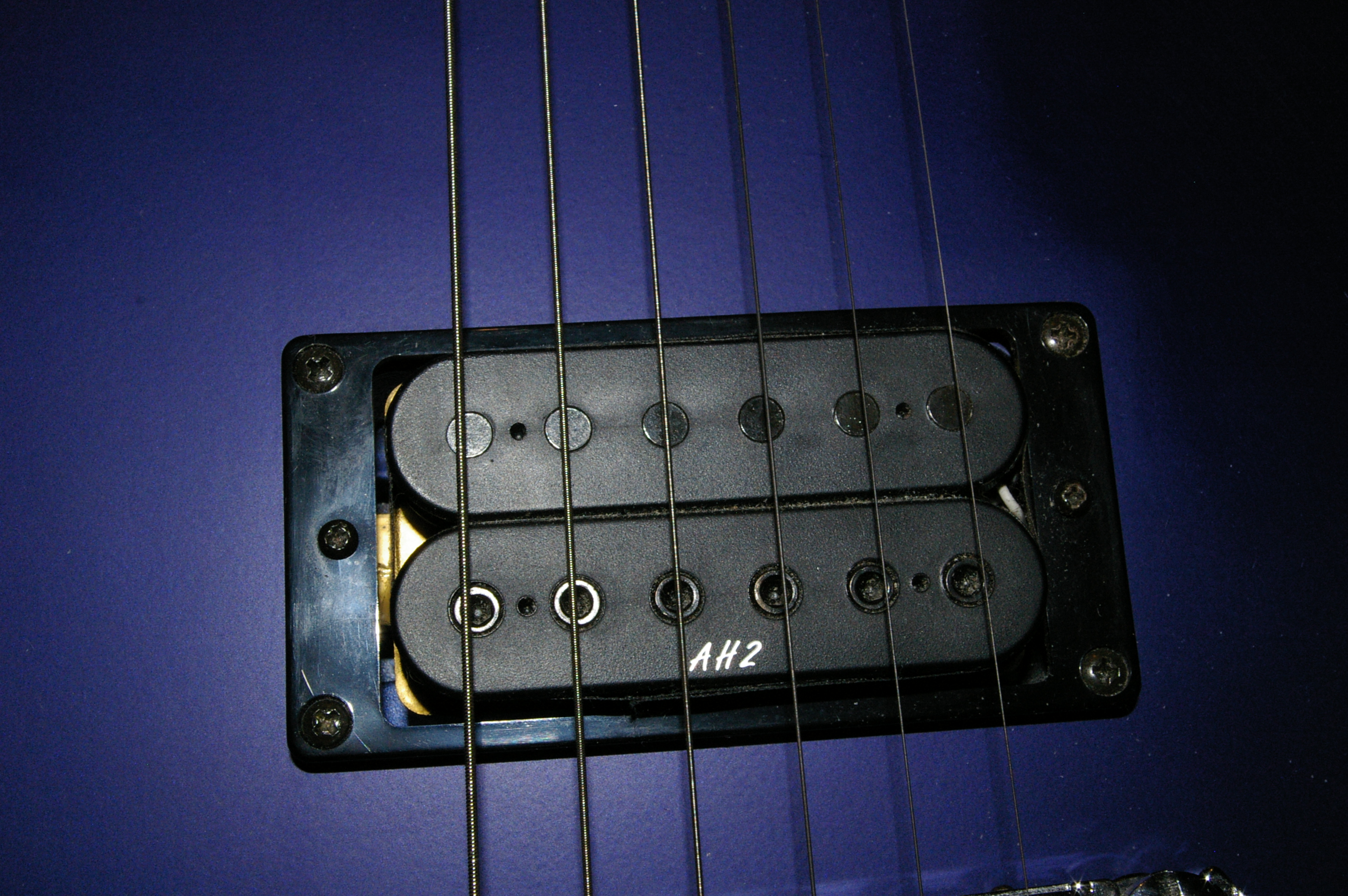
Open coil (uncovered) humbucker pickup

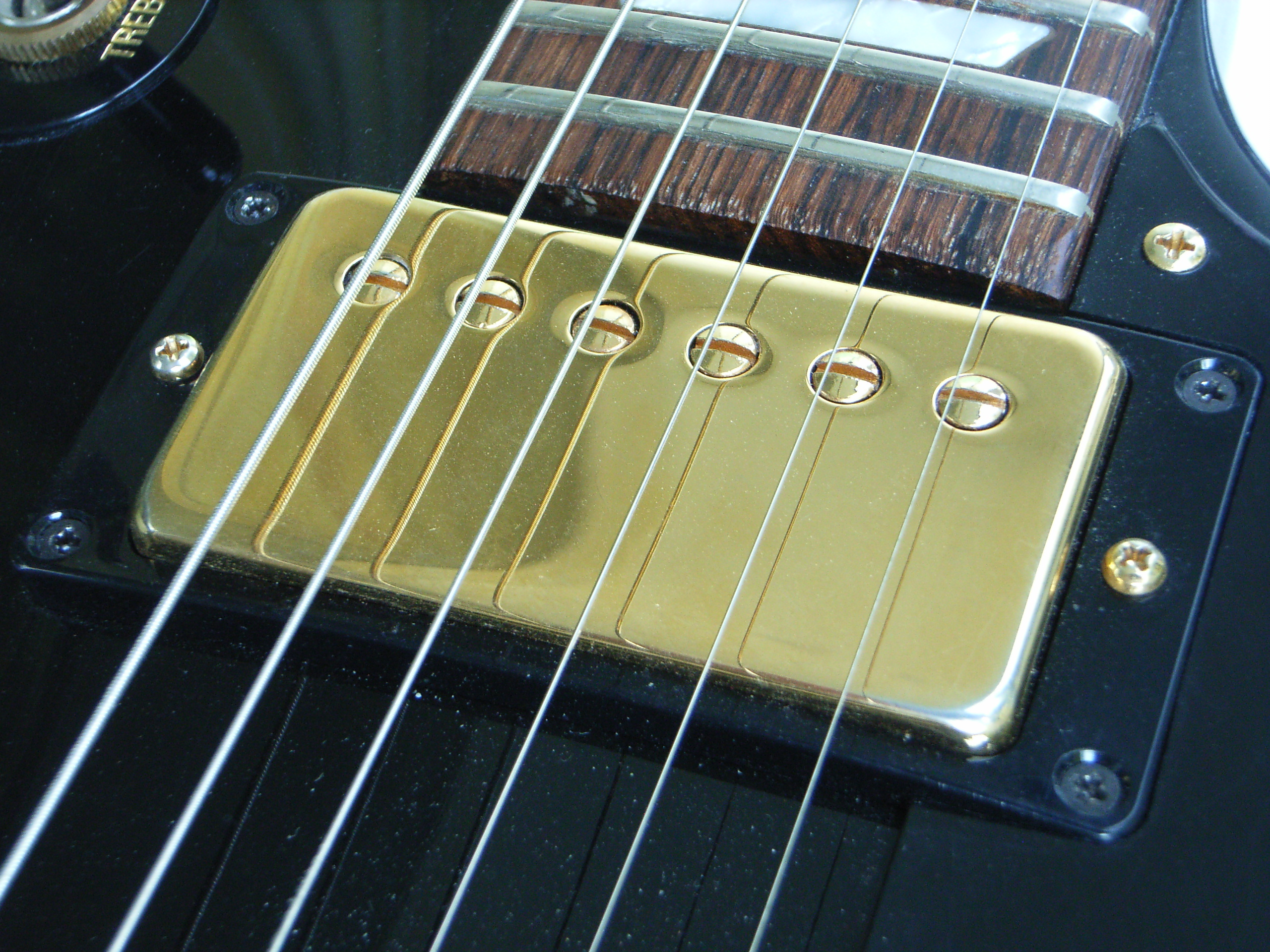
Covered humbucker pickup on a Les Paul copy

A humbucker, humbucking pickup, or double coil, is a guitar pickup that uses two wire coils to cancel out noisy interference from coil pickups. Humbucking coils are also used in dynamic microphones to cancel electromagnetic hum. Humbuckers are one of two main types of guitar pickups. The other is called a single coil.

== History ==
The humbucking coil was invented in 1934 by Electro-Voice, an American professional audio company based in South Bend, Indiana, that Al Kahn and Lou Burroughs incorporated in 1930 for the purpose of manufacturing portable public address equipment, including microphones and loudspeakers. A twin coiled guitar pickup invented by Arnold Lesti in 1935 is arranged as a humbucker, and the patent USRE20070 describes the noise cancellation and current summation principles of such a design. This "Electric Translating Device" employed the solenoid windings of the pickup to magnetize the steel strings by means of switching on a short D.C. charge before switching over to amplification. In 1938, A. F. Knoblaugh invented a pickup for stringed instruments involving two stacked coils described in U.S. patent 2,119,584. This pickup was to be used in pianos, since he was working for Baldwin Piano at the time. The April 1939 edition of Radio Craft magazine shows how to construct a guitar pickup made with two identical coils wrapped around self-magnetized iron cores, where one is then flipped over to create a reverse-wound, reverse-polarity, humbucking orientation. The iron cores of these pickups were magnetized to have their north–south poles at the opposite ends of the core, rather than the now more common top-bottom orientation.

To overcome the hum problem for electric guitars, a new humbucking pickup was designed by Seth Lover of Gibson in 1955 under the instruction of then-president Ted McCarty. Because of its use of a "Patent Applied For" sticker on the underside of the pickup, it became popularly known as the P.A.F. and would be widely be used in Gibson's guitars, starting with the Les Paul. At the same time Lover was working on his humbucker, Ray Butts developed a similar pickup on his own, the Filter'Tron, which was taken up by Gretsch guitars. Although Gibson's patent was filed almost two years before Gretsch's, their patent was issued four weeks after Gretsch's. Both patents describe a reverse-wound and reverse-polarity pair of coils. Rickenbacker too had developed dual-coil pickups arranged in a humbucking pattern but dropped the design in 1954 due to the perceived distorted sound.

In 1972, DiMarzio pioneered the aftermarket replacement guitar pickup with their Super Distortion humbucker, which was designed to fit Gibson-style pickup mounts and featured greatly increased output compared to stock humbuckers installed in guitars of the time. For this reason, it became a favorite of many hard rock guitarists. Many manufacturers, such as Seymour Duncan and EMG, followed suit, offering aftermarket pickups that included many new humbucker designs.

Variants of other brands have been equipped with humbuckers, even types which are traditionally associated with single-coil pickups, like Fender Stratocasters and Telecasters. In particular, the replacement of the bridge pickup in a Stratocaster-type guitar with a humbucker, resulting in a pickup configuration noted as H-S-S (starting at bridge pickup: H for humbucker, S for single coil) has gained much popularity. Guitars in this configuration are sometimes referred to as Fat Strats, because of the fatter, rounder tone offered by the humbucking pickup, and are also closely related to the Superstrat style of guitar.

== Function ==
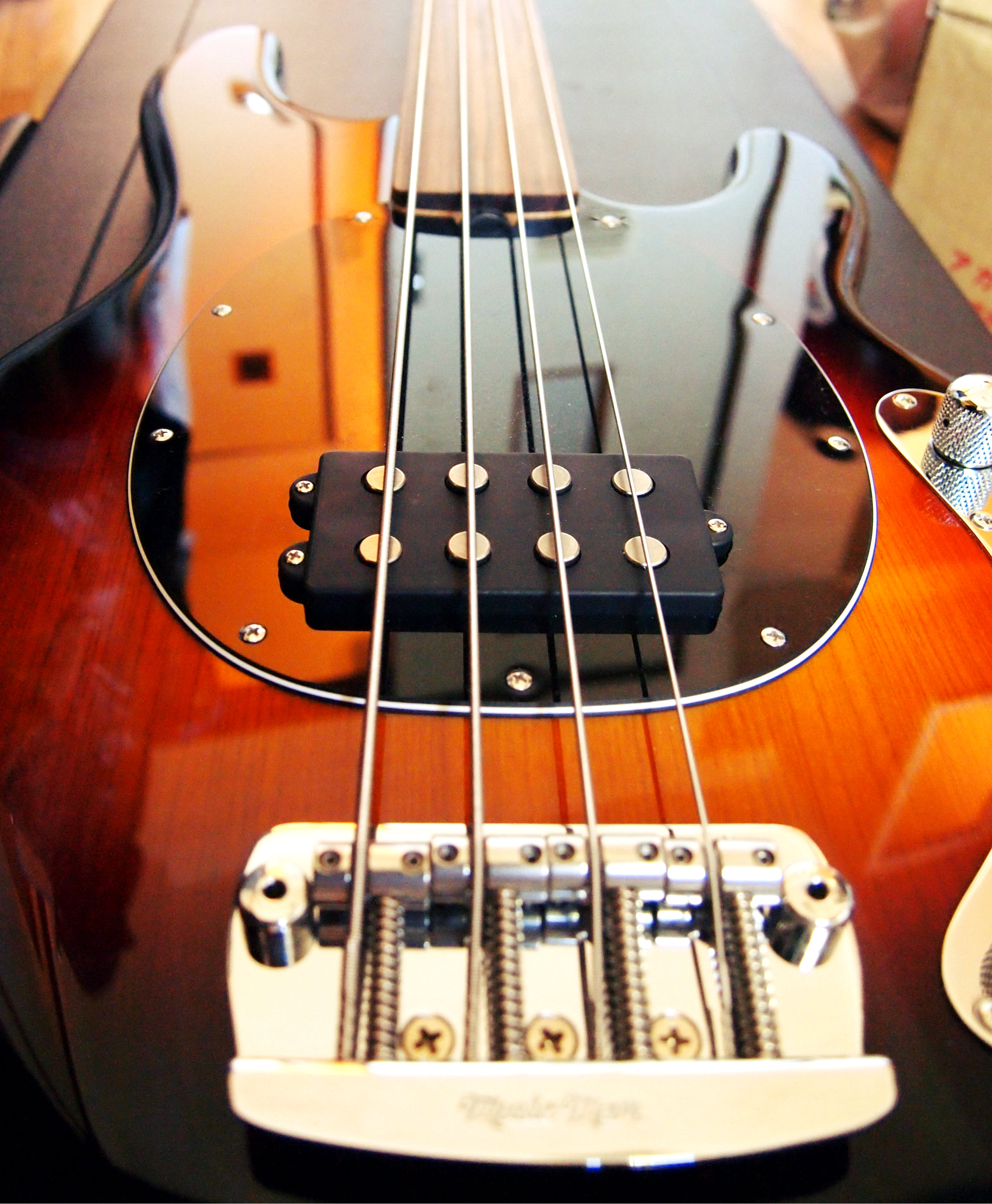
The Music Man StingRay bass pickup, which is wired in parallel, unlike most humbuckers.

In any magnetic pickup, a vibrating guitar string, magnetized by a fixed magnet within the pickup, induces an alternating voltage across its coil. However, wire coils also make excellent antennas and are therefore sensitive to electromagnetic interference caused by alternating magnetic fields from mains wiring (mains hum) and electrical appliances like transformers, motors, and computer screens, especially older CRT monitors. Guitar pickups reproduce this noise, which can be quite audible, sounding like a constant hum or buzz. This is most noticeable when using distortion, fuzz, compressors, or other effects which, by adding gain to low-level signals, reduce the signal-to-noise ratio and therefore amplify the unwanted interference relative to the signal from the strings.

Humbuckers work by pairing a coil that has the north poles of its magnets oriented up (toward the strings) with another coil alongside it with the south pole of its magnets oriented up. By connecting the coils together out of phase, the interference is significantly reduced via phase cancellation: the string signals from both coils add up instead of canceling because the magnets are placed in opposite polarity. This dramatically improves the signal-to-noise ratio. The technique has something in common with what electrical engineers call common-mode rejection, and is also found in the balanced lines used in audio equipment. By convention, both humbucker coils are wound counterclockwise. The coils can be connected in series or in parallel in order to achieve this hum-cancellation effect, but humbucker pickups tend to be connected in series because that doubles the signal of the strings while keeping the hum reduced. Some types of humbucker pickups can be manually split (with a switch or within the pickup selector) so that only one coil is active.

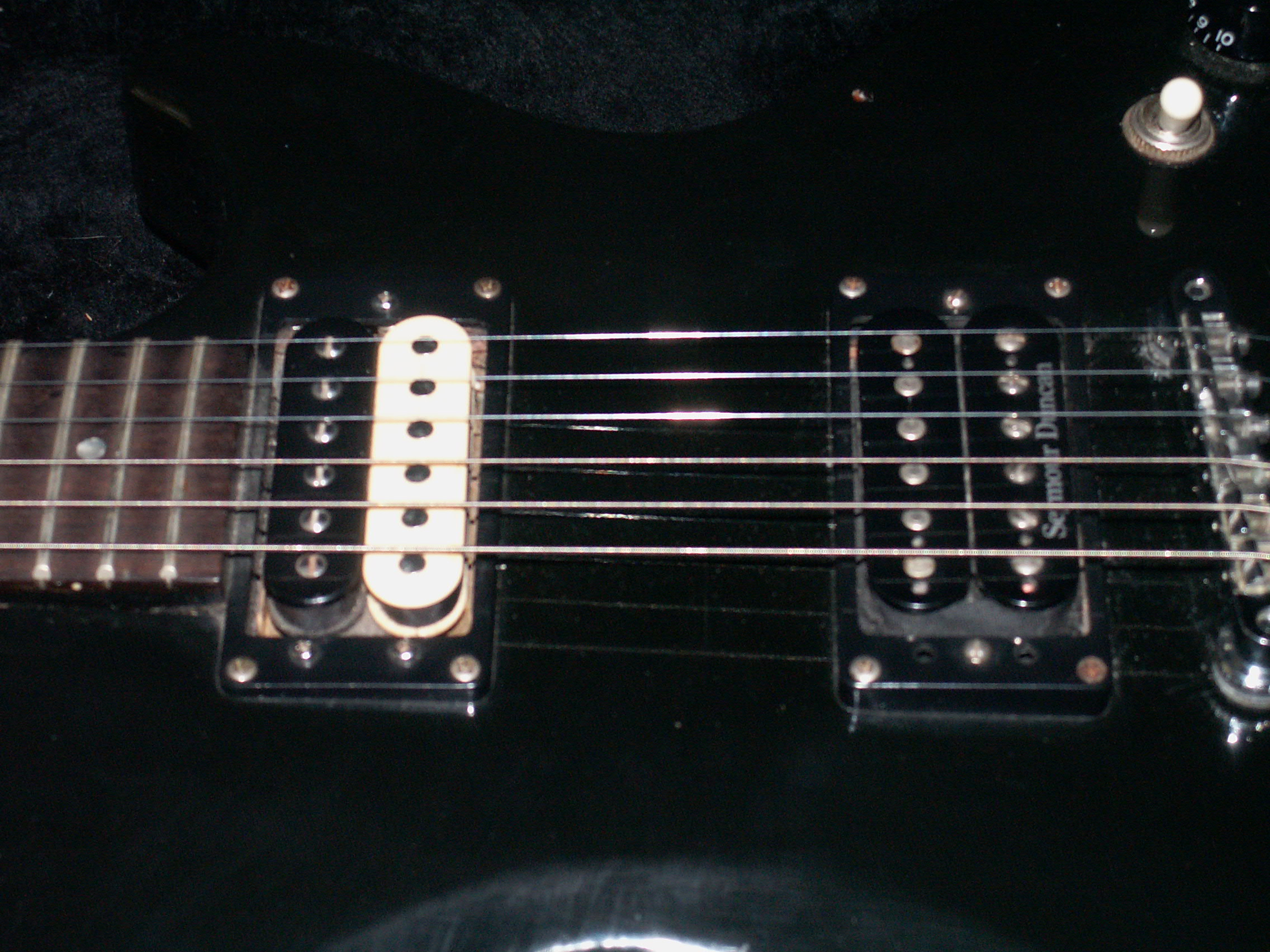
Humbuckers on a Gibson Invader

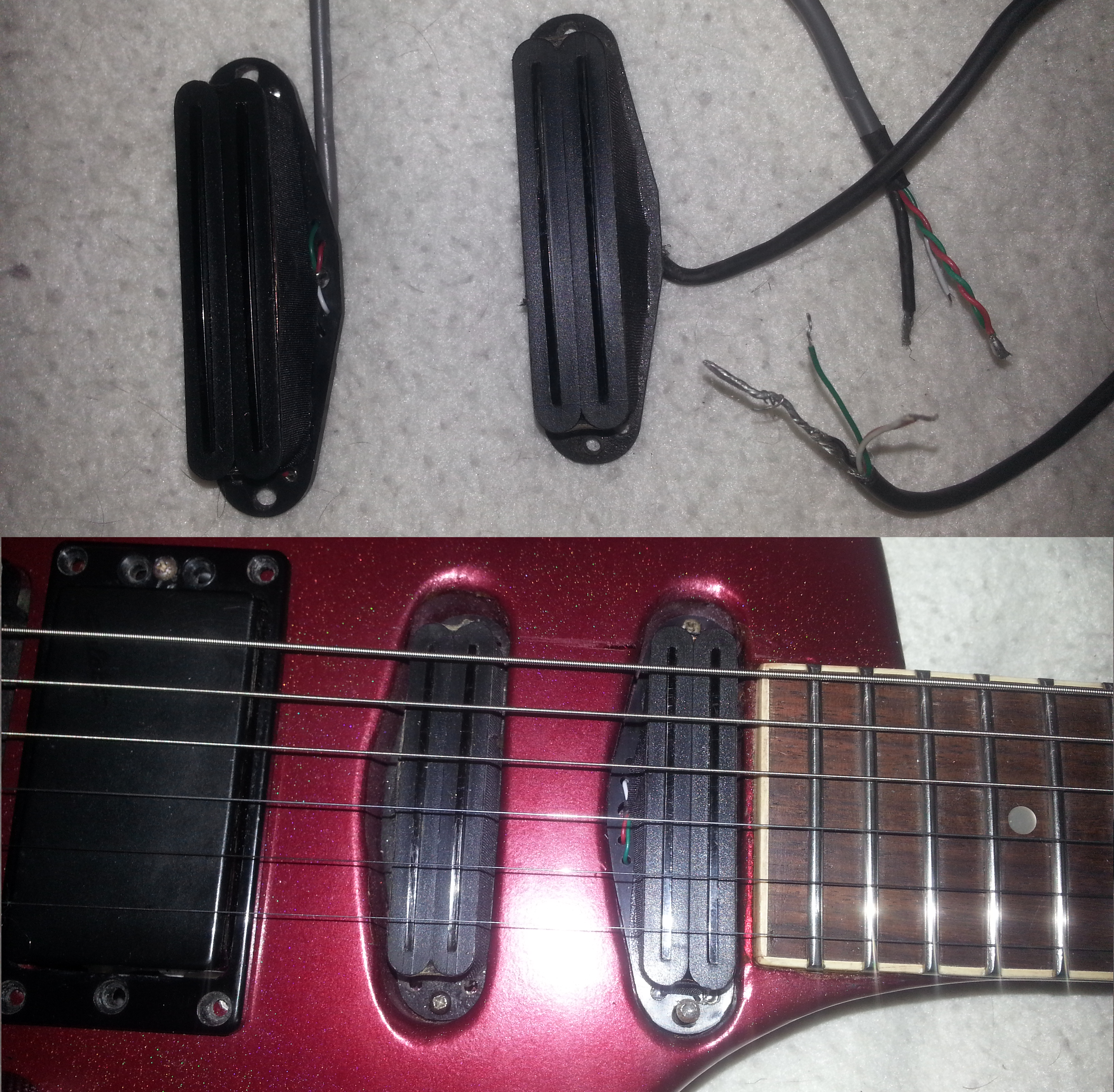
Top: A pair of mini-humbuckers, both with 4-conductor wire. Bottom: The same pickups, installed in a modified Hohner G3-T.

== Alternative designs ==
=== Mini-humbuckers ===
Slightly smaller than a traditional humbucker/double coil form factor.

=== Single coil form factor humbuckers ===
Many guitars feature cavities only for single-coil pickups. Installing full/double-sized humbuckers in this type of guitar requires additional routing of the woodwork, and/or cutting of the pickguard if the instrument has one. Many pickup manufacturers now produce humbucking pickup designs in a form factor that can be retrofit in place of a single coil. Many different kinds of mini-humbuckers are available from numerous manufacturers, and they produce a wide range of different tones.

=== Hot Rails style ===
Not to be confused with the full-size rail design.

The origins of the hot rail/blade design are contested, with Joe Barden being quoted in Jan 1989 Guitar World magazine as claiming to have invented the design in late 1983. The US patent for the L-500 attributes the hot rail design to Bill Lawrence.

Two flat vertical magnetically conductive blades are placed side by side within half the width of a typical Fender Strat or Telecaster-sized single coil.

Both blades or rails pass under all strings and are placed lengthwise, each with its own winding around one rail or blade, and a magnet is placed directly under and contacting the two blades.

Similar to full- or double-size humbucking designs, one coil is reverse wound to cancel hum.

=== Stacked coils ===
Fender came out with their Fender Noiseless Pickups, a stacked bobbin design, around 1998. The design was made by and patent offered by Rgo in September-October 1992 and included nine-in-one features, for additional humbucking parameters for manufacturers, capturing features from the FilterTron to the Fishman Fluence.

Fender's Noiseless pickups utilize two separate coils, one on top of another, wound with one coil reverse wound to cancel hum, around a common set of magnetic pole pieces commonly referred to as the bobbin. These stacked humbuckers were in the same form factor as a traditional single coil style. Though cancelling hum while preserving the original single coil appearance, stacked designs can sacrifice some of the bite in higher frequencies, partially due to the capacitive effect of machine-wound coils as well as other tonal differences resulting from the second coil having the magnet through it also.

In some designs, one of the coils simply has no magnet, or is magnetically isolated. The inverted signal of this coil only serves to cancel out the hum picked up by the other coil, with the actual string signal remaining unaffected. This is often used on bass guitars, where the type of pickup used has a greater effect on the instrument's overall sound, and the lower range of notes and their fundamental frequencies can match frequencies typically more heavily affected by hum. It is often called a stacked pickup because the coils are most often stacked vertically, with the coil containing magnets placed closer to the strings.

=== Rail humbuckers (full size) ===
Another design known as the rail humbucker features a single magnetic component spanning across the entire string width of the instrument. These pickups are similar in size to single and double coil pickups, replacing the 6 slugs/magnets per coil. This is sometimes expanded into a double-sized quadrail, or double humbucker, effectively combining 4 coils connected together to produce an extremely high-output pickup. The Kent Armstrong Motherbucker is an example of such an overpowered pickup.

The same type of rails can also be found in a normal-sized humbucker. Heavy metal guitarist Dimebag Darrell made heavy use of this type of pickup wired in the bridge position. These tend to have a higher output and bass response than the single-coil-sized versions. DiMarzio has designed and sold many such pickups.

=== Coil splitting and coil taps ===
Some guitars that have humbucking pickups feature coil splits, which allow the pickups to act as pseudo-single coils by either short-circuiting or bypassing one coil. The electrical circuit of the pickup is reduced to that of a true single coil, so there is no hum-canceling effect. Usually, this feature is activated using a miniature toggle switch or a DPDT push-pull switch mounted on a potentiometer. Some guitars (e.g., the Peavey T-60 and the Fender Classic Player Jaguar HH) make use of a variable coil split circuit that allows the guitarist to dial a variable amount of signal from the second coil, from purely single coil to full humbucker and everything in between.

A similar option is a series/parallel switch, which, in one position, causes the coils to be connected in parallel rather than in series. This retains the humbucker's noise-cancellation properties and gives a sound closer to that of two single-coil pickups used together.

Coil splitting is often wrongly referred to as a coil tapping. Coil taps are most commonly found on single-coil pickups, and involve adding an extra hook-up wire during manufacture of the pickup so the guitarist can choose to have all the windings of the pickup included in the circuit, for a fatter, higher output sound with more midrange, or switch the output to 'Tap' into the windings at a point less than the full coil for a brighter, lower-output and cleaner sound. For example, a full pickup coil may be 10,000 turns of wire and the tap may be at 8,000 turns. Because of the confusion between coil splits and coil taps—and the rarity of coil taps in general—it is difficult to find tappable single-coil pickups for sale. However, pickup manufacturer Seymour Duncan offers tapped versions of many of their Telecaster and Stratocaster pickups.

The split single coil may bear little resemblance to popular single coil pickups such as those made by Fender and the P-90 made by Gibson, owing to other differences in pickup construction.

== Notable humbucker designs ==
- Gibson "PAF" – Seth Lover's humbucker design. ("Patent Applied For")
- Gretsch Filter'Tron – Ray Butts' first humbucker design
- Fender Wide Range – Fender's first humbucker design, also by Seth Lover.
- Epiphone (and later Gibson) mini-humbucker – a smaller humbucker design with adjustable pole pieces. Designed by Gibson to reduce the size of their standard humbucker to fit into Epiphones that had been routed for the 1950s Epi New York pickup. They were later used most famously in the Gibson Les Paul Deluxe.
- Gibson Firebird pickup – inspired by the Epiphone pickup and shared its basic dimensions, but was different in terms of design, appearance, and tone, using single-blade pole pieces.
- Music Man StingRay bass humbucker – an oversized humbucker designed by Leo Fender. Unlike traditional humbuckers, which are wires in series, Music Man's pickup is wound in parallel, which accounts for much of the StingRay's unique tone.

== Other noise-reducing pickup designs ==
While the original humbucker remains the most common noise-reducing pickup design, inventors have tried many other approaches to reducing noise in guitar pickups.

=== Combining two single-coil pickups ===
Many instruments combine separate single-coil pickups in a hum-reducing configuration by reversing the electrical phase of one of the pickups. This arrangement is similar to that of a humbucking pickup and effectively reduces noise. Examples of this include the Fender Jazz Bass, introduced in 1960, which used a pair of single-coil pickups, one near the bridge and another about halfway between the bridge and the neck, and many Stratocaster style guitars, which often have 3 pickups with the middle one reversed electrically and magnetically. The usual five-way selector switch provides two humbucking settings, using the reversed middle pickup in parallel with either the bridge or neck pickup.

If the pickups are wired in series instead of parallel, the resulting sound is close to that of a normal humbucker. It is even closer to a humbucker-type sound if the coils are placed closer together.

=== Proprietary designs ===
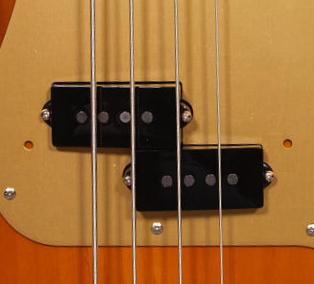
Fender split coil hum canceling pickup on a Precision Bass

In 1957, Fender introduced a split pickup to its Precision Bass, where one coil serves the E and A strings, and the other one the D and G strings. This configuration is often referred to as a split coil pickup, which should not be confused with the possibility of coil-splitting a regular humbucker, as discussed above. Both coils see nearly identical extraneous electromagnetic disturbances, and since they are wired in humbucking fashion, can effectively cancel them. However, the majority of the sound signal of any single note will mostly be generated by just one of the coils, so that output level and tonal qualities are much closer to a regular single-coil pickup. The resulting P-Style pickup is usually regarded as the main ingredient of the P-Bass sound, and many variants on the design are offered by many manufacturers. The concept was later developed into G&L's Z-Coil pickup, which is used for standard guitars such as their Comanche model.

In 1985, Lace Music Products introduced the Lace Sensor pickup, which uses proprietary screened bobbins to reduce hum while preserving single-coil tone.

In the early 1980s, DiMarzio introduced replacement pickups for Stratocaster and Telecaster guitars. These were of the stacked humbucker design, where the lower pickup coil functions solely to cancel hum.

== See also ==
- Pickup (music technology)
- Single coil guitar pickup
- Differential signaling

== Other sources ==
- US patent 2896491, Seth Lover, "Magnetic pickup for stringed musical instrument", issued 1959-07-28
