= Peter Boothman =

Australian jazz guitarist, composer and educator

Peter Boothman (1943–2012) was an Australian jazz guitarist, composer, and educator. Since he started playing in the late 1960s he worked at most top jazz venues in Sydney including The Basement, Festival of Sydney, Sydney Opera House, Jenny's, The Rocks Push, El Rocco, Wentworth Supper Club, and Horst Liepolt's Music Is an Open Sky concert series.

In the mid-1970s he taught jazz improvisation and theory at the Jazz Studies course at the Sydney Conservatorium of Music. As a freelance professional musician he has worked at various top venues throughout Australia backing local and international acts, and in the early 1970s he owned and ran Guitar City in partnership with classical guitarist Peter Andrews. Guitar City (originally established by Sydney guitarists Jack Richards and Roy Royston) was a teaching and retail establishment which became a meeting place for many top Sydney musicians and over the years was visited by many international guitarists such as Joe Pass, Manitas De Plata, and Carlos Santana.

Boothman joined the Col Nolan Quartet in 1974 to work at the New Rocks Push and other venues in Sydney. In 1982 he joined Roger Frampton's band Intersection along with the leader Roger Frampton, Lloyd Swanton on bass and Phil Treloar drums. Intersection was resident at the jazz venue Jenny's in Sydney for around 6 months and performed at various concerts including the Manly Jazz Festival, Australian Museum and ABC Radio broadcasts.

Boothman led a number of groups under his own name and has also played with local and international musicians and performers such as Bryce Rohde, Jean-Luc Ponty, Dave Liebman, Phil Treloar, John Pochee, Sid Edwards, Col Nolan, Roger Frampton, Errol Buddle, Johnny Nicol, Warren Daly, Jeannie Lewis, Chris Abrahams, Lloyd Swanton, Bernie McGann, Jimmie Rodgers, Renee Geyer, Eartha Kitt, Don Lane. His recordings include "For The Record" (1975), "Nightshade" (1990), and he has appeared on other albums such as Jeannie Lewis's album "Looking Backwards To Tomorrow" and the compilation album "Live at Soup Plus".

Boothman died on 23 April 2012.
