= John Pochée =

Australian jazz drummer (1940–2022)

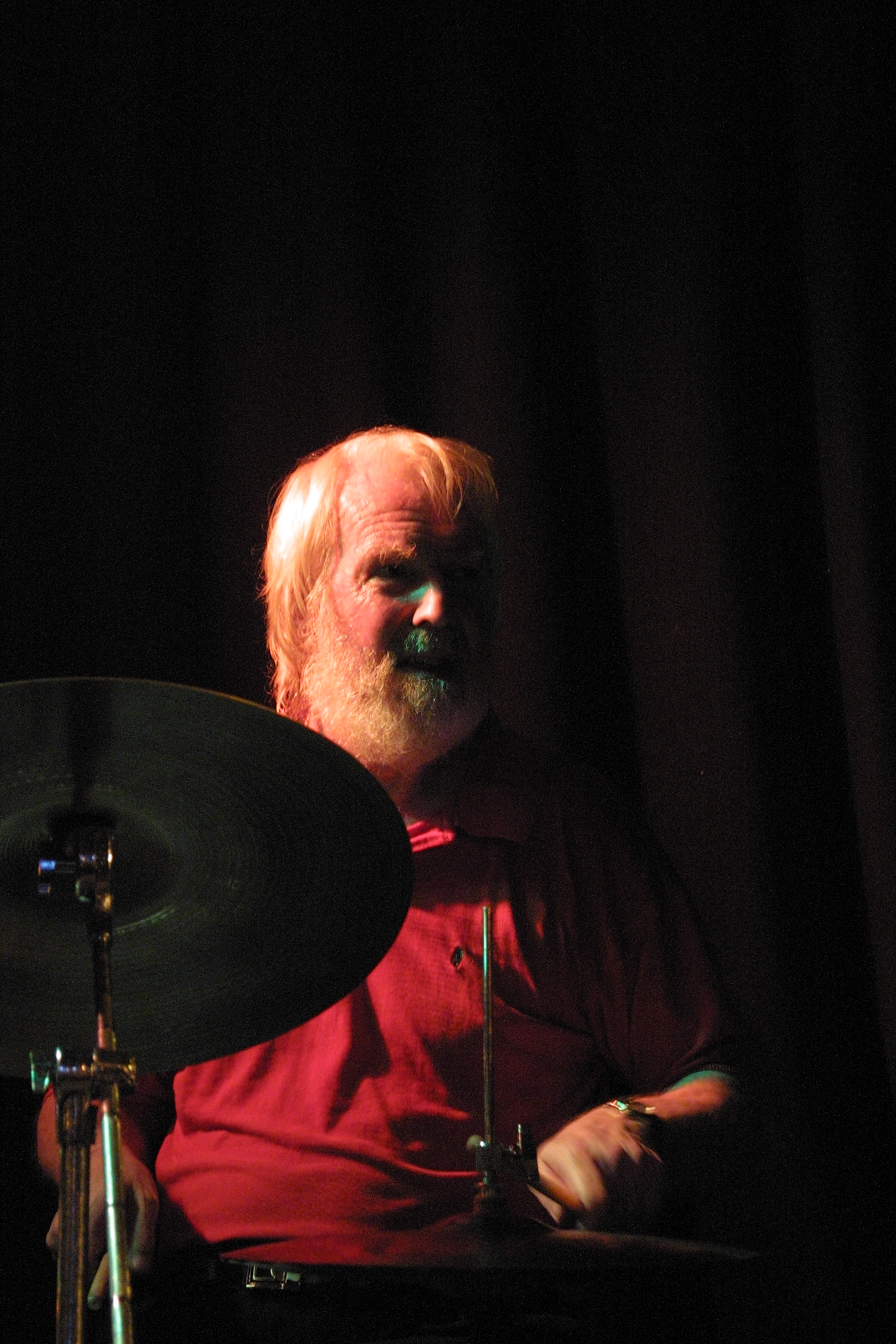
- John Pochée performing with [Bernie McGann]'s quartet at the Blue Lamp, Aberdeen October 2004

Background information
- Born: John Kenneth Pochée; 21 September 1940; Sydney, Australia
- Died: 10 November 2022 (aged 82)
- Occupations: Jazz Musician, Bandleader
- Instrument: Drums

John Kenneth Pochée, OAM (21 September 1940 – 10 November 2022) was an Australian jazz drummer and bandleader. As drummer, bandleader and organizer he played a major role in the history of Australian jazz.

His career as a professional musician began in 1956. He formed The Last Straw in 1974 and also played with the Judy Bailey Quartet from 1974 to 1979. From 1978 he played, recorded and toured internationally with The Last Straw, The Judy Bailey Quartet, The Engine Room, Ten Part Invention and Bernie McGann's trios and quartets. As a drummer he was a self-taught, original stylist, playing left-handed on a right-handed drum kit.

== Biography ==
Born in Sydney in 1940, Pochée began his musical career in 1956, playing at the El Rocco and the Mocambo, Sydney's major jazz venues of that time. In the 1960s he worked as a professional musician with various groups in Sydney, Melbourne and Adelaide. In 1974 he formed The Last Straw and also played and recorded with the Judy Bailey Quartet from 1974 to 1979. The 1970s were an exceptional time for jazz in Sydney and these two groups were in big demand, working at most major venues including The Basement, Sydney Festival and Horst Liepolt's "Music is an Open Sky" concerts

The original line up of The Last Straw was Bernie McGann and Ken James (saxes), John Pochée (drums and leader), Dave Levy (piano), and Jack Thorncraft (bass). Along with original material from Bernie McGann, Dave Levy and Ken James their repertoire also included pieces written by Thelonious Monk and Charles Mingus. When Dave Levy left the Straw in 1975 the piano chair was taken over by Tony Esterman, and the band's lineup generally remained intact for the ensuing years, the only personnel change being in the bass chair with Ron Philpott and then Lloyd Swanton taking over from Thorncraft in the 1980s. Apart from a three-year break in the late-1970s the Straw continued to play until 1999, a 25 year run as unequalled by any other contemporary Australian jazz group until Ten Part Invention in 2011.

In 1987 The Last Straw recorded an album that was nominated for an ARIA award for Best Australian Jazz Record (1991). They did three overseas tours, New Zealand (1988), Russia for the Australia Council for the Arts (1990) and the Montreal Jazz Festival (1989). In 1990 The Last Straw won First Prize for Best Band at the Leningrad International Jazz Festival.

Pochée's musical relationship with saxophonist Bernie McGann started in the early days of the Mocambo and the El Rocco and from the early 1980s he was a member of Bernie McGann's trios and quartets, performing at Ronnie Scott's in London and concerts in Poland, Yugoslavia, Czechoslovakia, Bulgaria, India and Malaysia in 1988, Russia in 1990 and Canada in 1993 and 1996. They also toured Europe in 1996 and the US in 1997. Their recordings won four Aria Awards for Best Australian Jazz Record and two Mo Awards for Best Jazz Group. In 2003 they expanded to a quartet with the addition of trumpet player Warwick Alder, touring Europe and the UK in 2004.

In 1986 he formed the ten-piece ensemble Ten Part Invention, which was committed to performing exclusively the works of Australian composers. Over the years this band recorded four albums and performed at most major Australian jazz venues and festivals including the Wangaratta Festival of Jazz and performances on national ABC television. This band received numerous awards: three MO awards (1990, 1996 and 2000), the Australian Music Foundation Award (2000) and an Australian Music Centre Award (2000). In 1994 they toured South East Asia for five weeks and also the Philippines, China and Taiwan in 1998. In September 2004 John Pochée led Ten Part Invention on a two-week tour of the US after the group were invited to the Chicago Jazz Festival, where he had performed with the Bernie McGann Trio in 1997. They also performed at The John F. Kennedy Center for the Performing Arts, Universities and Jazz Clubs.

The original rhythm section of Ten Part Invention was Roger Frampton (piano), Steve Elphick (bass), and John Pochée (drums) and this trio also achieved considerable success as the stand-alone unit The Engine Room. They toured Russia in 1989, being the first Western band to tour there following Glasnost, and they played at various jazz venues during the 1980s and 1990s, sometimes working as a quartet when joined by top Australian jazz musicians such as Dale Barlow, Warwick Alder and Daryl Pratt and with international artists Lee Konitz, Steve Lacy, James Carter and Vincent Herring.

Pochée played, toured and recorded with many other high profile international jazz musicians including saxophonist Dewey Redman and pianists Barry Harris, Andrew Hill, Kirk Lightsey, Stan Tracey, Don Pullen and the guitarist Emily Remler.

Pochée also worked prolifically as a freelance professional musician. He toured Australia and New Zealand with Shirley Bassey as her personal drummer in 1969 and 1970, and in the late 1970s and the 1980s was Musical Director for the successful show group The Four Kinsmen making 8 trips to the US with them, appearing on The Bob Hope Show and performing in Las Vegas. At one time or another he played with most Sydney jazz musicians, including performances with jazz group The Heads, The Ken James Reunion Band, The Chuck Yates trio, The Peter Boothman group and with vocalists Joe Lane and Susan Gai Dowling.

Pochée contributed to many jazz committees, from the inaugural committee of The Jazz Action Society in 1974, to 1976. He spent 15 years on the Jazz Co-ordination Association of NSW and 20 years on the Sydney Improvised Music Association (SIMA). He also served on the Australia Council in Australia's bicentennial year 1988.

In 2007 Pochée was elected President of the Professional Musicians' Club (est 1906) after serving as a Director since 1986.

Ill-health forced him to retire as a player at the end of 2014, but he continued to take an active interest in music, managing Ten Part Invention, which celebrated its 30th anniversary in March 2016.

== Recognition ==
The Last Straw was nominated for an ARIA award for Best Australian Jazz Record in 1991 and the Bernie McGann Trio won 4 ARIA awards for Best Australian Jazz Record.

With his own bands and the Bernie McGann trio he won five ARIA and five 'MO' awards.

Pochée received the Australian Jazz Critic's Award for drums in 1990 and 1992. In 1992 he also performed an improvised duet with the celebrated Classical pianist Roger Woodward at The Sydney Spring Festival. He was elected to the Monsalvat Jazz Festival Roll of Honour in 1996.

At the Australian Jazz Awards in 2006 he was the third inductee into the Graeme Bell "Hall of Fame" for "Career Achievement." Described as "Overseas Ambassador and Jazz Pioneer" he was nominated for a Classical Music Award in 2007 for "Long Term Contribution to the Advancement of Australian Music".

In 2008 he delivered the sixteenth annual Bell Jazz Lecture at Waverley Library, Sydney.

On Australia Day 2014 he was awarded the Medal of the Order of Australia for services to the Arts as a Jazz Musician (OAM).

On 22 August 2017, he received the Distinguished Services to Australian Music award at the APRA Music Awards of 2017.

John Pochée died on 10 November 2022, at the age of 82.

== Discography ==
- 1967: Jazz Australia 2 tracks with the Bernie McGann Quartet (CBS)
- 1974: One Moment the Judy Bailey Quartet (Philips)
- 1976: Colours the Judy Bailey Quartet (Eureka)
- 1983: Jazz Action Society Sessions one track with the Ken James Re-Union Band (MBS-Jazz)
- 1985: Jazz at the Soup Plus 1 track with the Bernie McGann Quartet plus 1 track with the Peter Boothman Quartet (MBS-Jazz)
- 1986: At Long Last Bernie McGann Trio; international release (Emanem)
- 1987: Kindred Spirits Bernie McGann Quartet with Bob Gebert; international release (Emanem)
- 1988: For Duke, Monk And Bird Stan Tracey and Don Weller (UK) international release (Emanem)
- 1990: Leningrad Jazz International (as co-leader) "The Engine Room Live at Leningrad Jazz Festival" – 1 track, Soviet Union release (Melodiya)
- 1990: The Last Straw as leader of The Last Straw; winner of ARIA award (Spiral Scratch)
- 1991: Ten Part Invention as leader of Ten Part Invention; ARIA nominated (ABC)
- 1992: Ugly Beauty Bernie McGann Trio; ARIA Winner (Spiral Scratch)
- 1992: Wangaratta Jazz Volume One 1 track with the Bernie McGann Trio featuring Barry Harris; 1 track with the Bernie McGann Trio (Suburu)
- 1993: Beyond El-Rocco 1 track with the Bernie McGann Trio; 1 track w. the Bernie McGann Quartet (Vox Australia)
- 1994: Tall Stories as leader of Ten Part Invention (Rufus)
- 1995: McGann x McGann Bernie McGann Trio + James Greening; ARIA Winner (Rufus) (USA release Terra Nova)
- 1995: Bodgie Dada 1 track with The Last Straw; 1 track w. Ten Part Invention (ABC)
- 1996: Full Steam Ahead as co-leader of The Engine Room; ARIA nominated (ABC)
- 1996: Playground Bernie McGann Trio + Sandy Evans; ARIA winner) (Rufus) (USA release Terra Nova)
- 1996: The Arrival Joe 'BeBop' Lane 2 live tracks w. McGann, Dale Barlow, Bob Gebert (Spiral Scratch)
- 1997: Ugly Beauty Bernie McGann Trio; re-release on new label (Rufus)
- 1998: Rent Party Susan Gai Dowling with the Bernie McGann Trio + David Levy (Rufus)
- 1999: The 1987 Quartet Bernie McGann Quartet; re-release as CD (KINDRED SPIRITS) (Rufus)
- 2000: Bundeena Bernie McGann Trio; ARIA Winner (Rufus)
- 2000: Unidentified Spaces as Leader – Ten Part Invention (Rufus)
- 2002: Where's Love Gone Susan Gai Dowling with Bernie McGann (Newmarket)
- 2002: Wangaratta Live 1 track duet with John Pochee and Elliott Dalgleish; 1 track Bernie McGann Trio (Jazz Head)
- 2005: McGann Live at Side-On Bernie McGann Quartet (Rufus)
- 2005: Ten Part Invention Live at Wangaratta as Leader – Ten Part Invention (ABC)
- 2005: Blues For Pablo Too Bernie McGann Quartet (Rufus)
- 2006: Colours Judy Bailey Quartet; re-release as CD (Birdland)
- 2009: Solar Bernie McGann Quartet with Warwick Alder & Roger Manins double album live at The Sound Lounge; rec. 2006 (Rufus)
- 2010: Ten Part Invention re-release with new notes as leader (ABC)
- 2010: Double Dutch Bernie McGann Quartet; double album recorded live at the Bimhaus, Amsterdam; rec 2004 (Rufus)
- 2012: Wending Bernie McGann Quartet; ARIA-nominated double album (Rufus)
- rec.1999: forthcoming release Steve Lacy with The Engine Room live at the Basement, Sydney; as co-leader with Roger Frampton
