= Phil Treloar =

Australian jazz drummer, percussionist and composer

Phillip Maurice Treloar (born 7 December 1946, Sydney) is an Australian jazz drummer, percussionist and composer. In an extensive career devoted to creative pursuit Treloar has addressed himself to the problems of relationship found at the intersection of notated music-composition and improvisation. In 1987 Treloar coined the term, Collective Autonomy, to signify his endeavor in this field of work. Fundamental in this has been composition- and performance-development projects, with these at times involving electronic media. Collaborations have, and continue to be, crucial.

== Biography ==
Phil Treloar was born in Sydney on 7 December 1946. He commenced his musical career in the late 1960s, playing drums with various groups at local Sydney venues and in the early 1970s was very active in the Australian jazz scene, playing with musicians such as Alan Lee, with Roger Frampton and Barry Guy, Erroll Buddle, Judy Bailey, and Bernie McGann, then worked with Frampton again in the Intersection group in 1984, which toured Asia. During the first half of the 1970s he was also a member of the Jazz Co-Op, along with Roger Frampton (piano and saxes), Howie Smith (saxes), and Jack Thorncraft (bass). The Jazz Co-op was one of the most influential jazz units in Sydney during the 70s, and worked at major venues such as The Sydney Opera House, Sydney Town Hall and played to packed houses at over 30 engagements at Sydney's premier jazz club at that time, The Basement. In 1980 Treloar performed with the Bruce Cale Quartet with Bruce Cale (bass) Roger Frampton (piano and saxes) and Dale Barlow (saxes). Two live concerts by this group have been recorded, The Bruce Cale Quartet Live (Adelaide concert) and On Fire – The Sydney Concert.

Under the guidance of Dr. Graham Hair he received the B.Mus. degree, composition major, from the Sydney Conservatorium of Music, 1988. He has also studied in New York, USA, with renowned jazz drummer, Billy Hart, 1980; in Delhi, India, at Gandharva Mahavidyalaya with the Khayal vocalist, Madhup Mudgalaya, 1984; and in Colombo, Sri Lanka, at the Institute of Aesthetic Studies, with Piasara Silpadipathi, 1984.

Treloar held a lecturer's position at La Trobe University teaching composition, performance, and music theory, 1989–90. He has fulfilled composer residencies and guest lectureships at NSW State Conservatory of Music, Victoria College of the Arts (VCA), Perth Conservatory, Conservatorium of Tasmania, and Hobart College of the Arts.

In the areas of jazz and improvised music Treloar has shared in creative partnerships with musicians such as: Roger Frampton, Mark Simmonds, Steve Elphick, Jack Thorncraft, David Ades, Bruce Cale, Carl Dewhurst, Bernie McGann, Simone De Haan, Daryl Pratt, Hamish Stuart, Peter boothman, Chuck Yates, Bobbie Gebert, Mike Nock, Dale Barlow, Michele Morgan, Scott Tinkler, Errol Buddle, Judy Bailey, John Clare. International artists include Barry Guy, David Baker, Chico Freeman, Howie Smith, David Friesen, Ricky Ford, Chip Jackson, and The World Drum Ensemble. He led his own groups in the 1980s, including Expansions (1981–82) and Feeling to Thought (1987–89).

Among composer commissions and premiere performances are: Gabor Reeves, Ron Reaves, Steve Reaves, Ros Dunlop, David Miller, Julia Ryder, Simone DeHaan, Christian Wojtowicz, Michael Kieran Harvey, Geoff Dodd, Mardi McSullea, Mike Nock, Hamish Stuart, Graeme Leak, Daryl Pratt, Tom O'Kelly, Pipeline Contemporary Music Project, The Astra Choir, Synergy Percussion, Victorian College of the Arts, Australian Broadcasting Corporation, the University of Tasmania Conservatorium, Miki KIDO, Shunsuke Omura, Takashi Yamane, Hisae Kido, Junko Kamishima, Sotoko Hiramatsu, Eri Yoshimura, Kimiko Sunakawa.

In the 1988 Australian Bicentennial New Directions concert series a complete program was devoted to Treloar's work. Many of his compositions have been recorded and broadcast, particularly by the ABC. In addition to vinyl records and CDs his work has been featured in radio and film documentaries, the 4 x 1hr. Intersections (ABC radio) and Beyond El Rocco (film) are representative. In more recent years Treloar's work has been performed in the Sydney Opera House and at the international Wangaratta Festival of Jazz. Throughout his career Treloar's thoughts and concepts regarding creative musical expression have been accounted for in various publications: Nation Review, The Sydney Morning Herald, East West Arts, Jazz, Sounds Australian, The Mercury, 24 Hours, etc.

He moved to Kanazawa, Japan in 1992 where his two-hour work, Zen's Way: Through the Eye of Gogo-an – homage to Ryokan, received its world premiere performance in Kanazawa, 2004. Phil also presents solo percussion recitals and to date two of these have been published as CDs. On occasions he has been invited by the Japan Poets' Association to perform improvised music together with poetry readings. A major event inspired by the poetry of Matsuo Bashō, October 2005, and for which Treloar provided the music, is indicative of the creative interaction he shares with the Japanese tradition. Facing East, a performance initiative inaugurated by Phil in 2005 and based in Kanazawa, presents occasional concerts. These have premiered several new works written by Treloar and for which Australian, together with Japanese artists, have been invited to participate. Stemming from this initiative, Converging Paths, a collaboration with the Australian percussionist, Hamish Stuart, has, to date, generated a three-CD series. Phil's lifelong project, Collective Autonomy, continues to engage him with research. In a nutshell, Collective Autonomy explores the intersection between improvised and composed/notated music-making. It provides a space wherein individuals' concerns and abilities to enter into creative discourse might be enabled, and specifically, where the notion of interdependence is wholeheartedly embraced.

== Selected discography ==
- Pathways of the Mind: exploring sympathetic resonance – (second series) Phil Treloar solo percussion recital ( August 2005 ) (Feeling to Thought, FT-002, 2006)
- Pathways of the Mind: exploring sympathetic resonance – (first series) Phil Treloar solo percussion recital ( August 2006 )(Feeling to Thought, FT-001, 2006)
- On Fire – The Sydney Concert (Bruce Cale Quartet) (Tall Poppies Records)
- Bruce Cale Quartet Live – Adelaide Festival 1980 (Tall Poppies Records, TP175, 2004)
- In the Pipeline – Simone deHaan, Daryl Pratt, Phil Treloar (Tall Poppies Records, TP095, 1996)
- (...and then) SUNRISE – Tom O'Kelly, solo percussion (Victor, vicc-80, 1992)
- Jazz Co/Op (Philips (vinyl), 6641 225, 1974)
- Pathways of the Mind – second series DVD (the complete concert)(Feeling to Thought)
