= Camco Drum Company =

Brand of musical instruments

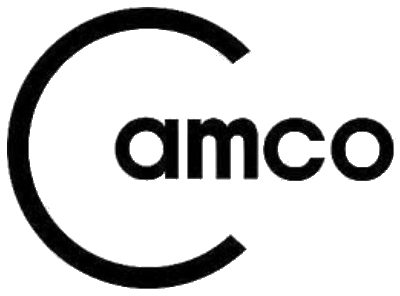
- Company type: Private (1961–77); Brand (1977–present)
- Industry: Musical instruments
- Predecessor: George H. Way Co.
- Founded: 1961
- Defunct: 1977; 49 years ago
- Fate: Company defunct; rights to name acquired by Hoshino Gakki
- Headquarters: Nagoya, Japan
- Products: Drum kits and hardware
- Owner: Hoshino Gakki

The Camco Drum Company is a musical instrument brand currently owned by Japanese company Hoshino Gakki. Camco was originally a drum hardware manufacturing company which began producing drums after a hostile takeover of the George H. Way drum company in 1961. Camco was active until its closure in 1977, with its assets purchased by Drum Workshop while Hoshino Gakki took over rights over the Camco name.

== History ==
During its roughly 17-year history, the company had three locations: Oak Lawn, Illinois, from 1961 until 1971; Chanute, Kansas (when they were briefly owned by Kustom) from 1971 till 1973; and finally Los Angeles until 1977/78 and the company's demise. The drums were easily identified by George Way's distinctive round lug design and the so-called "cloud" badge, which was used throughout the company's history, except for a two-year period (roughly from 1969 to 1971) when an oval badge was sometimes used.

In the 1960s, unlike the major American drum companies like Ludwig, Gretsch, Rogers, and Slingerland, Camco almost entirely missed the rock music wave, picking up only a small handful of high-profile rock players like Dennis Wilson of the Beach Boys and Doug Clifford of Creedence Clearwater Revival. This lapse meant the brand laboured under a slightly old-fashioned image and almost certainly sowed the seeds for its later demise.

As the company was attracting predominantly endorsers from a jazz background such as Tijuana Brass' Nick Ceroli, much of the company's output during the 1960s tended towards four- or five-piece kits in comparatively small sizes, in marked contrast to their competitors, who were marketing kits of multiple drums in bigger sizes to compete with the huge increase in rock-band amplification.

Camco drum shells during the Oak Lawn era and until 1965 utilized 4-ply shells with 4-ply glue rings. Camco switched to producing 6-ply Jasper-made shells with 6-ply glue rings in 1965, which continued through the Chanute years. When the catalog came out in 1965, it stated the 4-ply shells would be relegated to the student drums and the Aristocrats would utilize the new 6-ply shells. When Camco moved to Los Angeles, the company changed shell manufacturers to Keller and opted for the same 6/6-ply construction. They also changed the bearing edges to a sharper peak in the center of the shell to increase projection. Though quite different in sound, both periods have their fans. Most collectors tend to lean towards the Oak Lawn period, specifically the early 4-ply shells (and to an extent the Oak Lawn and Chanute 6/6-ply shelled drums). Pre-LA the drums would have white-painted interiors if there was a plastic-wrapped exterior, and a clear lacquered interior if the outer was a stain or lacquer finish. LA shells always had clear lacquered interiors regardless of their exterior finish.

The legendary Jim Gordon, who played as a top session drummer during the late 1960s and early 1970s period (with John Lennon, George Harrison, Steve Winwood's Traffic, Eric Clapton's Derek & the Dominos, Carly Simon, Frank Zappa, Jackson Browne, and a large number of high-level musicians and projects), used to play a Walnut Stain finish Camco drum kit, as did Mike Botts (Bread). Greg "Duke" Dewey, drummer for Country Joe and the Fish, played a Walnut Stain finish Camco drum kit at the Woodstock Music Festival in 1969. The late Phil "Philthy Animal" Taylor of Motörhead used Camco drums on their major, breakthrough song "Ace of Spades" among other tunes. They sold at a Bonhams auction for £18,750, far exceeding the estimate of £7,000.

During the 1970s, the new design LA Camco drums became the studio drum of choice for many, particularly on the US west coast with session advocates like Jeff Porcaro, and, with some efforts being made at export, even made an impression on the British and European scenes with players like Dave Mattacks (Fairport Convention, session musician) and Bob Henrit (Argent, The Kinks), and in Australia with players like Warren Daly of the jazz ensemble Daly-Wilson Big Band.

In the 1975 Alice Cooper concert film Welcome To My Nightmare, Alice's Finnish-born drummer Pentti "Whitey" Glan plays a white-lacquer-finish double-bass "Los Angeles"-era Camco drum kit. This set was interesting as both bass drums were set up horizontally, like floor toms. The finish became known as "Alice Cooper White".

In 1977, Drum Workshop (DW) and Hoshino Gakki (the parent company of Tama Drums) jointly purchased Camco's assets. DW would receive Camco's inventory and manufacturing equipment, while Tama would receive the Camco name, the original design blueprints, and engineering rights.

Tama briefly used the Camco name in the late 1970s for so-called Tama/Camco drum kits, which varied between US-made Camco shells and sometimes Japanese-made shells with a rounded lug similar to, though not the same as, the Camco lugs. They also produced, more famously, a "Camco by Tama" bass drum pedal which utilised Frank Ippolito's modified-Camco chain pedal drive, and this design has since become an industry standard for most bass drum pedals. Tama re-issued the now classic pedal in 2011. Drum Workshop adopted George Way's original round lug design with virtually no change and uses the iconic lugs to this day.

Camco drums are now highly attractive to collectors and players alike and achieve some of the highest prices in the vintage drum market. Even now, decades after the company closed, some contemporary musicians, like highly rated jazz player Jeff Ballard, British session player Chris Whitten, and Jeremy Stacey continue to use vintage Camco kits. Jeremy Stacey played his Alice Cooper White LA-era kit on Jimmy Kimmel Live! with Benmont Tench after recording their LP and going on tour with them.

In 2007 Ronn Dunnett (Dunnett Classic Drums) purchased the rights to the George Way trademark and produced drums under that brand until 2025. Those drums closely resemble the visual and sonic qualities of the original George Way drums and have received very good reviews. He then sold the rights to the George Way trademark to Drum Workshop in the summer of 2025.
