= Chesbro Music Company =

Coordinates: 43°29′28.2″N 112°02′26.6″W

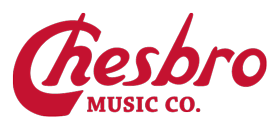

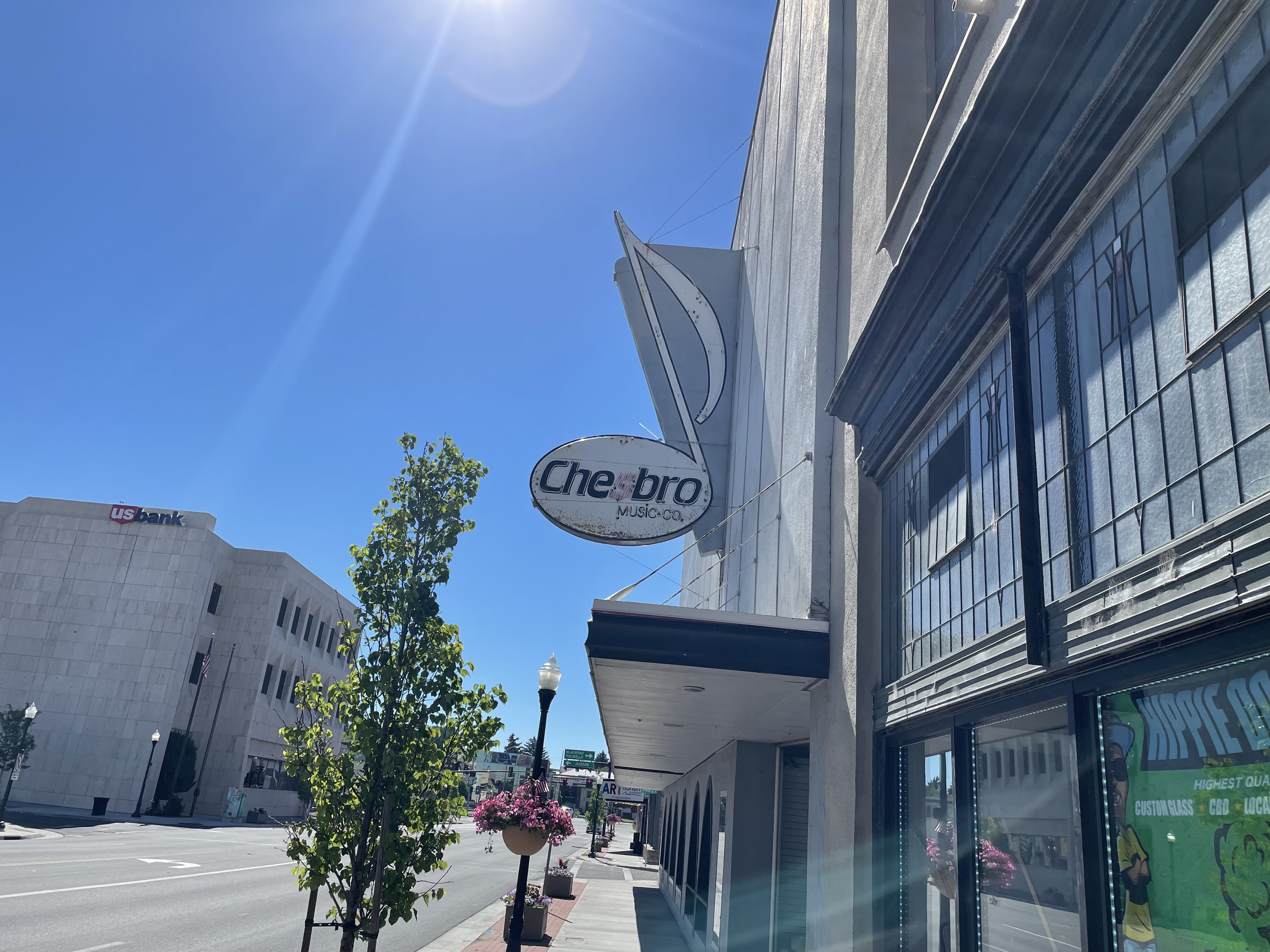
- Chesbro Music Company from the building sidewalk
- Type: Privately held company
- Industry: Musical instrument manufacturing, wholesale
- Founded: 1911; 115 years ago
- Founder: Horace Chesbro
- Headquarters: Idaho Falls, Idaho, United States
- Products: Musical Instruments, Accessories, Sheet Music
- Brands: Teton Guitars
- Number of employees: 75 (2019)
- Website: chesbroretail.com tetonguitars.com

Chesbro Music Company is a privately owned American manufacturer and wholesaler of musical instruments, musical instrument accessories and sheet music. Chesbro Music was founded in 1911 and is based in Idaho Falls, Idaho. Chesbro owns Teton Guitars, and has been run by female CEOs since 1953.

== Early history ==
Horace Chesbro, an 1897 violin studies graduate of the Northern Indiana Normal School in Valparaiso, Indiana, and his brother, Harry, began Chesbro Music Company in a storefront in Idaho Falls, Idaho in 1911. Having manufactured upright pianos in Seattle, Washington, they continued selling pianos and delivered them via horse-drawn wagon to rural Idaho communities.

In 1925, Horace Chesbro started school band programs before public schools began funding and staffing their own music programs. A year later, Chesbro Music was the first to introduce the rural Northwest to recorded music with the wind-up Edison Chippendale Console Disc Phonograph. From the success of selling phonographs, the Chesbro Music Co. began building a three-story addition onto their storefront in Idaho Falls in June 1927. Through the Great Depression, Chesbro Music continued operation by honoring debt or credit with trade and housing employees in-store. By the late 1930s, Chesbro Music began offering jobbing (wholesale) franchises. Billboard reported that Chesbro Music was among the top 20 sheet music jobbers in 1944. Horace's son, Henry Chesbro, took over Chesbro Music Company as president in 1945 and began nationally wholesaling newly introduced LP records.

== Female CEOs and Wholesale Expansion ==
In 1953, 70-year-old Ella Chesbro, Henry's mother, assumed management of the company due to the death of Henry Chesbro in a plane accident. Ella expanded jobbing franchises to include independent dealers who sold displays of stock music and folios. Five years later, to accommodate wholesale growth, Chesbro Music expanded their original 1911 store front to a 60,000 square foot warehouse and added a modern facade. Music industry executives and civic officials attended a ribbon-cutting in 1961 in the new building marking the company's 50-year anniversary. Then, with a Stanford degree in economics, 37-year-old Joan Chesbro Griggs, the company's second female CEO, took the reins from her grandmother in 1969. That year, Chesbro Music began attending the NAMM Show in Anaheim, California with a display of their wholesale business and print music library.

Having met Junpei Hoshino, president of Hoshino Gakki, at the 1972 NAMM Show, Joan entered Chesbro Music into a Western United States distributorship of Tama Drums and Ibanez Guitars with Hoshino USA in 1973. She and Gary Bennett, a top tenured employee, then helped Tama and Ibanez gain domestic popularity over the next four decades. By the mid-1980s, Chesbro had enlisted membership in the Music Distributors Association (MDA) and was labeled the second largest distributor of sheet music in the United States. In 1999, daughters Vanetta Chesbro Wilson and Tana Jane Stahn, took on co-ownership of Chesbro Music. Distributing the Ibanez brand during the next decade contributed to Chesbro's growth through the 2000s. In 2007, Chesbro Music Wholesale was recognized in the industry as one of the 36 "dealer friendly" companies. In 2008, Gary Bennett was recognized for his nearly 35-year contribution to the music industry with a nomination by The Music & Sound Retailer as Representative of the Year. The partnership between Chesbro Music and Hoshino Gakki ended in 2009.

During the transition, the sisters targeted their wholesale business to independent music dealers. In 2010, Chesbro Music Co. introduced Teton Guitars, a brand of acoustic guitars manufactured in China and named after a prominent mountain range near Chesbro Music Company headquarters. That same year Chesbro Music remained on The Music Trades magazine's list of largest companies in the music industry, ranked by sales, in the U.S. The 2010 NAMM Show History Program also noted that Chesbro had "become one of the largest music wholesalers in the country".

In 2011, Chesbro Music Company marked its 100-year anniversary with an open house for local community, civic leaders, and employees. This anniversary was noted by industry trade magazines and Chesbro was given a citation of distinction at the 2011 NAMM Show.

Vanetta died November 2013, leaving her sister, Tana, to run the "Top 100" company. In 2015 and 2017, industry trade magazines listed Chesbro Music as one of the top 100 leading suppliers in the music industry. 2018 marked the 65th anniversary of a woman CEO running Chesbro Music.

Chesbro Music Company acquired SHS International, a U.S.-based audio company, in late 2019.

== Proprietary Brands ==
- Teton Guitars, Ukuleles, and Accessories
- Tanara® Acoustic and Electric Guitars
- Eddy Finn Ukuleles
- SHS International
- Morgan Monroe & Rocky Top (Blue Grass Instruments)
- Indiana Guitars
- Stage Mate (Stands)
- Tune Tech Tuners
- Stone Cases
- Harmony Jewelry by Future Primitive. Licensed musical replicas include instruments from Fender, Gibson, Martin, and Rickenbacker.
