= Hoshino Gakki =

Japanese manufacturer of musical instruments

Coordinates: 35°10′48.9″N 136°55′5.6″E

Hoshino Gakki Co., Ltd.
- Native name: 星野楽器
- Type: Kabushiki gaisha
- Industry: Musical instruments
- Founded: 1908 in Nagoya, Japan
- Founder: Matsujiro Hoshino
- Headquarters: Nagoya, Japan: (Main HQ) Bensalem, PA, United States: (US HQ)
- Area served: Worldwide
- Products: List: Electric, acoustic, resonator & classical guitars; Electric & acoustic bass guitars; Amplifiers; Ukuleles; Banjos; Mandolins; Effects units; Drum kits; Hardware; Tenor drums; Snare drums
- Brands: Ibanez; Tama Drums
- Website: hoshinogakki.co.jp

Hoshino Gakki Co., Ltd. (星野楽器株式会社, Hoshino Gakki Kabushiki gaisha; lit. Hoshino Musical Instruments) is a Japanese manufacturer of musical instruments. It is the owner of the Ibanez guitar and Tama drum brand names.

== History ==
The Hoshino company was founded in 1908 by Matsujiro Hoshino originally as the Hoshino Shoten bookstore which mostly sold books and sheet music and then gradually over the years also began to import musical instruments into Japan. Matsujiro was succeeded by Yoshitaro Hoshino. Beginning in 1929, Hoshino imported Spanish guitars of Salvador Ibáñez e Hijos of Valencia, which was bought in 1933 by Telesforo Julve, also from Valencia. In 1935, Hoshino began manufacturing their own stringed instruments, using the name Ibanez Salvador, later shortened as "Ibanez". The company had little presence in the Western world until the mid-1960s.

In 1957 Hoshino Gakki manufactured what would be considered the first of the modern era Ibanez guitars. In 1962, Junpei Hoshino, Yoshitaro's son, opened the Tama Seisakusho factory to manufacture electric guitars and amplifiers. The Tama Seisakusho factory produced a line of guitars that included clones of several popular guitars, including the Martin Dreadnought. At the time they were also manufacturing Star Drums, available in either the Imperial or Royal models.

Hoshino Gakki stopped making guitars at the Tama Seisakusho factory in 1966 (but continued making drums) and from then on contracted outside guitar factories, which in the mid 1960s mainly consisted of Guyatone. Beginning in the 1970s guitars were almost exclusively manufactured by FujiGen which remains one of the main sources for Japanese Ibanez guitars.

== Timeline ==
- 1908: The Hoshino Shoten bookstore company is founded by Matsujiro Hoshino. Originally selling books and sheet music they gradually start to import musical instruments.
- 1929: The Hoshino company starts Hoshino Gakki Ten Inc. and starts to import Salvador Ibáñez acoustic guitars from Spain.
- 1935: Hoshino Gakki Ten begins their own production of "Ibanez Salvador" branded Spanish guitars.
- 1945: The Hoshino Gakki Ten factory was destroyed by World War II bombing.
- 1955: Hoshino Gakki Ten builds new headquarters in Nagoya, Japan and becomes an export only business.
- 1957: Hoshino Gakki Ten starts making the first modern era Ibanez branded guitars.
- 1962: Hoshino Gakki Ten opens the Tama Seisakusho factory.
- 1966: Hoshino Gakki Ten starts to use outside manufacturers for guitars and amplifiers, but continues to manufacture drums themselves.
- 1969: Hoshino Gakki Ten starts to use the FujiGen Gakki guitar factory to make most of the Ibanez branded guitars. The headstock logo on Ibanez guitars is changed from a metal logo to a more modern decal logo.
- 1971: Hoshino Gakki Ten starts a U.S. distribution channel named Elger, in Bensalem Township, Pennsylvania, near Philadelphia
- 1972: Hoshino Gakki Ten launches its own line of Ibanez effect pedals. The Ibanez effect pedals were licensed from the Nisshin Onpa Company, who own the Maxon brand.
- 1973: Hoshino Gakki partners with Chesbro Music Company to distribute Ibanez and Tama to Western U.S.
- 1974: The Tama brand name is used for the drums produced by Hoshino Gakki Ten.
- 1975: The Artist range with original guitar designs by Hoshino Gakki Ten (Ibanez), Kanda Shokai (Greco) and FujiGen Gakki is launched.
- 1980: The Elger name is changed to Hoshino USA Inc.
- 1981: Hoshino changes company name from Hoshino Gakki Ten to Hoshino Gakki and starts Hoshino Gakki Mfg (based on TAMA Seisakusho).
- 1982: Hoshino Gakki starts Hoshino Gakki Hanbai for the Japanese domestic market.
- 1987: Hoshino Gakki starts Hoshino Los Angeles office.
- Late 1980s: Hoshino Gakki starts using Korean guitar manufactures as well as Japanese guitar manufactures, and in later years also uses Chinese and Indonesian guitar manufacturers.
- 1990: Hoshino Gakki starts Hoshino (U.S.A.) Los Angeles Branch.
- 2005: Hoshino Gakki starts Qingdao Representative Office in China.
- 2009: Hoshino Gakki ends partnership with Chesbro Music Company, and takes on sole U.S. distributorship.

== See also ==
Brands

- Camco
- Cimar
- Ibanez
- Matao
- Penco
- Tama

Historical suppliers

- Salvador Ibáñez
- Guyatone
- Kiso Suzuki Violin
- FujiGen
- Maxon

== Bibliography ==
- Hoshino Gakki History
- Telesforo Julve
