= The Last Straw (band) =

Australian jazz ensemble

- Origin: Australia
- Genres: Jazz
- Years active: 1974–1999
- Past members: John Pochée; Bernie McGann; Lloyd Swanton; Ken James; Jack Thorncraft; Dave Levy; Tony Esterman; Ron Philpott; David Seidel

The Last Straw is an Australian jazz ensemble formed in 1974. They won the 1991 ARIA Award for Best Jazz Album for their self-titled album.

== Members ==
- John Pochée – drums
- Bernie McGann – alto saxophone
- Ken James – tenor saxophone
- Jack Thorncraft – bass
- Dave Levy – piano
- Tony Esterman – piano
- Ron Philpott – bass
- Lloyd Swanton – bass
- David Seidel – bass

== Discography ==
=== Albums ===
List of albums, with selected details
Title	Details
The Last Straw	Released: 1990; Format: LP; Label: Spiral Scratch

== Awards and nominations ==
=== ARIA Music Awards ===
The ARIA Music Awards is an annual awards ceremony that recognises excellence, innovation, and achievement across all genres of Australian music. They commenced in 1987.

Year	Nominee / work	Award	Result	Ref.
1991	The Last Straw	Best Jazz Album	Won	
