= The Engine Room =

Australian jazz trio

- Members: Roger Frampton; John Pochee; Steve Elphick

The Engine Room is an Australian jazz trio made up of Roger Frampton, John Pochee and Steve Elphick who were the rhythm section of Ten Part Invention. Their album Full Steam Ahead was nominated for the 1996 ARIA Award for Best Jazz Album.

== Members ==
- Roger Frampton - piano
- John Pochee - drums
- Steve Elphick - bass

== Discography ==
List of albums, with selected details
Title	Details
Full Steam Ahead	Released: 1996; Format: CD; Label: ABC Music

== Awards and nominations ==
=== ARIA Music Awards ===
The ARIA Music Awards is an annual awards ceremony that recognises excellence, innovation, and achievement across all genres of Australian music. They commenced in 1987.

Year	Nominee / work	Award	Result	Ref.
1996	Full Steam Ahead	Best Jazz Album	Nominated	
