= Chris Qua =

Australian jazz musician (1951–2023)

Chris Qua (14 November 1951 – 30 April 2023), nicknamed "Smedley", was an Australian jazz musician, remembered as flugelhorn and double bass player with the band Galapagos Duck.

== History ==
Qua was born in Orange, New South Wales, the elder son of Pat and Jack Qua, both schoolteachers and jazz enthusiasts. In the late 1950s the family moved to a big house in Ashfield, Sydney, which became a meeting place for musicians and jazz lovers, and an informal venue for improvised music. The Qua family was involved in the University of Sydney jazz scene and were prominent participants at the annual Australian Jazz Conventions commencing with the 1955 function at Cootamundra. With some guidance from Geoff Bull, Qua took up the trumpet and, later, the double bass, gaining inspiration from the work of Ray Brown of the Oscar Peterson trio.

He became a member of a Dixieland jazz band playing in Sydney's bohemian Newtown pub scene, and in 1969 at the ski chalet, Charlotte Pass, Mount Kosciuszko. It was there he met Tom Hare and Marty Mooney, and together founded Galapagos Duck, famously named by Spike Milligan, who enjoyed their music. In 1973 they were closely involved with Bruce Viles in founding "The Basement", for years Sydney's premier jazz venue, becoming the house band. They were eminently versatile — Des Windsor on piano and organ, Marty Mooney and Tom Hare on reeds, and Qua on double bass and brass, notably flugelhorn. Qua left in 1980, joining the Daly-Wilson Big Band, and assisted on John Sangster's various projects. He played in Su Cruickshank's band at the Sydney Brasserie in Barrack Street, Sydney.

In 2000 Qua suffered his first stroke, leaving his left side paralysed and ending his musical career. Successive strokes destroyed his short-term memory and after the last one in 2014 he required permanent residential care at an aged care facility in Paddington. He died in the Sacred Heart Hospice after being diagnosed with inoperable bowel and colon cancer. Tributes were paid by musicians Dale Barlow among others.

== Family ==
Qua married Tessa in 1990 after a long love affair; she cared for him after his stroke.

His younger brother Willie was also a musician; he joined Galapagos Duck in 1973, playing reeds and drums.
