= Garry Greenwood =

Australian sculptor

Garry Greenwood (born 1943 in Kent, England – 2005) was a Tasmanian leather sculptor and graphic artist. He pioneered and mastered the use of leather as a sculptural material, using it to create musical instruments, theatrical costumes, wall hangings and free-standing works. His works are widely represented in public and private collections in Australia and internationally.

== Works ==
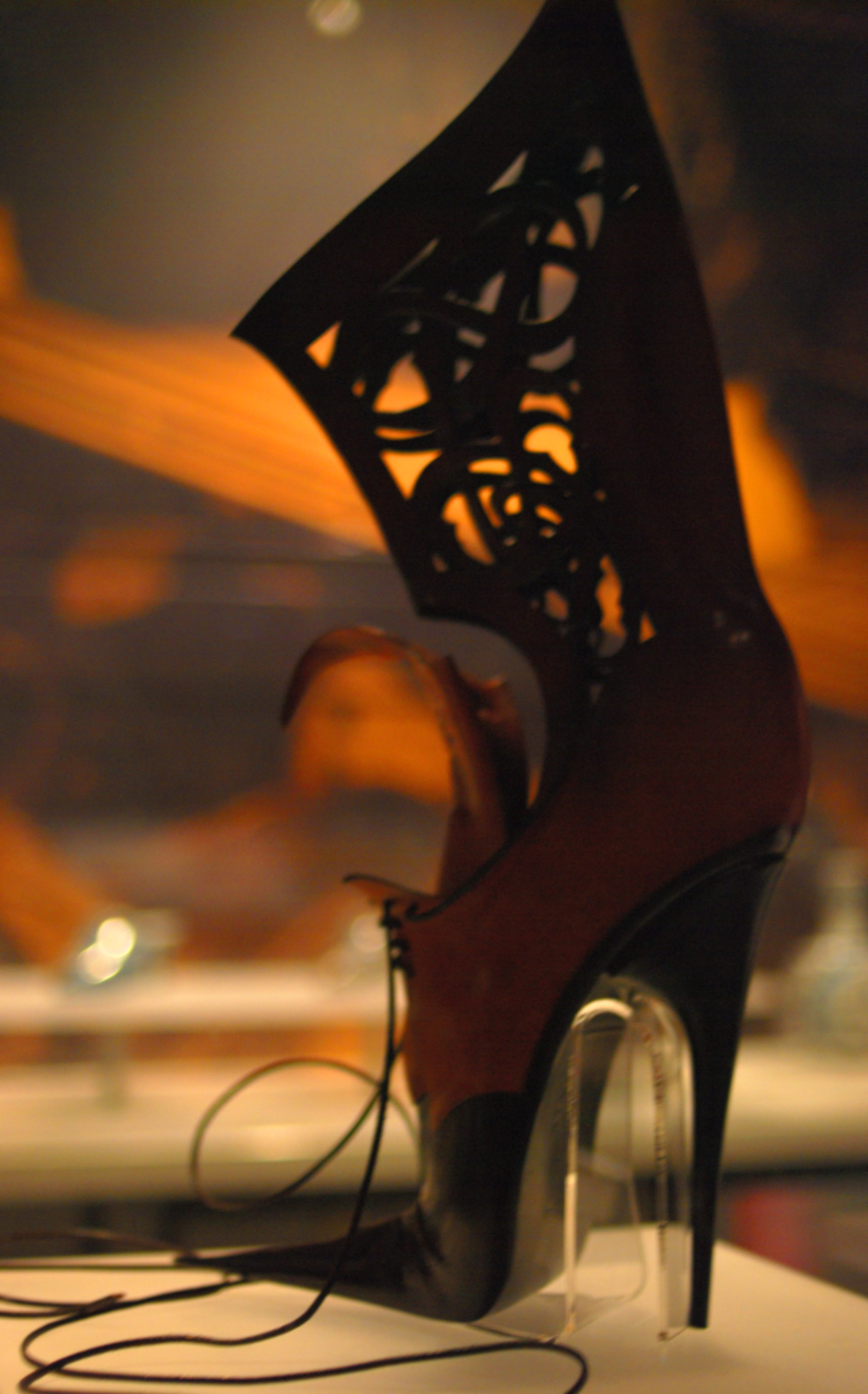
Leather Sculpture by Garry Greenwood

Greenwood is considered a pioneer in the use of leather as a sculptural medium. He used wet-formed cowhide as well as exotic leathers including kangaroo, buffalo, emu and ostrich. Stylistically his works were often whimsical and quirky, drawing on folk art and English medievalist fantasy, as well as organic and human forms. A long-running series of Greenwood's works were elaborate and ornate shoes, a number which are on display at the Bata Shoe Museum in Toronto.

He collaborated with a number of theatre groups including TasDance, for which he designed sets, costumes, puppets and masks.

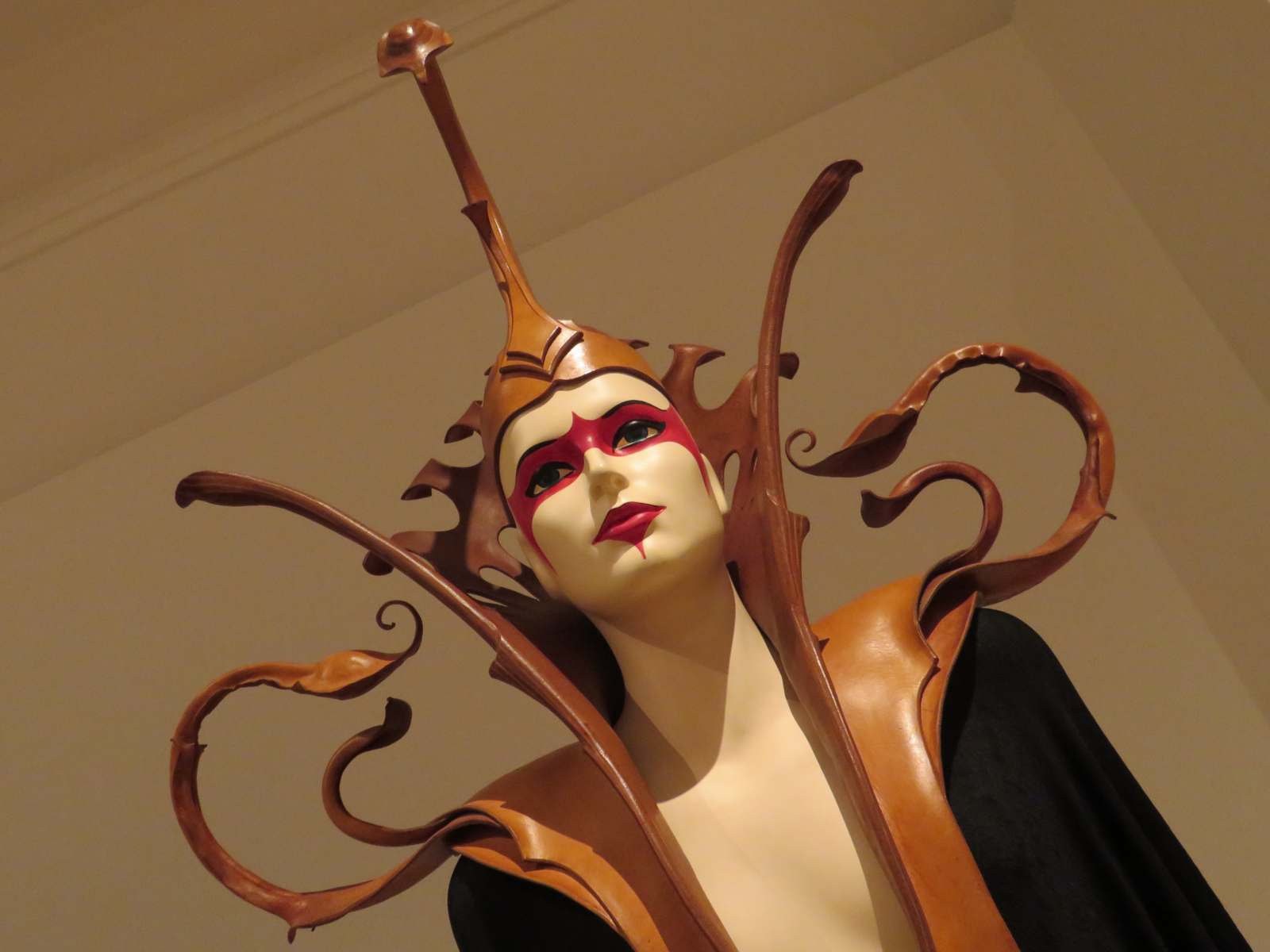
Praxis - Leather Costume for TasDance Skin Deep

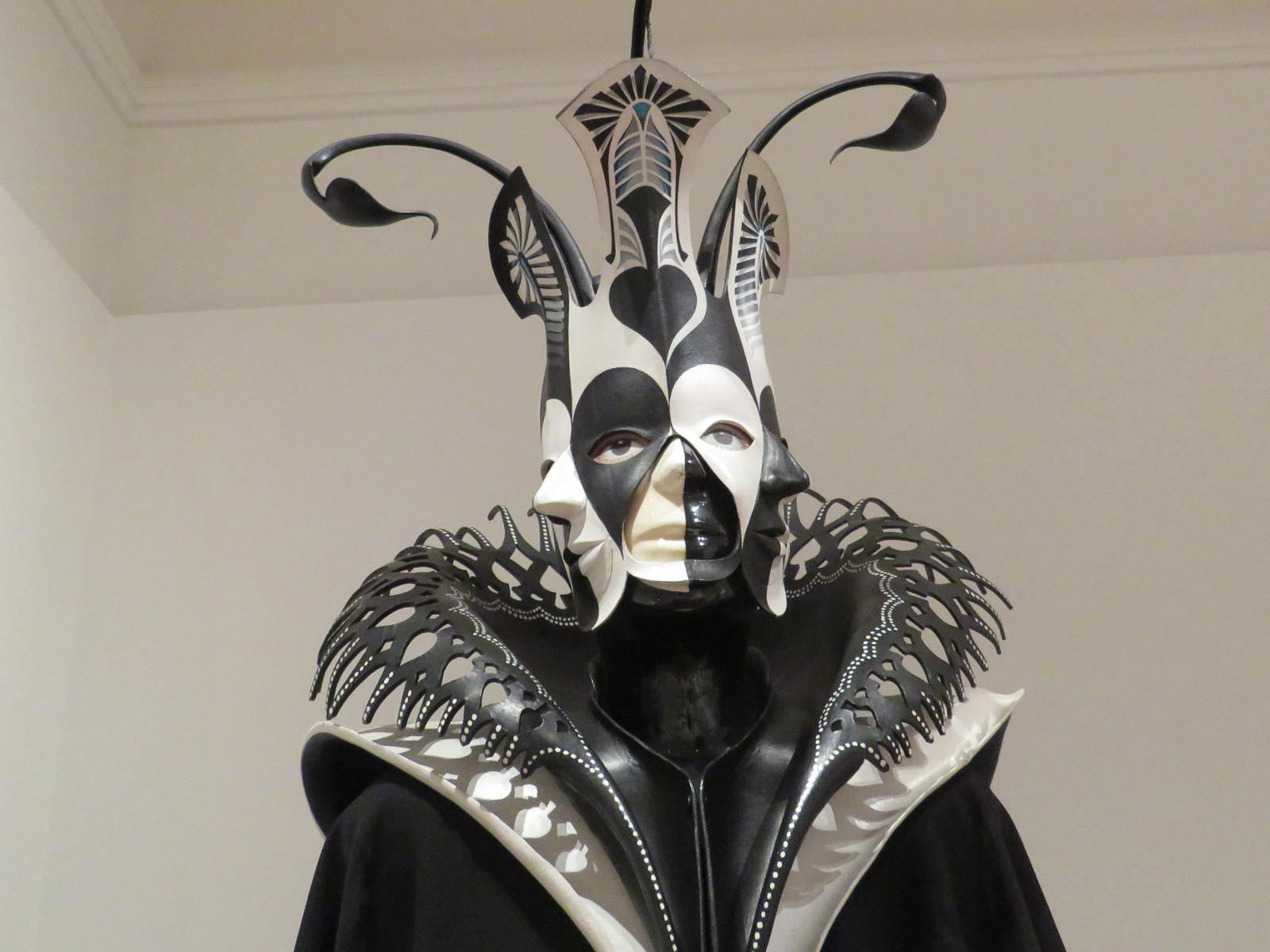
Ace of Spades - Leather Costume for TasDance Skin Deep

Significant collections of his works are held at the National Gallery of Australia, the Queen Victoria Museum and Art Gallery and the Grainger Museum.

=== Musical instruments ===
Greenwood is best known for creating musical instruments from leather. A talented folk musician himself (guitar, mandolin & banjo), his first experiment was a leather violin. He went on to create dozens of different instruments including stringed, woodwind and percussion instruments. While some of them are decorative variations of existing instrument forms such as harps, lyres, horns and ocarinas, some are entirely new inventions such as the Tasmanian Mountain Harp. He also collaborated with Joanne Cannon & Stuart Favilla to create hybrid acoustic/electronic instruments, the Leather LightHarp and the Contra-monster. His instruments have also been played by saxophonist Brian Brown, and Tasmanian group The Chordwainers.

== Life ==
Greenwood studied Art and Design at Reigate School of Art in Surrey, England. He immigrated to Australia in 1962, establishing himself as a graphic designer. In 1972 he moved to Deloraine, Tasmania where he converted Bowerbank Mill into a craft gallery and studio. He later established his home and studio on Mount Barrow, near Launceston. Between 1985 and 1989 he was the head of the Leather Workshop at the Canberra School of Art. He had 26 solo exhibitions, in Australia and internationally. His contribution to the arts was recognised in the Australia Day honours of 2005, shortly before his death.
