= Roger Frampton =

Australian jazz pianist, saxophonist, composer and educator

Roger Frampton (20 May 1948 – 4 January 2000) was an Australian jazz pianist, saxophonist, composer, and educator. Based in Sydney, he played a major role in shaping the evolution of Australian jazz. He taught at the Jazz Studies course at the Sydney Conservatorium of Music, and also became Head of Jazz Studies during the late 1970s.

== Biography ==
Born in Portsmouth, England in 1948, Frampton began learning piano and saxophone at an early age and by the age of 15 he had formed his modern jazz group which played in local clubs, also performing with top English jazz musicians such as Don Rendel, Bill Le Sage, and Joe Harriott.

He migrated to Australia with his family in December 1966 and in the following year joined the experimental electronic music group Teletopa and also AZ Music, which performed the works of John Cage, Steve Reich, and others. Frampton toured overseas with Teletopa in 1972, playing in London at the International Carnival of Experimental Sound, at the Edinburgh Festival Fringe, and in Munich, Manila, Tokyo, Amsterdam, and Cambridge.

On returning to Australia, he formed a trio, the Jazz Co/op, along with Sydney drummer Phil Treloar and bassist Jack Thorncraft. In 1974 this trio was expanded to a quartet when joined by US saxophonist Howie Smith who was in Sydney for three years, setting up Australia’s first formal jazz course at the Sydney Conservatorium of Music.

The Jazz Co/op was in demand in Sydney over the following two years. It played over thirty engagements at Sydney’s major jazz club of that time, The Basement, as well as many other performances including the Musician’s Club, Sydney Town Hall, the Sydney Opera House, and the Conservatorium of Music. The band also recorded two albums for Horst Liepolt’s “44” record label.

Howie Smith returned to the USA in 1976 and the Jazz Co/op soon disbanded. Frampton continued to play jazz in Sydney in a variety of situations, both as a sideman and as leader of his groups. He formed the quartet “Intersection” in the early 1980s. This group included Phil Treloar on drums, Peter Boothman or Guy Strazzullo on guitar, and Lloyd Swanton or Steve Elphick on bass. Intersection performed regularly at Jenny’s Wine Bar appeared at concerts at the Australian Museum and the Manly Jazz Festival, and undertook a Musica Viva sponsored tour of India.

In 1980 he performed with the Bruce Cale Quartet with Dale Barlow (saxes) Bruce Cale (bass) and Phil Treloar (drums). Two live concerts by this group have been recorded, The Bruce Cale Quartet Live (Adelaide concert) and On Fire - The Sydney Concert. These recordings feature some of the best examples of Frampton's work as a pianist, saxophonist and composer.

In the late 1980s and during the 1990s, Frampton performed to critical acclaim with Ten Part Invention (touring Russia with that band), the trio The Engine Room with John Pochée and Steve Elphick, and with renowned US jazz musicians such as Don Rader, Steve Lacy and Lee Konitz. His work during this period, as a pianist, saxophonist and composer, has been extensively recorded, with a number of releases available on the Tall Poppies and ABC Classics labels. In 1991 he was awarded an APRA Award for jazz composition.

He was diagnosed with a brain tumour in 1999, but nevertheless continued to perform with various ensembles, and was awarded a Doctorate of Creative Arts from Wollongong University in 1999 for his thesis exploring co-relations between his composition and improvisation.

He participated in the 1999 Wangaratta Festival of Jazz, performing a concert of his own music with Ten Part Invention. Frampton died at home in January 2000 and was survived by his daughter Emily and partner Sherylene Robinson.

== Selected discography ==
- Jazz Co/op (44 Records)
- Jazz Co/op - Live at The Basement (44 Records)
- On Fire - The Sydney Concert (Bruce Cale Quartet) (Tall Poppies Records)
- Bruce Cale Quartet Live (Tall Poppies Records)
- Tall Stories – Ten Part Invention (Rufus Records)
- Jim McLeod's Jazz Tracks - Ten Part Invention (ABC Jazz)
- Full Steam Ahead – The Engine Room (ABC Jazz)
- Live at Wangaratta: The Music of Roger Frampton (ABC Jazz)
- Totally Prepared (Tall Poppies Records)
- Pure Piano (Tall Poppies Records)
- Off the Beaten Track (with Don Rader) (Tall Poppies Records)
