= Howie Smith =

American jazz musician

Howie Smith (born February 25, 1943), is a saxophonist, composer, jazz musician and educator

Howie Smith was born in Pottsville, Pennsylvania in 1943. He was an instructor for the University of Illinois Division of Music Extension from 1970 to 1973 and also taught at Northern Illinois University in 1971.

In 1973, under a Fulbright grant, he set up the first tertiary level jazz studies program in Australia at the New South Wales State Conservatorium (now named the Sydney Conservatorium of Music). He remained as Director of Jazz Studies through 1976, and was a member of the Australian group Jazz Co/op from 1974 through 1976.

Howie Smith is a full professor at Cleveland State University, has been a frequent performer with the Cleveland Orchestra and soloist with the Cleveland Chamber Symphony since 1982, and has presented numerous concerts and workshops throughout the United States, Canada, South America, Europe and Australia.

== Biography ==
Born in Pottsville, Pennsylvania in 1943; Howie Smith graduated from Reading Senior High School in 1961. Early studies with his first music teacher, J. Carl Borelli, included clarinet and saxophone pieces from the classical and jazz repertoire. At Mr. Borelli's urging Smith auditioned for and was offered a scholarship to attend Ithaca College as a clarinet major, and at age 22 he received a Bachelor of Science degree with a major in Music Education from Ithaca College, then going on to the University of Illinois where he received his master's degree in 1968 (also in Music Education).

Here he joined the University of Illinois Jazz Band, one of the most highly respected big bands in the USA at that time, touring eastern and western Europe with that band in 1968 as well as performing at the 1969 Newport Jazz Festival. As a freelance musician Smith composed and produced commercial jingles for radio and television between 1966 and 1972, and in the late 1960s and early 1970s toured with Elvis Presley, Glen Campbell, Bob Crosby, Warren Covington and Les Elgart, among others.

He was an instructor for the University of Illinois Division Of Music Extension from 1970 to 1973 teaching a course titled Jazz and Youth Music, designed primarily for public school teachers who were interested in initiating and/or expanding the use of jazz in the classroom. He was also an instructor at Northern Illinois University in 1971 teaching saxophone, improvisation and jazz composition-arranging.

In 1973 Howie Smith received a Fulbright grant (through the Australian-American Educational Foundation) to set up the first jazz studies program on a tertiary level in Australia at the New South Wales State Conservatorium, and he remained as Director of Jazz Studies through to 1976. Thirty four years since its establishment, Jazz Studies continues to be a most popular course at the Sydney Conservatorium.

From 1974 to 1976 he was a member of the Australian jazz group "Jazz Co-op", which included Roger Frampton (piano and saxes), Phil Treloar (drums) and Jack Thorncraft (bass). There was a very healthy jazz scene in Sydney during the 1970s and the Jazz Co-op were in demand, doing a number of performances at The Basement (Sydney's premier jazz club at that time), the Conservatorium of Music, the Musician's Club, Sydney Town Hall, and a number of the "Music Is An Open Sky" festivals that were presented by jazz producer Horst Liepolt.

While in Australia Howie Smith presented a series of concerts in the Sydney Opera House as one of the featured artists for Music Rostrum Australia's "Rostrum '75;" other featured artists were Luciano Berio, Cathy Berberian, Roger Woodward and Yuji Takahashi.

In 1976 he returned to the USA and after working as a free-lance musician in San Diego he ultimately took up a position at Cleveland State University where he was Coordinator of Jazz Studies from 1979–2005, served as Interim Chair of the Music Department (1986–87), and served as Chair of the Art Department from 2003-2007.

He returned to Australia in January/February 1979 as part of a group that came to Sydney and Melbourne with Jamey Aebersold, and again in May of the same year with his quartet (with Steve Erquiaga, Bob Bowman and Ed Soph). That same quartet recorded an album in 1995 called "Second Door on the Left".

He has been a frequent performer with the Cleveland Orchestra and soloist with the Cleveland Chamber Symphony since 1982 and has had virtuoso works written for him by David Baker (Parallel Planes), Leroy Jenkins (Wonder Lust), Edwin London (Pressure Points for Solo Alto Saxophone and Orchestra, Balls for solo alto saxophone, and In the Firmament for soprano saxophone, choir and chamber orchestra), Salvatore Martirano (LON/dons), Mike Nock (Pandora Was No Lady), Elliot Schwartz (Cleveland Doubles for saxophone and clarinet soloists with wind ensemble), and Martin Wesley-Smith (Doublets II for alto saxophone and prepared tapes).

Howie Smith has presented an annual "Concert in Progress" in Cleveland every year since 1980, each one an evening of solo and ensemble performances of original compositions. He was the 1985 winner of the Cleveland Arts Prize for Music, has twice served as co-chair of both the Jazz Fellowships and the Music Overview Panels for the National Endowment for the Arts and has been awarded Ohio Arts Council Artist Fellowships on seven occasions.

== Discography ==
As Leader
Second Door on the Left, Sea Breeze SB-3019 (1995)

With Other Artists
Salvatore Martirano: L's G. A., Polydor 245001 (1969)
Jazz Co/op: Jazz Co/Op, Philips Phonogram 6641 225 (1974) (Re-released 2008 by Votary Records Australia)
Kerrie Biddell: Only the Beginning, EMI Australia EMA 314 (1975)
Ross Ryan: After the Applause, EMI Australia EMA 313 (1975)
Jazz Co/op: Live at the Basement, 44 Label 6357 706 (distributed by Philips Phonogram) (1976)
Phil Wilson: Live and Cookin', Outrageous Records #3.K (1977) The Cleveland Jazz All-Stars: Live at Peabody's Cafe, North Coast Jazz NCJ-1 (1982)
Frank Mantooth: Suite Tooth, Optimism OP CD 3217 (1989)
Frank Mantooth: Per-se-vere, Optimism OP CD 3229 (1990)
William Cavanaugh: Works, Cyborg 81848 (1992)
The Cleveland Chamber Symphony: Sound Encounters, GM Recordings GM2039CD (1993)
Midwest Composers: Music for Winds, Opus One CD 154 (1993)
Jack Schantz Quartet: Speechless, Azica AJD-2201 (1993)
Various Artists: Music of Cleveland Composers, Truemedia Records, D90121 (1993)
Frank Mantooth: Dangerous Precedent, Sea Breeze SB-2046 (1993)
The Cleveland Chamber Symphony: Auricles Apertures Ventricles, New World Records 80477-2 (1995)
Frank Mantooth: Sophisticated Lady, Sea Breeze SB-2074 (1995)
Morgan Powell: FoRay FroMorgan, Einstein Records 009 (1995)
Morgan Powell: Morgan Powell, New World Records 80499-2 (1996)
The Cleveland Chamber Symphony: The New American Scene, Albany Records Troy 298 (1998)
Salvatore Martirano: O, O, O, O, That Shakespeherian Rag, New World Records 80535-2 (1998)
The Jazz Unit: Choices, Go-Bop 21459 (1998)
The Cleveland Chamber Symphony: The New American Scene II, Albany Records Troy 303 (1998)
Frank Mantooth; A Miracle, Sea Breeze Jazz SB-2094 (1999)
Morgan Powell: The Morgan Powell Jazz Album, Chicago Lakeside Jazz CLJ-605-2 (1999)
The Cleveland Chamber Symphony: The Music of Edwin London, Albany Records Troy 595 (2003)
The Cleveland Chamber Symphony: Volume 2, Troppe Note/Cambria TNC/Cambria CD-1510 (2005)
The Cleveland Chamber Symphony: Volume 5, Troppe Note/Cambria TNC/Cambria CD-1513-14 (2005)
Charles McPherson: Charles McPherson with Strings: A Tribute to Charlie Parker, Clarion Jazz #90501 (2005)
Helen Welch: One Dream, BigWOW BWP25 (2006)

== Resources ==
Some information about recordings and scores by Howie Smith can be found at Music Australia, an online service developed by the National Library of Australia

A complete listing of Howie Smith's compositions can be found at *BMI
