= Penco Guitars =

- Product type: Musical instruments
- Current owner: Hoshino Gakki Co., Ltd.
- Country: Japan
- Introduced: 1974
- Discontinued: 1978; 48 years ago
- Related brands: Ibanez
- Markets: Japan, United States

Penco was a brand of guitars owned by the Hoshino Gakki Co., also the maker of Ibanez guitars. Penco guitars were manufactured in Hoshino Gakki's factory in Nagoya, Japan, and distributed in the U.S. by the Philadelphia Music Company.

The Penco line of products consisted of electric and acoustic guitars, most of them copies of models of renowned U.S. guitars made by Fender or Gibson. The models came to be called "lawsuit guitars" after a lawsuit filed by Norlin (Gibson's parent company) against Elger (owner of Ibanez) over trademark infringement in 1977. The Ibanez line was distributed on the west coast of the U.S. and Penco on the east coast.

== History ==
Penco made Martin- and Gibson-style acoustic guitars. Reverse engineered and built to spec, some of the closest replicas of the Martin D-28, D-35, D-41, D-45, and D-45 12 models in existence today were made by Penco, as well as bolt-neck copies of Gibson's Les Paul and SG guitars and basses, Rickenbacker 4001 basses, Fender Stratocaster and Telecaster guitars, Fender Jazz bass guitars, 12-string acoustic guitars, and the odd mandolin and banjo. Penco's korina-finished Gibson Explorer-styled guitars were identical to the Ibanez Destroyer and the Greco Destroyer of the same period.

The Penco brand was of relatively high quality. Most Penco acoustics had solid spruce tops and laminated backs and sides of maple or rosewood, depending on the model, though some had laminated tops. The A24, for instance, a 12-string acoustic guitar, had a solid but relatively thin spruce top, rosewood sides and back, and a mahogany neck with a rosewood fingerboard. It also had a zero fret and a screw-adjustable bridge modeled after the Gibson Heritage Jumbo bridge of that period and sold new for around $140 in the mid-1970s. The A10, possibly Penco's first acoustic model, was a solid top AA or AAA size with a laminated rosewood back. The A25, a 12-string acoustic guitar, had a solid spruce top and solid rosewood back and sides, the back being of four book-matched pieces. Acoustic models varied somewhat depending on year of manufacture; for example, only some specimens of the A22M had a thumbscrew-adjustable saddle, and only some had a book-matched back.

== Models ==
Some of the models commercialized with the Penco brand were:

- 5502N Strat,
- A-8M
- A-12
- A-13
- A-14-JD
- A-14-M
- A-15-JD
- A-16
- A-170
- A-18
- A-19
- A-19-JD
- A-20 12
- A-22-M
- A-25
- A-230
- A-330 (Hummingbird copy)
- A-340 (Dove copy)
- A-6
- E-70
- ES Copy
- Howard Roberts ES-175 copy
- J-200
- Les Paul / Les Paul Custom copy
- SG Copy
- SG Bass copy
- Strat copy
- Rickenbacker 4001 copy
- Telecaster copy
- Jazz Bass copy

== See also ==
- Hoshino Gakki
- Ibanez
