= Brian Brown (musician) =

Australian musician

Brian Brown OAM
- Born: Brian Ernest Austin Brown; 29 December 1933; Melbourne, Victoria, Australia
- Died: 28 January 2013 (aged 79) Melbourne, Victoria, Australia
- Genre: Jazz
- Occupations: Musician; educator; composer
- Instruments: Soprano; tenor saxophones; flutes; synthesizers; panpipes; leather bowhorn
- Years active: 1955–1998
- Spouse: Ros McMillan
- Website: brianbrown.com.au

Brian Ernest Austin Brown OAM (29 December 1933 – 28 January 2013) was an Australian jazz musician and educator. He played the soprano and tenor saxophones, flutes, synthesisers (including the WX5 wind synthesiser), panpipes and a leather bowhorn (designed by Garry Greenwood). In 1993 Brown was awarded the Order of Australia for service to the performing arts as a jazz performer, educator and composer.

== Biography ==
Brian Brown was born in Melbourne. He performed as a soloist and led his own ensembles since the mid-1950s throughout Australia and in Scandinavia, United States, Japan, United Kingdom, Italy, Spain, the Netherlands, Brunei and Germany. He played only original music. A self-taught player who emerged in the 1950s as a leading figure in Australia and remained prominent through to the 1980s. According to AllMusic's Ron Wynn, "Brown was one of first Australian musicians to develop a reputation for highly personal, individualistic style that was intense, lyrical and not simple imitation of an American great."

In early 1956 Brown returned to Melbourne from Europe and formed a new Hard Bop band with like-minded players – drummer Stewie Speer, trumpeter Keith Hounslow, schoolboy pianist Dave Martin and bassist Barry Buckley. The Brian Brown Quintet were regulars at Horst Liepolt's influential Jazz Centre 44 in St Kilda, which operated from 1955 to 1960. The band were enthusiastic ambassadors for bop, introducing Melburnians to a musical style which was still largely unheard in Australia.

Brown made eight albums over an 18-year period heading various groups. He toured Europe with his Australian Jazz Ensemble in 1978, and also led groups doing experimental and original classical pieces from 1980 to 1986. He founded the Improvisation Studies course at the Victorian College of the Arts, where he taught from 1978 until his retirement in 1998. He appeared at the World Saxophone Congress in Tokyo in 1988, with Tony Gould. In June 1993 Brown was awarded the Order of Australia for service to the performing arts as a jazz performer, educator and composer.

== Discography ==
- 1972 Brian Brown Quintet 1958
- 1976 Moomba Jazz '76 Vol. 2 (live LP Galapagos Duck/Brian Brown Quintet)
- 1977 Upward
- 1978 Brian Brown Quartet in Concert
- 1979 Bells Make me Sing
- 1972 Carlton Streets
- 1984 Wildflowers
- 1985 The Planets
- 1987 Winged Messenger
- 1990 Spirit of the Rainbow - Brian Brown and Tony Gould (Move records)
- 1997 Flight
- 1998 Last day on Earth
- 2001 Jupiter Moon
- 2003 Images
- 2004 Time will tell
- 2004 Circles
- 2004 Midnight
- 2005 Last Dance
- 2005 Inner Spirit
- 2005 Inner Light
- 2006 Mystic Sky
- 2006 Long Ago
- 2006 Another Time
- 2006 Texture of Light
- 2007 Seasons
- 2007 Magic
- 2007 Cosmic Light
- 2007 Contact
- 2007 Venus Moon
- 2007 Bells in the Night
