= Ten Part Invention =

- Years active: 1986 -

Ten Part Invention is an Australian jazz ensemble formed in 1986 by drummer John Pochée. They came together for the 1986 Adelaide Festival of Arts. They were nominated for the 1992 ARIA Award for Best Jazz Album for their self-titled album.

== Members ==
- John Pochée
- Roger Frampton
- Bernie McGann
- Ken James
- Paul Cutlan
- Steve Elphick
- Andrew Robson
- Bob Bertles
- James Greening
- Warwick Alder
- Sandy Evans
- Paul McNamara
- Dave Goodman
- Miroslav Bukovsky
- Tom Avgenicos
- John Mackey
- Peter Farrar
- Dale Barlow
- Lisa Perrot
- Hugh Fraser

== Discography ==
=== Albums ===
List of albums with selected details
Title	Details
Ten Part Invention	Released: 1990; Label: ABC Records(846729–1); Format: CD, Vinyl
Tall Stories	Released: 1994; Label: Rufus Records (RF006); Format: CD
Unidentified Spaces	Released: 2000; Label: Rufus Records (RF056); Format: CD
Live at Wangaratta : The Music of Roger Frampton	Released: 2005; Label: ABC Jazz (983 4640); Format: CD; Recorded in October 1999
Time Is Moved	Released: May 2026; Label: ABC; Format: CD, digital

== Awards ==
=== ARIA Awards ===
The ARIA Music Awards are presented annually since 1987 by the Australian Recording Industry Association (ARIA).

Year	Nominee / work	Award	Result
1992	Ten Part Invention	Best Jazz Album	Nominated
2026	Time is Moved	Best Jazz Album	Nominated

=== Mo Awards ===
The Australian Entertainment Mo Awards (commonly known informally as the Mo Awards), were annual Australian entertainment industry awards. They recognised achievements in live entertainment in Australia from 1975 to 2016. They won 3 awards in that time.

Year	Nominee / work	Award	Result (wins only)
1989	Ten Part Invention	Jazz Group of the Year	Won
1995	Ten Part Invention	Jazz Group of the Year	Won
1999	Ten Part Invention	Jazz Group of the Year	Won
