= Galapagos Duck =

- Origin: Sydney, Australia
- Genres: Jazz-funk, jazz-rock
- Years active: 1969–present
- Labels: Philips; Polygram; ABC Music; Aim Records; Pintail Productions
- Members: John Conley; Rodney Ford; Adam Thomas; David Spicer; Malcolm Wood
- Past members: Tom Hare; Chris Qua; Des Windsor; Willy Qua; Roger Frampton; Bob Egger; Col Nolan; Ray Alldridge; Marty Mooney; Paul McNamara; Tony Ansell; Glenn Henrich; John Helman; Len Barnard AM; Greg Foster; Adrian Cunningham; Matt Baker

Galapagos Duck is an Australian jazz band. Formed in 1969, they have an extensive history of international touring, including:

- Montreux Jazz Festival, Switzerland
- Jazz Yatra Festival, Bombay, India
- American Musexpo
- Singapore International Jazz Festival
- Queenstown Jazz Festival, New Zealand
- Vanuatu International Jazz Festival, Vanuatu

The band formed in 1969 for the winter season at "The Kosciusko Ski Chalet, Charlotte Pass".

Before it moved to The Rocks Push jazz club in Sydney, the band in 1969 was Marty Mooney and Tom Hare (reeds), Chris Qua (bass and trumpet), and Des Windsor (piano and organ).

Bruce Viles (owner of the Rocks Push) established The Basement jazz club at Circular Quay in 1973 and Galapagos Duck opened there as the house band. At that time, the personnel was Marty Mooney and Tom Hare (reeds), Chris Qua (bass and trumpet), Willie Qua (drums and reeds) and Doug Robson (piano).

Some of the top names in Australian jazz have worked with the band at one time or another, including Dave Levy, Roger Frampton, Col Nolan, Paul McNamara and Warren Daly (ex-Daly-Wilson Big Band).

== Discography ==
- 1974, Ebony Quill
- 1974, The Removalists (Original Soundtrack)
- 1976, St. James
- 1976, Moomba Jazz, live recording of various artists
- 1977, Magnum
- 1978, Right On Cue
- 1979, In Flight
- 1981, This Time
- 1983, The Voyage of The Beagle
- 1985, Endangered Species
- 1989, Habitat
- 1997, Lonely George
- 2006, Out Of The Blue
- 2015, The Other Side of the Mirror

== Sources ==
- Johnson, Bruce (1987), The Oxford Companion To Australian Jazz, Oxford University Press ISBN 0-19-554791-8
