= Elizabeth Grace (musician) =

Australian musical artist

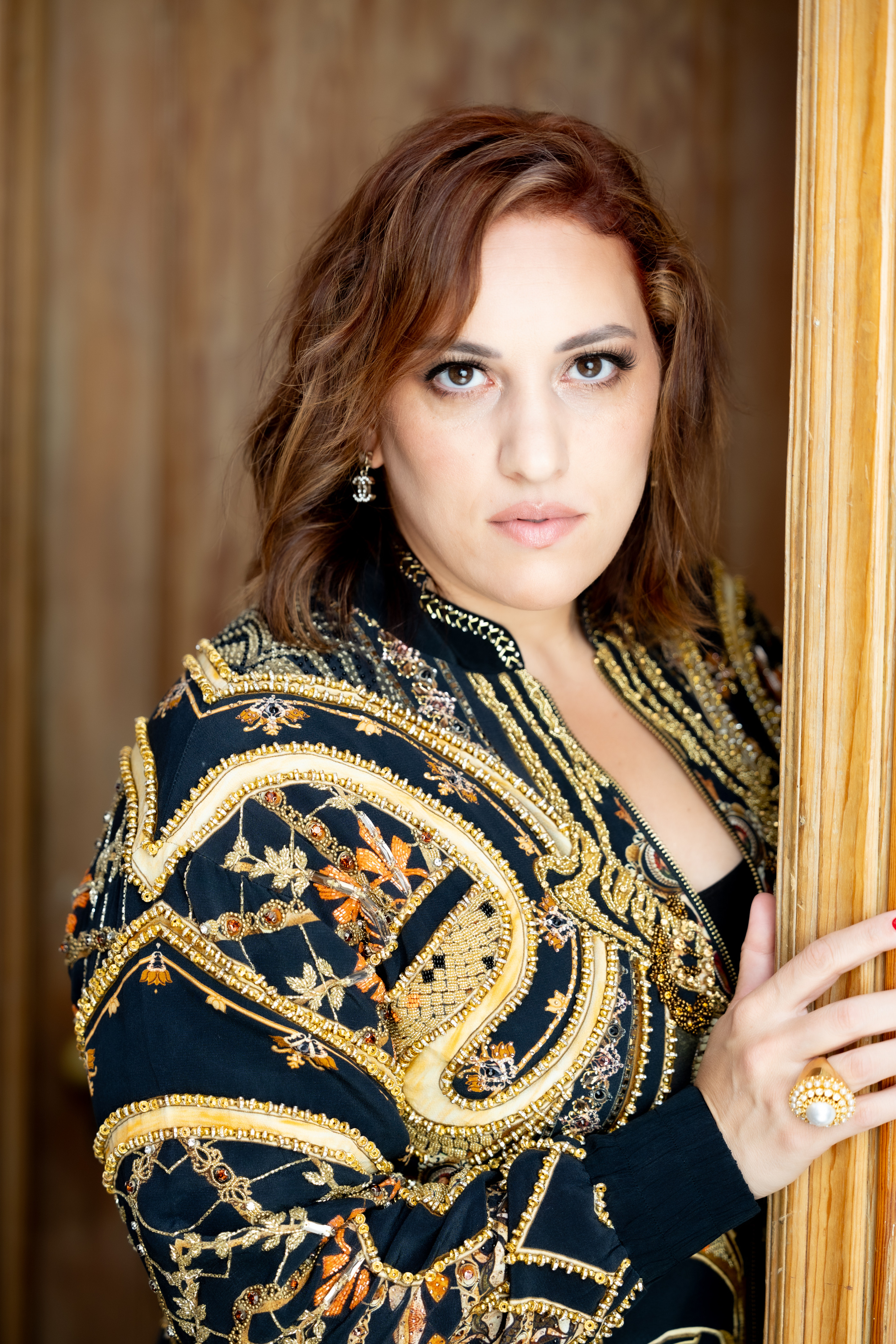
- Grace in 2025

Background information
- Also known as: Liz Tobias
- Born: Elizabeth Grace Chehade; Adelaide, Australia
- Genre: Jazz
- Occupation: Musician
- Website: gracefullyliz.com

Elizabeth Grace, also known as Liz Tobias, is an Australian jazz musician. She has taught at the University of New Hampshire, Berklee College of Music, New England Conservatory of Music, and Massachusetts Institute of Technology.

== Early life and education ==
Elizabeth Grace Chehade was born in Adelaide, Australia. She is the daughter of Evangelical minister Alfred Chehade and Alison Chehade. Grace attended Elder Conservatorium, University of Adelaide for her Bachelor of Music in Vocal Jazz Performance (2004). She also obtained her Honours Degree from the Elder Conservatorium of Music (2009).

In 2012, Grace moved to Boston, United States to begin her Masters and Doctorate at the New England Conservatory of Music, where she was 2014 class speaker and received a Full Presidential Scholarship. There, she completed her Doctorate in Musical Arts in Jazz Voice (Performance). In 2024, she completed her doctoral dissertation on jazz singers Thana Alexa, Sara Serpa, and Norma Winstone. She currently lives in the Upper East Side of New York City.

== Career ==
Elizabeth Grace has taught as a faculty member at several universities, including serving as the Jazz Choir Director at the University of New Hampshire, as an Artist in Residence at the Massachusetts Institute of Technology (MIT), a teacher at the Berklee College of Music's outreach program, and as a Teaching Fellow at the New England Conservatory. She has guest lectured at Harvard University, University of Adelaide, UNH Summer Youth Music school, NEC Summer Jazz Lab and Tabor (Australia).

She has studied under jazz educators and performers such as Dominique Eade, Ken Schaphorst, Jason Moran, Frank Carlberg, Miguel Zenon, Jerry Bergonzi, Fred Hersch, Bob Moses, Kate McGarry, Jo Lawry, Michelle Nicolle, Anita Wardell, Cecil McBee, and vocal technicians Jo Estill and Jeanie LoVetri.

Grace has collaborated with jazz musicians such as Quincy Jones, David Linx, James Morrison, David Holland, Chris Potter, Nick Smart, John Harbison, Ben Monder, Luciana Souza, Jarek Smietana, James Muller, Michael Mayo, and Jacob Collier.

She has performed at various jazz festivals/venues, including:

- Montreux Jazz Festival (Switzerland)
- Panama Jazz Festival (Panama)
- Wangaratta Jazz Festival (Australia)
- Clark Terry Jazz Festival (USA)
- Easy Jazz Festival (Poland)
- Virginia Arts Festival (USA)
- The Sydney Opera House (Aus)
- Adelaide Fringe (Aus)
- Voicingers Festival

== Discography ==
- A Beautiful Friendship (2008)
- Ode to the Unknown (2025)

The album Ode to the Unknown features the following ensemble:

- Kendrick Scott (drums)
- Nir Felder (guitar)
- Matt Penman (bass)
- Chase Baird (Ewi)
- Matthew Sheens (piano/string arranging)
- Escher String Quartet (strings)

== Recognition ==
- Finalist, Generations in Jazz in Australia in 2004
- Winner, Grand Prix at the International Jazz Voicingers Competition in Poland in 2009
- 1st place, Jazz Voices Competition in Lithuania in 2014
- Finalist, Montreux Jazz Voice Competition in Switzerland in 2011
- 3rd place, National Jazz Awards in Australia in 2012
