= Horst Liepolt =

Australian record producer (1927–2019)

Horst Liepolt (27 July 1927 – 9 January 2019) was a jazz producer and artist.

In Australia, and later in the United States, he organized numerous successful jazz concerts and festivals and also produced a large number of jazz recordings.

In Australia he originated the long-running Manly Jazz Festival and jazz at the Festival of Sydney, booked bands for The Basement (Sydney's top jazz club of the 1970s) and presented a number of concerts under his banner of Music Is An Open Sky. His "44" recording label featured some of Australia's top jazz musicians and was representative of many of the Australian jazz groups that were active in the 1970s.

His two New York jazz clubs Sweet Basil and Lush Life presented a number of well-established jazz musicians during the 1980s and early 1990s. He produced over 48 jazz recordings by high-profile US musicians including the Grammy Award winning album Bud and Bird by Gil Evans.

== Biography ==
Horst Liepolt was born in Berlin, Germany on 27 July 1927. His father was a writer, a member of the Bauhaus movement, and his mother was a concert pianist, daughter of a Swedish oboe player who migrated to Germany to join the Berlin Philharmonic. Even though the Nazi regime was heavily opposed to jazz, Liepolt was able to hear some of the music during the war years by visiting underground Berlin jazz clubs and listening to jazz records with friends.

In 1951 he migrated to Australia and became very active producing and promoting Australian jazz. He started his career as a jazz producer when he opened up Jazz Centre 44, a renowned and successful jazz venue in Melbourne which ran for over ten years and featured many top Australian jazz musicians of that era such as Stewie Speer, Brian Brown, Alan Lee, and The Melbourne New Orleans Jazz Band. In 1960 Liepolt moved to Sydney where he became involved with record production and management with acts such as Renee Geyer and Sun and Max Merritt & The Meteors. In the early 1970s he formed a working relationship with The Basement nightclub, Sydney's top jazz club of that era, booking many top contemporary jazz bands for the earlier nights of the week.

Liepolt organized a large number of successful jazz concerts and festivals in Sydney during the 1970s, including the Festival of Sydney jazz festival, the Manly Jazz Festival and his own series of "Music Is An Open Sky" concerts which were presented at high-profile venues such as the Sydney Opera House, the (now demolished) Regent Theatre, the Sydney Town Hall and the Capitol Theatre.

He also produced over thirty recordings for the 44 Jazz Label, distributed by Philips/Phonogram Records Records, which was set up by Liepolt himself and named after the fact that 1944 was the first year that he heard jazz in Germany. Many of Australia's's top jazz artists appeared on these recordings including Galapagos Duck, Jazz Co/op, Bryce Rohde, Mike Nock, Brian Brown, Don Burrows, Col Nolan, Don Andrews, and Peter Boothman.

In 1981 Liepolt moved to the United States and settled in New York City where he opened and ran two successful jazz clubs, Sweet Basil and Lush Life, which hosted some of the top US jazz musicians of the 1980s and 90s including Gil Evans, Art Blakey, Cedar Walton and McCoy Tyner. He also organized and booked artists for the Greenwich Village Jazz Festival for eight years running. Most of the top Greenwich Village jazz clubs participated in this event.

Liepolt produced almost fifty jazz albums in New York during the 1980s, including the album Bud and Bird by Gil Evans and the Monday Night Orchestra, which won a Grammy Award for Best Jazz Instrumental Performance, Big Band in 1989. Another album that he produced Art Blakey and the Jazz Messengers Live at Sweet Basil was nominated for a Grammy award in 1986.

== Social matters and interests ==
Horst Liepolt lived in New York City with his wife Clarita. He had mostly retired from jazz production and spent a lot of his time in abstract painting, much of it being for his ongoing series "Jazz – From the Inside Looking Out."

Some of his paintings are exhibited at the Ward-Nasse Art Gallery in New York and a number of them have been used for CDs, album covers and posters.
