= Bruce Cale =

Australian musician

Bruce Cale (born 17 February 1939, Leura, New South Wales) is an Australian jazz double-bassist and composer.

== Career ==
Cale began studying music at age nine, and worked professionally in Sydney from 1958. He worked with Bryce Rohde's quartet from 1962 to 1965, then moved to England, where he played with Tubby Hayes, Dudley Moore, and was a founding member of John Stevens's Spontaneous Music Ensemble. After obtaining a scholarship, he attended the Berklee College of Music starting in 1966 and remained in the U.S. until 1977, where he played with Ernie Watts and John Handy among others. While in Los Angeles in 1974, he composed the piece Iron Cross for the Los Angeles Philharmonic. The piece led to further commissions, and in 1976 he completed a work dedicated to John Coltrane for voice, jazz ensemble, and symphony orchestra. He also worked with Bryce Rohde again, recording the album Turn Right at New South Wales in 1976.

Upon his return to Sydney in 1977 he led a small ensemble with a shifting lineup which included, at times, Roger Frampton, Bob Bertles, Dale Barlow, Charlie Munro, Phil Treloar, Alan Turnbull, and Tony Buck as sidemen. He led his own Bruce Cale Orchestra through the 1980s, recording three albums with the group. In 1981 he studied for a period in the U.S. with George Russell, and also premiered a double bass concerto, performing as the soloist with the Melbourne Symphony Orchestra. He concentrated on composing from 1988 to 1995, then returned to jazz in the latter half of the 1990s.

During the 90s, Cale's suffered impaired vision, making scoring difficult and he briefly stopped creating music. He later took up the viola, and has returned to composing and improvising.

== Discography ==
=== As leader ===
- The Bruce Cale Quartet at the Opera House (44 Records, 1979)
- A Century of Steps (Larrikin, 1981)
- Live at the Basement Vol. One: Rolling Thunder (Modern, 1987)
- Live at the Basement Vol. Two: Rain (Vista, 1987)
- On Fire (Tall Poppies, 2008)

Bruce Cale Quartet @ Adelaide Festival. 1980. Tall Poppies records Bruce Cale Orchestral Works Tall Poppies Records. 2997

=== As sideman ===
- John Handy, Projections (Columbia, 1968)
- Prince Lasha, Insight (CBS, 1966)
- Essra Mohawk, Primordial Lovers (Reprise, 1970)
- Charlie Munro, Count Down (Columbia, 1969)
- Bryce Rohde, Just Bryce! (CBS, 1965)
- Bryce Rohde, More Spring (Mbs, 1990)
- Spontaneous Music Ensemble, Challenge (Eyemark, 1966)

Zitro ESP Records (1967 New York) Brycw Rohde Turn Right at New South Wales. Bryce Rohde Just Bryce. CBS 1965 Big and Bryce CBS Bryce Rohde Corners CBS Bryce Rohde Duo Always come back here
