= Tama Drums =

Japanese drum brand

- Type: Private
- Industry: Musical instruments
- Founded: 1965; 61 years ago
- Headquarters: Seto, Aichi, Japan
- Parent: Hoshino Gakki
- Website: tama.com

Tama Drums (from Japanese: 多満 (Kanji); タマ (Kana)) is a brand of drums and hardware manufactured and marketed by Hoshino Gakki.

The research and development of its products, along with production of its professional drum lines, is done in Seto, Japan, while its hardware and less expensive drums are manufactured in Guangzhou, China. Hoshino has several offices around the world for marketing and wholesale distribution. Drums destined for the American market are assembled and stocked in Bensalem, Pennsylvania.

== History ==
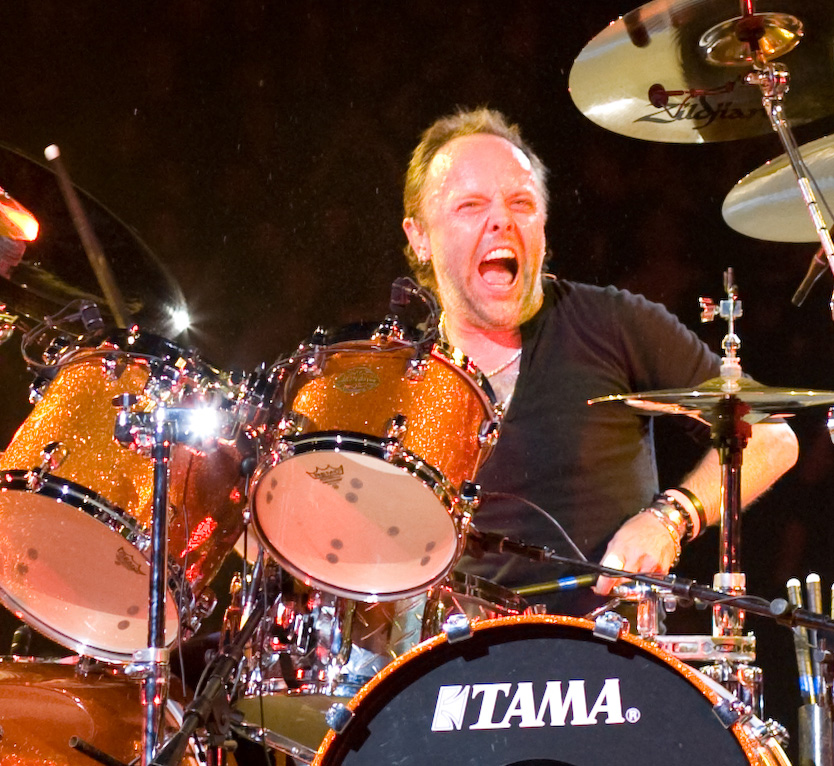
Lars Ulrich

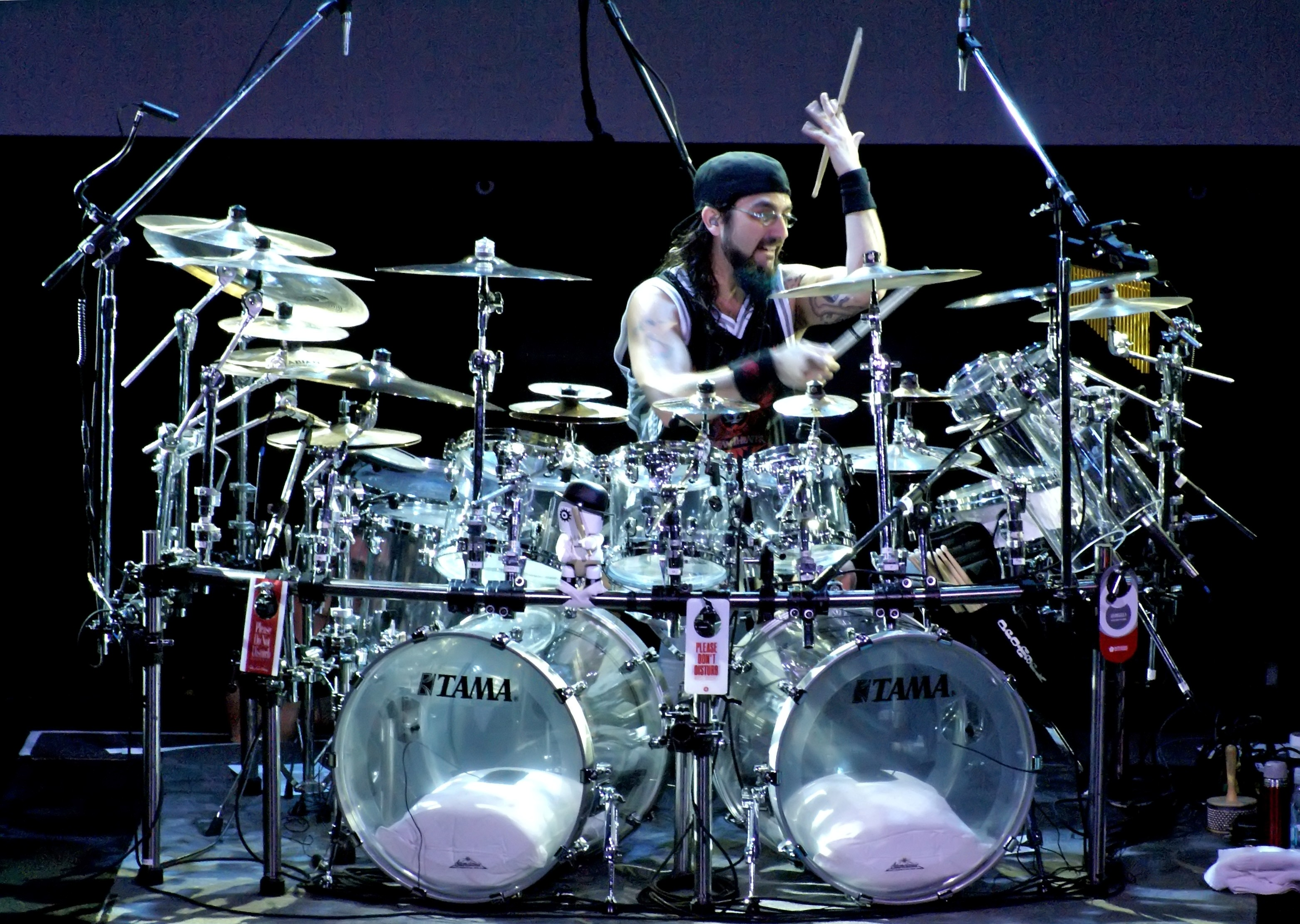
Mike Portnoy

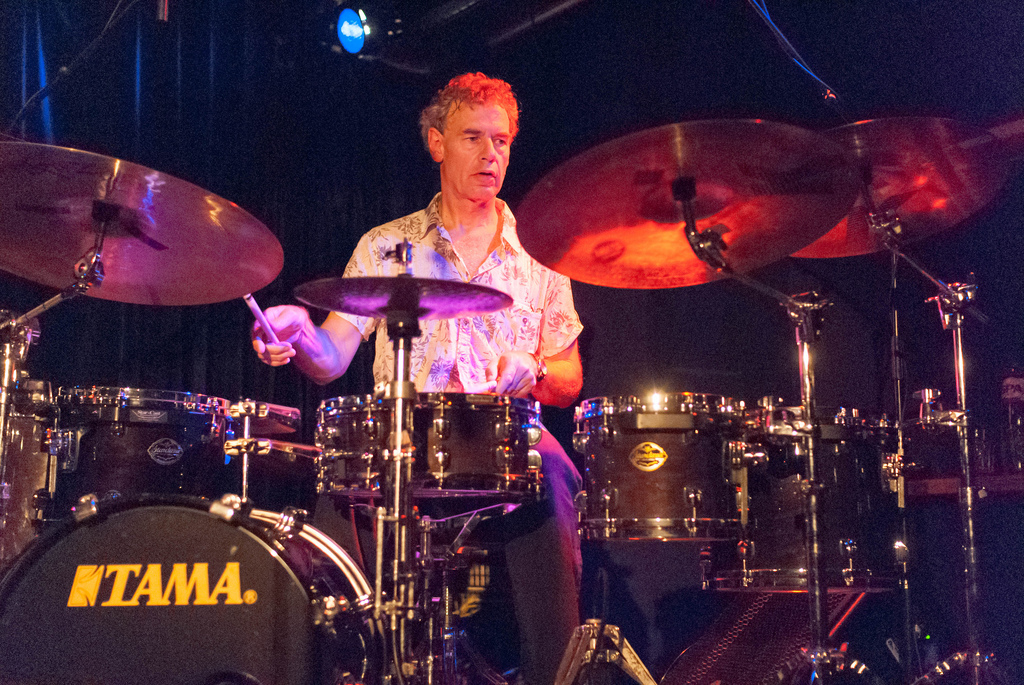
Bill Bruford

Hoshino Gakki began manufacturing drums in 1961 under the name "Star Drums". Hoshino, the family name of the founder, translates to "star field," thus the selection of the "Star Drums" brand name. The drums were manufactured at Hoshino's subsidiary, Tama Seisakusho, which had opened in 1962 to manufacture Ibanez guitars and amplifiers. While the production of guitars and amps was moved out of the factory by 1966, the production of drums there continued to grow. The two higher lines of drum models, Imperial Star and Royal Star, were introduced to the American market and were successful lower-cost drums competing against more expensive American-made drums offered by Rogers, Ludwig, and Slingerland Drum Company at the time.

By 1974, Hoshino decided to make a concerted effort to make high-quality drums and hardware and start marketing its drums under the Tama brand. Tama was the name of the owner's wife, and is also a homophone with the Japanese word meaning "jewel". "Star" continues to be used in the names of Tama's drum models to this day.

Tama and Drum Workshop (DW) jointly bought the bankrupt Camco Drum Company. As part of the deal, DW received the Camco tooling and manufacturing equipment while Tama received the Camco name, designs, engineering and patent rights.

At the time, Camco was producing what was thought to be the best drum pedal on the market, the Camco 5000. DW continued production of the pedal using the original tooling, rebadging it as the DW5000, and eventually upgrading it with a chain drive. Tama began production of a similar pedal, with a chain drive, under the Camco name. The Tama version of the Camco pedal shares no parts with the original Camco 5000 or the DW 5000, and is essentially made of the same parts used on other Tama pedals of the era, save for the footboard. Tama integrated all the engineering from Camco into their production process and the overall level of quality of their drums increased virtually overnight. The original plan was to market the low-end Tama drums to beginners and use the Camco brand to sell high-end drums to professional musicians. High end Camco drums were only sold for a short time, and the earliest of them were actually built in the USA. Tama soon found that these drums were competitive with their own high end Tama lines, and sales were sluggish. The name later appeared on budget level Tama drums, and eventually Camco drums were phased out completely.

Tama is the inventor of a unique type of tubular drums called octobans. Octobans are 6-inches in diameter and are manufactured in eight different lengths ranging from 280 millimetres (11 in) up to 600 millimetres (24 in). They vary in pitch by using different shell lengths, rather than widths.
