= Salvador Ibáñez =

Spanish luthier (1854–1920)

Salvador Ibáñez Albiñana (1854 - October 6, 1917) was a Spanish luthier. He made guitars, ukuleles, mandolins and other stringed instruments. These instruments were prized for their excellent quality and impeccable workmanship.

== Career ==
At eleven years of age Ibáñez became an apprentice in guitar construction at Calle Muela, Valencia.

In 1870 he was registered as a guitar maker at Calle Cubells. Also working in the shop were ten-year-old José Ibáñez and Magdalena Albiñana y Magraner from L'Olleria, Valencia. In 1888 he first appeared in the trade guides at Calle Jordana and shortly after that at Calle Ruzafa; from 1896 to 1927 his shop was located at Bajada de San Francisco. He made bandurrias, lutes, six and twelve-string guitars, and also guitars with detachable necks. In 1897 he made the world's first double-necked guitar. In the period 1915-1927 Salvador Ibáñez e Hijos (Salvador Ibáñez and Sons) was located at Bajada de San Francisco and from 1928 at Calle Padre Rico, Valencia.

After his death in 1917 his workshop continued to be managed by his two sons until it was sold in 1933 to Telesforo Julve, also of Valencia. Julve bought the Salvador Ibáñez name, personnel and machinery and incorporated it in its own enterprise. In 1944 Julve was still using Salvador Ibáñez e Hijos labels.

== Ibanez as a brand ==
Before World War II, there were four importers/distributors in Japan for Ibáñez's guitars, of which Yamaha is the best known. Just before or just after the Second World War, the Japanese firm Hoshino Gakki began production of its own acoustic guitars for the home market. Although it did not have a business relationship with either Ibáñez or Julve, Hoshino Gakki marketed their acoustic guitars first under the brand name "Ibanez Salvador" and later simply as "Ibanez". These guitars attained great market success in the 1970s and 1980s.

Hoshino Gakki currently produces both acoustic and electric guitars using the Ibanez brand name, but is mostly oriented to producing electric guitars.

== Original Ibáñez players ==
Julian Bream has played a Salvador Ibáñez guitar. Eric Clapton has owned several original guitars of Ibáñez, one of which was sold at a benefit auction in 1999 obtaining a final price of US$42,000.

== Sources ==
- Historic Guitar Markers of the Valencia School at www.zavaletas-guitarras.com
- Telesforo Julve at https://guitarrasvalencia.wordpress.com/
- Announcement of Salvador's passing in the newspaper La Correspondencia de Valencia from October 6,1917 at https://archive.org/details/LaCorrespondencia_Valencia_17210_19171006/

José L. Romanillos Vega & Marian Harris Winspear, The vihuela de mano and the Spanish guitar, 2002, Guijosa.
