= Tasdance =

Dance company from Tasmania, Australia

Tasdance is a contemporary dance company based in Launceston, Tasmania, Australia.

It was founded in 1981 as Australia's first dance-in-education company. Since then, Tasdance's activities have broadened to mainstage performances as well as development and engagement programs for dance artists, students and the community.

It received the Group Award at the Sidney Myer Performing Arts Awards for 2007.
