= Daly-Wilson Big Band =

Australian jazz group

- Origin: Sydney, New South Wales, Australia
- Genres: Jazz, swing
- Years active: 1968–1971, 1973–1983
- Labels: Columbia; Festival; Reprise; Hammard
- Past members: Warren Daly; Ed Wilson

The Daly-Wilson Big Band was an Australian jazz group formed in 1968 by Warren Daly on drums and Ed Wilson on trombone. The business manager and silent partner was Don Raverty. The line-up, at times, was an eighteen-piece ensemble, that played popular jazz cover versions and originals. Lead singers that fronted the band include Kerrie Biddell, Marcia Hines and Ricky May. They released seven albums and toured Australia and internationally before disbanding in September 1983.

== History ==
Daly-Wilson Big Band was formed in Sydney in 1968 by Warren Daly on drums and Ed Wilson on trombone. Don Raverty was asked to manage and co-ordinate the band and was a business partner from the beginning, as well as playing lead trumpet. Daly began his musical career in the late 1950s as a drummer in the Ramblers and then the Steeds. In the mid-1960s he toured the United States as a member of Kirby Stone Four, and then with Si Zentner; later he joined Glenn Miller Orchestra (led by Buddy DeFranco). Wilson had trained as a pianist before changing over to brass instruments. In 1966 he joined the ABC Dance Band conducted by Jim Gussey. He subsequently played with the Sydney Symphony and TCN-9 house band led by Geoff Harvey.

In August 1969, Daly-Wilson Band performed at the Stage Club with a line-up of "top jazz and session musicians" including Kerrie Biddell on lead vocals; Tony Buchanan on saxophones, harmonica and clarinet; Graeme Lyall on saxophone; Bob McIvor on trombone; Col Nolan on organ, piano and electric piano; and Dieter Vogt on flugelhorn and trumpet. In September 1970, they recorded their debut album, Live! At the Cell Block, which captured their live performance at Cell Block Theatre, Sydney. It was produced by Mike Perjanik and released on Columbia Records. Additional ensemble members on the album were Mark Bowden, George Brodbeck, John Costelloe, Ken Dean, Doug Foskett, Col Loughnan, Allan Nash, Ford Ray, Don Reid, Ned Sutherland, Bernie Wilson. The album includes a cover version of "Tie Me Kangaroo Down, Sport" as "Kanga", a track written by fellow Australian artist, Rolf Harris.

In January 1971, the group supported the United Kingdom jazz band, Dudley Moore Trio, on the Australian leg of their international tour. Michael Foster of The Canberra Times described Daly-Wilson Big Band as "an exciting two-year-old group formed by Warren Daly and Ed Wilson, drummer and trombonist respectively. It has the unmatchable sound of musicians playing mainly for their own enjoyment and has won critical acclaim at all of its relatively few public appearances." He praised their live performance, especially "When the band lets go, which is often, the sound is a blast, literally and metaphorically. And Kerrie Biiddell, the vocalist, pencil-thin, freckled and animated, raises a storm somewhere deep inside." Foster also reviewed their album, "[its] arrangements are lively and all are spiced with this rushing excitement of shouting horns and driving rhythm section. Use of amplification helps the volume ... the very composition of the band preserves the brassy feel of big band jazz."

Live! At the Cell Block was released in the US in late 1971. They were "rapidly gathering a strong following" but by November, Daly-Wilson Big Band announced their disbandment. DeFranco asked both Daly and Wilson to join the Glenn Miller Orchestra; In 1972 Festival Records released The Exciting Daly-Wilson Band, which included lead vocals from Biddell. Soon after recording this album, they had run out of finances and could no longer afford to tour their big band line-up. Biddell resumed her solo career; she told Jean DeBelle of The Australian Women's Weekly that when she joined they were "just starting to happen. I got my biggest break when I started singing with them, as the band played to huge audiences."

In May 1973, Daly-Wilson Big Band reformed, with financial support from commercial patron, Benson & Hedges, and undertook another Australian tour, as well as New Zealand. Their vocalists were Linda Cable, Terry Holden, Dilys Lockett and Neva Phillips. They subsequently issued another album, On Tour, with Daly and Wilson joined by Ray Alldridge on keyboards; Warren Clark, Larry Elam, Norm Harris, Mick Kenny and Don Raverty on trumpets; Herb Cannon, Merv Knott, Bob McIvor and Peter Scott on trombones; Dave Donovan and Hugh Williams on guitars; Doug Foskett, Paul Long, John Mitchell, Geoff Naughton and Bob Pritchard on saxophones; and John Helman on bass guitar. It was co-produced by Daly-Wilson and Tommy Tycho for Reprise Records.

From February 1974, the ensemble's lead singer was Marcia Hines – fresh from her stint as Mary Magdalene in the Australian stage production of Jesus Christ Superstar. In September 1975, they toured the Soviet Union at the request of Gosconcert as part of a cultural exchange. They played venues in Moscow, Vilnius, Kaunas, Riga and St Petersburg to packed houses and local critical acclaim. The Australian ABC Network sent producer Bernie Cannon to film the latter part of the Russian tour that was later viewed in Australia. They were scheduled to play at Ronnie Scott's Jazz Club in London but this was thwarted by British Customs who refused to release their instruments. From there they flew to Las Vegas where they performed at the Las Vegas Hilton, sharing the stage with B.B. King and Wilson Pickett. Then to Los Angeles for two nights, again to packed houses, at a local Jazz club.

Their next album, Daly-Wilson Big Band featuring Marcia Hines (1975), had Hines' vocals on the cover songs, "Ain't No Mountain High Enough" and "Do You Know What It Means to Miss New Orleans?". Foster felt that Hines "brings that bubbling vivacity which is her stage mark to her appearances. I like her best on 'Orleans'. She seems to get right inside this particular airing. Perhaps it evoked some [memories] of her homeland which she visited... during the highly successful world tour made by the band." During late 1974 Hines had also recorded her debut solo album, Marcia Shines (October 1975). She left the jazz ensemble to promote her album and focus on her solo career.

In November 1976, US entertainer, Vic Damone, featured Daly-Wilson Big Band for a TV special aimed at the US market, Australia for the Fun of It, which also included Bill and Boyd, The Angels and David Gulpilil. Also that year they issued another album, In Australia '77, on the Hammard label. During January 1977 they toured Australia with New Zealand-born vocalist, Ricky May, fronting the group.

In 1978, they issued their next album, Too Good for a One Night Stand, on Hammard. They released their seventh album, Big 'N' Brassy, in 1982. In September 1983 they disbanded. According to AllMusic's reviewer "Sponsorship had been withdrawn and finances were as strained as the leaders' acrimonious relationship." During their career Daly-Wilson Big Band had "introduced jazz to a large commercial market, although some purists criticised its jazz rock approach, but there were many future jazz greats that passed through its ranks."

Alumni of the band include saxophonists Don Burrows and Graham Jesse, trumpet players Paul Panichi, Keith Stirling, Bob Bouffler, and Peter Salt, trombonists Steve Powell, Herb Cannon, Mick Mulcahy, and James Morrison, guitarist Mick Reid, and keyboard player Charlie Hull.

== Discography ==
=== Albums ===
List of albums, with selected chart positions
Title	Album details	Peak chart positions
Title	Album details	AUS
Live! At the Cell Block	Released: 1970; Format: LP; Label: Columbia Records (SCXO-7979); Recorded at Cell Block Theatre	-
The Exciting Daly-Wilson Band (featuring Kerrie Biddell)	Released: 1972; Format: LP; Label: Festival Records (SFL-934453)	-
On Tour	Released: 1973; Format: LP; Label: Reprise Records (RS-4003); Live album	-
Daly-Wilson Big Band (featuring Marcia Hines)	Released: December 1975; Format: LP, Cassette; Label: Reprise Records (60-0023)	87
Daly Wilson Big Band in Australia '77	Released: December 1976; Format: LP, Cassette; Label: Hammard (HAM 014)	39
Too Good for a One Night Stand	Released: 1978; Format: LP, Cassette; Label: Hammard (HAM 027)	-
The Best of the Daly-Wilson Big Band	Released: 1979; Format: 2xLP; Label: Festival Records (L70145/6); Compilation album	-
Big 'N' Brassy	Released: September 1982; Format: LP, Cassette; Label: Hammard (HAM 077)	90

== Awards ==
=== Mo Awards ===
The Australian Entertainment Mo Awards (commonly known informally as the Mo Awards), were annual Australian entertainment industry awards. They recognise achievements in live entertainment in Australia from 1975 to 2016. Daly-Wilson Big Band won two awards in that time.

Year	Nominee / work	Award	Result (wins only)
1981	Daly-Wilson Big Band	Instrumental/Vocal Showgroup of the Year	Won
1982	Daly-Wilson Big Band	Showgroup of the Year	Won
