= Warren Daly =

Australian drummer and bandleader

Warren Daly OAM
- Born: 22 August 1943 (age 82); Sydney, Australia
- Genres: Jazz
- Occupations: Drummer, bandleader
- Website: www.warrendaly.com.au

Warren Daly OAM (born 22 August 1943 in Sydney) is an Australian jazz musician. He was co-founder of the Daly-Wilson Big Band, named after Daly and trombonist/arranger Ed Wilson, and formed in 1968. In 1975, with corporate sponsorship, the band toured internationally including the Soviet Union. It has been described as "Australia's most commercially successful jazz orchestra".

Following a later split with Wilson, Daly formed the Warren Daly Big Band.

In his early career, he was a drummer in a series of pop groups, including the Sydney based 'The Steeds', alongside David Johnstone, which performed primarily at Police Boys Clubs around Sydney. Later he was able to visit the USA where he worked with distinguished artists such as Buddy De Franco.

In the 1991 Queen's Birthday Honours, Daly was awarded the Medal of the Order of Australia (OAM) "for service to music as band leader and drummer".
