= Wangaratta Festival of Jazz =

- Genre: Jazz
- Dates: Late October or early November
- Locations: Wangaratta, Victoria, Australia
- Years active: 1990–2018, 2020–
- Founders: City of Wangaratta; Adrian Jackson
- Website: wangarattajazz.com

The Wangaratta Festival of Jazz is an annual Australian festival of jazz and blues, founded in 1990 by the City of Wangaratta with Adrian Jackson as its first director. It is held at various venues in the town of Wangaratta, 260 kilometres (161.6 mi) north east of the state capital, Melbourne.

Since its inception the festival has grown to include 90 events and over 350 national and international artists performing each year. The Wangaratta Festival of Jazz also hosts the National Jazz Awards, Youth Jazz Workshops, master classes and events throughout Wangaratta and surrounding wine regions.

In 1999 the festival won a National Tourism Award and was inducted into the Victorian Tourism Hall of Fame. In 2000 the Wangaratta Festival of Jazz became a Victorian Hallmark Event.

== History ==
The Wangaratta Festival of Jazz was conceived in 1989, when a group of local business people suggested the idea to the City of Wangaratta's Council. They funded a feasibility study which concluded that, although there were numerous music festivals in Australia, a point of difference could be achieved with one based on modern and contemporary jazz. It was recommended that such a festival be built around an international-standard jazz competition, initially for piano.

The first festival was staged on 2 to 4 November 1990. Adrian Jackson was its artistic director from 1990 to 2016. It was a much smaller event in its early years: attendances were around 2500 or so, and total box-office was around $25,000. But the event was regarded as a success, and was hailed in The Age and The Sydney Morning Herald (by Sydney jazz critic John Clare) as "the best festival of its kind ever held in Australia." Such feedback helped convince the Council that the event had a future and continued supporting it.

A feature of the festival is the National Jazz Awards, a competition designed to encourage and promote young musicians. It was initially run as a piano competition for pianists (from 1990 to 1992), but this was changed to feature a different instrument each year. The inaugural winner of the piano competition, Barney McAll, received a prize of $5,000 and a return air fare to France to compete in the Paris Concours International Piano Competition.

The festival grew through the 1990s and stabilised in size and format through its second decade. In its first four years, it had one international guest; later several international bands or soloists are featured, often in collaborative projects with Australian artists. In its early years the festival was managed by a sub-committee organised and underwritten by the local council. In 1995 it was incorporated as a not-for-profit organisation, and has since been run as an independent body. The Rural City of Wangaratta remains a key stakeholder, as does the Victorian Government (which provides funding via Arts Victoria and Tourism Victoria), and the Australian Government via the Australia Council for the Arts. In 2000 Tourism Victoria recognised the festival as a Victorian Hallmark Event, for its cultural and economic significance to the Wangaratta region and Victoria.

In 2018 the Board of the Festival voted to put the Wangaratta Festival of Jazz & Blues on a year's hiatus. The reasons given were related to "the need to look strategically at the festival's operating model, and its long-term sustainability."

The COVID-19 pandemic caused the festival to go virtual since 2020.

== National Jazz Awards History ==
In the Wangaratta Festival of Jazz' first year (1990), it was decided to feature an international-standard jazz piano competition, for musicians up to the age of 35. The format and rules were based on similar competitions in France (the Martial Solal Piano Competition) and the United States (the Thelonious Monk International Jazz Piano Competition). At that time each contestant provided an audio tape, "from which finalists will be selected. These will be short-listed for the play-off."

The inaugural winner was Barney McAll, with Jann Rutherford winning second prize and Scott Griffiths the third prize. In 1991, Mark Fitzgibbon won first prize, followed by Jann Rutherford and Cathy Harley. In 1992, Jann Rutherford succeeded on her third attempt; Cathy Harley was the runner-up, with Jeff Usher in third place. After that, it was decided to alter the format to feature saxophone, and from 1996, to rotate the featured instrument each year.

Year	Winner	Final nominees	Instrument	Ref(s)
1990	Barney McAll	Jann Rutherford, Scott Griffiths	Piano	
1991	Mark Fitzgibbon	Jann Rutherford, Cathy Harley	Piano	
1992	Jann Rutherford	Cathy Harley, Jeff Usher	Piano	
1993	Tim Hopkins	Blaine Whittaker, Graeme Norris	Saxophone	
1994	Julien Wilson	Elliott Dalgleish, Lisa Parrott	Saxophone	
1995	Elliott Dalgleish	Jamie Oehlers, Blaine Whittaker	Saxophone	
1996	Scott Tinkler	Phil Slater, James Greening	Brass	
1997	Will Guthrie	Dave Goodman, Danny Fischer	Drums	
1998	Michelle Nicolle	Lily Dior, Martin Breeze	Vocals	
1999	Matt McMahon	Aron Ottignon, Cathy Harley	Piano	
2000	James Muller and Stephen Magnusson (tied)	Carl Dewhurst	Guitar	
2001	Brendan Clarke	Matt Clohesy, Dane Alderson	Bass	
2002	Roger Manins	Jamie Oehlers, Blaine Whittaker	Saxophone	
2003	Phil Slater	Eugene Ball, Paul Williamson	Brass	
2004	Felix Bloxsom	Craig Simon, Dave Goodman	Drums	
2005	Elana Stone	Jo Lawry, Kristin Berardi	Vocals	
2006	Jackson Harrison	Marc Hannaford, Aaron Choulai	Piano	
2007	Aaron Flower	Ben Hauptmann, Hugh Stuckey	Guitar	
2008	Phil Stack	Ben Waples, Sam Anning	Bass	
2009	Zac Hurren	Phil Noy, Jacam Manricks	Saxophone	
2010	Eamon McNelis (trumpet)	Matt Jodrell, Nick Garbett	Brass	
2011	Tim Firth	Ben Falle, Dave Goodman	Drums	
2012	Kristin Berardi	Kate Kelsey-Sugg, Liz Tobias	Vocals	
2013	Joseph O'Connor	Steve Barry, Daniel Gassin	Piano	
2014	Carl Morgan	Hugh Stuckey, Peter Koopman	Guitar	
2015	Sam Anning	Alex Boneham, Thomas Botting	Bass	
2016	Mike Rivett	Troy Roberts, Jeremy Rose	Saxophone	
2017	James Macaulay (trombone)	Niran Dasika, Thomas Avgenicos	Brass	
2018	Alex Hirlian	Angus Mason, Oliver (Oli) Nelson	Drums	
2019	No award - festival not held	No award - festival not held	-	-
2020	Lauren Henderson	Joshua Kyle, Jess Spina	Vocals	
2021	Matthew Thomson	Matthew Sheens, Steve Barry	Piano	
2022	Peter Koopman	Joshua Meader, Julius Schwing	Guitar	
2023	Blakely McLean Davies	Alistair Peel, Jordan Tarento	Bass	
2024	Stephen Byth	Tessie Overmyer, Oscar Bruten	Saxophone	
