= Col Nolan =

Australian jazz organ and piano player

- Born: 16 April 1938
- Origin: Australia
- Died: 26 May 2019; Lewisham, NSW
- Genres: Jazz
- Occupation(s): Organist, pianist
- Instrument(s): Organ, piano

Col Nolan was an Australian jazz organ and piano player. He was nominated for the 1997 ARIA Award for Best Jazz Album with Nolan's Groove, recorded with David Seidel on bass and Laurie Bennett on drums along with guest musicians. The Nolan-Buddle Quartet's (Nolan, Errol Buddle, Dieter Vogt and Warren Daly) 1976 single release of the theme from Picnic at Hanging Rock charted in the Australian top 40.

== Discography ==
=== Albums ===
List of albums, with selected details and chart positions
Title	Album details	Peak chart positions
Title	Album details	AUS
Crazy Crochet (as Col Nolan Soul Syndicate)	Released: 1966; Label: CBS (BP 233319)	—
Whatever It's Worth (as Col Nolan Soul Syndicate)	Released: 1968; Label: CBS (SBP 233621)	—
Live at Jason's (as Col Nolan Soul Syndicate)	Released: 1973; Label: Avan-Guard (SVL 501); Note: Live album	—
The Odd Couple (as The Nolan-Buddle Quartet)	Released: 1976; Label: M7 (MLF 100)	—
Arrangements (as The Col Nolan Quartet)	Released: 1976; Label: M7 (MLF 157)	87
The Main Stream	Released: 1990; Label: 2MBS-FM (MBS JAZZ 7)	—
Nolan's Groove	Released: 1997; Label: La Brava	—

=== Singles ===
List of singles, with selected chart positions
Title	Year	Peak chart positions
Title	Year	AUS
"Matilda" / "Phoenix Love Theme" (as Col Nolan Soul Syndicate)	1966	—
"What's the Use?" / "Buckingham Palace" (as Col Nolan Soul Syndicate)	1973	—
"My Machine" / "Killing Me Softly with His Love" (as The Nolan-Buddle Quartet)	1975	—
"Picnic at Hanging Rock" (as The Nolan-Buddle Quartet)	1976	15
"Love in Spring" / "Dry Country" (as The Col Nolan Quartet)	1977	—
"Shades of McSoul" / "Whatever It's Worth" (as Col Nolan Soul Syndicate)	2019	—

== Awards and nominations ==
=== ARIA Music Awards ===
The ARIA Music Awards is an annual awards ceremony that recognises excellence, innovation, and achievement across all genres of Australian music. They commenced in 1987.

Year	Nominee / work	Award	Result	Ref.
1997	Nolans Groove	Best Jazz Album	Nominated	
