= Bernie McGann =

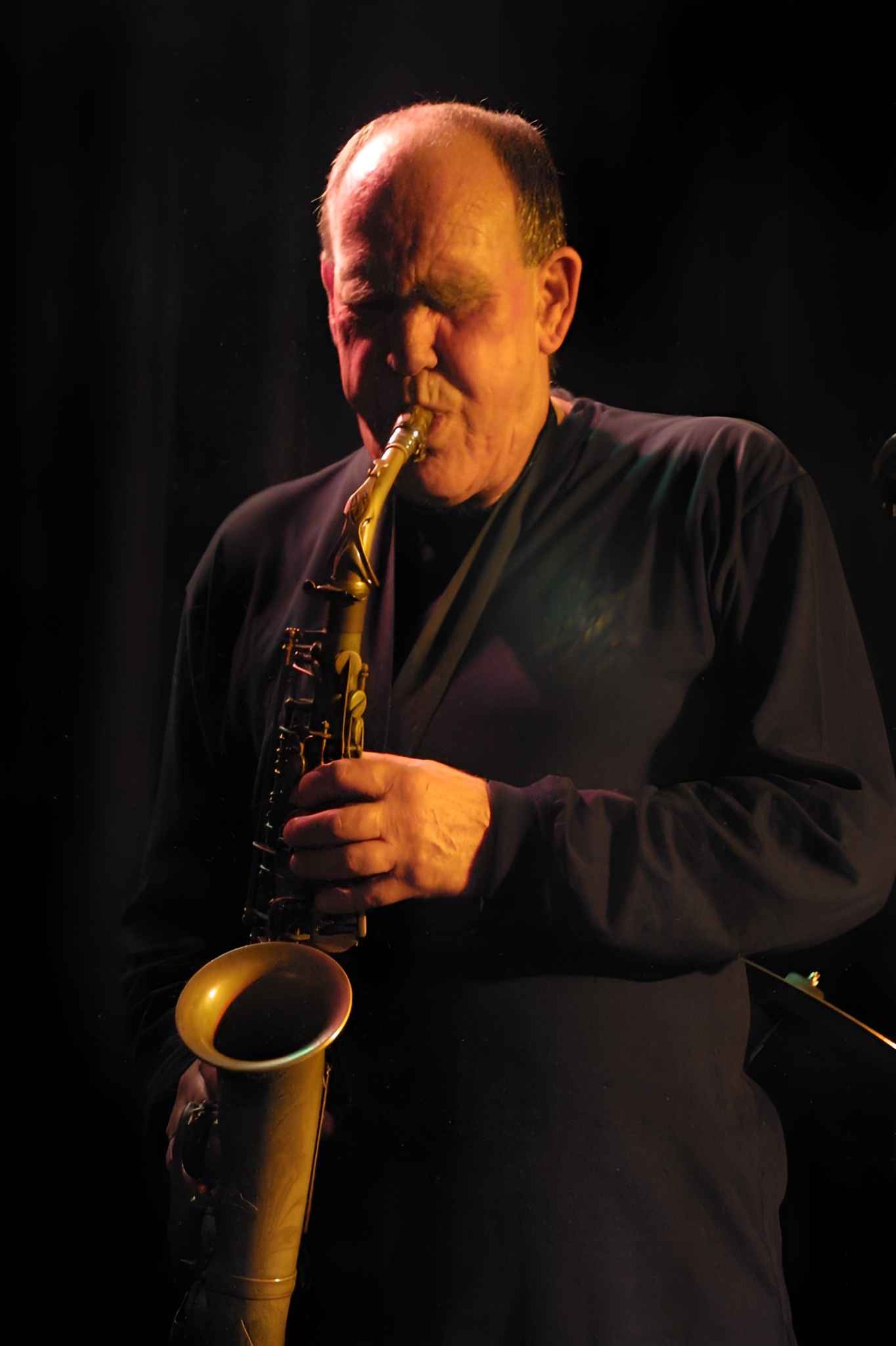
- Bernie McGann performing at the Blue Lamp Aberdeen 21 October 2004

Background information
- Born: Bernard Francis McGann; 22 June 1937; Granville, New South Wales, Australia
- Origin: Sydney, Australia
- Died: 17 September 2013 (aged 76)
- Genre: Jazz
- Instrument: Alto saxophone
- Label: Rufus Records
- Formerly of: The Last Straw; Bernie McGann Trio; Bernie McGann Quartet

Bernard Francis McGann (22 June 1937 – 17 September 2013) was an Australian jazz alto saxophone player. He began his career in the late 1950s and remained active as a performer, composer and recording artist until near the end of his life. McGann won four ARIA Music Awards between 1993 and 2001.

McGann led the Bernie McGann Trio and Bernie McGann Quartet through his career. The most well-known lineup of the Trio was McGann (alto sax), John Pochee (drums), Lloyd Swanton (bass), with the addition of Warwick Alder (trumpet) in the quartet.

== Career ==
Born in Granville, in Sydney's western suburbs, McGann first came to prominence as part of a loose alliance of modern jazz musicians who performed at the El Rocco Jazz Cellar in Kings Cross, Sydney in the late 1950s and early 1960s. He had an enduring collaboration with drummer John Pochee.

During the 1960s and early 1970s, McGann also performed with rock and pop groups and as a session musician, and in the 1970s he was a member of the Sydney rock-soul band Southern Comfort. In 1974, McGann was a founding member of jazz group, The Last Straw.

Between 1980 and 1982, McGann played support to US jazz artists, including Freddie Hubbard, Lester Bowie, and Dave Liebman.

In 1983, McGann studied in New York on a grant from The Australia Council.

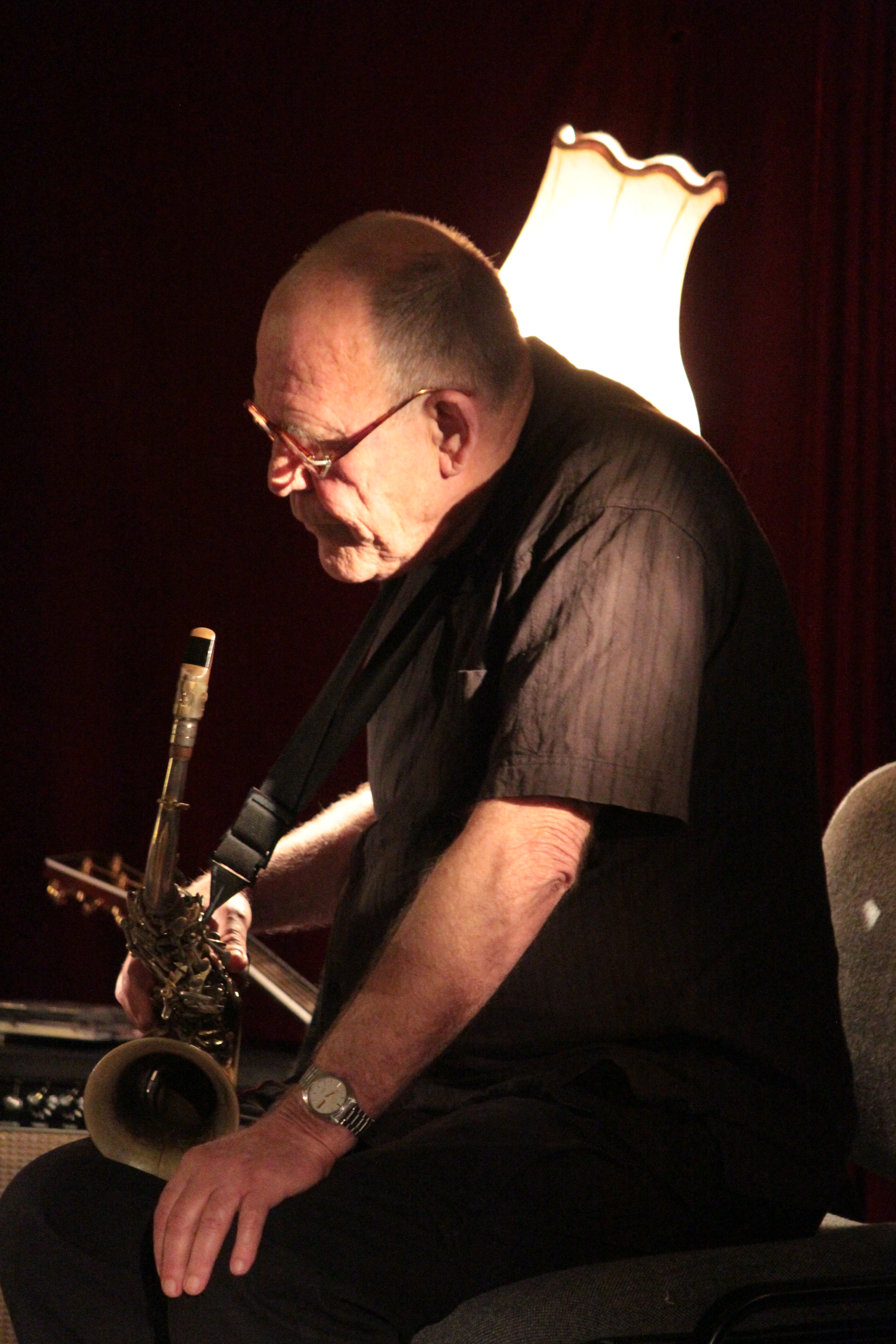
Bernie McGann in 2011

In 1988, McGann Toured Australia and USA with the Australian Jazz Orchestra, a special Bicentennial project. He was a featured artist in award-winning documentary film Beyond El Rocco.

In 1992, McGann won the Spiral Scratch MO Award for Bernie McGann Trio in Jazz Group of the Year.

At the ARIA Music Awards of 1993, McGann won the ARIA Award for Best Jazz Album.

In 1994, McGann won Australian Mo Awards for Jazz Instrumentalist of the Year.

In 1998, McGann won the Don Banks Music Award, the first time it has been awarded to a non-classical musician/composer. Launch of biography Bernie McGann: A Life in Jazz by Geoff Page (Kardooraire Press).

At the ARIA Music Awards of 2001, McGann won his fourth ARIA Award.

McGann died on 17 September 2013, following complications from heart surgery. He was 76.

== Discography ==
=== Albums ===
Title	Album details
The Ted Vining Trio (as Bernie McGann with the Ted Vining Trio)	Released: 1984; Label: Anteater Records (018); Note: Recorded at the RMIT Glasshouse Theatre on 24 April 1983.
At Long Last (as Bernie McGann Trio)	Released: 1987; Label: Emanem (3601)
Kindred Spirits (as Bernie McGann Quartet)	Released: 1987; Label: Emanem (3602)
Ugly Beauty	Released: 1991; Label: Spiral Scratch (0010)
Bernie McGann Trio (as Bernie McGann Trio)	Released: 1992; Label:
McGann McGann	Released: 1995; Label: Terra Nova Records (TND-9017)
McGann Playground	Released: 1997; Label: Rufus Records (RF023)
Bundeena	Released: 2000; Label: Rufus Records (RF053)
Live At The Side On	Released: 2005; Label: Rufus Records (RF073); Note: Recorded at Annandale, Sydney on 13 March 2003.
Blue for Pablo Too	Released: 2005; Label: Rufus Records (RF083)
Always (with Paul Grabowsky)	Released: 2006; Label: ABC Jazz (476 5272)
Solar	Released: 2009; Label: Rufus Records (RF093)
Double Dutch?	Released: 2010; Label: Rufus Records (RF103)
Wending	Released: 2012; Label: Rufus Records (RF113)
1966	Released: 2014; Label: Sarang Bang Records (SBR028); Note: Live performance recorded in Sydney, Australia in 1966.

== Awards and nominations ==
=== ARIA Music Awards ===
The ARIA Music Awards is an annual awards ceremony that recognises excellence, innovation, and achievement across all genres of Australian music. It commenced in 1987.

Year	Nominee / work	Award	Result	Ref.
1993	Bernie McGann Trio (as Bernie McGann Trio)	Best Jazz Album	Won	
1995	McGann McGann (as Bernie McGann Trio)	Best Jazz Album	Won	
1997	Playground (as Bernie McGann Trio)	Best Jazz Album	Won	
2001	Bundeena (as Bernie McGann Trio)	Best Jazz Album	Won	
2006	Always (with Paul Grabowsky)	Best Jazz Album	Nominated	
2012	Wending	Best Jazz Album	Nominated	

=== Australian Jazz Bell Awards ===
The Australian Jazz Bell Awards, (also known as the Bell Awards or The Bells), are annual music awards for the jazz music genre in Australia. They commenced in 2003.

Year	Nominee / work	Award	Result
2008	Bernie McGann	Hall of Fame	inducted

=== Don Banks Music Award ===
The Don Banks Music Award was established in 1984 to publicly honour a senior artist of high distinction who has made an outstanding and sustained contribution to music in Australia. It was founded by the Australia Council in honour of Don Banks, Australian composer, performer and the first chair of its music board.

Year	Nominee / work	Award	Result
1998	Bernie McGann	Don Banks Music Award	Won

=== Mo Awards ===
The Australian Entertainment Mo Awards (commonly known informally as the Mo Awards), were annual Australian entertainment industry awards. They recognise achievements in live entertainment in Australia from 1975 to 2016. Bernie McGann won three awards in that time.

Year	Nominee / work	Award	Result (wins only)
1992	Bernie McGann Trio	Jazz Group of the Year	Won
1994	Bernie McGann	Jazz Instrumental Performer of the Year	Won
1997	Bernie McGann Trio	Jazz Group of the Year	Won
