= Ibanez Artcore series =

Ibanez Artcore
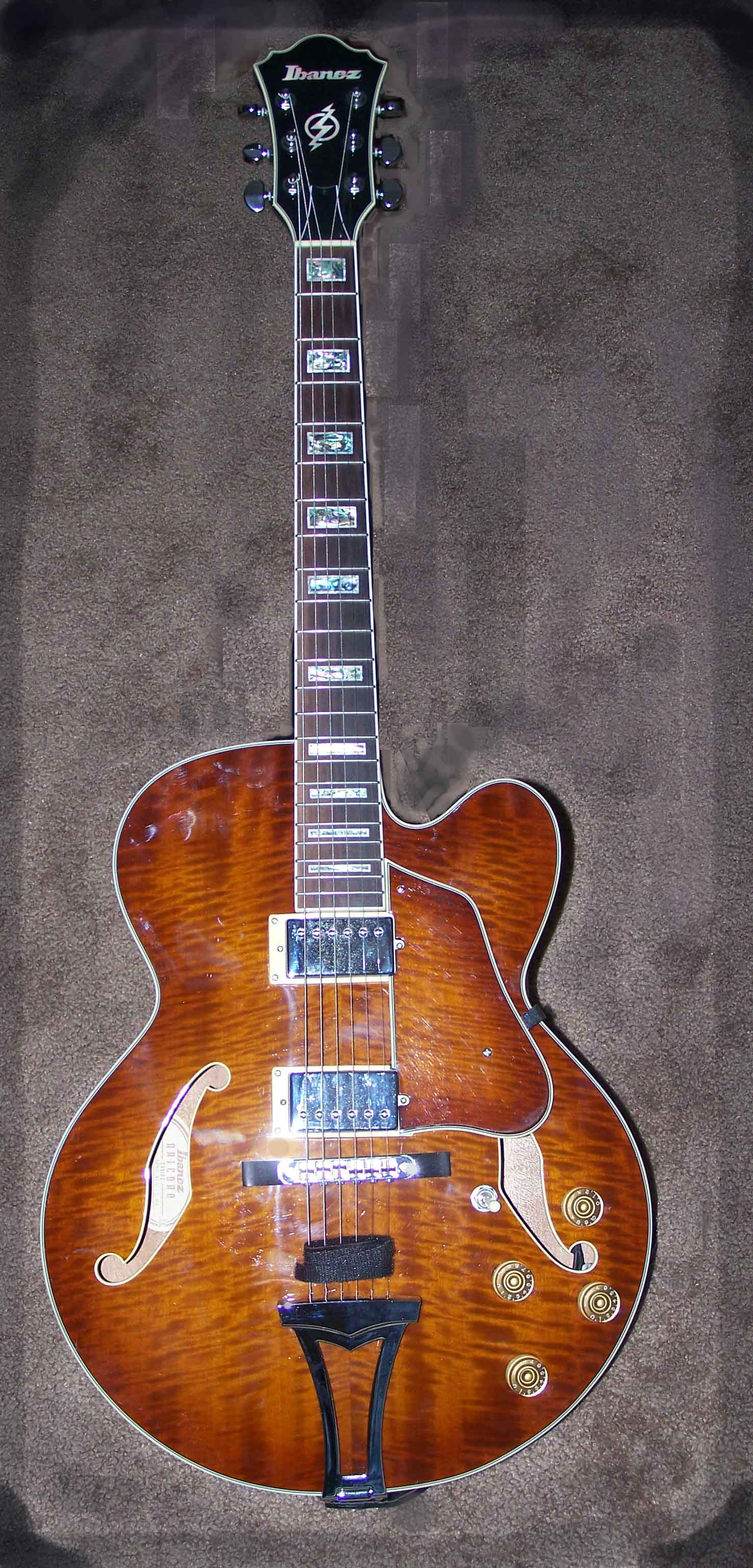
- Ibanez Artcore AF85
- Manufacturer: Ibanez
- Period: 2002-present

Construction
- Body type: Hollow
- Neck joint: Set-in Neck
- Scale: 24.75"

Woods
- Body: Flamed Maple top/back/sides
- Neck: 3pc Mahogany/ Maple
- Fretboard: Bound Rosewood

Hardware
- Bridge: ART1 bridge
- Pickup: H-H/ACH1(neck)and ACH2(bridge)

The Ibanez Artcore series is Ibanez's line of semi and full hollowbody electric guitars.

== Background and press ==
The first Ibanez Artcore models were released in mid-2002 by Ibanez, whose goal was to offer an affordable range of full-hollow and semi-hollow body guitars that appealed to entry level guitarists who were unable or unwilling to pay big money on high-priced guitars. The Artcore series has developed a reputation for being one of the best value guitars on the market and has been praised by reviewers, being highly respected for their tone, sustain and the way they hold their tuning.

After 2017, many models no longer used rosewood and bubinga, and some models that sported maple and mahogany have substituted in linden and nyatoh woods.

== Models ==
- AF55
- AF55L
- AF71F
- AF75
- AF75G
- AF75L
- AF75T
- AF75TDG
- AFS75T
- AG75
- AG75G
- AGS73FM
- AKJV95
- AM53
- AM73B
- AS53
- AS53L
- AS73
- AS73G
- AS73L
- AS73T
- AS7312

=== Discontinued ===
- AF75D
- AF75FM
- AF85
- AF86
- AFS75T
- AFS75TD
- AFS77T
- AFS78T
- AFS80T
- AFS95T
- AG95
- AGR63T
- AGS73FM
- AGS83B
- AJD91
- AJD71T
- AK80BS
- AK85
- AK85DVS1201
- AK86
- AKJ95
- AM73
- AM77
- AM78T
- AS83
- AS93
- AS103
- ASR70
- AWD82LTD
- AWD83
- AWD83T
- AXD82P
- AXD83P
- AXD81

== See also ==
- Ibanez
- Semi-acoustic guitar
- Ibanez AF195 AV

== References/external links ==
- Ibanez's Official
- Musicians Friend Review of AFS-75T
- Guitar World's Review of AFS-77TMG and AXD-81VLS – Review also features opinions on the whole Artcore series
