= Ibanez AF195 AV =

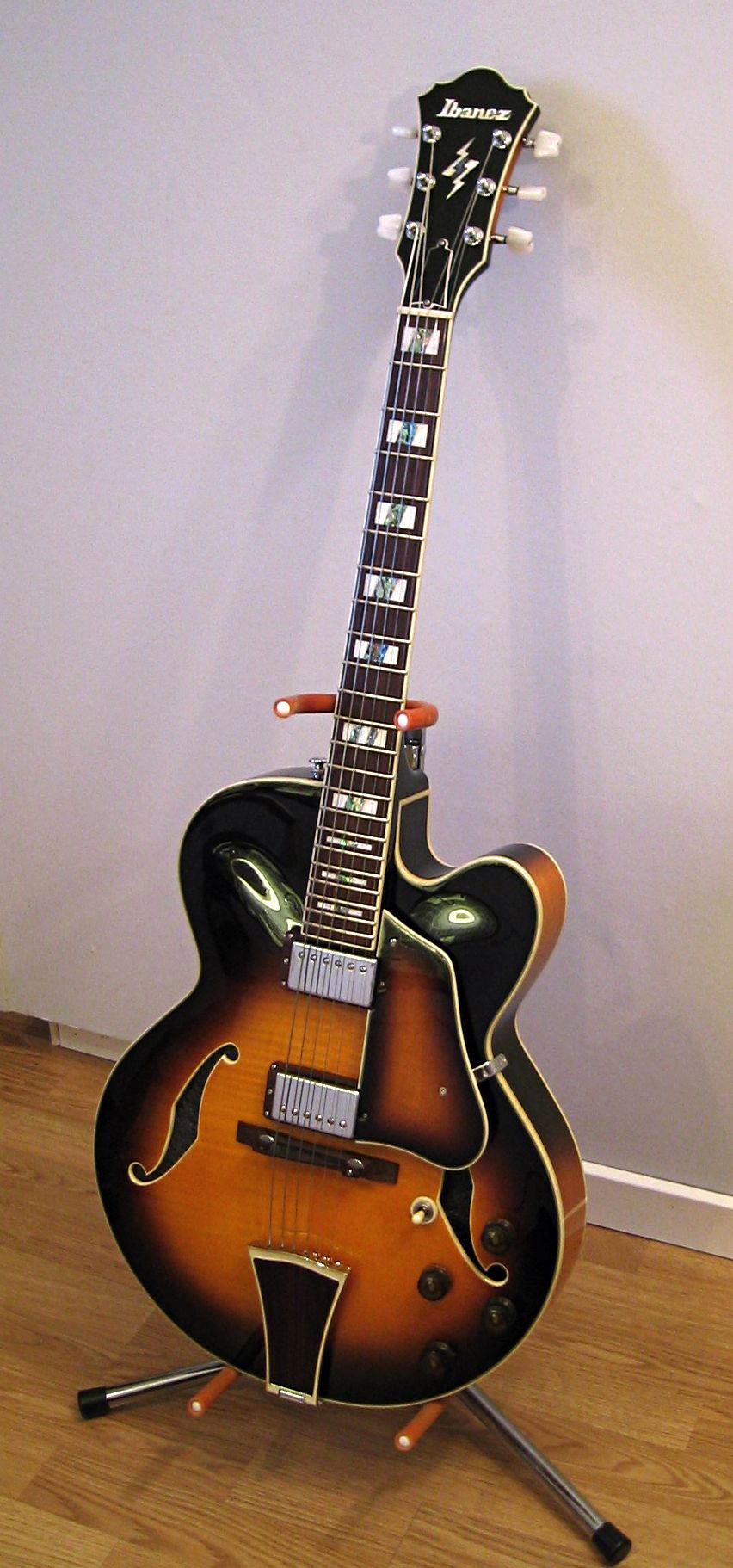
- Manufacturer: Ibanez Guitars
- Period: 2004

Construction
- Body type: Hollow
- Neck joint: Set

Woods
- Body: Laminated flamed maple top, maple sides and back
- Neck: 3 piece mahogany/maple/mahogany
- Fretboard: Rosewood with abalone and mother-of-pearl block inlays, 22 semi-jumbo frets

Hardware
- Bridge: Floating compensated rosewood bridge, height adjustable
- Pickup(s): 2 Ibanez humbucker pickups: Super 58 Neck and Super 58 Bridge (Japanese made)

Colors available
- Antique Violin

Ibanez Artcore United AF195 AV is a hollow body electric guitar manufactured by Ibanez that was introduced as part of their Artcore United series in 2004. The Artcore United models were positioned by Ibanez in between the Japanese built Prestige models (George Benson GB10 etc.) and the Chinese made Artcore series. To achieve the higher quality while keeping the price in control a rather complex production chain was set up:

The unfinished bodies were same as used in the Artcore series, produced in an Ibanez Chinese factory.

At the Japanese Ibanez Fujigen factory the Artcore United guitars were assembled. The Japanese produced 3 piece necks and hardware were fitted and the guitars were finished.

In the USA Ibanez facilities in Bensalem, Pennsylvania and Idaho Falls, Idaho, the AF 195 series were inspected and set-up by Ibanez USA quality control. It only states "Made in Japan" on the Artcore United guitars.

The list price was USD1329.99 (the optional case AF200C was listed at USD169.99).

== Specification ==
- Body: Laminated flamed maple top, maple sides and back, single venetian cutaway
- Fingerboard: Bound rosewood, with abalone and mother-of-pearl block inlays "Artist block", 22 semi-jumbo frets,
- Neck: three piece Artcore United (Japan) set in, mahogany/maple/mahogany (similar to Prestige necks)
- Neck Scale: 24 3/4"
- Bridge: Floating compensated rosewood bridge, height adjustable
- Color: Antique Violin
- Gotoh tuners (Japan)
- Tailpiece: VT100 in rosewood and bronze
- Neck Pickup: Super 58 Humbucker (Japan)
- Bridge Pickup: Super 58 Humbucker (Japan)
- Pickup frames: Massive rosewood
- Controls: Two volume, two Tone, with SureGrip knobs
- Strap buttons: Rear button on the tail piece mountain plate. Front button included in the package but not mounted at factory.
- Hardware Color: Chrome

== Artists ==
Ibanez used Eric Krasno (Soullive) in the marketing of the Artcore United series.

== From the Ibanez 2004 catalogue ==
At the apex of Ibanez full and semi-acoustic guitars are the Prestige Benson, Metheny and Scofield models. At the base are the fantastically popular Artcores. In the center are the new Ibanez Artcore United guitars. Artcore United full and semi acoustic guitars feature resonant Artcore bodies enhanced by flawless Japanese craftsmanship, finishing and the crowning touch of Japanese Ibanez necks with their famous playability. With Prestige artist models, the affordable Artcore and now the new Artcore United, Ibanez truly has Boxes For All

== Picture gallery ==
High resolution pictures.

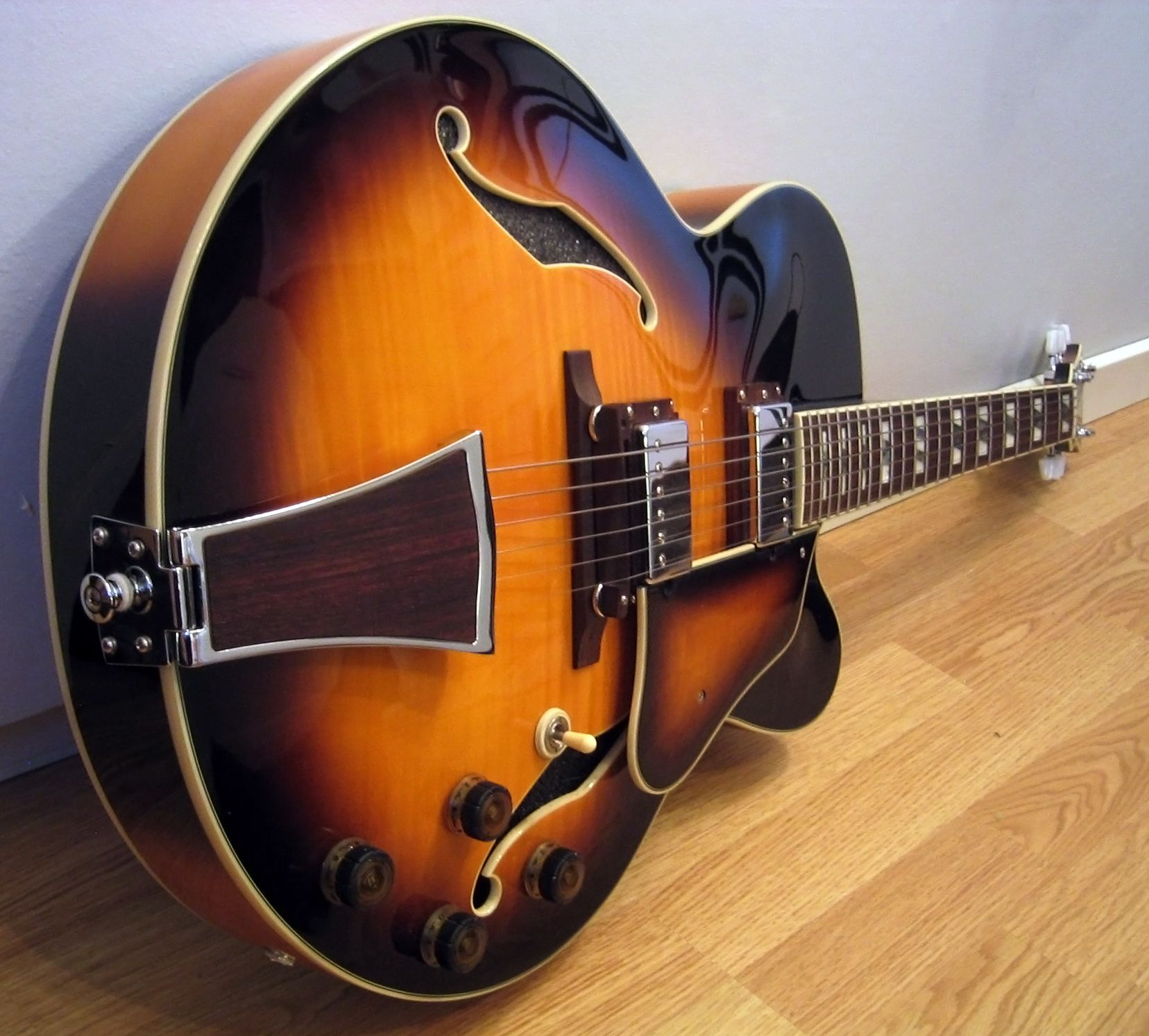

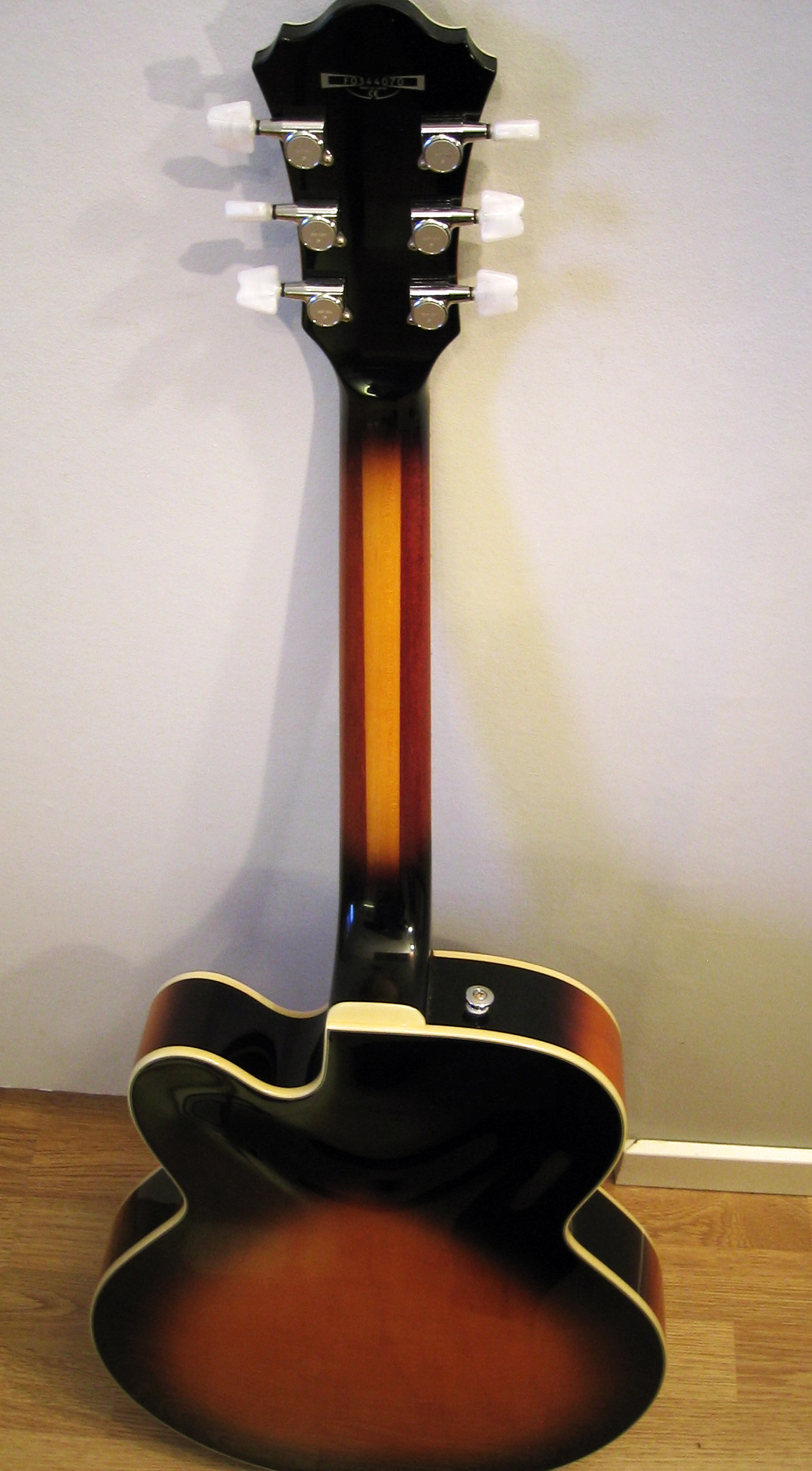

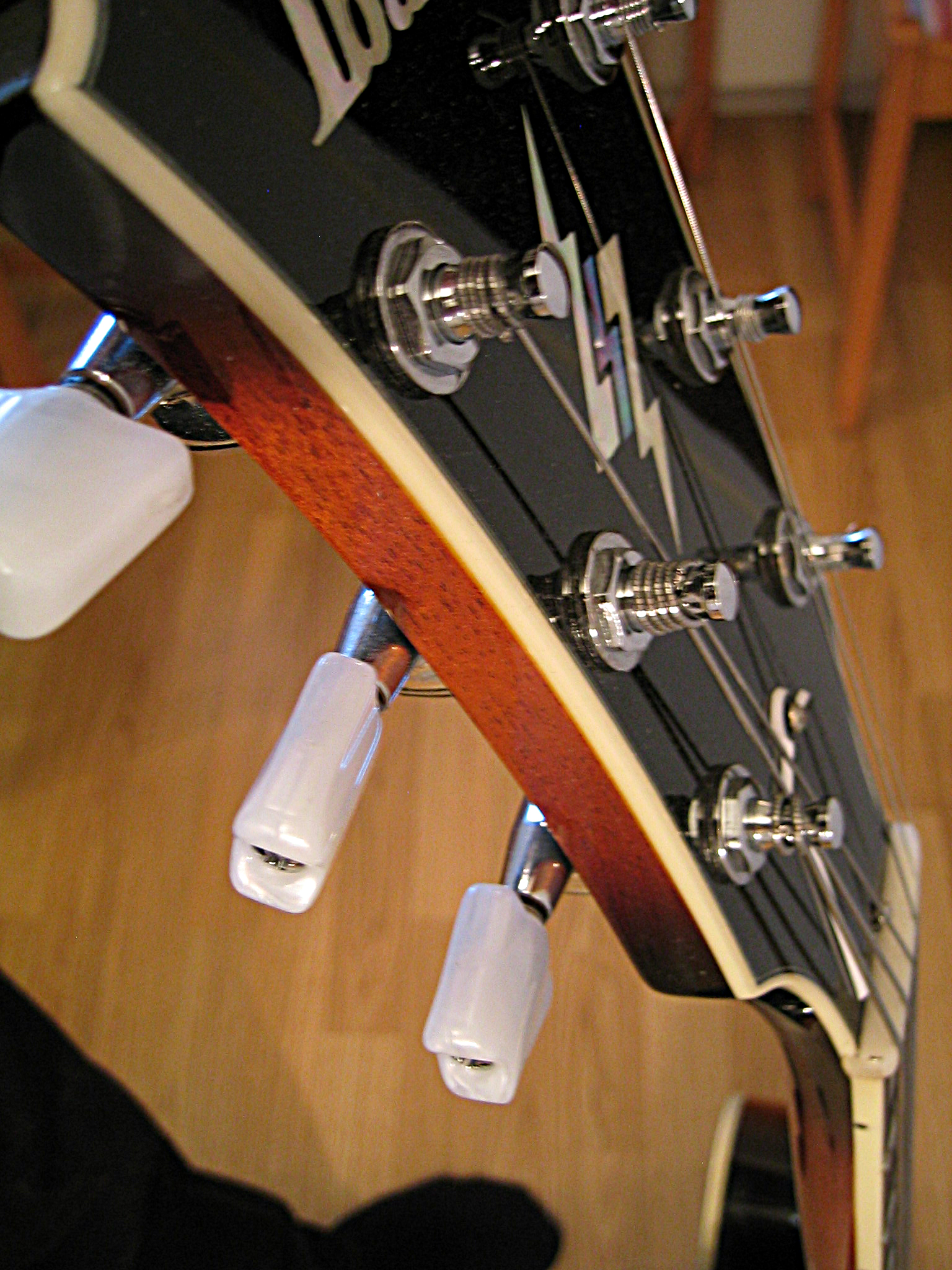

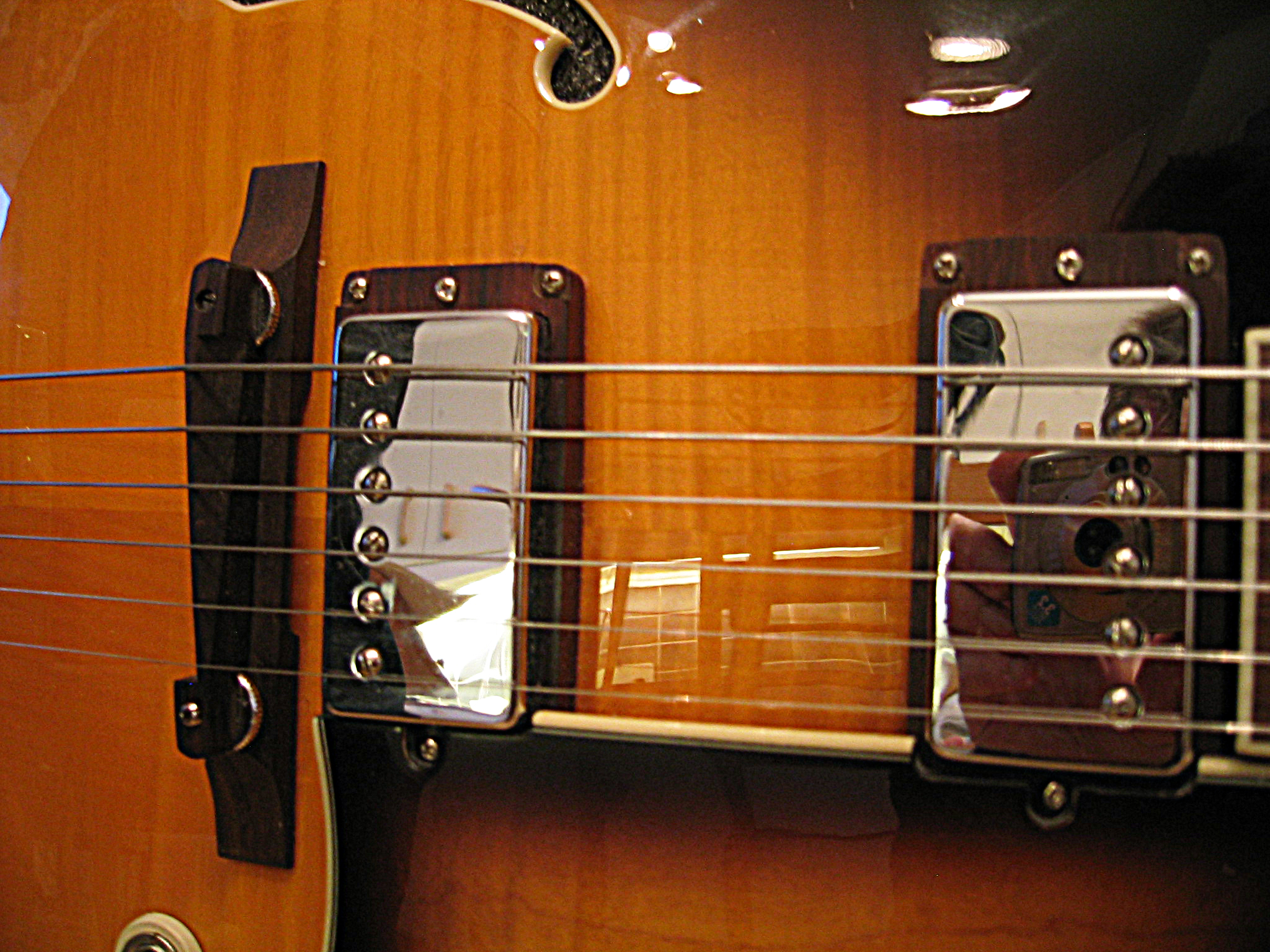

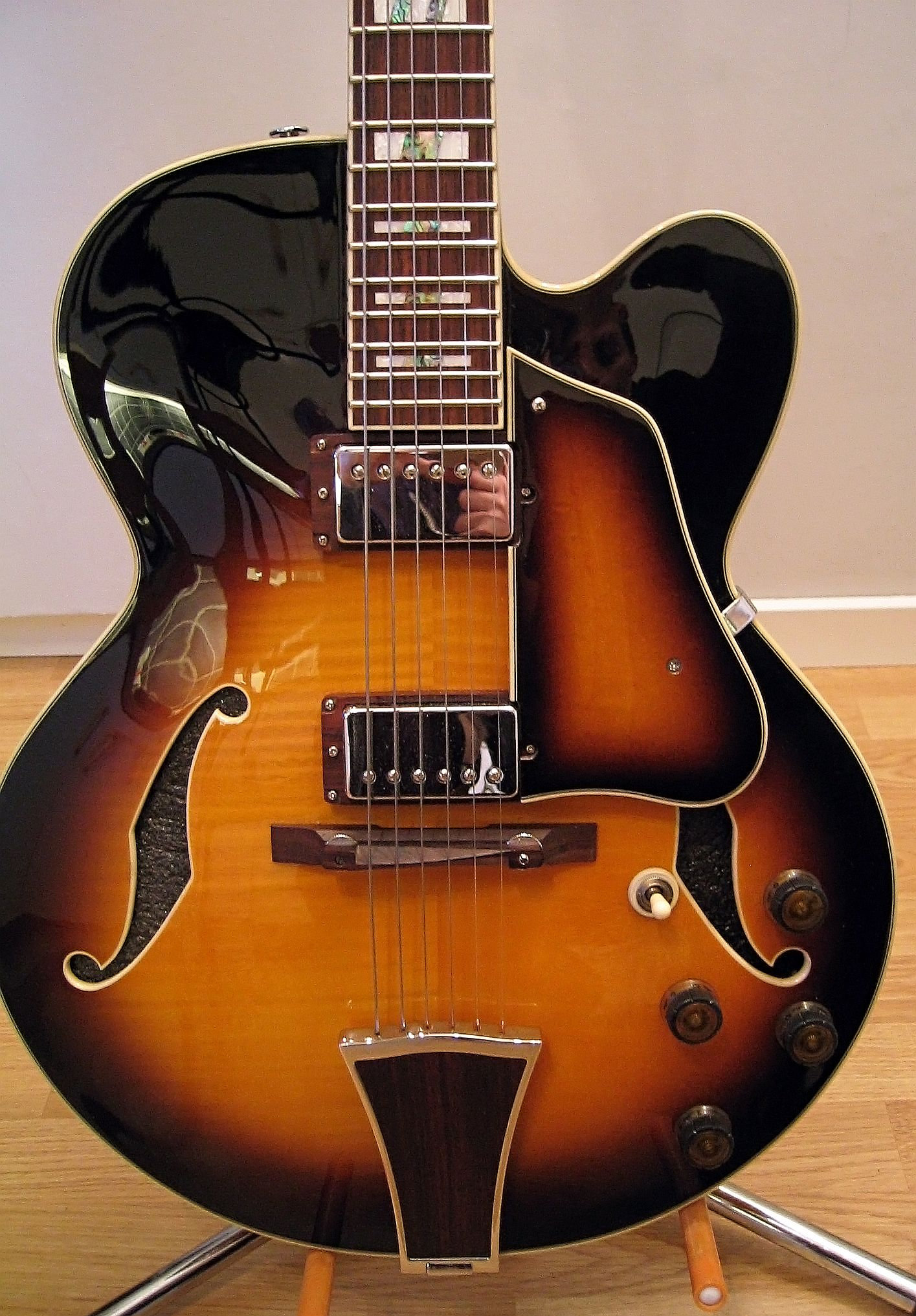

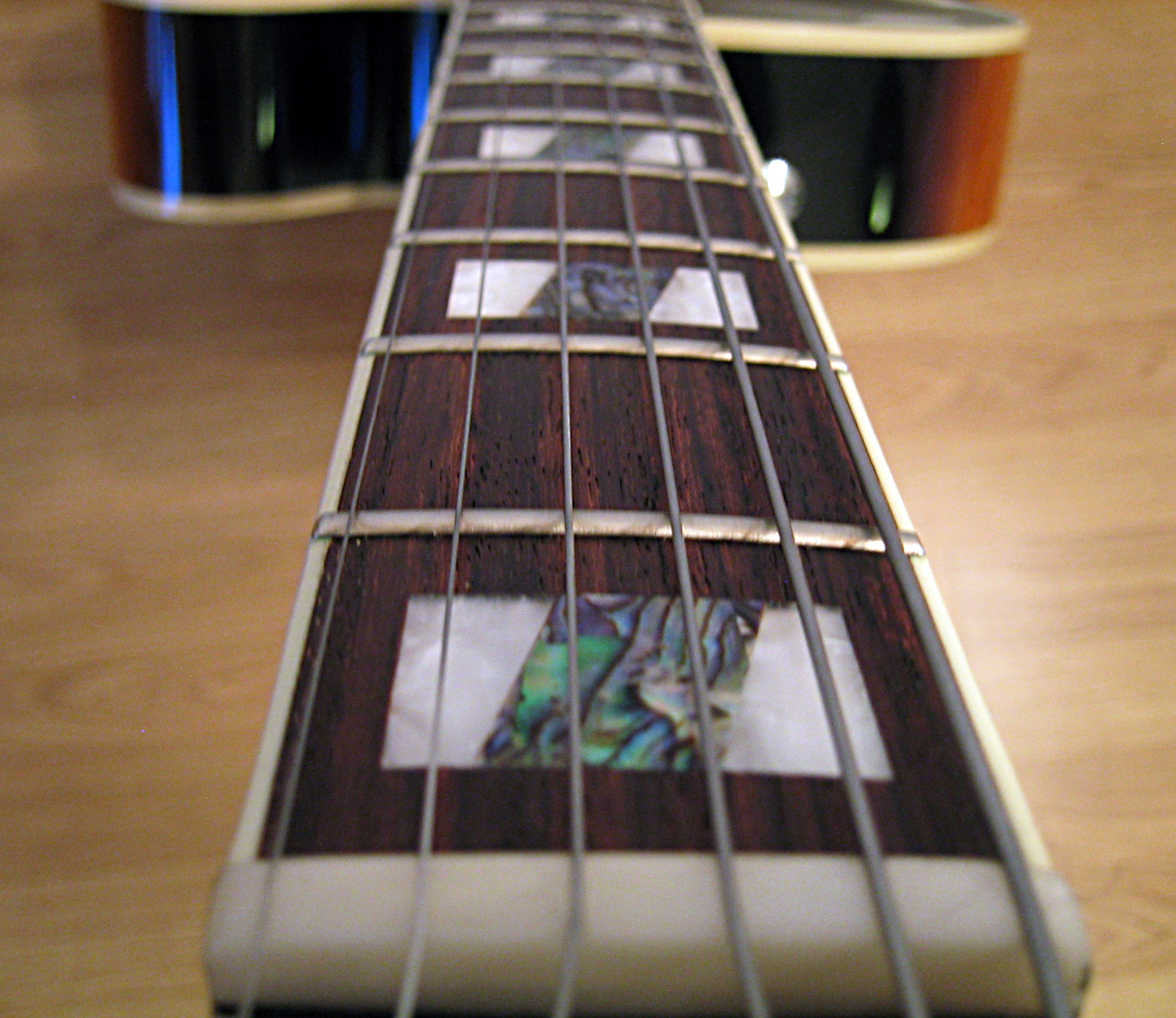
